= Ambos Camarines's 1st congressional district =

Legislative district of the Philippines

Ambos Camarines's 1st congressional district was a congressional district that encompassed the northern and western portions of the former province of Ambos Camarines. It was represented in the Philippine Assembly from 1907 to 1916 and in the House of Representatives of the Philippine Islands from 1916 to 1919. The Spanish colonial province of Ambos Camarines was reorganized under the Insular Government of the Philippine Islands on April 27, 1901 and was divided into three districts. Tomás Arejola, who was a former member of the Malolos Congress for Ambos Camarines's at-large district in 1898, was elected as this district's first representative in 1907. Following its repartition into Camarines Norte and Camarines Sur on March 3, 1919, the district was abolished with its northern territory having been absorbed by Camarines Norte's at-large congressional district.

== Representation history ==
#	Image	Member	Term of office		Legislature	Party	Electoral history	Constituent LGUs
#	Image	Member	Start	End	Legislature	Party	Electoral history	Constituent LGUs
=== Ambos Camarines's 1st district for the Philippine Assembly ===
District created January 9, 1907.
1		Tomás Arejola	October 16, 1907	October 16, 1912	1st	Nacionalista	Elected in 1907.	1907–1909; Capalonga, Daet, Gainza, Indan, Labo, Libmanan, Lupi, Mambulao, Milaor, Minalabac, Pamplona, Paracale, Pasacao, Ragay, San Fernando, Sipocot
1		Tomás Arejola	October 16, 1907	October 16, 1912	2nd	Nacionalista	Re-elected in 1909.	1909–1916; Basud, Cabusao, Capalonga, Daet, Gainza, Indan, Labo, Libmanan, Lupi, Mambulao, Milaor, Minalabac, Pamplona, Paracale, Pasacao, Ragay, San Fernando, Sipocot, Talisay
2		Silverio D. Cecilio	October 16, 1912	October 16, 1916	3rd	Nacionalista	Elected in 1912.	1909–1916; Basud, Cabusao, Capalonga, Daet, Gainza, Indan, Labo, Libmanan, Lupi, Mambulao, Milaor, Minalabac, Pamplona, Paracale, Pasacao, Ragay, San Fernando, Sipocot, Talisay
=== Ambos Camarines's 1st district for the House of Representatives of the Philippine Islands ===
3		Gonzalo S. Escalante	October 16, 1916	June 3, 1919	4th	Nacionalista	Elected in 1916.	1916–1919; Basud, Cabusao, Capalonga, Daet, Gainza, Indan, Labo, Libmanan, Lupi, Mambulao, Milaor, Minalabac, Pamplona, Paracale, Pasacao, Ragay, San Fernando, Sipocot, Talisay
District dissolved into Camarines Norte's at-large and Camarines Sur's 1st districts.

== See also ==
- Legislative districts of Camarines Norte
- Legislative districts of Camarines Sur
