= Camarines Sur Provincial Board =

Legislative body of the province of Camarines Sur, Philippines

Camarines Sur Provincial Board Sangguniang Panlalawigan ng Camarines Sur

Type
- Type: Unicameral
- Term limits: 3 terms (9 years)

Leadership
- Presiding Officer: Salvio Patrick Fortuno, NUP since June 30, 2022

Structure
- Seats: 13 board members 1 ex officio presiding officer
- Political groups: NUP (8) NPC (2) TBD (2) Nonpartisan (2)
- Length of term: 3 years
- Authority: Local Government Code of the Philippines

Elections
- Voting system: Plurality-at-large (regular members); Indirect election (ex officio members)
- Last election: May 12, 2025
- Next election: May 15, 2028

Meeting place
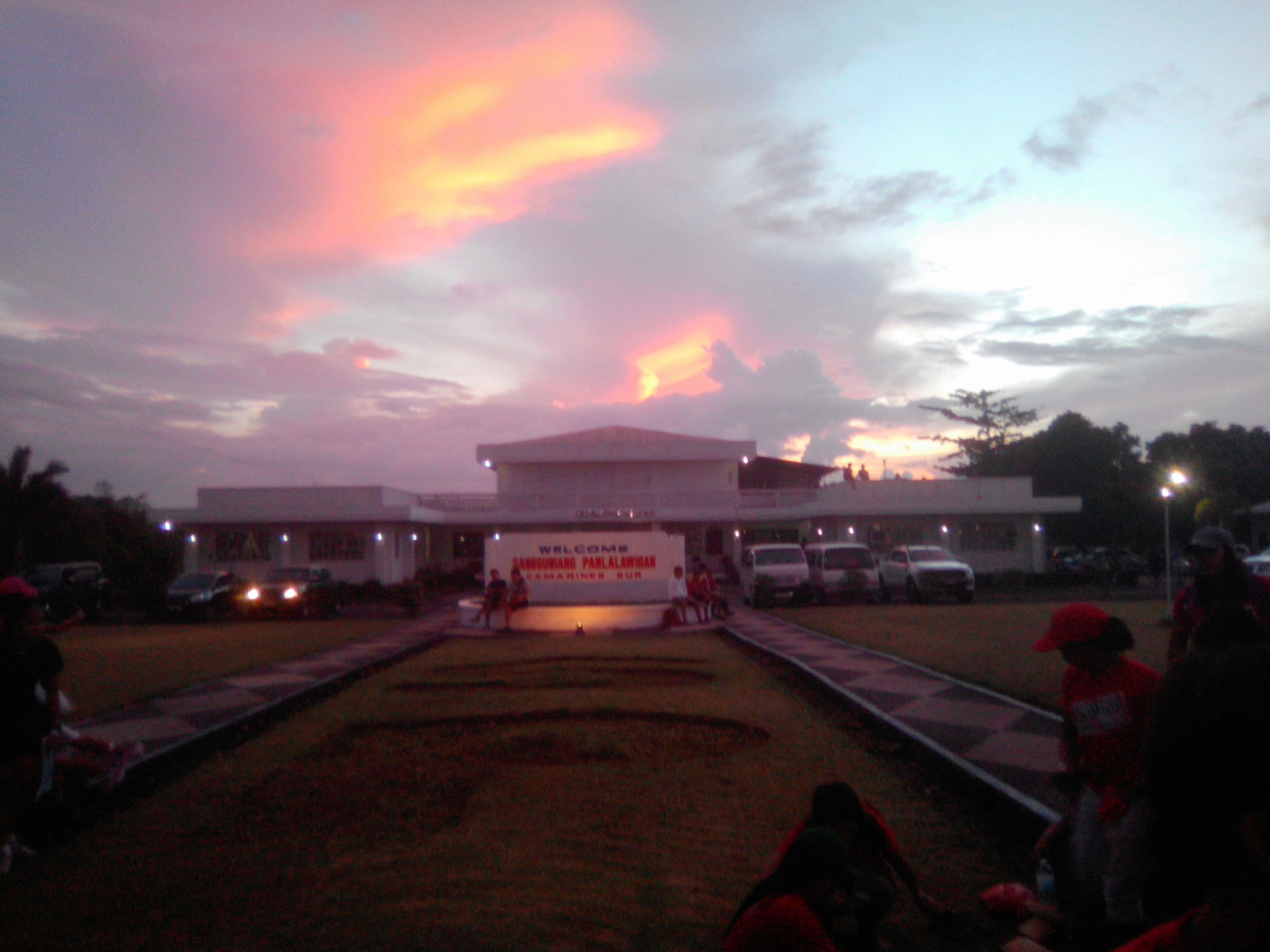
- Legislative Building, Pili

The Camarines Sur Provincial Board is the Sangguniang Panlalawigan (provincial legislature) of the Philippine province of Camarines Sur.

The members are elected via plurality-at-large voting: the province is divided into five districts, the first district sending one member, the second, third and fourth district sending two members each, and the fifth district sending three members to the provincial board; the number of candidates the electorate votes for and the number of winning candidates depends on the number of members their district sends. The vice governor is the ex officio presiding officer, and only votes to break ties. The vice governor is elected via the plurality voting system province-wide.

The districts used in appropriation of members is coextensive with the legislative districts of Camarines Sur, with the exception that Naga, an independent component city, is excluded in the third district.

Aside from the regular members, the board also includes the provincial federation presidents of the Liga ng mga Barangay (ABC, from its old name "Association of Barangay Captains"), the Sangguniang Kabataan (SK, youth councils) and the Philippine Councilors League (PCL).

== Apportionment ==
Elections	Seats per district					Ex officio seats	Total seats
Elections	1st	2nd	3rd	4th	5th	Ex officio seats	Total seats
2001–2007	2	2	2	3	—	3	13
2010–2022	1	2	2	2	3	3	13

== List of members ==
=== Current members ===
These are the members after the 2025 local elections and 2023 barangay and SK elections:

- Vice Governor: Salvio Patrick Fortuno Jr. (NUP)

Seat	Board member	Party	Start of term	End of term
1st district	Warren A. Señar	NUP	June 30, 2019	June 30, 2028
2nd district	Sofia Charis N. Hernandez	NUP	June 30, 2025	June 30, 2028
2nd district	Darius S. Nopra	NUP	June 30, 2025	June 30, 2028
3rd district	Vanessa DR. Señar	NUP	June 30, 2022	June 30, 2028
3rd district	John Apollo S. Manaog	NUP	June 30, 2022	June 30, 2028
4th district	Gerard F. Pilapil	NPC	June 30, 2025	June 30, 2028
4th district	Emmanuel F. Llaguno	NPC	June 30, 2019	June 30, 2028
5th district	Donna Ann R. Oñate	NUP	June 30, 2022	June 30, 2028
5th district	Jesha Aina F. Noble	NUP	June 30, 2022	June 30, 2028
5th district	Regin Oliver N. Oliva	NUP	June 30, 2025	June 30, 2028
ABC	Christopher Jacinto	Nonpartisan	January 12, 2024	January 1, 2026
PCL				June 30, 2028
SK	Justmine San Buenaventura	Nonpartisan	November 29, 2023	January 1, 2026

=== Vice Governor ===
Election year	Name	Party
2004	Salvio Fortuno	
2007	Salvio Fortuno	
2010	Fortunato Peña (Note: Tendered his resignation in January 2019, effective February 28, 2019.)	Nacionalista
2013	Fortunato Peña	Nacionalista
2016	Fortunato Peña	Liberal
2016	Romulo Hernandez (Note: Board member elevated to Vice Governor.)	Nacionalista
2019	Imelda Papin	PDP–Laban
2022	Salvio Patrick F. Fortuno Jr	PDP–Laban
2025	Salvio Patrick F. Fortuno Jr	NUP

=== 1st District ===
- Municipalities: Cabusao, Del Gallego, Lupi, Ragay, Sipocot
- Population (2020): 207,496

Election year	Member (party)	Member (party)
2007	Romulo Hernandez	Darius Nopra (Nacionalista)
2010	Warren Señar (Nacionalista)	—
2013	Warren Señar (Independent)	—
2016	Russel Bañes (NPC)	—
2019	Trixie Ann Clemente-Maquiling (NPC)	—
2022	Warren Señar (PDP-Laban)	—
2025	Warren A. Señar (NUP)	—

=== 2nd District ===
- Municipalities: Gainza, Libmanan, Milaor, Minalabac, Pamplona, Pasacao, San Fernando
- Population (2020): 343,942

Election year	Member (party)	Member (party)
2007	Charina Pante	Angel Naval
2010	Romulo Hernandez (Nacionalista)	Darius Nopra (Nacionalista)
2013	Romulo Hernandez (Note: Served in a de facto capacity because of issues surrounding his Certificate of Candidacy (COC) which was canceled by the COMELEC on January 30, 2015 due to questions about term limits. He had already served on the provincial board for three consecutive terms, albeit in different districts.) (Nacionalista)	Darius Nopra (Nacionalista)
2013	Gabriel Ariel Abonal (Note: Proclaimed by the Special Provincial Board of Canvassers of the Second District of Camarines Sur to be the duly-elected member of the provincial board on February 20, 2015.) (NPC)	Darius Nopra (Nacionalista)
2016	Romulo Hernandez (Note: Elevated to Vice Governor on March 1, 2019.) (Nacionalista)	Alexander James Jaucian (Liberal)
2016	Vacant	Alexander James Jaucian (Liberal)
2019	Romulo Hernandez (Bicol1)	Alexander James Jaucian (Nacionalista)
2022	Romulo Hernandez (PDP-Laban)	Niño Tayco (PDP-Laban)
2025	Sofia Charis N. Hernandez (NUP)	Darius S. Nopra (NUP)

=== 3rd District ===
- Municipalities: Bombon, Calabanga, Camaligan, Canaman, Magarao, Ocampo, Pili
- Population (2020): 345,153

Election year	Member (party)	Member (party)
2007	Emmanuel Llaguno	Marcel Pan
2010	Charina Pante (NPC)	Angel Naval (Nacionalista)
2013	Nelson Julia (NPC)	Angel Naval (Note: Served in a de facto capacity because of issues surrounding his Certificate of Candidacy (COC) which was canceled by the COMELEC before the 2013 elections due to questions about term limits. He had already served on the provincial board for three consecutive terms, albeit in different districts. 'Resigned' on February 27, 2015.) (Nacionalista)
2013	Nelson Julia (NPC)	Manuel Andal (Note: Proclaimed by the Special Provincial Board of Canvassers of the Third District of Camarines Sur to be the duly-elected member of the provincial board on March 12, 2015.) (NPC)
2016	Nelson Julia (Nacionalista)	Salvador Señar Jr. (NPC)
2019	Nelson Julia (Nacionalista)	Angel Naval (Nacionalista)
2022	Vanessa DR. Señar (NUP)	Apollo Manaog (PDP-Laban)
2025	Vanessa DR. Señar (NUP)	John Apollo S. Manaog (NUP)

=== 4th District ===
- Municipalities: Caramoan, Garchitorena, Goa, Lagonoy, Presentacion, Sagñay, San Jose, Siruma, Tigaon, Tinambac
- Population (2020): 420,838

Election year	Member (party)	Member (party)	Member (party)
2007	Ruperto Alfelor	Rodito Espiritu Jr.	Wilfredo Rex Oliva
2010	Emmanuel Llaguno (NPC)	Rosito Velarde (NPC)	—
2013	Amador Simando (Liberal)	Gilmar Pacamarra (NPC)	—
2016	Amador Simando (Liberal)	Gilmar Pacamarra (Nacionalista)	—
2019	Gerard Pilapil (NPC)	Emmanuel F. Llaguno (NPC)	—
2022	Eugene Fuentebella (NPC)	Emmanuel F. Llaguno (NPC)	—
2025	Gerard F. Pilapil (NPC)	Emmanuel F. Llaguno (NPC)	—

=== 5th District ===
- City: Iriga
- Municipalities: Baao, Balatan, Bato, Buhi, Bula, Nabua
- Population (2020): 499,713

Election year	Member (party)	Member (party)	Member (party)
2010	Ruperto Alfelor (Lakas)	Wilfredo Rex Oliva (Nacionalista)	Rodito Espiritu Jr. (Nacionalista)
2013	Fabio Figuracion (Nacionalista)	Emmanuel Noble (Nacionalista)	Rodito Espiritu Jr. (Nacionalista)
2016	Fabio Figuracion (Nacionalista)	Emmanuel Noble (Nacionalista)	Wilfredo Rex Oliva (Nacionalista)
2019	Ruperto Alfelor (NPC)	Emmanuel Noble (Nacionalista)	Wilfredo Julio Oliva (Nacionalista)
2022	Donna Ann Oñate (PDP-Laban)	Jesha Aina Noble (PDP-Laban)	Wilfredo Julio Oliva (PDP-Laban)
2025	Donna Ann R. Oñate (NUP)	Jesha Aina F. Noble (NUP)	Regin Oliver N. Oliva (NUP)
