= Camarines Sur's 1st congressional district =

Legislative district of the Philippines

- Constituency for the House of Representatives of the Philippines
- Boundary of congressional district in city/province

- Location of Camarines Sur within the Philippines
- Province: Camarines Sur
- Region: Bicol Region
- Population: 207,496 (2020)
- Electorate: 136,519 (2022)
- Major settlements: 5 LGUs: Municipalities; Cabusao; Del Gallego; Lupi; Ragay; Sipocot
- Area: 1,097.88 km^{2} (423.89 sq mi)

Current constituency
- Created: 1919
- Representative: Tsuyoshi Anthony G. Horibata
- Political party: NUP
- Congressional bloc: Majority

Camarines Sur's 1st congressional district is one of the five congressional districts of the Philippines in the province of Camarines Sur. It has been represented in the House of Representatives of the Philippines since 1919. The district consists of the northern Camarines Sur municipalities of Cabusao, Del Gallego, Lupi, Ragay and Sipocot. It is represented in the 20th Congress by Tsuyoshi Anthony Horibata of the National Unity Party (NUP).

== Representation history ==
#	Image	Member	Term of office		Legislature	Party	Electoral history	Constituent LGUs
#	Image	Member	Start	End	Legislature	Party	Electoral history	Constituent LGUs
=== Camarines Sur's 1st district for the House of Representatives of the Philippine Islands ===
District created March 3, 1919. Redistricted from Ambos Camarines's 2nd district.
1		Silverio D. Cecilio	June 3, 1919	June 6, 1922	5th	Nacionalista	Elected in 1919.	1919–1935; Cabusao, Calabanga, Camaligan, Gainza, Libmanan, Lupi, Magarao, Milaor, Minalabac, Naga, Pamplona, Pasacao, Ragay, San Fernando, Sipocot
2		Ramón B. Felipe	June 6, 1922	June 5, 1928	6th	Nacionalista; Colectivista	Elected in 1922.	1919–1935; Cabusao, Calabanga, Camaligan, Gainza, Libmanan, Lupi, Magarao, Milaor, Minalabac, Naga, Pamplona, Pasacao, Ragay, San Fernando, Sipocot
2		Ramón B. Felipe	June 6, 1922	June 5, 1928	7th	Demócrata	Re-elected in 1925.	1919–1935; Cabusao, Calabanga, Camaligan, Gainza, Libmanan, Lupi, Magarao, Milaor, Minalabac, Naga, Pamplona, Pasacao, Ragay, San Fernando, Sipocot
3		Mariano E. Villafuerte	June 5, 1928	June 5, 1934	8th	Demócrata	Elected in 1928.	1919–1935; Cabusao, Calabanga, Camaligan, Gainza, Libmanan, Lupi, Magarao, Milaor, Minalabac, Naga, Pamplona, Pasacao, Ragay, San Fernando, Sipocot
3		Mariano E. Villafuerte	June 5, 1928	June 5, 1934	9th	Nacionalista; Consolidado	Re-elected in 1931.	1919–1935; Cabusao, Calabanga, Camaligan, Gainza, Libmanan, Lupi, Magarao, Milaor, Minalabac, Naga, Pamplona, Pasacao, Ragay, San Fernando, Sipocot
4		Ignacio Melitón	June 5, 1934	September 16, 1935	10th	Nacionalista; Democrático	Elected in 1934.	1919–1935; Cabusao, Calabanga, Camaligan, Gainza, Libmanan, Lupi, Magarao, Milaor, Minalabac, Naga, Pamplona, Pasacao, Ragay, San Fernando, Sipocot
#	Image	Member	Term of office		National Assembly	Party	Electoral history	Constituent LGUs
#	Image	Member	Start	End	National Assembly	Party	Electoral history	Constituent LGUs
=== Camarines Sur's 1st district for the National Assembly (Commonwealth of the Philippines) ===
5		Francisco Celebrado	September 16, 1935	December 30, 1941	1st	Nacionalista; Democrático	Elected in 1935.	1935–1938; Cabusao, Calabanga, Camaligan, Gainza, Libmanan, Lupi, Magarao, Milaor, Minalabac, Naga, Pamplona, Pasacao, Ragay, San Fernando, Sipocot
5		Francisco Celebrado	September 16, 1935	December 30, 1941	2nd	Nacionalista	Re-elected in 1938.	1938–1941; Cabusao, Calabanga, Camaligan, Del Gallego Gainza, Libmanan, Lupi, Magarao, Milaor, Minalabac, Naga, Pamplona, Pasacao, Ragay, San Fernando, Sipocot
District dissolved into the two-seat Camarines Sur's at-large district for the National Assembly (Second Philippine Republic).
#	Image	Member	Term of office		Common wealth Congress	Party	Electoral history	Constituent LGUs
#	Image	Member	Start	End	Common wealth Congress	Party	Electoral history	Constituent LGUs
=== Camarines Sur's 1st district for the House of Representatives of the Commonwealth of the Philippines ===
District re-created May 24, 1945.
6		Jaime M. Reyes	June 11, 1945	May 25, 1946	1st	Nacionalista	Elected in 1941.	1945–1946; Cabusao, Calabanga, Camaligan, Del Gallego Gainza, Libmanan, Lupi, Magarao, Milaor, Minalabac, Naga, Pamplona, Pasacao, Ragay, San Fernando, Sipocot
#	Image	Member	Term of office		Congress	Party	Electoral history	Constituent LGUs
#	Image	Member	Start	End	Congress	Party	Electoral history	Constituent LGUs
=== Camarines Sur's 1st district for the House of Representatives of the Philippines ===
7		Juan Q. Miranda	May 25, 1946	December 30, 1949	1st	Liberal	Elected in 1946.	1946–1949; Cabusao, Calabanga, Camaligan, Del Gallego Gainza, Libmanan, Lupi, Magarao, Milaor, Minalabac, Naga, Pamplona, Pasacao, Ragay, San Fernando, Sipocot
8		Emilio M. Tible	December 30, 1949	December 30, 1957	2nd	Nacionalista	Elected in 1949.	1949–1972; Bombon, Cabusao, Calabanga, Camaligan, Del Gallego Gainza, Libmanan, Lupi, Magarao, Milaor, Minalabac, Naga, Pamplona, Pasacao, Ragay, San Fernando, Sipocot
8		Emilio M. Tible	December 30, 1949	December 30, 1957	3rd	Nacionalista	Re-elected in 1953.	1949–1972; Bombon, Cabusao, Calabanga, Camaligan, Del Gallego Gainza, Libmanan, Lupi, Magarao, Milaor, Minalabac, Naga, Pamplona, Pasacao, Ragay, San Fernando, Sipocot
9		Agatón A. Ursúa	December 30, 1957	December 30, 1961	4th	Nacionalista	Elected in 1957.	1949–1972; Bombon, Cabusao, Calabanga, Camaligan, Del Gallego Gainza, Libmanan, Lupi, Magarao, Milaor, Minalabac, Naga, Pamplona, Pasacao, Ragay, San Fernando, Sipocot
10		Juan F. Triviño	December 30, 1961	December 30, 1965	5th	Nacionalista	Elected in 1961.	1949–1972; Bombon, Cabusao, Calabanga, Camaligan, Del Gallego Gainza, Libmanan, Lupi, Magarao, Milaor, Minalabac, Naga, Pamplona, Pasacao, Ragay, San Fernando, Sipocot
11		Ramon Felipe Jr.	December 30, 1965	September 23, 1972	6th	Liberal	Elected in 1965.	1949–1972; Bombon, Cabusao, Calabanga, Camaligan, Del Gallego Gainza, Libmanan, Lupi, Magarao, Milaor, Minalabac, Naga, Pamplona, Pasacao, Ragay, San Fernando, Sipocot
11		Ramon Felipe Jr.	December 30, 1965	September 23, 1972	7th	Liberal	Re-elected in 1969. Removed from office after imposition of martial law.	1949–1972; Bombon, Cabusao, Calabanga, Camaligan, Del Gallego Gainza, Libmanan, Lupi, Magarao, Milaor, Minalabac, Naga, Pamplona, Pasacao, Ragay, San Fernando, Sipocot
District dissolved into the twelve-seat Region V's at-large district for the Interim Batasang Pambansa, followed by the four-seat Camarines Sur's at-large district for the Regular Batasang Pambansa.
District re-created February 2, 1987.
12		Rolando R. Andaya	June 30, 1987	June 30, 1998	8th	UNIDO	Elected in 1987.	1987–2010; Cabusao, Del Gallego, Libmanan, Lupi, Minalabac, Pamplona, Pasacao, Ragay, San Fernando, Sipocot
12		Rolando R. Andaya	June 30, 1987	June 30, 1998	9th	Lakas	Re-elected in 1992.	1987–2010; Cabusao, Del Gallego, Libmanan, Lupi, Minalabac, Pamplona, Pasacao, Ragay, San Fernando, Sipocot
12		Rolando R. Andaya	June 30, 1987	June 30, 1998	10th	Lakas	Re-elected in 1995.	1987–2010; Cabusao, Del Gallego, Libmanan, Lupi, Minalabac, Pamplona, Pasacao, Ragay, San Fernando, Sipocot
13		Rolando Andaya Jr.	June 30, 1998	February 5, 2006	11th	Lakas	Elected in 1998.	1987–2010; Cabusao, Del Gallego, Libmanan, Lupi, Minalabac, Pamplona, Pasacao, Ragay, San Fernando, Sipocot
13		Rolando Andaya Jr.	June 30, 1998	February 5, 2006	12th	Liberal	Re-elected in 2001.	1987–2010; Cabusao, Del Gallego, Libmanan, Lupi, Minalabac, Pamplona, Pasacao, Ragay, San Fernando, Sipocot
13		Rolando Andaya Jr.	June 30, 1998	February 5, 2006	13th	Liberal	Re-elected in 2004. Resigned on appointment as Secretary of Budget and Management.	1987–2010; Cabusao, Del Gallego, Libmanan, Lupi, Minalabac, Pamplona, Pasacao, Ragay, San Fernando, Sipocot
-	vacant		February 5, 2006	June 30, 2007	13th	No special election to fill vacancy.		1987–2010; Cabusao, Del Gallego, Libmanan, Lupi, Minalabac, Pamplona, Pasacao, Ragay, San Fernando, Sipocot
14		Diosdado Macapagal Arroyo	June 30, 2007	June 30, 2010	14th	KAMPI	Elected in 2007. Redistricted to the 2nd district.	1987–2010; Cabusao, Del Gallego, Libmanan, Lupi, Minalabac, Pamplona, Pasacao, Ragay, San Fernando, Sipocot
14		Diosdado Macapagal Arroyo	June 30, 2007	June 30, 2010	14th	Lakas	Elected in 2007. Redistricted to the 2nd district.	1987–2010; Cabusao, Del Gallego, Libmanan, Lupi, Minalabac, Pamplona, Pasacao, Ragay, San Fernando, Sipocot
(13)		Rolando Andaya Jr.	June 30, 2010	June 30, 2019	15th	Lakas	Elected in 2010.	2010–present Cabusao, Del Gallego, Lupi, Ragay, Sipocot
(13)		Rolando Andaya Jr.	June 30, 2010	June 30, 2019	16th	Lakas	Re-elected in 2013.	2010–present Cabusao, Del Gallego, Lupi, Ragay, Sipocot
(13)		Rolando Andaya Jr.	June 30, 2010	June 30, 2019	17th	NPC	Re-elected in 2016.	2010–present Cabusao, Del Gallego, Lupi, Ragay, Sipocot
15		Marissa Lourdes M. Andaya	June 30, 2019	July 5, 2020	18th	NPC	Elected in 2019. Died in office.	2010–present Cabusao, Del Gallego, Lupi, Ragay, Sipocot
16		Tsuyoshi Anthony G. Horibata	June 30, 2022	Present	19th	NUP	Elected in 2022.	2010–present Cabusao, Del Gallego, Lupi, Ragay, Sipocot
16		Tsuyoshi Anthony G. Horibata	June 30, 2022	Present	20th	NUP	Re-elected in 2025.	2010–present Cabusao, Del Gallego, Lupi, Ragay, Sipocot

== Election results ==
=== 2025 ===
Candidate	Party	Votes	%
Hori Horibata (incumbent)	National Unity Party	66,522	57.32
Thaddy Ramos	Nationalist People's Coalition	49,532	42.68
Total		116,054	100.00
Valid votes		116,054	95.70
Invalid/blank votes		5,211	4.30
Total votes		121,265	100.00
Registered voters/turnout		142,177	85.29
National Unity Party hold			
Source: Commission on Elections

=== 2022 ===
2022 Philippine House of Representatives elections
Party	Candidate	Votes	%
PDP–Laban	Hori Horibata	58,098	52.98
NPC	Maribel Andaya	51,555	47.02
Total votes		109,653	100.00
PDP–Laban gain from NPC			

=== 2019 ===
2019 Philippine House of Representatives elections
Party	Candidate	Votes	%
NPC	Marissa Andaya	61,480	
Nacionalista	Long "Kuya Paco" Mejia	29,228	
Total votes		90,708	100.00
NPC hold			

=== 2016 ===
2016 Philippine House of Representatives elections
Party	Candidate	Votes	%
NPC	Rolando Andaya, Jr.	55,526	
Liberal	Apolinar Rull Napoles	22,185	
Nacionalista	Nestor de los Reyes	830	
Invalid or blank votes		10,978	
Total votes		89,519	
NPC hold			

=== 2013 ===
2013 Philippine House of Representatives elections
Party	Candidate	Votes	%
Lakas	Rolando Andaya, Jr.	53,986	73.89
Nacionalista	Nestor de los Reyes	5,681	7.78
Margin of victory		48,305	66.12%
Invalid or blank votes		13,391	18.33
Total votes		73,058	100.00
Lakas hold			

=== 2010 ===
2010 Philippine House of Representatives elections
Party	Candidate	Votes	%
Lakas–Kampi	Rolando Andaya, Jr.	59,175	79.31
Nacionalista	Nestor delos Reyes	10,186	13.65
Valid ballots		69,361	92.96
Invalid or blank votes		5,256	7.04
Total votes		74,617	100.00
Lakas–Kampi hold			

== See also ==
- Legislative districts of Camarines Sur
