= Juan Miranda =

Juan Miranda may refer to:

== Arts ==
- Juan Carreño de Miranda (1614–1685), Spanish baroque painter
- Juan García de Miranda (1677–1749), Spanish baroque painter

== Politicians ==
- Juan Durán de Miranda, Governor of New Mexico (1664–1665, 1671–1675)
- Juan Q. Miranda (1912–1985), Filipino politician

== Sports ==
- Juan Miranda (runner) (1928–?), Argentine middle-distance runner
- Juan Miranda (swimmer) (born 1968), Salvadoran swimmer and Salvadorian Olympian
- Juan Miranda (baseball) (born 1983), Cuban baseball player
- Juan Miranda (footballer) (born 2000), Spanish footballer
- Juan Fernández Miranda (born 1974), Argentine rugby player
- Juan Paredes (boxer), a.k.a. Juan Paredes Miranda, (born 1953), Mexican Olympic boxer

== Fictional characters ==
- Juan Miranda, main character in 1971 film Duck, You Sucker!
