= Juan Q. Miranda =

Bicolano congressman and war leader (1912–1985)

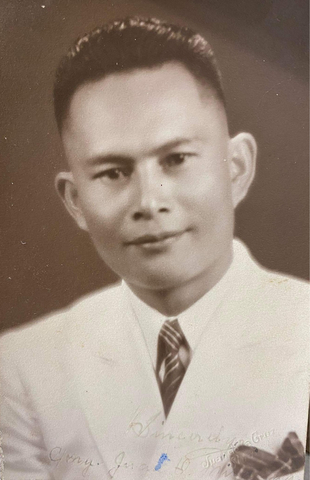

Member of the Philippine House of Representatives from Camarines Sur's 1st district
- In office May 25, 1946 – December 30, 1949
- Preceded by: Jaime M. Reyes
- Succeeded by: Emilio M. Tible

Personal details
- Born: Juan Querubin Miranda; March 8, 1912 San Nicolas, Canaman, Camarines Sur, Philippine Islands
- Died: June 1, 1985 (aged 73) Canaman, Camarines Sur, Philippines
- Party: Liberal
- Spouse(s): Eustaquia Miranda Conchita Estrada (m. 1946–1985)

Military service
- Allegiance: Philippines
- Branch/service: Philippine Commonwealth Army
- Years of service: 1936-1945
- Rank: Colonel
- Unit: Tangcong Vaca Guerrilla Unit
- Battles/wars: Battle of Taguilid Pass; Battle of Naga

Juan Querubin Miranda (March 8, 1912 – June 1, 1985) was a Filipino politician, non-commissioned officer, and war leader who was the first Representative of the 1st Congressional District of Camarines Sur, (1946–1949) in the 1st Congress of the Philippines. Before the onset of World War II, he was a finance sergeant with the Philippine Army assigned at the Regan Barracks, Legazpi City. He also headed the Tangcong Vaca Guerrilla Unit organized by him, Elias Madrid and Leon S.A. Aureus.

== Personal life ==
Miranda married his first wife, Eustaquia Miranda, when he was a finance sergeant in the Philippine Army stationed at Regan Barracks in Legazpi City. He had five children, Cesar, Domingo, Antonio, Norma and Thelma Miranda. He then married his second wife, a Spanish mestiza, Conchita Estrada after World War II, having one son with her, Juan Arthur Miranda Jr.

== War record ==
Miranda, together with Elias Madrid and Leon S.A. Aureus, established the Tangcong Vaca Guerrilla Unit on March 8, 1942 the first anti-Japanese resistance group in Camarines Sur which resolutely waged a guerrilla warfare from 1942 to 1945. The group, in concert with other guerrilla forces, was able to liberate Naga twice and successfully saved many lives of American and Filipino soldiers incarcerated by the Japanese during the war.

=== Origins of the Tangcong Vaca Guerrilla Unit (TVGU) ===
Originally an ex-finance sergeant at the Regan Barracks in Legazpi, he was recommended by who would soon be the Finance Officer of the movement, Elias Madrid, a staunchly anti-Japanese affluent uncle of his, to a local journalist---Leon Aureus, for the role of Commanding Officer due to his military experience as a non-commissioned officer (NCO).

==== Sipocot train arson incident ====
On February 24, 1942, Juan Miranda met with Simeon Ayala and Leon Aureus somewhere in Naga under the formal guise of a "rakkan joint venture with business associates" to finalize their orchestration of the arson. Their main objective was to ultimately deprive the Japanese temporary railroad access from Manila to the Bicol Region in Sipocot to confine and jeopardize their supply lines to the roads.

On the morning of February 27, 1942, Juan Miranda, Simeon Ayala, and Leon Aureus set fire to the remaining train of the Bicol Express fleet at the MRR-owned Sipocot Station. They poured a gallon-full can of gasoline, smuggled prior from Aureus' workplace at the Moll mines, in a train car then summarily ignited it. This caused an uncontrollable gasoline-fed flame, killing their targets which were the two Japanese soldiers delivering rice rations and one civilian subject to collateral damage. This was one of the first large-scale accounts of anti-Japanese defiance in Camarines Sur.

==== Formation of the Anti-Sabotage Unit ====
On March 8, 1942, a week after the incident, Miranda held a secret meeting on his 30th birthday at his residence in San Nicolas, Canaman with Leon Aureus and brothers Elias and Policarpio Madrid to formally commence forth the formation of the Anti-Sabotage Unit, short for Anti-Sabotage Unit of the Philippine Army.

On this meeting, Miranda was unanimously tasked with recruiting affiliated personnel of the Philippine Army, Philippine Scouts, and Philippine Constabulary. He also promised the faction the formal recognition and approval of the United States Army Air Forces (USAFFE) unit originally stationed at Regan Barracks in Legazpi and eventually most of the pertinent high command structure during the war.

Despite the implementation of the name 'Anti-Sabotage Unit,' the term Miranda's Guerrillas were colloquially utilized among other names by the underground resistance in Bicol. Some time in May 1942, the Anti-Sabotage Unit was officially renamed to the recognizable, Tangcong Vaca Guerrilla Unit (TVGU).

==== Feats of the TVGU led by Miranda ====
As included above, one of the first acts of anti-Japanese defiance in Camarines Sur is often cited to be their Sipocot train arson incident. Listed below are direct confrontations and engagements initiated by the Tangcong Vaca Guerrilla Unit against the Imperial Japanese Army in 1942, excluding the Liberation of Naga (1942):

- On April 11, 1942, the barge at the Balongay Wharf in Calabanga requisitioned by the Imperial Japanese Army Railways and Shipping Section were destroyed by a platoon of Tangcong Vaca Guerrilla Unit soldiers.
- On March 13, a group of demolitioneers led by Jaime Senardes blew up the concrete bridge in Labao, Libmanan to cut the overland transportation link between Libmanan and Naga.
- On March 21, a unit led by Miranda engaged with a couple of Japanese soldiers at Tiniguiban.
  - On April 27, the Tangcong Vaca Guerrilla Unit was dispatched to Libmanan to demolish the National Rice and Corn Corporation (NARIC) bodega in Libmanan owned by a staunch proprietor, Doña Flaviana Ocampo. The Japanese Association of Camarines Sur was using the property in milling thousands of cavans (98.28 litres per cavan in metric) daily, replenishing the rations of Imperial Japanese Army garrisons in Naga and elsewhere in Central Camarines Sur. The captured surplus of cavans were handed out throughout the black market in Naga. Meanwhile, the TVGU stockpiled a quarter in undisclosed deposits and warehouses in nearby Pamplona, Canaman, Gainza and Libmanan for future rationing. Ocampo was interned after the demolishment, with the officers warning her that she will be accordingly dealt with lest she continues her collaboration with the Japanese Army.
- On October 9, 70 Japanese soldiers were killed at Nagboton, Malinao, Libmanan.
- On May 2, 1943, 63 Japanese soldiers and 35 personnel belonging to the Philippine Constabulary sympathizing with the Japanese were killed at Nayog, Gabi, Sipocot.

=== Liberation of Naga (1942) ===
==== Background ====
A day after their engagement at Tiniguiban, on 22 March 1942, Miranda and the other officers discussed about the audacious task of liberating Naga. This, however, was passed around as an irreversible risk if lost so they summarily dismissed such proposition.

On April 30, the Camp Isarog Guerrillas (CIG), another Bicolano resistance group in Camarines Sur, had liberated the Town of Iriga within a day. The CIG were resolved bound for north via Highway 1 to the Capital of Naga. On the same day in the evening, the Tangcong Vaca Guerrilla Unit (TVGU) officers Miranda, Aureus, and Madrid attending a marriage in San Nicolas, Canaman, oblivious to the recent developments, were only notified by a CIG Canaman-bound messenger, Ceferino Francisco. Once acquainted with the prime objectives, Miranda and the chain of command mustered as many men as they could within the duration of nightfall.

==== Three-day liberation ====
On May 1, 1942 in the afternoon, the TVGU deployed from the southeast of Naga in Milaor. Fighting had already ensued earlier in the morning between the sole CIGs and the Japanese, preluded by the detonation of a coconut bomb. As Miranda's men proceeded towards Tabuco, they encountered mild resistance met with machine gun fire. However, they retorted with gunfire of their own and managed to clear the Naga Public Market and its surrounding premises. The rest of the day was mopping up isolated Japanese units detached from the Capitol garrison. Miranda and his men at this point were providing needed suppression upon the parapets and pill-boxed emplacements at the Naga Provincial Capitol.

Between the first and the second day of the liberation, the density of combat gravitated between the Provincial Jail and Provincial Capitol. By 4:00 a.m on the second day, the Naga Provincial Capitol and its American internees were freed by the Camp Isarog Guerrillas. They were transferred to and from Naga, until the entirety of the caravan found temporary refuge in Tigaon, the CIGs base of operations. In the south of Naga, the Tangcong Vaca Guerrillas witnessed mass torching campaigns at night that lit endless smoldering fires around the Provincial Capitol.

The rest of the day was described to be a long struggle to gain ground near the Capitol. However, on the early morning of May 3, 12 Japanese and Filipino collaborators managed to escape on a sequestered semi-armored truck from the besieged Capitol while the firefights died down at midnight. A Criscini and Villafuerte were among the collaborators, with the two being found dead with their Japanese overlords at Sabang, Calabanga before boarding a bangka to Daet. Civically renowned lawyers throughout the municipalities of Camarines Sur had sided with the Japanese, with most trialed under a military court. They were convicted of treason and summarily executed by beheading in Tigaon.

=== Period after the liberation ===
On the early morning of May 3, Naga was liberated from the Imperial Japanese Army's 16th Division's series of garrisons. A haphazard victory parade, joined by civilians, wound the downtown area of Centro Naga. The joint tenacity bore by the Tangcong Vaca Guerrilla Unit, Camp Isarog Guerrilla, and the other guerrilla units involved secured the fate of 30 few Americans from Naga Provincial Jail and the countless other citizens caught in the fray.

This however, was short-lived, as news of an 8,000-strong force of IJA soldiers fresh from Manila sent by Governor-General Masaharu Homma himself arrived to Naga. The TVGU and the other guerrilla units involved conceded to the new garrison sent, and retreated back to the mountain municipalities.

After a firm manhunt throughout Camarines Norte, on July 1942, Governor Wenceslao Vinzons of the Vinzons Travelling Guerrillas (VTG) was captured by the Japanese authorities and was promptly executed. His partner, a Filipino-Syrian USAFFE non-commissioned officer named Francisco Boayes, alias Turko, went into hiding with Juan Q. Miranda in the Tangcong Vaca Guerrilla Unit in the opening days of August.

=== Battle of Taguilid Pass ===
On November 28, 1942, Capt. Juan Q. Miranda commanded a squad to ambush a 200-man Japanese convoy escorting high profile officials sent to inspect the Ateneo de Naga garrison that disembarked at Pasacao Harbor from Manila at Taguilid Pass, Pamplona.

Moderate sources claim more than all of the 200 Japanese soldiers were eliminated, garnished with the guerrilla reports having killed 2 lieutenants, 2 captains, and 2 lieutenant colonels. One of these lieutenant colonels was Ichisaburu Takichi, the commanding officer of those stationed in the Ateneo de Naga garrison. Reportedly, the Tangcong Vaca guerrillas sustained none.

Anecdotal fallacies of this relatively unknown battle have surfaced throughout the years, with local writers revising the main objective of Battle of Taguilid Pass to be "the mission to eliminate the convoy of General Takano."

=== Miranda's conflict with other guerrilla units ===
In 1943, Miranda, accompanied by Turko, dispatched himself as an envoy to other guerrilla units, headed to Mt. Isarog and Albay to establish a channel with Capt. Padua, one of the former Camp Isarog Guerrilla's commanders who went into hiding ever since Flor's surrender to the Japanese after the Liberation of Naga.

Upon Miranda and Turko's arrival to Mt. Isarog, they were met with Capt. Buenaflor's men who had a woman force shaved in their custody named Na Tancing. The men claimed the detainee was among the agents the Japanese had recruited in their "pacification" campaign in Partido, supposedly having reported guerrilla sympathizers to the Japanese authorities. This fact however did not deter Miranda and Turko from being smitten by her.

This encounter fueled a rivalry between the leaders and caused a schism in the unified underground resistance of the parties. According to a memoir by Angeles Javier Aureus, Leon Aureus' wife, in the Bicol Mail:

The two guerrilla leaders - Turko and Miranda - fell in love with the woman and wanted her. The rivalry between Miranda and Turko took over the woman led to fighting between the two camps, resulting in the death of one of our rifle men. In the end Miranda won the woman and Turko separated from our group. By the time Miranda brought the woman to our camp, she was already pregnant.

— A.J Aureus, Bicol Mail, 2004

=== Battle of Naga (1945) ===
==== Background ====
At 19:00 on April 5, 1945, Maj. Russell Barros of the Allied Intelligence Bureau (AIB), assigned to assist the unification of all the guerilla forces in the Bicol Region, congregated with different guerilla units at Pamukid Central School in San Fernando to discuss the status quo. The attendees were high-ranking officials of the Tangcong Vaca Guerilla Unit, the now defunct Camp Isarog Unit, and the many resistance outfits holed in the Isarog forestry. Besides Miranda, the other present officers were Majors Jesus Villasenor, Teodoro Serenilla, Teofilo Padua, Captains Encinas, Francisco Enrile and Lt. Delfin Rosales.

They were the composition of a vanguard of high profile military leaders leading one big conglomerate force from all the different outfits spread about in Camarines Sur. In the former half of the conference, Barros entailed a brief status report of the United States Armed Forces’ island-hopping campaign and the contemporary plans for the Philippine liberation the previous month of March, highlighting the local guerilla forces’ roles as being the preliminary ‘softeners’ of the Japanese garrisons and military facilities teeming in Camarines Sur.

Naga was designated as a prime subject affixed to the ‘liberation’ agenda. To lead the assault force, most unanimously elected famed Commanding Officer of the Tangcong Vaca Guerilla Unit, Major Juan Q. Miranda, proposing to assemble the outfit at the Camaligan Central School on the 8th of April, three days from then, to preparedly poise the men of the assault for the coming days.

After the meeting, Monsignor. Florencio Yllana, affiliated closely with the guerillas as their spiritual advisor, hosted the conferences’ concluding party. At the party, both Maj./s Barros and Miranda reproached the same regrettable reluctance of Cpt. Cristobal Bonnevie’s 2nd Battalion, likely for both the evident ineptitude and lack of discipline instilled by the commanding officers of the unit. They frowned upon the possibility of discourse instigated by the imprudence of the 2nd Battalion; so, Miranda concluded their furtive exchange with a plan to definitively keep the 2nd Battalion away from combat.

==== Dismissal of the 2nd Battalion ====
At the schoolyard of Camaligan Central School on April 8, 1945, assemblies of different guerilla contingents were gathered. The lines were queued towards the faculty offices where Maj. Barros and Dr. Francisco Gomez were stationed. The queue was ordered to undress their clothing until underwear, then they had to surrender their firearms in the office of Maj. Russel Barros to fill an information sheet, and then they had to proceed to Dr. Francisco Gomez for a brief medical check-up. After conforming to procedure, the constituent guerrillas regrouped with their outfits. First in line were the companies of TVGU, with Miranda deliberately delegating 2nd Battalion to the very end.

When it was the 2nd Battalion’s turn for checkup, the column was spontaneously escorted by accomplices elsewhere into a different room. Lt. Felix “Barloo” Espiritu and Capt. Encinas with his Philippine Scouts sealed off all the possible exits, with Lt. Honorato Osio’s men, who were stationed at the Home Economics building disguised as mess officers, making for Maj. Barros’ office and confiscating the 2nd Battalion’s arsenal. Ensuring that the 2nd Battalion were not to retaliate, Maj. Miranda addressed their disarmament and dismissal of the unit as the 2nd Battalion from the operation.

In total, the seven company columns were headed by the Capt. Mamerto Sibulo, Lt. Honorato Osio, Lt. Nicolas Penaredondo, all of the Tancong Vaca Guerilla Unit (TVGU); The Blue Eagle under Lt. Felicisimo De Asis; the Philippine Army Air Corps under Lt. Delfin Rosales; the Blue Eagle under Capt. Serenilla and the now dismissed 2nd Battalion under Capt. Cristobal Bonnevie.

==== Last preparations ====
Later in the evening, Maj. Miranda was invited to the house of Mayor Andres Diez of Camaligan for ‘merindal.’ Maj. Miranda then met with Maj. Barros, Maj. Villasenor, Andres Diez and Lt. Rhys Wood, a young officer from the Allied Intelligence Bureau (AIB).

Later that evening, Miranda and Lt. Wood rallied back at the Camaligan Central School to finalize the execution of the assault with the others. Their plan was to infiltrate the Ateneo and the Capitol garrisons by dawn, then liberating the Abella at the Panganiban Bridge and the Manley residence at the Colgante Bridge from Kempeitai control.

At 4a.m. on April 9, 1945, breakfast rations were distributed evenly among the companies. With their stomachs full, the regiment deployed into the town of Camaligan towards the capital of Naga.

==== Ateneo garrison ====
At 5am., the guerillas plodded through the lush forestries of the Queborac and accordingly positioned themselves overlooking the rear of the Ateneo De Naga campus. Short arms fire then combed the rear walls of the main building, covering the men entering through the back gate.

They then proceeded into the main building and cleared the premises through room-to-room procedure. After clearing some rooms, the men slowly came to realize that the entirety of the campus had been aborted by the Japanese prior, sleuthing out the disassembled 50-caliber machine gun in one of the rooms and a shanty armory bestrewn with trace ammunition rounds left by the Japanese.

The men were then ordered to utilize the conducive machine gun and its 50-caliber munitions lest an engagement might thicken. For 30 minutes, the men rummaged through the abandoned Japanese combat equipment strewn about in the rooms. Content with what was acquired, they proceeded to their next objective, the malice-stricken Provincial Capitol.

== Political career ==
Upon the conclusion of World War II, Miranda, along with Tobal Buenavie and Leon Aureus, attended the Liberal Party Convention in Manila as delegates privileged with free transportation. Afterwards, Miranda won the Liberal Party candidacy for Representative of the 1st District of Camarines Sur.

Miranda was appointed by Manuel Roxas as the Representative of the 1st District of Camarines Sur in the post-war 1st Congress of the Commonwealth of the Philippines. His most significant legislative undertaking was in sponsoring a bill creating the City of Naga as a chartered city independent of the province of Camarines Sur, which was duly approved on December 15, 1948 by virtue of Republic Act No. 305.
