= Ragay =

Municipality in Camarines Sur, Philippines

- Municipality
- Municipality of Ragay
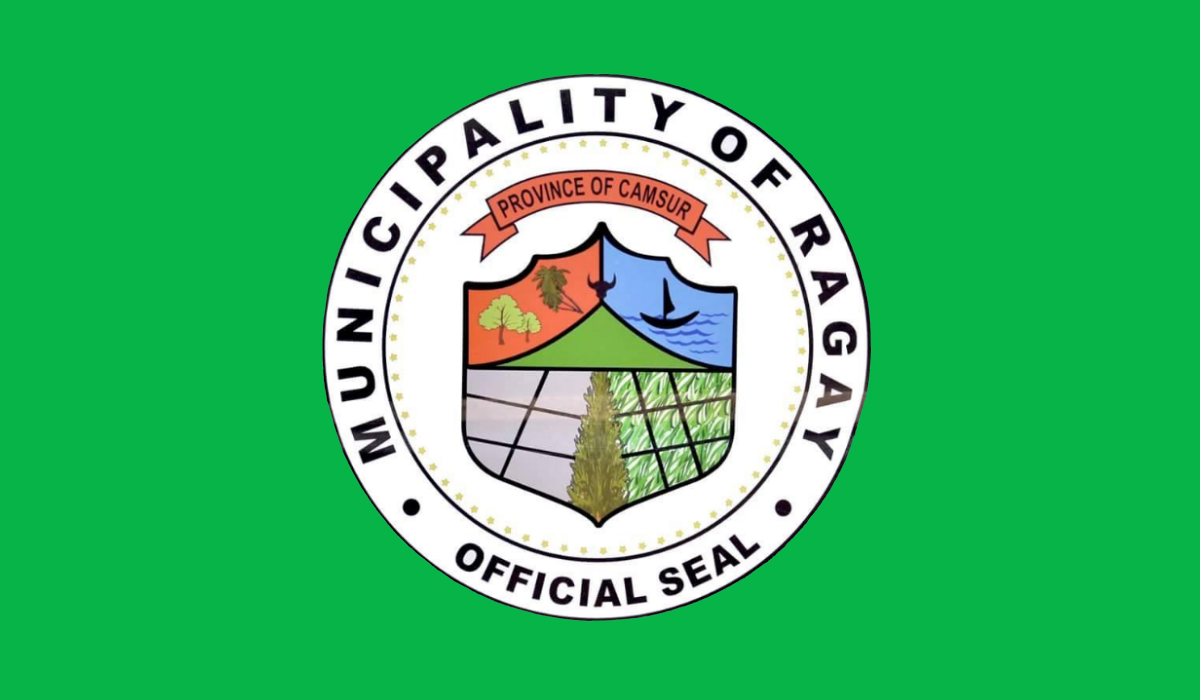
- Flag Seal

- Map of Camarines Sur with Ragay highlighted
- Interactive map of Ragay
- Location within the Philippines
- Coordinates: 13°49′18″N 122°47′23″E
- Country: Philippines
- Region: Bicol Region
- Province: Camarines Sur
- District: 1st district
- Founded: April 15, 1753
- Barangays: 38 (see Barangays)

Government
  - Type: Sangguniang Bayan
  - Mayor: Benchie G. Horibata
  - Vice Mayor: Giovanni A. Señar
  - Representative: Tsuyoshi Anthony G. Horibata
  - Municipal Council: Members: Elmer A. Linao; Annabelle R. Llabres; Domingo S. Cedo; Petronilo G. Mercado; Ricardo B. Aquino; Romano C. Sulit; Roderick L. Sandagon; Julio A. Aro
  - Electorate: 41,000 voters (2025)

Area
  - Total: 400.22 km^{2} (154.53 sq mi)
- Elevation: 62 m (203 ft)
- Highest elevation: 258 m (846 ft)
- Lowest elevation: 0 m (0 ft)

Population (2024 census)
  - Total: 58,843
  - Density: 147.03/km^{2} (380.80/sq mi)
  - Households: 14,112

Economy
  - Income class: 1st municipal income class
  - Poverty incidence: 27.75% (2023)
  - Revenue: ₱ 303 million (2024)
  - Assets: ₱ 1,236 million (2024)
  - Expenditure: ₱ 273.5 million (2024)
  - Liabilities: ₱ 186.9 million (2024)

Service provider
  - Electricity: Camarines Sur 1 Electric Cooperative (CASURECO 1)
- Time zone: UTC+8 (PST)
- ZIP code: 4410
- PSGC: 0501730000
- IDD : area code: +63 (0)54
- Native languages: Central Bikol; Tagalog; Manide
- Website: ragaycamsur.gov.ph

Ragay, officially the Municipality of Ragay (Central Bikol: Banwaan kan Ragay; Tagalog: Bayan ng Ragay), is a municipality in the province of Camarines Sur, Philippines. According to the 2024 census, it has a population of 58,843 people.

== History ==
Ragay was originally a visita of Lupi and became a separate town on April 15, 1753. The first settlement stood along the Paculago River and was inhabited by Bicol, Tagalog, and Visayan speaking groups. Frequent Moro raids forced residents to move to a safer area upstream. The new community was called Hagay, meaning single, and was occupied by Christian settlers. When raids stopped and the Spanish arrived, the town shifted to its present site. The name Ragay emerged in the 1840s after a Spanish soldier misheard a resident who mentioned Hagay.

== Churches ==
- Santísima Trinidad Parish - Poblacion
- San Lorenzo Ruíz Parish - Godofredo Reyes Sr
- Nuestra Señora de la Salvación Parish - Banga Caves
- San Andrés Apóstol Parish - Liboro
- Most Holy Trinity Parish Church-Poblacion Iraya, Ragay, Camarines Sur

== Geography ==
Ragay is 79 kilometres (49 mi) from the provincial capital town Pili and 317 kilometres (197 mi) from the country's capital city of Manila.

=== Barangays ===
Ragay is politically subdivided into 38 barangay's. Each barangay consists of puroks and some have sitios.

- Agao-ao
- Agrupacion
- Amomokpok
- Apad
- Apale
- Banga Caves
- Baya
- Binahan Proper
- Binahan Upper
- Buenasuerte
- Cabadisan
- Cabinitan
- Cabugao
- Caditaan
- Cale
- Godofredo Reyes Sr.(Catabangan)
- Catabangan Proper
- Inandawa
- Laguio
- Lanipga-Cawayan
- Liboro
- Lohong
- Lower Omon
- Lower Santa Cruz
- Panaytayan
- Panaytayan Nuevo
- Patalunan
- Poblacion Ilaod
- Poblacion Iraya
- Port Junction Norte
- Port Junction Sur
- Salvacion
- Samay
- San Rafael
- F. Simeon (Pugod)
- Tagbac
- Upper Omon
- Upper Santa Cruz

=== Climate ===
Climate data for Ragay, Camarines Sur
| Month | Jan | Feb | Mar | Apr | May | Jun | Jul | Aug | Sep | Oct | Nov | Dec | Year |
|---|---|---|---|---|---|---|---|---|---|---|---|---|---|
| Mean daily maximum °C (°F) | 32 (90) | 31 (88) | 35 (95) | 37 (99) | 37 (99) | 36 (97) | 36 (97) | 34 (93) | 35 (95) | 34 (93) | 33 (91) | 32 (90) | 34 (94) |
| Mean daily minimum °C (°F) | 27 (81) | 27 (81) | 28 (82) | 30 (86) | 31 (88) | 31 (88) | 30 (86) | 29 (84) | 29 (84) | 29 (84) | 28 (82) | 28 (82) | 29 (84) |
| Average precipitation mm (inches) | 159.85 (6.29) | 61.25 (2.41) | 60.56 (2.38) | 43.28 (1.70) | 69.32 (2.73) | 183.65 (7.23) | 346.37 (13.64) | 386.41 (15.21) | 281.42 (11.08) | 296.39 (11.67) | 389.18 (15.32) | 119.9 (4.72) | 2,397.58 (94.38) |
| Average rainy days | 26 | 22 | 22 | 18 | 20 | 26 | 30 | 31 | 28 | 28 | 30 | 28 | 309 |
Source: World Weather Online

== Demographics ==
Population census of Ragay
| Year | Pop. | ±% p.a. |
|---|---|---|
| 1903 | 2,344 | — |
| 1918 | 3,811 | +3.29% |
| 1939 | 11,514 | +5.41% |
| 1948 | 20,062 | +6.36% |
| 1960 | 27,925 | +2.79% |
| 1970 | 32,635 | +1.57% |
| 1975 | 32,798 | +0.10% |
| 1980 | 34,891 | +1.24% |
| 1990 | 41,438 | +1.73% |
| 1995 | 44,154 | +1.20% |
| 2000 | 47,743 | +1.69% |
| 2007 | 52,021 | +1.19% |
| 2010 | 54,934 | +2.00% |
| 2015 | 58,214 | +1.11% |
| 2020 | 59,770 | +0.56% |
| 2024 | 58,843 | −0.37% |
Source: Philippine Statistics Authority

In the 2024 census, the population of Ragay was 58,843 people, with a density of 150 inhabitants per square kilometre or 390 inhabitants per square mile.

== Economy ==
Poverty incidence of Ragay (%)

Source: Philippine Statistics Authority

== Transportation ==
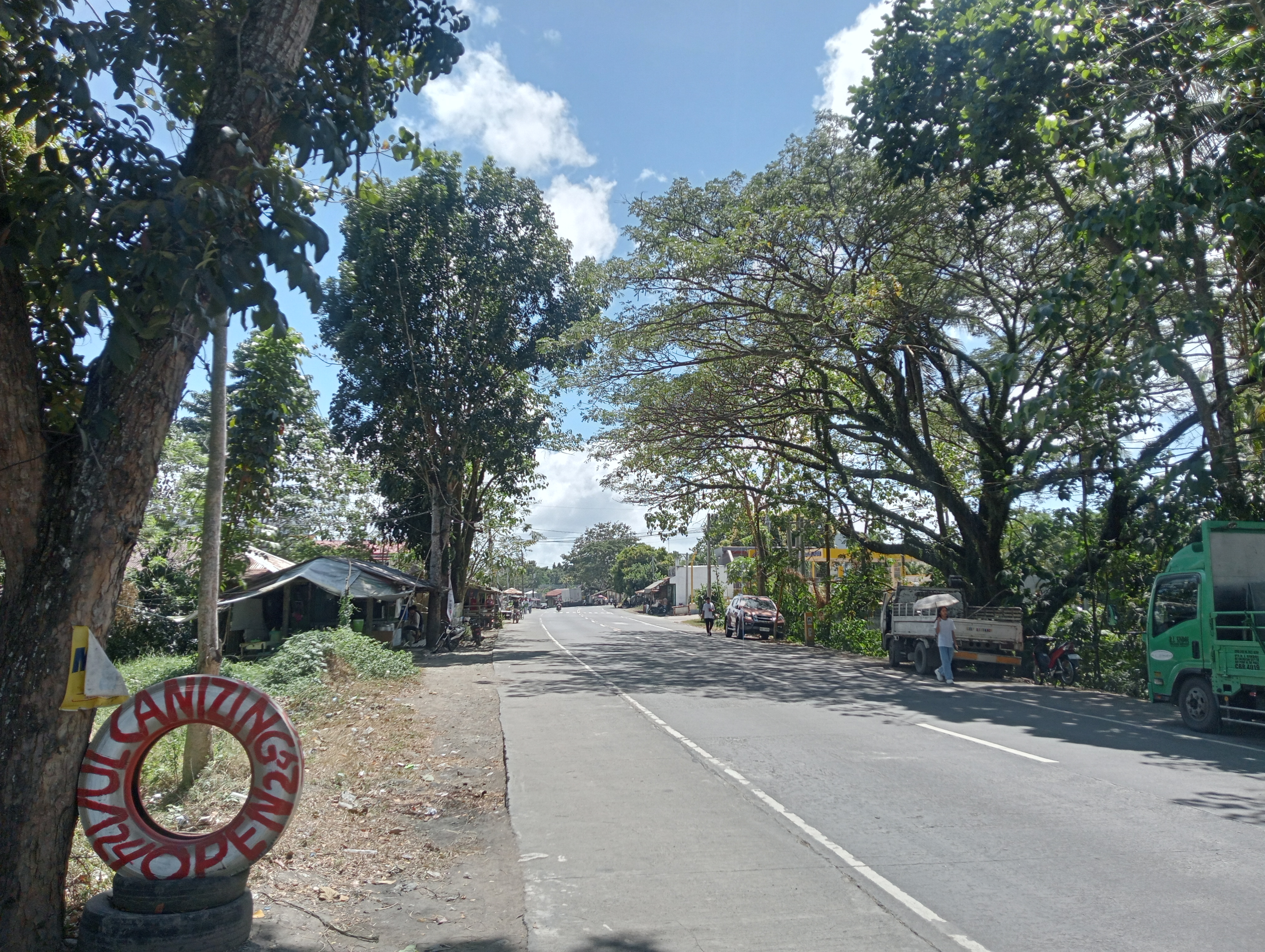
A portion of Andaya Highway in Ragay town

The municipality is connected with Manila by the Andaya Highway and daily rail services to and from Naga & Legazpi are provided by the Philippine National Railways.

In order to spur development in the municipality, The Toll Regulatory Board declared Toll Road 5 the extension of South Luzon Expressway. A 420-kilometer, four lane expressway starting from the terminal point of the now under construction SLEX Toll Road 4 at Barangay Mayao, Lucena City in Quezon to Matnog, Sorsogon, near the Matnog Ferry Terminal. On August 25, 2020, San Miguel Corporation announced that they will invest the project which will reduce travel time from Lucena to Matnog from 9 hours to 5.5 hours.

Another expressway that will serve Ragay is the Quezon-Bicol Expressway (QuBEx), which will link between Lucena and San Fernando, Camarines Sur.

== Education ==
The Ragay Schools District Office governs all educational institutions within the municipality. It oversees the management and operations of all private and public, from primary to secondary schools.

=== Primary and elementary schools ===
- Agao-ao Elementary School
- Agrupacion Elementary School
- Apad Elementary School
- Apale Elementary School
- Arborvitae Plains Montessori
- Bagasimbahan Elementary School
- Banga Elementary School
- Baya Elementary School
- Berachah Christian School
- Binahan Elementary School
- Buenasuerte Elementary School
- Cabadisan Elementary School
- Cabinitan Elementary School
- Cabugao Elementary School
- Caditaan Elementary School
- Catabangan Proper Elementary School
- Cawayan Elementary School
- Godofredo Reyes Sr. Elementary School
- GRS SDA Multigrade School
- Laguio Elementary School
- Liboro Elementary School
- Lohong Elementary School
- Lower Omon Elementary School
- Lower Sta Cruz Elementary School
- Marian Formation Center
- Mother Immaculate & Infant Jesus Learning Center
- Omon SDA Multigrade School
- Panaytayan Elementary School
- Panaytayan Nuevo Elementary School
- Patalunan Elementary School
- Port Junction Adventist Elementary School
- Port Junction Elementary School
- Pugod Elementary School
- Ragay Central School
- Ragay SDA Multigrade School
- Salvacion Elementary School
- Samay Elementary School
- San Rafael Elementary School
- St. Salome Early Riser Montessori School
- Tagbac Elementary School
- Upper Omon Elementary School
- Upper Sta. Cruz Elementary School

=== Secondary schools ===
- Arborvitae Plains Montessori
- Cristobal D. Aquino Memorial High School
- Don M. Gonzalvo Memorial High School
- Godofredo Reyes Sr. National HS
- Quezon Camarines High School
- Ragay National Agricultural and Fisheries School
- Ragay Science and Math Oriented High School
- Simeon Tycangco Memorial High School
- Sisa Feliciano Memorial High School
- Tomas A. Andaya Sr. National High School

=== Higher educational institution ===
- Polytechnic University of the Philippines - Ragay (est. 1993)

== Gallery ==
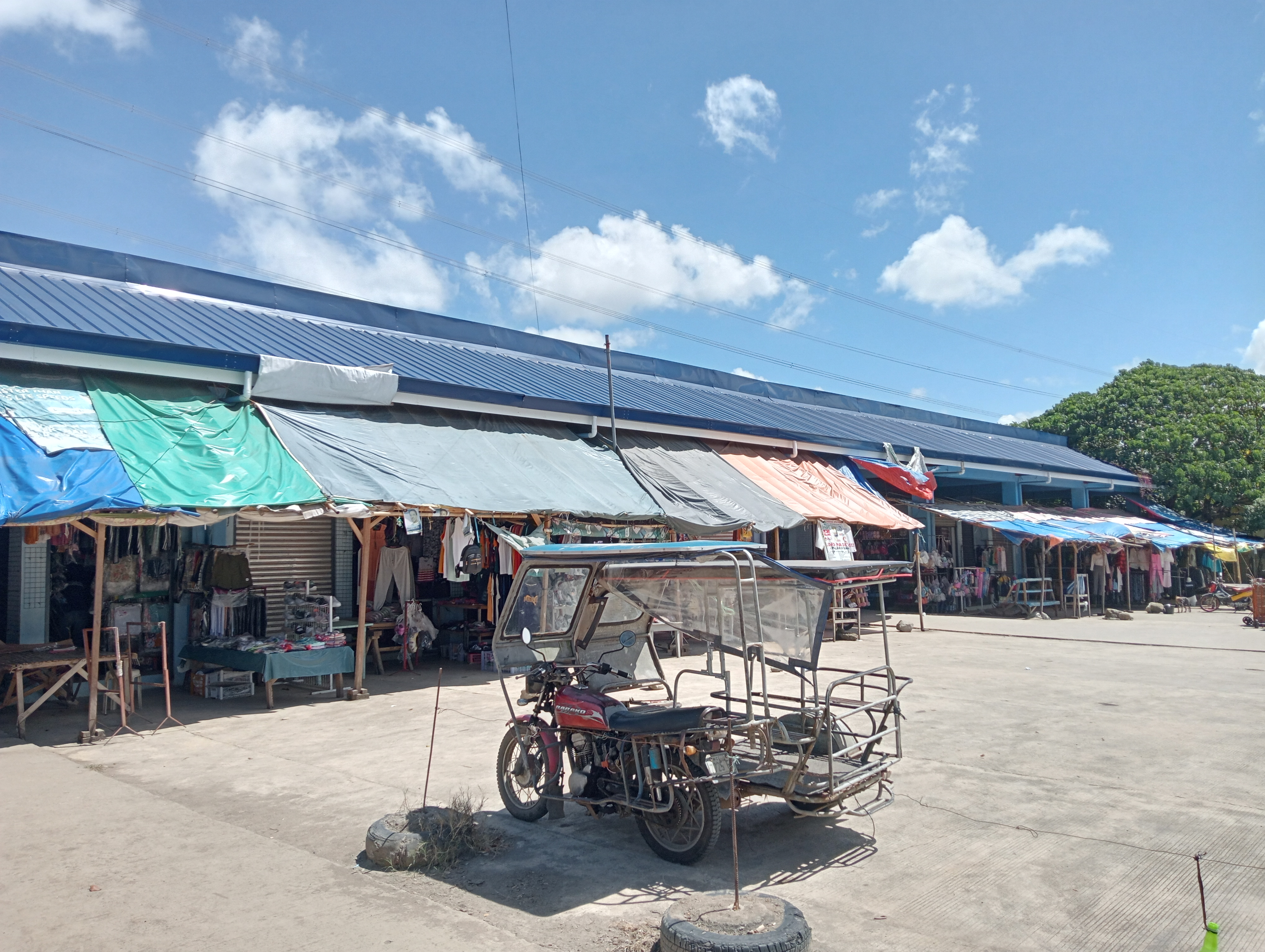
Godofredo Reyes Sr. (GRS) Public Market

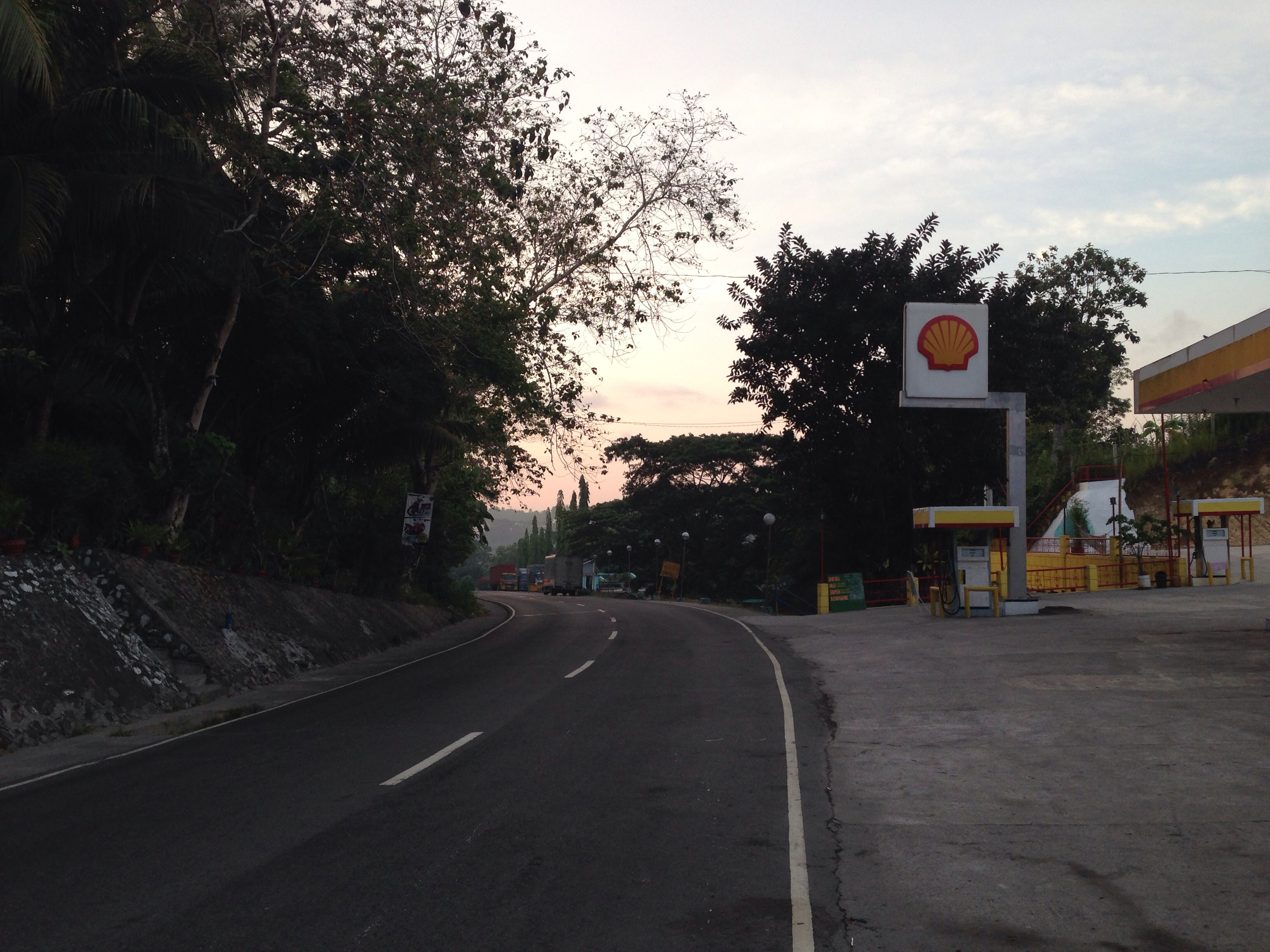
Rolando R. Andaya Highway near Poblacion Iraya

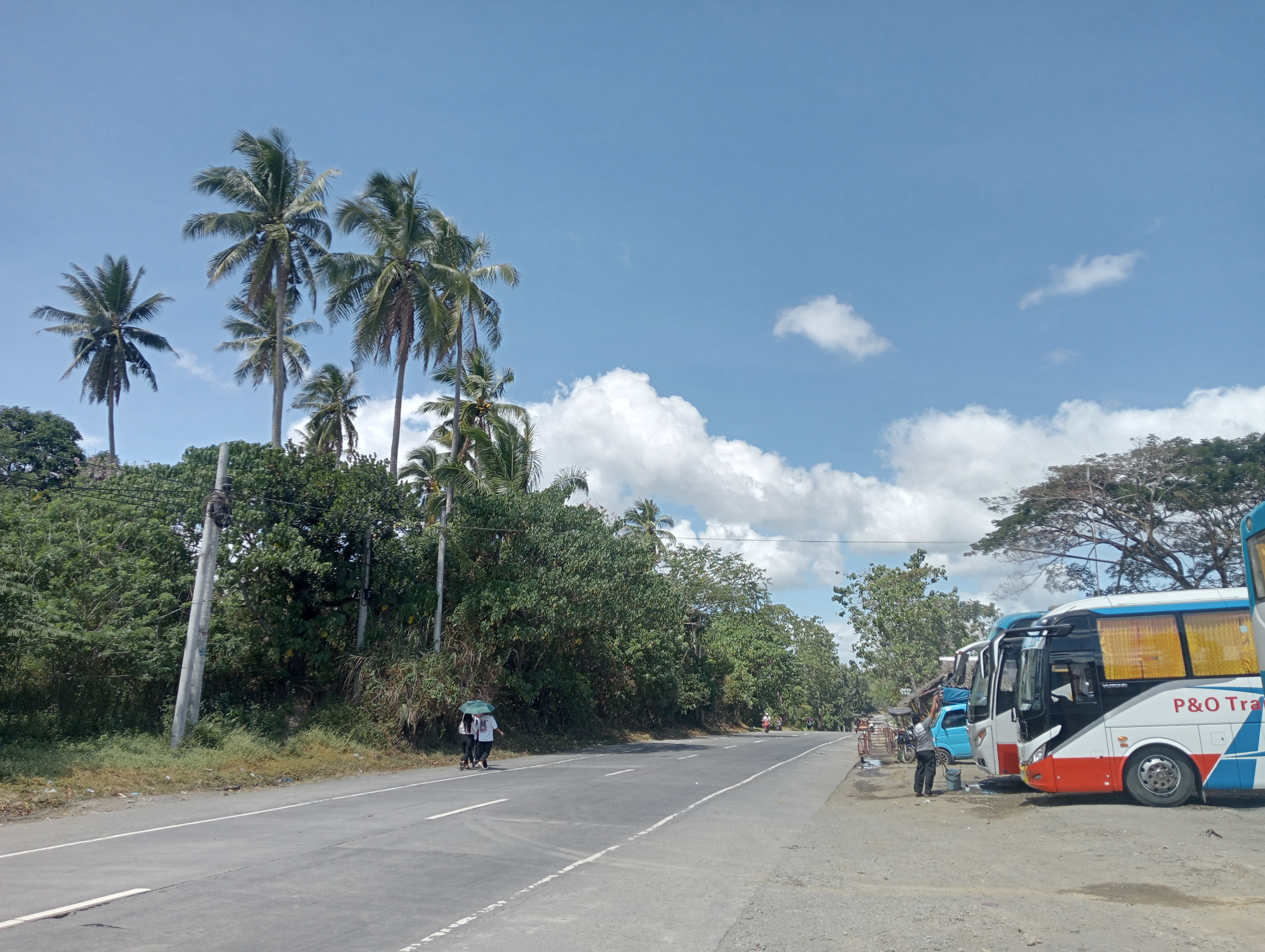
Rolando R. Andaya Highway near Godofredo Reyes Sr. (GRS)

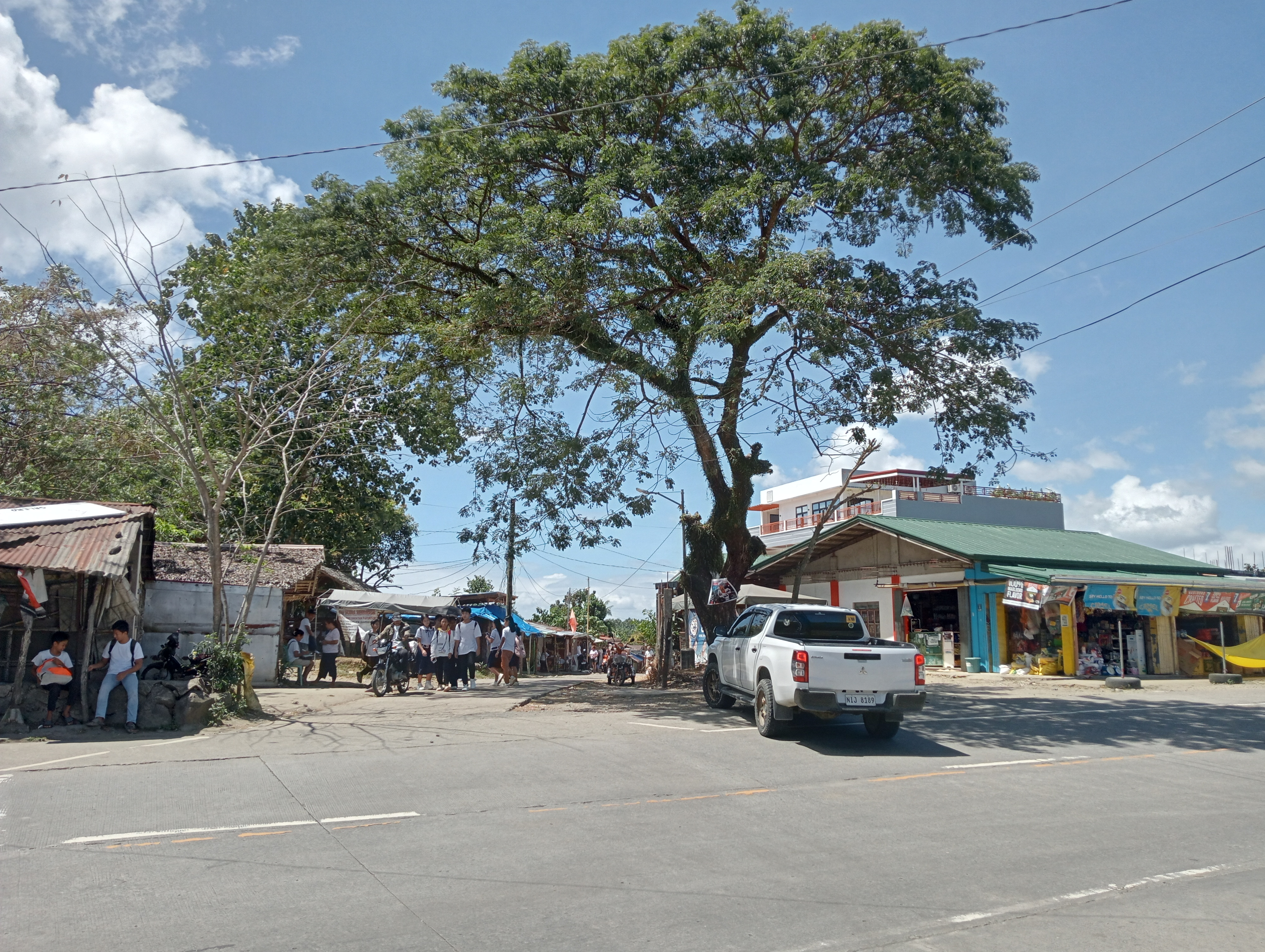
Godofredo Reyes Sr. (GRS) Barangay Proper
