= Lupi, Camarines Sur =

Municipality in Camarines Sur, Philippines

Lupi
- Municipality
- Municipality of Lupi
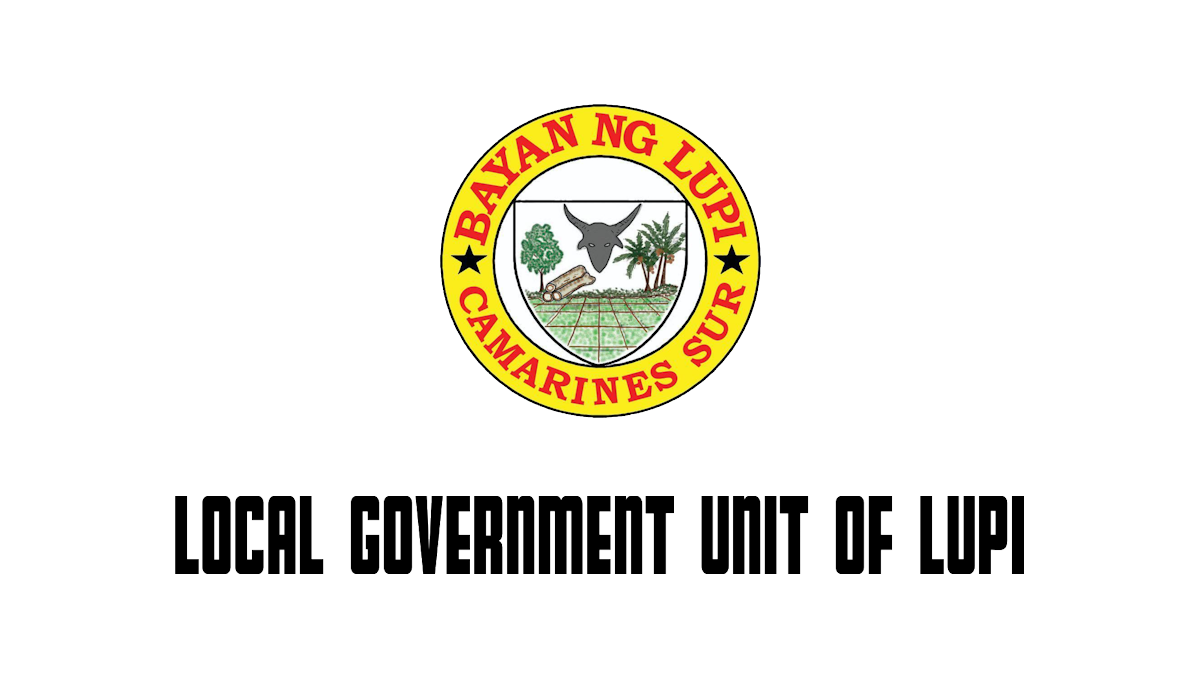
- Flag Seal

- Map of Camarines Sur with Lupi highlighted
- Interactive map of Lupi
- Location within the Philippines
- Coordinates: 13°47′27″N 122°54′33″E
- Country: Philippines
- Region: Bicol Region
- Province: Camarines Sur
- District: 1st district
- Founded: October 17, 1726
- Barangays: 38 (see Barangays)

Government
  - Type: Sangguniang Bayan
  - Mayor: Christopher V. Jacinto
  - Vice Mayor: Noel A. Agravante
  - Representative: Tsuyoshi Anthony G. Horibata
  - Municipal Council: Members: Ivan Joseph N. Riego; Aristotle M. Macalindong; Josie S. Acero; Jocely M. Osabal; Florezil A. Lorio; Josephine G. Fandiño; Edwin B. Barquilla; Jesus C. Bandagoza Jr.
  - Electorate: 22,585 voters (2025)

Area
  - Total: 199.12 km^{2} (76.88 sq mi)
- Elevation: 81 m (266 ft)
- Highest elevation: 220 m (720 ft)
- Lowest elevation: 15 m (49 ft)

Population (2024 census)
  - Total: 33,474
  - Density: 168.11/km^{2} (435.40/sq mi)
  - Households: 8,256

Economy
  - Income class: 2nd municipal income class
  - Poverty incidence: 28.13% (2023)
  - Revenue: ₱ 188.6 million (2024)
  - Assets: ₱ 572.1 million (2024)
  - Expenditure: ₱ 147.2 million (2024)
  - Liabilities: ₱ 119.7 million (2024)

Service provider
  - Electricity: Camarines Sur 1 Electric Cooperative (CASURECO 1)
- Time zone: UTC+8 (PST)
- ZIP code: 4409
- PSGC: 0501719000
- IDD : area code: +63 (0)54
- Native languages: Central Bikol; Tagalog; Manide

Lupi, officially the Municipality of Lupi (Central Bikol: Banwaan kan Lupi; Tagalog: Bayan ng Lupi), is a municipality in the province of Camarines Sur, Philippines. According to the 2024 census, it has a population of 33,474 people.

The town was known as a travelling población as it had been transferred several times when it was a small settlement during Spanish colonization. Lupi was also united with Sipocot in the late Spanish era and was also the home of Franciscans and Dominicans. Lupi is a famous tourist attraction in its surrounding area because of the Bicol national park and its rivers. Its major imports are coconuts, copra and pineapples.

== History ==
Lupi started as a Franciscan mission in 1701 under Fr. Juan de la Hoz. In 1726, the settlement was moved from the Ragay mountains due to health issues. On October 17, 1726, Lupi became a town and its parish was set up under St. Peter Baptist. On that day, the Spanish government under the administration of Governor General Marquéz de Torrecampo who was also the titular head of the Diocese of Caceres, issued a decree making Lupi a separate town.

== Geography ==
Lupi is 63 kilometres (39 mi) from the provincial capital town Pili and 333 kilometres (207 mi) from the country's capital city of Manila.

=== Barangays ===
Lupi is politically subdivided into 38 barangays. Each barangay consists of puroks and some have sitios.

- Alleomar
- Bagangan Sr.
- Bagong Sikat
- Bel-Cruz
- Bangon
- Barrera Jr.
- Barrera Sr.
- Belwang
- Buenasuerte
- Bulawan Jr.
- Bulawan Sr.
- Cabutagan
- Casay
- Colacling (Del Rosario)
- Cristo Rey
- Del Carmen
- Haguimit
- Halubán (Pigbasagan)
- Kaibigan
- La Purísima
- Lourdes
- Mangcawayan
- Napolidan
- Población
- Polantuna
- Sagrada
- Salvación
- San Isidro
- San José
- San Pedro
- San Rafael Norte
- San Rafael Sur
- San Ramon
- San Vicente
- Sooc
- Tanawán
- Tible
- Tapi (Lupi Nuevo)

=== Climate ===
Climate data for Lupi, Camarines Sur
| Month | Jan | Feb | Mar | Apr | May | Jun | Jul | Aug | Sep | Oct | Nov | Dec | Year |
|---|---|---|---|---|---|---|---|---|---|---|---|---|---|
| Mean daily maximum °C (°F) | 33 (91) | 32 (90) | 35 (95) | 37 (99) | 38 (100) | 36 (97) | 35 (95) | 33 (91) | 35 (95) | 34 (93) | 33 (91) | 32 (90) | 34 (94) |
| Mean daily minimum °C (°F) | 27 (81) | 27 (81) | 29 (84) | 31 (88) | 32 (90) | 32 (90) | 31 (88) | 29 (84) | 30 (86) | 29 (84) | 28 (82) | 28 (82) | 29 (85) |
| Average precipitation mm (inches) | 36.66 (1.44) | 58.6 (2.31) | 37.91 (1.49) | 76.31 (3.00) | 98.34 (3.87) | 151.99 (5.98) | 288.39 (11.35) | 291.41 (11.47) | 186.77 (7.35) | 363.21 (14.30) | 97.5 (3.84) | 292.1 (11.50) | 1,979.19 (77.9) |
| Average rainy days | 18 | 23 | 16 | 17 | 25 | 28 | 31 | 26 | 27 | 29 | 24 | 29 | 293 |
Source: World Weather Online

== Demographics ==
Population census of Lupi
| Year | Pop. | ±% p.a. |
|---|---|---|
| 1903 | 1,307 | — |
| 1918 | 1,515 | +0.99% |
| 1939 | 3,455 | +4.00% |
| 1948 | 6,513 | +7.30% |
| 1960 | 16,981 | +8.31% |
| 1970 | 18,419 | +0.82% |
| 1975 | 19,682 | +1.34% |
| 1980 | 21,216 | +1.51% |
| 1990 | 24,809 | +1.58% |
| 1995 | 25,390 | +0.43% |
| 2000 | 26,148 | +0.63% |
| 2007 | 27,630 | +0.76% |
| 2010 | 30,118 | +3.19% |
| 2015 | 32,167 | +1.26% |
| 2020 | 33,897 | +1.11% |
| 2024 | 33,474 | −0.30% |
Source: Philippine Statistics Authority

In the 2024 census, the population of Lupi was 33,474 people, with a density of 170 inhabitants per square kilometre or 440 inhabitants per square mile.

== Economy ==
Poverty incidence of Lupi (%)

Source: Philippine Statistics Authority

== Transportation ==
The municipality is connected with Manila by the Andaya Highway and daily rail services to and from Naga & Legazpi are provided by the Philippine National Railways.

In order to spur development in the municipality, The Toll Regulatory Board declared Toll Road 5 the extension of South Luzon Expressway. A 420-kilometer, four lane expressway starting from the terminal point of the now under construction SLEX Toll Road 4 at Barangay Mayao, Lucena City in Quezon to Matnog, Sorsogon, near the Matnog Ferry Terminal. On August 25, 2020, San Miguel Corporation announced that they will invest the project which will reduce travel time from Lucena to Matnog from 9 hours to 5.5 hours.

Another expressway that will serve Lupi is the Quezon-Bicol Expressway (QuBEx), which will link between Lucena and San Fernando, Camarines Sur.

== Churches ==
- San Pedro Bautista Parish - Poblacion (est. 1726)
- Sagrada Família Parish - Colacling (est. 2006)
- San Juan Pablo II Parish - Casay (est. 2011)
- San Juan Vianney Mission Station - San Jose, formerly Alanao (est. 2022)

== Education ==
The Lupi Schools District Office governs all educational institutions within the municipality. It oversees the management and operations of all private and public, from primary to secondary schools.

=== Primary and elementary schools ===
- Alanao Elementary School
- Badas Elementary School
- Bagangan Jr. Elementary School
- Bagangan Sr. Elementary School
- Bagong Sikat Elementary School
- Bangon Elementary School
- Barrera Elementary School
- Bel-Cruz Elementary School
- Belwang Elementary School
- Buenasuerte Comm School
- Bulagwin Primary School
- Bulawan Sr. Elementary School
- Cabutagan Elementary School
- Casay Elementary School
- Colacling Elementary School
- Cristo Rey Elementary School
- Del Carmen Elementary School
- Haluban Elementary School
- Lourdes Elementary School
- Lupi Central School
- Mangcawayan Primary School
- Napolidan Elementary School
- Polantuna Elementary School
- Sagrada Elementary School
- SAN RAFAEL SUR Primary School
- San Vicente Elementary School
- Sooc Elementary School
- Tanawan Elementary School
- Tapi Elementary School
- Tible Elementary School
- San Pedro Elementary School
- San Rafael Norte Elementary School
- Salvacion Primary School

=== Secondary schools ===
- Casay National High School
- Colacling National High School
- Colegio Dela Virgen Del Pilar
- Haluban National High School
- Lupi-Iligan National High School
- San Jose Alanao High School
- St. Peter Baptist College Foundation

=== Higher educational institution ===
- St. Peter Baptist College Foundation
