= Cabusao =

Municipality in Camarines Sur, Philippines

- Municipality
- Municipality of Cabusao
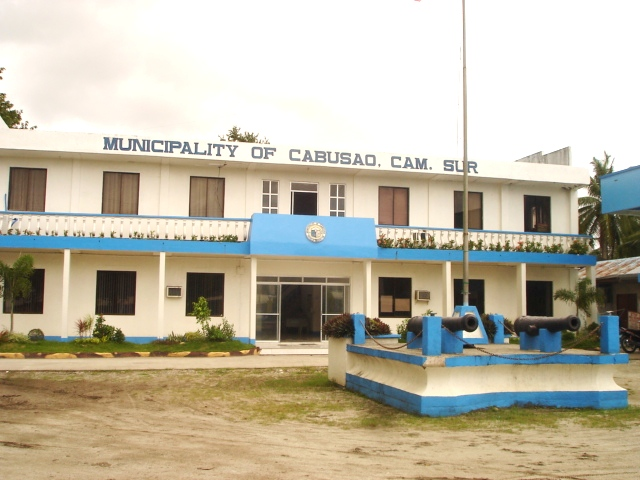
- Municipal Hall

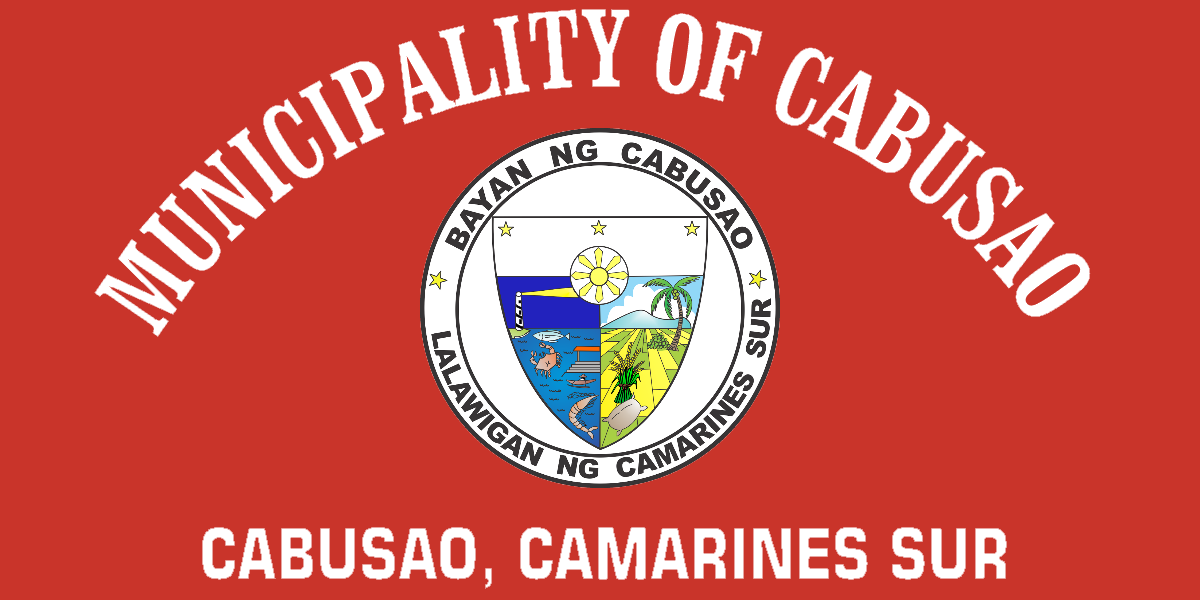
- Flag Seal

- Map of Camarines Sur with Cabusao highlighted
- Interactive map of Cabusao
- Location within the Philippines
- Coordinates: 13°43′39″N 123°06′51″E
- Country: Philippines
- Region: Bicol Region
- Province: Camarines Sur
- District: 1st district
- Founded: May 20, 1911
- Barangays: 9 (see Barangays)

Government
  - Type: Sangguniang Bayan
  - Mayor: Jose Gil A. Aguilar, Jr.
  - Vice Mayor: Jopito O. Agualada
  - Representative: Tsuyoshi Anthony G. Horibata
  - City Council: Members: Christopher B. Candelaria; Cherry Lou L. Ong; Jerry Y. Aguilar; Samuel G. Prado; Michelle E. Eborde; Gabriel N. Hernandez; Jaime J. Tolentino; Ronald C. San Diego
  - Electorate: 14,904 voters (2025)

Area
  - Total: 46.80 km^{2} (18.07 sq mi)
- Elevation: 2.0 m (6.6 ft)
- Highest elevation: 14 m (46 ft)
- Lowest elevation: −2 m (−6.6 ft)

Population (2024 census)
  - Total: 18,882
  - Density: 403.5/km^{2} (1,045/sq mi)
  - Households: 4,360
- Demonym: Cabusaoeños

Economy
  - Income class: 4th municipal income class
  - Poverty incidence: 27.32% (2023)
  - Revenue: ₱ 120.6 million (2024)
  - Assets: ₱ 599.3 million (2024)
  - Expenditure: ₱ 115.1 million (2024)
  - Liabilities: ₱ 101.5 million (2024)

Service provider
  - Electricity: Camarines Sur 1 Electric Cooperative (CASURECO 1)
- Time zone: UTC+8 (PST)
- ZIP code: 4406
- PSGC: 0501707000
- IDD : area code: +63 (0)54
- Native languages: Central Bikol; Tagalog
- Website: www.cabusao.gov.ph

Cabusao, officially the Municipality of Cabusao (Central Bikol: Banwaan kan Cabusao; Tagalog: Bayan ng Cabusao), is a municipality in the province of Camarines Sur, Philippines. According to the 2024 census, it has a population of 18,882 people.

The town is known for its natural scenery, with green landscapes, clean beaches, and wide ocean views. It offers a setting for visitors who enjoy nature and quiet surroundings.

== History ==
There is no formal evidence of the town's establishment, but according to some locals, it was established on May 20, 1911, same day with the feast of San Bernardino de Siena (town's patron saint) and church establishment in honor of him.

Fishing still remains as the major industry in the Cabusao town in the first district of the province. There are attempts, however, to improve the rice production which can only be done if the farmlands can be improved despite the salty soil.

In Barangay San Pedro in this municipality, the Bicol Sanitarium can be found, where leprous patients are treated and taken care of.

== Geography ==
=== Barangays ===
Cabusao is politically subdivided into 9 barangays. Each barangay consists of puroks and some have sitios.

- Barcelonita
- Biong
- Camagong
- Castillo
- New Poblacion
- Pandan
- San Pedro
- Santa Cruz
- Santa Lutgarda

Santa Lutgarda was formerly the Barrio Poblacion; the seat of the municipal government and the town's Catholic church. Through the effort of Mayor Teofilo Santiago, those two major symbol of local power was transferred to the neighboring Barrio Buenavista, presently Barangay New Poblacion. However, the name "Poblacion" is still an integral part of Santa Lutgarda and can be found side by side with the official name (Santa Lutgarda de Bravante).

=== Climate ===
Climate data for Cabusao, Camarines Sur
Month	Jan	Feb	Mar	Apr	May	Jun	Jul	Aug	Sep	Oct	Nov	Dec	Year
Mean daily maximum °C (°F)	33 (91)	31 (88)	35 (95)	37 (99)	38 (100)	37 (99)	36 (97)	34 (93)	35 (95)	34 (93)	33 (91)	32 (90)	35 (94)
Mean daily minimum °C (°F)	27 (81)	27 (81)	29 (84)	31 (88)	32 (90)	32 (90)	30 (86)	29 (84)	30 (86)	29 (84)	28 (82)	28 (82)	29 (85)
Average precipitation mm (inches)	44.2 (1.74)	52.17 (2.05)	45.43 (1.79)	92.29 (3.63)	182.23 (7.17)	289.11 (11.38)	260.6 (10.26)	180.07 (7.09)	340.22 (13.39)	98.7 (3.89)	337.4 (13.28)	81 (3.2)	2,003.42 (78.87)
Average rainy days	21	22	19	24	26	30	29	27	29	24	29	28	308
Source: World Weather Online

Cabusao has varying dry and wet seasons. The dry season begins late March through May and the wet season starts early June through October. The climate and soil are suited for almost all kinds of agricultural crops. Northwest monsoon winds prevail during the months of late October to March. Southwest monsoon starts from June and ends in October.

== Demographics ==
Population census of Cabusao
Year	Pop.	±% p.a.
1918	2,559	—
1939	4,743	+2.98%
1948	5,130	+0.88%
1960	8,020	+3.79%
1970	9,078	+1.25%
1975	10,110	+2.18%
1980	10,844	+1.41%
1990	15,305	+3.51%
1995	15,966	+0.80%
2000	16,201	+0.31%
2007	17,599	+1.15%
2010	18,049	+0.92%
2015	18,397	+0.36%
2020	19,257	+0.97%
2024	18,882	−0.47%
Source: Philippine Statistics Authority

In the 2024 census, the population of Cabusao was 18,882 people, with a density of 400 inhabitants per square kilometre or 1,000 inhabitants per square mile.

=== Religion ===
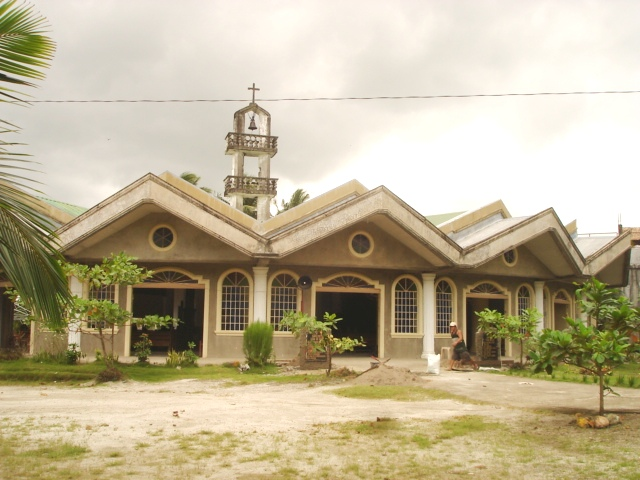
San Bernardino de Siena Parish Church

The municipality is composed of two Catholic parishes, the San Bernardino de Siena Parish and the San Pascual Baylon Parish. Every barangay hold its own barangay fiesta to honor their village patron saint. During that event, the village is lavishly decorated, especially the route of the processions.

The Roman Catholic Church and the local authorities work side by side for the local fiestas. Although there is a separation of church and state, as stated in the country's constitution, the Catholic Church operates within the society. The present pastoral program is geared toward organizing and strengthening the SKK (saradit na kristiyanong komunidad), which means BEC, basic ecclesial community. Rev. Fr. Apolinar "Yonyon" Rull Napoles Jr. organized the housing projects for the victims of typhoon "Reming" (International name Durian). There are two new villages in the place called Dusayan Village (Caritas International) and the San Rafael GK (Gawad Kalinga) Village, both located in the north-east of barangay Castillo.

Among the non-Catholic religions are the Iglesia ni Cristo, Ang Dating Daan, Jesus Miracle Crusade and very small number of mainline Protestants.

The parish of St. Bernardine of Siena was founded in 1914. The Feastday is every 20th day of May.

The following is the list of parish priests:

1. Fr. Santiago Bufete 1914-1915
2. Fr. Fermin Borja 1915-1917
3. Fr. Juan Villareal 1917-1940
4. Fr. Brigido Villar 1941-1944
5. Fr. Mariano Surtida1944
6. Fr. Catalino Reyes 1944-1946
7. Fr. Jorge Prepotente 1946-1947
8. Fr. Vicente R. Ojeda 1947
9. Fr. Basilio Quimpo 1947-1949
10. Fr. Thomas Bernales 1949-1955
11. Fr. Vicente Ramin 1955-1959
12. Fr. Roque Maravillas 1959-1969
13. Fr. Bonifacio De Vera 1969-1974
14. Fr. Manuel C. Ricafort 1974-1979
15. Fr. Edgar S. Pan 1979-1982
16. Fr. John E. Tria 1982-1985
17. Fr. Oscar P. Paraiso 1985-1991
18. Fr. Luis Chito S. Valenciano 1991-1992
19. Fr. Solh B. Saez 1992-1996
20. Fr. Antonio A. Aureus 1996-1999
21. Fr. Michael Alnor R. Dela Rosa 1999-2005
22. Fr. Apolinar R. Napoles Jr. 2005 January – 2008 October
23. Fr. Arvin G. Olivan 2008 October–June 2014
24. Fr. Cristito M. Testa June 2014−2018
25. Fr. Ruel A. Verdan 2018−2023
26. Fr. Ian Trillanes 2023−2024
27. Fr. Edgardo Abogado 2024-present

LIST OF PARISH PRIESTS Youtube CLICK HERE

== Economy ==
Poverty incidence of Cabusao (%)

Source: Philippine Statistics Authority

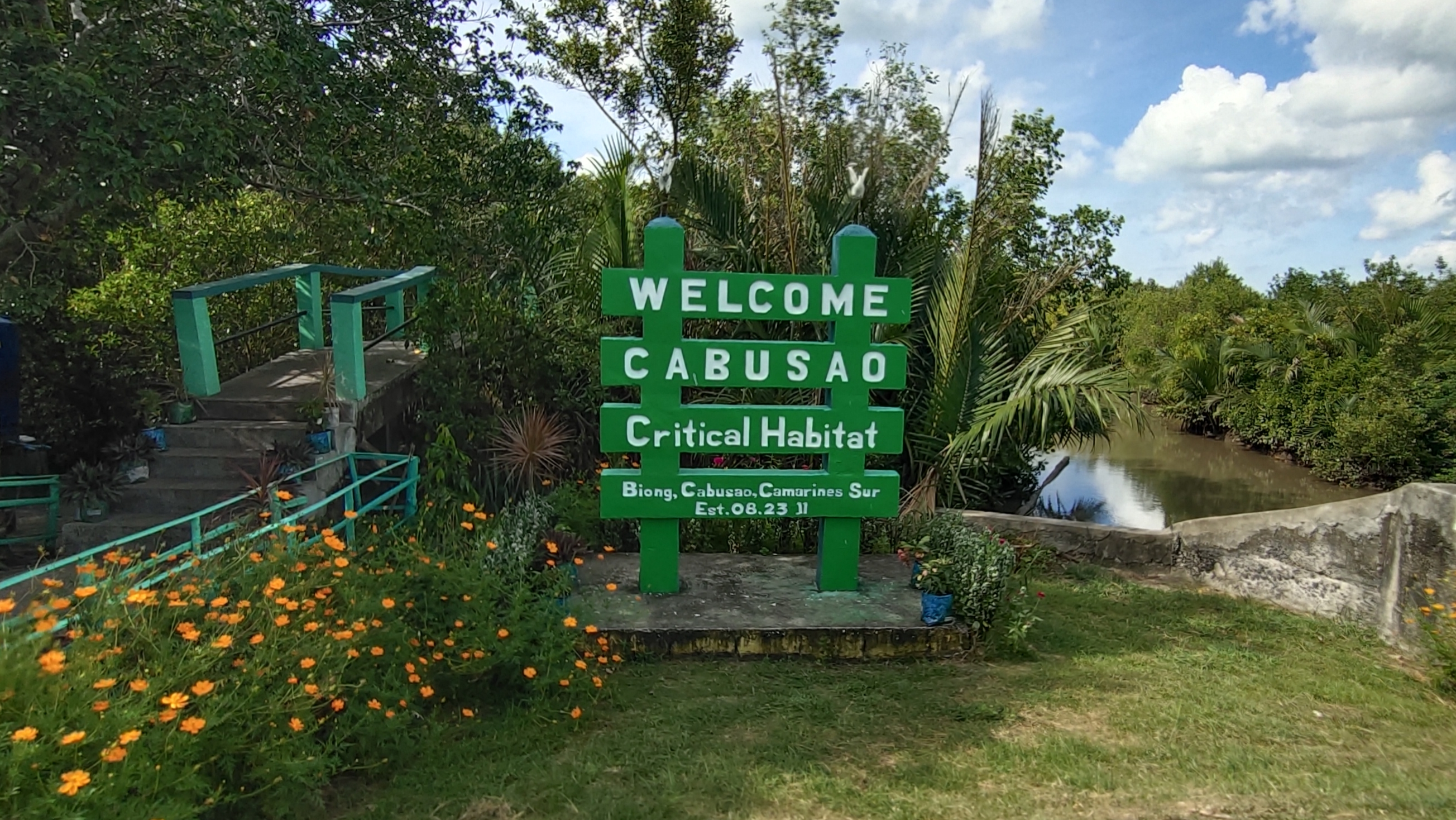
Cabusao Critical Habitat

Cabusao is basically an agricultural town where most of its constituents are engaged in farming and fishing.

In 1997, agricultural workers reached to about 37.53% while 62.47% were non-agricultural workers.

Crop Production
Rice is the major agricultural crop grown in the municipality. Other crops planted in the municipality are coconut, root crops, vegetables and fruit bearing tree. The production pattern is generally two croppings a year in the area served by irrigation

Livestock Production
There are various livestock raisers in the municipality located in all barangays. Commercial raisers or cattle have their pastures and grazing grounds maintained. Poultry production is a very profitable business. There are numerous commercial raisers engaged in egg production.

Fisheries and Aquatic Resources
The municipality has vast fishing grounds situated at the San Miguel Bay. Bangus fry is abundantly catch during summer and thus constitutes to the revenues of the municipality. Presently, there are a large number of motorized and non-motorized fishing bancas used commonly by the fishermen on their fishing activities. The fishing method/gear used commonly by the fishermen includes hook and line, beach seines, gill nets, scissors nets, multiple hands lines and cabiao.

== Education ==
The Cabusao Schools District Office governs all educational institutions within the municipality. It oversees the management and operations of all private and public, from primary to secondary schools.

=== Primary and elementary schools ===
- Barcelonita Elementary School
- Biong Elementary School
- Cabusao Central School
- Camagong Elementary School
- Castillo Elementary School
- Pandan Elementary School
- San Pedro Elementary School
- Sta. Cruz Elementary School

=== Secondary schools ===
- Barcelonita Fishery School
- Sta. Lutgarda National High School

== Churches ==
- San Bernardino de Siena Parish - Poblacion (est.1911)
- San Pascual Baylón Parish - Barcelonita (est.1935)
