= Gainza =

Municipality in Camarines Sur, Philippines

- Municipality
- Municipality of Gainza
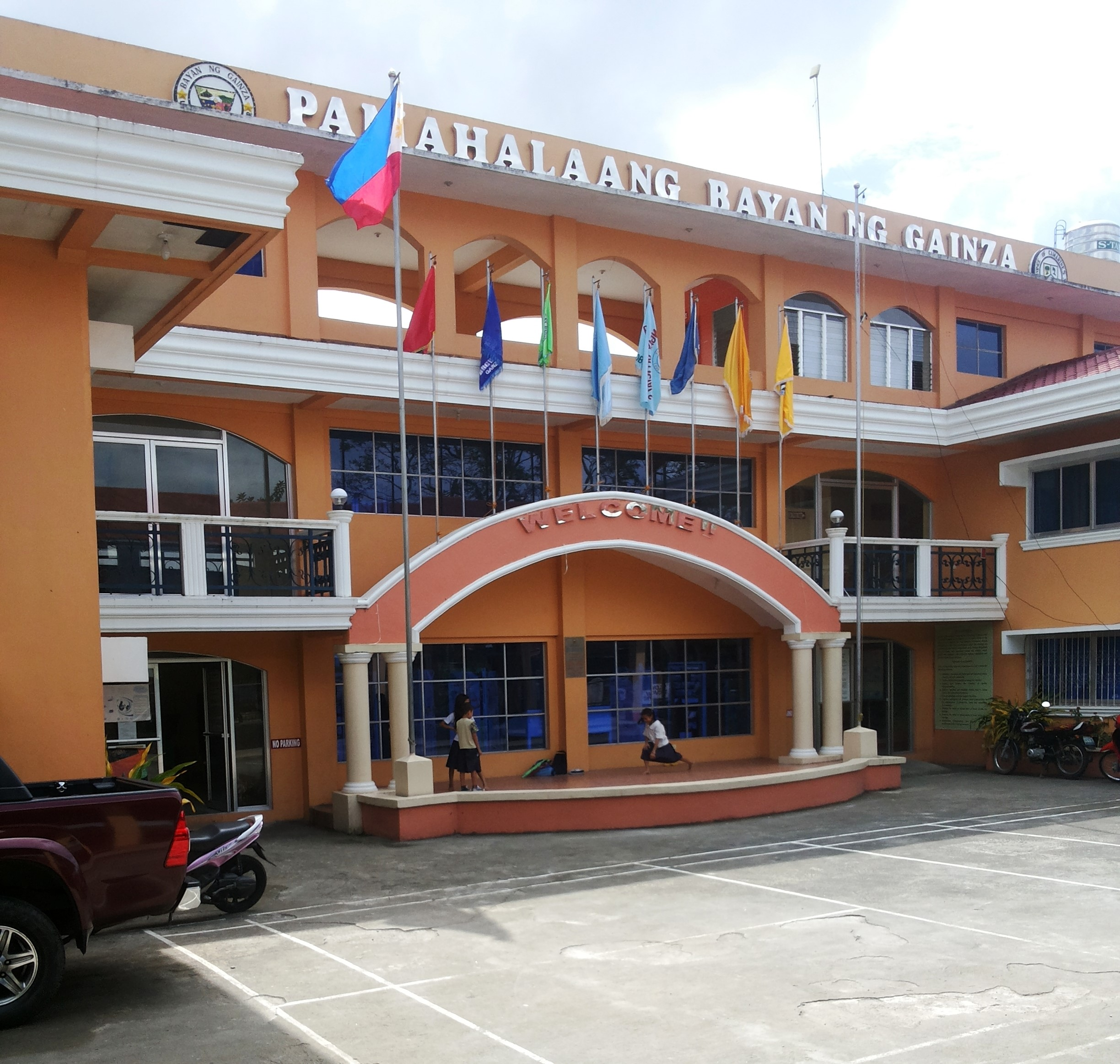
- Municipal Hall

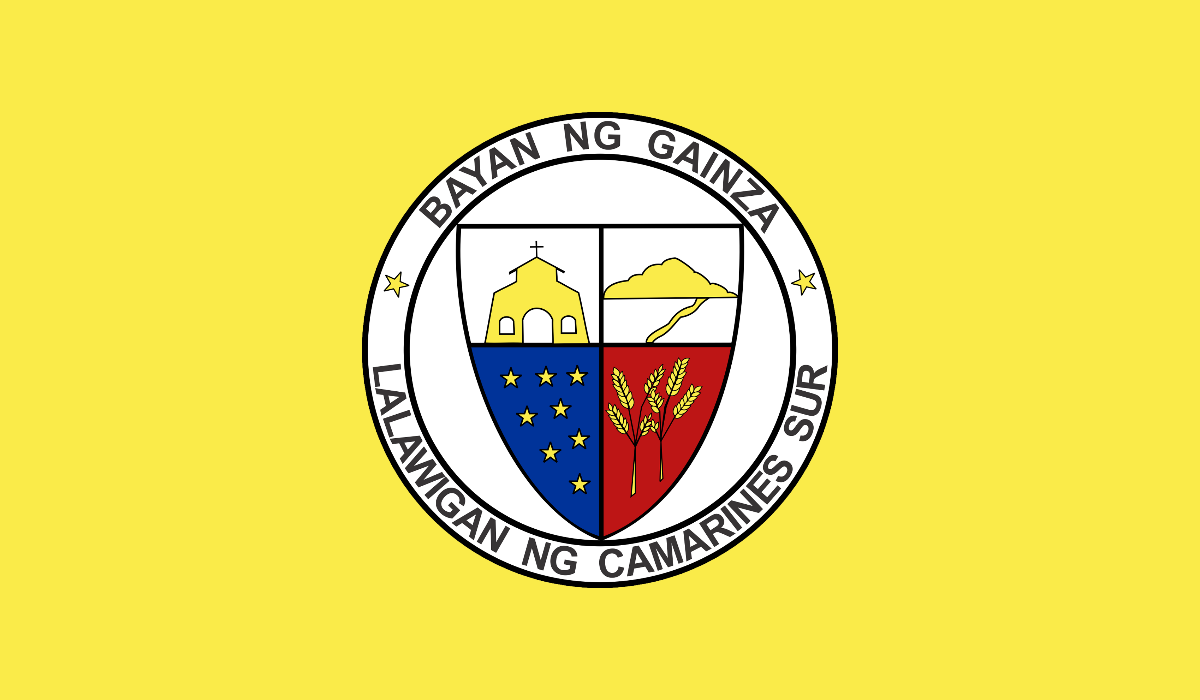
- Flag Seal
- Anthem: Himno ng Bayan
- Map of Camarines Sur with Gainza highlighted
- Interactive map of Gainza
- Location within the Philippines
- Coordinates: 13°37′00″N 123°08′29″E
- Country: Philippines
- Region: Bicol Region
- Province: Camarines Sur
- District: 2nd district
- Founded: 1578 (As a visita of Nueva Caceres), 1866 (As an independent town), 1902 (Annexed again to Nueva Caceres), 1918 (As a municipality)
- Barangays: 8 (see Barangays)

Government
  - Type: Sangguniang Bayan
  - Mayor: Glenn Romeo M. Gontang
  - Vice Mayor: Jose A. Teodoro Jr
  - Representative: Vincenzo Renato Luis Reyes Villafuerte
  - Municipal Council: Members: Moises S. San Buenaventura; Jose A. Teodoro Jr.; Reynelson A. Tranquilino; Noel C. Surbano; Romeo S. Saludes; Jojit C. Valenzuela; Emerson B. Paraiso; Cipriano D. Francisco Jr.
  - Electorate: 9,601 voters (2025)

Area
  - Total: 14.75 km^{2} (5.70 sq mi)
- Elevation: 3.0 m (9.8 ft)
- Highest elevation: 27 m (89 ft)
- Lowest elevation: −4 m (−13 ft)

Population (2024 census)
  - Total: 11,652
  - Density: 790.0/km^{2} (2,046/sq mi)
  - Households: 2,468

Economy
  - Income class: 5th municipal income class
  - Poverty incidence: 26.6% (2023)
  - Revenue: ₱ 84.24 million (2024)
  - Assets: ₱ 174.6 million (2024)
  - Expenditure: ₱ 80.92 million (2024)
  - Liabilities: ₱ 21.16 million (2024)

Service provider
  - Electricity: Camarines Sur 1 Electric Cooperative (CASURECO 1)
- Time zone: UTC+8 (PST)
- ZIP code: 4412
- PSGC: 0501713000
- IDD : area code: +63 (0)54
- Native languages: Central Bikol; Tagalog
- Website: gainza.gov.ph

Gainza, officially the Municipality of Gainza (Central Bikol: Banwaan kan Gainza; Tagalog: Bayan ng Gainza), is a municipality in the province of Camarines Sur, Philippines. According to the 2024 census, it has a population of 11,652 people, making it the least populated municipality in the province.

It is one of the oldest municipalities in the province. The town is known for its strong cultural traditions, classic buildings, and well-loved local food.

== Etymology ==
The town was first known as Sto. Domingo, named after St. Dominic of Guzman. It received its ecclesiastical charter on December 10, 1863 from Bishop Francisco Gainza of Nueva Caceres. The town was later renamed Gainza in his honor.

== History ==
The town is not a young municipality neither it can be counted among the ancient towns and cities in the Bicol Region. However, its origin is as old as “Ciudad de Caceres” – Naga City today. The municipality was formerly a barrio of Ciudad de Caceres founded by Captain Pedro de Chavez.

The barrio of Ciudad de Caceres was called Sto. Domingo, after its patron saint, Sto. Domingo de Guzman. Because the natives of this farming and fishing village had progressively clung to the fertile lowland soil and fish- rich meandering rivers and creeks in the central part of the province, its people earned the benevolence and recognition of Bishop Francisco Gainza, O.P. of Nueva Caceres. On December 10, 1863, the Bishop gave the village of Sto. Domingo its Ecclesiastical Charter as a municipality. The feast of the parish patron saint, St. Dominic of Guzman is celebrated annually on 8 August.

It was named after the late bishop of Nueva Caceres, Francisco Gainza of the Dominican Order. He selected the barrio Sto. Domingo for the construction of a canal or passageway originally planned by two Franciscan Friars and by Governor Norzagaray as early as the first half of the 17th Century.

The canal was to serve two purposes: one to connect the river of Naga to the sea of Pasacao which would shorten the route from Naga City to Manila avoiding the treacherous San Bernardino Strait, and the other is to serve as another outlet for the flood waters of the lower plains of the province.

If the Bicol River Basin Development Program had pushed through the building of the canal, the flooding of towns along the Bicol River could have been avoided. The death of the bishop overcame the ambitious project shortly after the work begun. This canal was called “Via Gainza” in honor of the courageous builder in whose name the town of Gainza was named. This canal is still discernible at present, and it is called in the place “napuhong salog” (abandoned canal). Napuhong salog starts in barangay Loob in Gainza and ends in barangay Taban,Minalabac. The canal is a perfect straight line.

His death also meant the end of its development. For political reasons (there were few voters) the town had been neglected in the matter of road building. After three centuries, a good road connecting this town to Naga City was never developed.

== Geography ==
=== Barangays ===
Gainza, a municipality in the Philippines, is politically composed of eight (8) barangays. Each barangay comprises smaller administrative units known as puroks, and some include sitios. The barangays are:

- Cagbunga
- Dahilig
- Loob
- Malbong
- Namuat
- Sampaloc
- District I (Poblacion), also known as San Juan
- District II (Poblacion), also known as Sto. Niño

=== Climate ===
Climate data for Gainza, Camarines Sur
Month	Jan	Feb	Mar	Apr	May	Jun	Jul	Aug	Sep	Oct	Nov	Dec	Year
Mean daily maximum °C (°F)	33 (91)	31 (88)	35 (95)	37 (99)	38 (100)	37 (99)	36 (97)	34 (93)	35 (95)	34 (93)	33 (91)	32 (90)	35 (94)
Mean daily minimum °C (°F)	27 (81)	27 (81)	29 (84)	31 (88)	32 (90)	32 (90)	30 (86)	29 (84)	30 (86)	29 (84)	28 (82)	28 (82)	29 (85)
Average precipitation mm (inches)	44.2 (1.74)	52.17 (2.05)	45.43 (1.79)	54.15 (2.13)	92.29 (3.63)	182.23 (7.17)	289.11 (11.38)	260.60 (10.26)	180.07 (7.09)	340.22 (13.39)	98.7 (3.89)	337.4 (13.28)	1,976.57 (77.8)
Average rainy days	21	22	19	19	24	26	30	29	27	29	24	29	299
Source: World Weather Online

Gainza borders Milaor to the south, Pamplona to the west, Canaman to the north, Camaligan and Naga City to the east. Gainza generally is in a plain land.

== Demographics ==
Population census of Gainza
Year	Pop.	±% p.a.
1903	2,149	—
1918	1,575	−2.05%
1939	2,461	+2.15%
1948	2,672	+0.92%
1960	5,068	+5.48%
1970	4,823	−0.49%
1975	5,931	+4.23%
1980	6,212	+0.93%
1990	7,095	+1.34%
1995	7,743	+1.65%
2000	8,412	+1.79%
2007	9,404	+1.55%
2010	10,345	+3.53%
2015	11,262	+1.63%
2020	11,584	+0.60%
2024	11,652	+0.14%
Source: Philippine Statistics Authority

In the 2024 census, the population of Gainza was 11,652 people, with a density of 790 inhabitants per square kilometre or 2,000 inhabitants per square mile.

== Economy ==
Poverty incidence of Gainza (%)

Source: Philippine Statistics Authority

Majority of the land is devoted to rice, vegetables and other root crops.

Agricultural Sector:

▪ Rice (44%)

▪ Carrots (3%)

▪ Cabbages (25%)

▪ Root crops (28%)

Urban areas have small businesses and also fishing like rural areas do.

Gainza was formerly included in the Metro Naga area before the designation was discontinued in 2017.

== Infrastructure ==
Construction is currently underway for a new road and bridge connecting Gainza to its nearby municipality. At an earlier stage, access to more remote barangays was limited to either boats or a suspension bridge. However, significant progress has been made with the completion of three bridges: (1) the Brgy Loob-Malbong Bridge, (2) the Sampaloc Bridge, and (3) the Gainza-Patong Bridge, Pamplona. These bridges, along with a connecting road linking to its nearby municipality will improve transportation options, making it easier for residents and travelers to move between these areas. This development is expected to greatly enhance local connectivity and support regional growth.

== Healthcare ==
- Rural Health Center 1 (Cagbunga)
- Rural Health Center 2 (Sampaloc)
- Rural Health Center 3 (Malbong)

== Education ==
The Milaor-Gainza Schools District Office governs all educational institutions within the municipality. It oversees the management and operations of all private and public, from primary to secondary schools.

=== Primary and elementary schools ===
- Cagbunga Elementary School
- Dahilig Elementary School
- Gainza Central School
- Loob Elementary School
- Malbong Elementary School
- Sampaloc Elementary School

=== Secondary school ===
- Gainza National High School

== Gallery ==
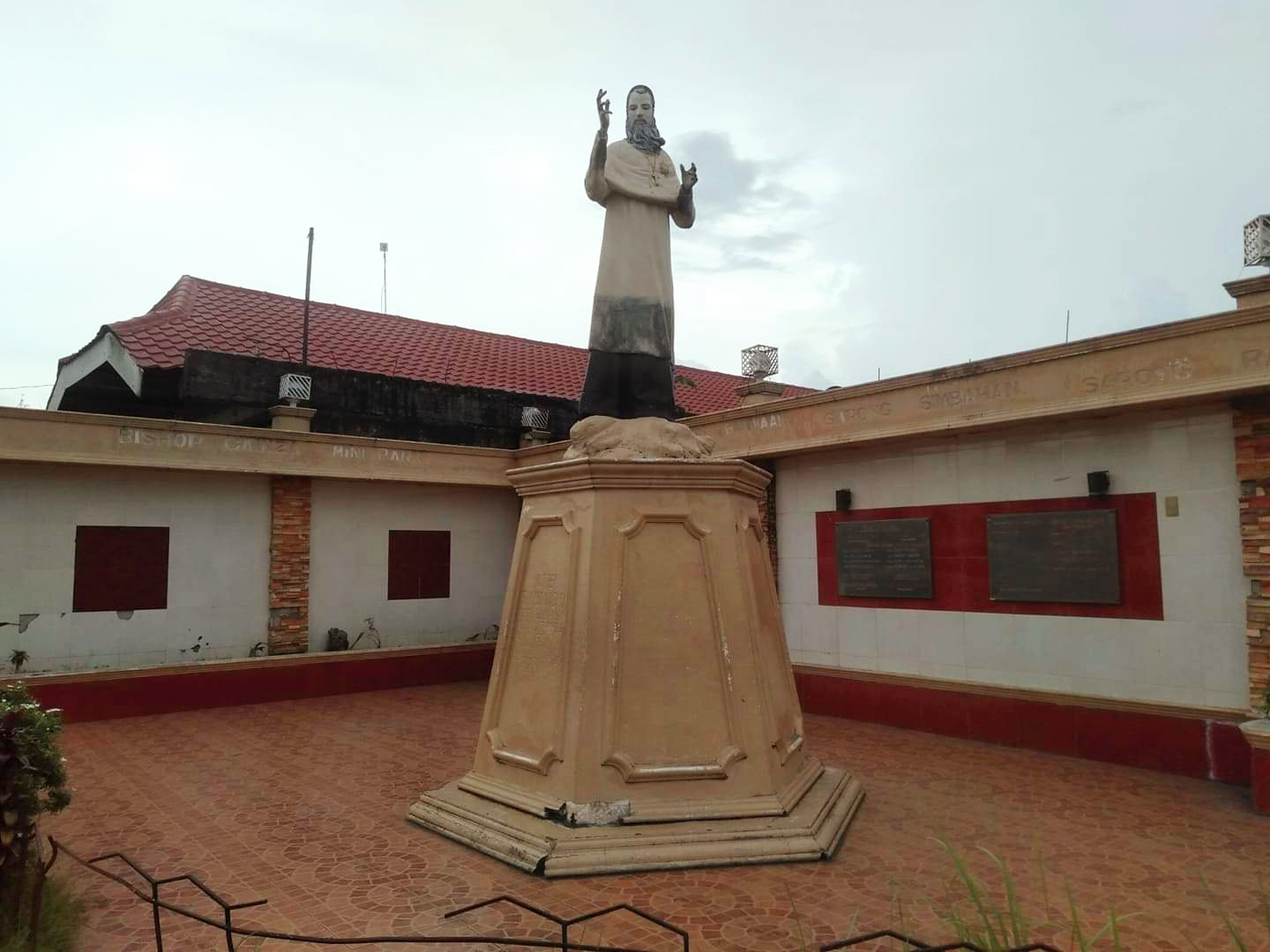
Bishop Francisco Gainza Monument

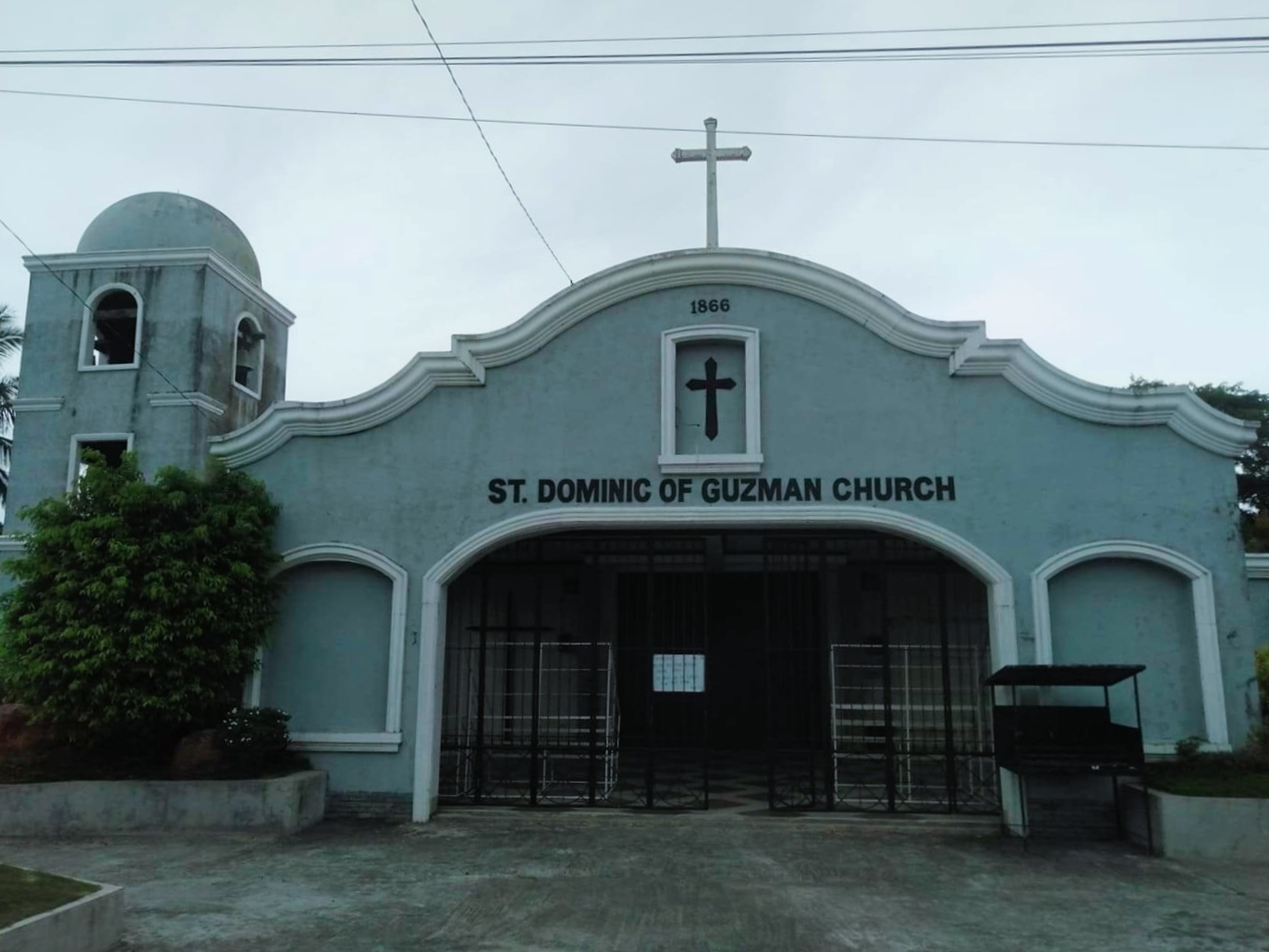
St. Dominic of Guzman Parish Church
