= Minalabac =

Municipality in Camarines Sur, Philippines

- Municipality
- Municipality of Minalabac
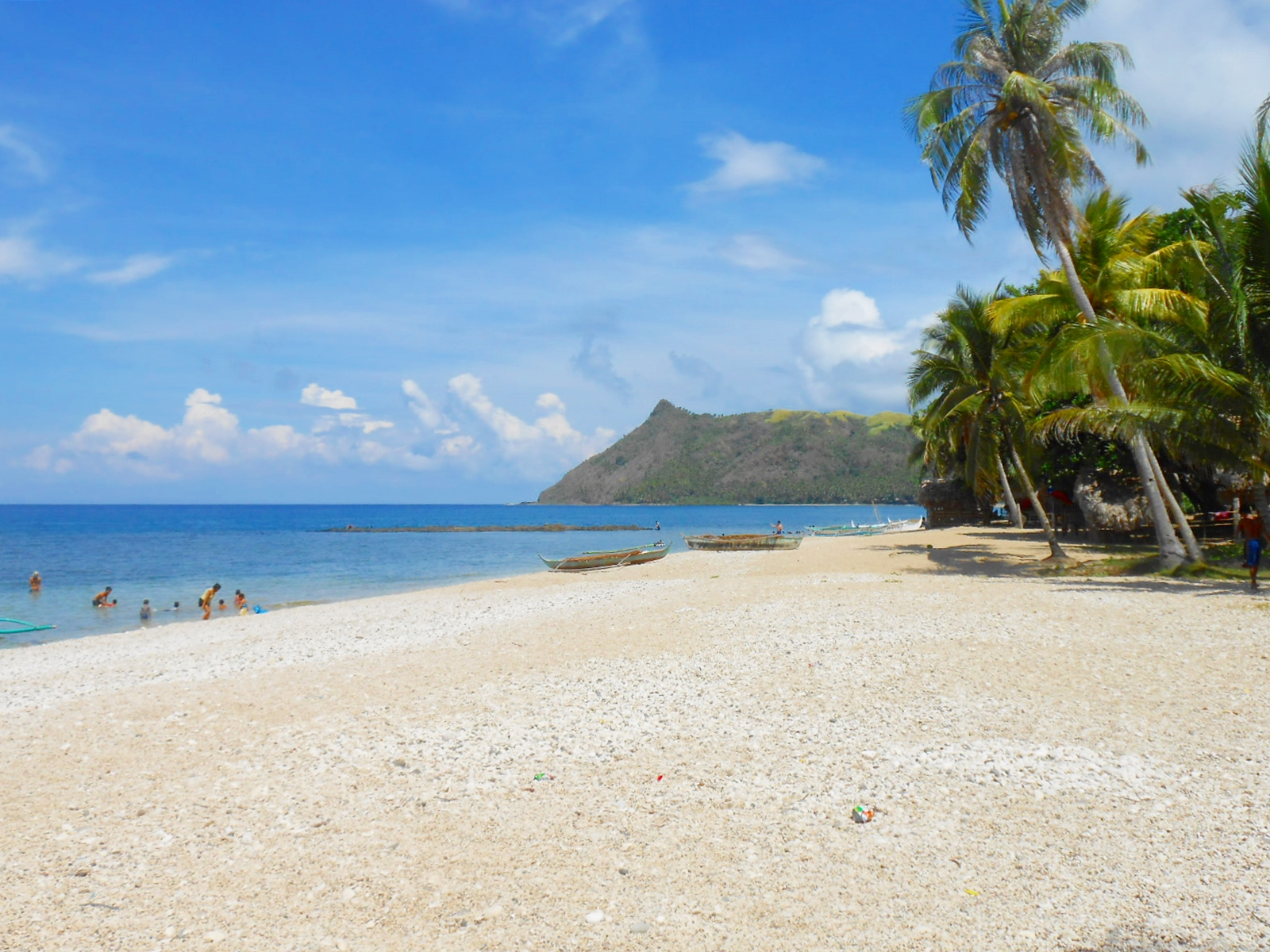
- White pebble beach in Bagolatao

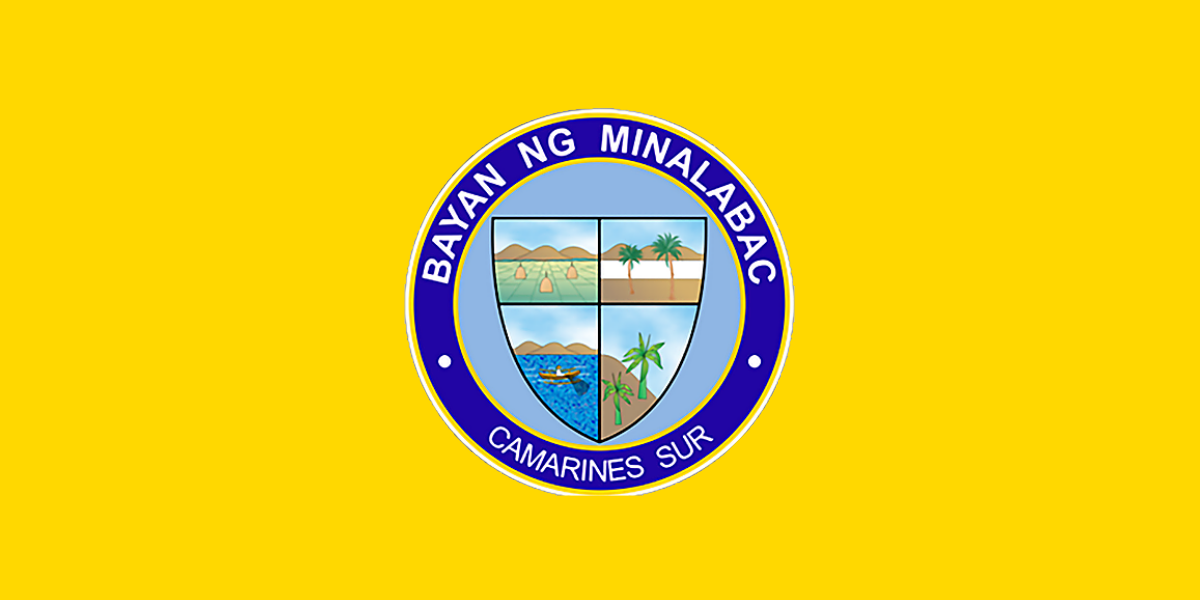
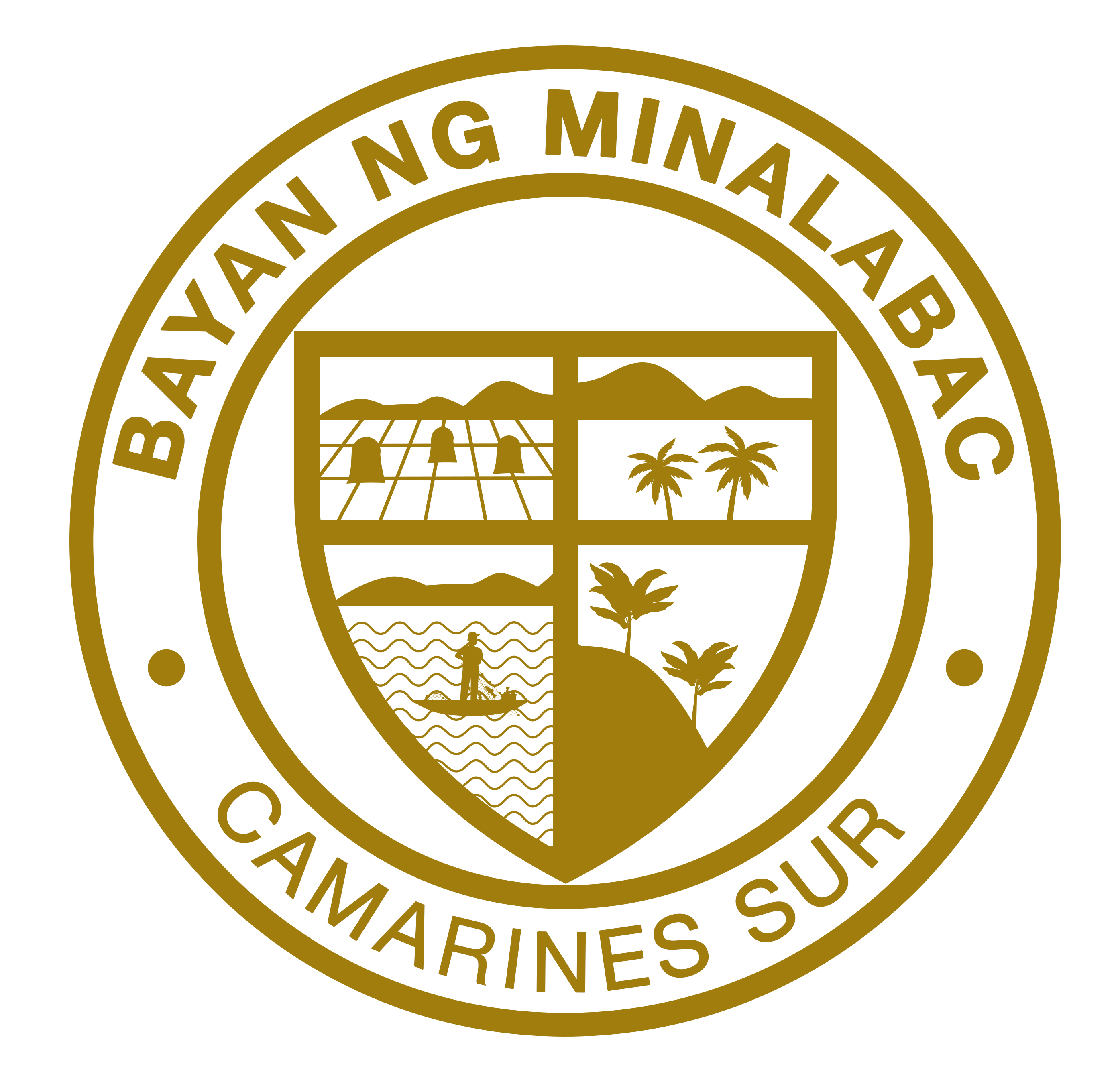
- Flag Seal

- Map of Camarines Sur with Minalabac highlighted
- Interactive map of Minalabac
- Location within the Philippines
- Coordinates: 13°34′01″N 123°10′52″E
- Country: Philippines
- Region: Bicol Region
- Province: Camarines Sur
- District: 2nd district
- Barangays: 25 (see Barangays)

Government
  - Type: Sangguniang Bayan
  - Mayor: James Colin D. Lizardo
  - Vice Mayor: Noe G. Lavandero
  - Representative: Vincenzo Renato Luigi R. Villafuerte
  - Municipal Council: Members: Rolito U. Orosco; Renato A. Barcinas; Peddy B. Benamira; Miguel S. Bersabe; Nilo N. Cadores; Edilberto C. Platon Jr.; Crisanto P. Bersabe; Lea B. Betito
  - Electorate: 33,759 voters (2025)

Area
  - Total: 126.10 km^{2} (48.69 sq mi)
- Elevation: 7.0 m (23.0 ft)
- Highest elevation: 518 m (1,699 ft)
- Lowest elevation: −3 m (−9.8 ft)

Population (2024 census)
  - Total: 51,841
  - Density: 411.11/km^{2} (1,064.8/sq mi)
  - Households: 11,622

Economy
  - Income class: 3rd municipal income class, 1st municipal income class
  - Poverty incidence: 31.2% (2023)
  - Revenue: ₱ 217.3 million (2024)
  - Assets: ₱ 911.4 million (2024)
  - Expenditure: ₱ 192.8 million (2024)
  - Liabilities: ₱ 167.1 million (2024)

Service provider
  - Electricity: Camarines Sur 2 Electric Cooperative (CASURECO 2)
- Time zone: UTC+8 (PST)
- ZIP code: 4414
- PSGC: 0501722000
- IDD : area code: +63 (0)54
- Native languages: Central Bikol; Tagalog
- Website: minalabac.gov.ph

Minalabac, officially the Municipality of Minalabac (Central Bikol: Banwaan kan Minalabac, Tagalog: Bayan ng Minalabac), is a First Class (as of 2025) municipality in the province of Camarines Sur, Philippines. According to the 2024 census, it has a population of 51,841 people.

== Etymology ==
The name Minalabac is linked to the early Spanish term “Minalagua,” which was said to mean “mine of water.” Early Spanish settlers reportedly used this name to describe the area, noting its water sources. Over time, the name evolved into its present form.

== History ==
Minalabac traces its roots to the late 1580s. The first settlement was in Sitio Inguinan. Strong typhoons pushed residents to move the town about three kilometers to its present site.

The town became organized under the Municipal Code on January 31, 1901.

== Geography ==
=== Barangays ===
Minalabac is politically subdivided into 25 barangays. Each barangay consists of puroks and some have sitios.

Barangay Name	Philippine Standard Geographic Codes Code	Urban/Rural	Population (2020 Census)
Antipolo	051722001	Urban	6,865
Bagolatao	051722002	Rural	1,323
Bagongbong	051722003	Rural	995
Baliuag Nuevo	051722004	Rural	1,625
Baliuag Viejo	051722005	Rural	3,270
Catanusan	051722006	Rural	1,463
Del Carmen-Del Rosario (Pob)	051722007	Rural	2,440
Del Socorro	051722008	Rural	1,365
Hamoraon	051722009	Rural	1,798
Hobo	051722010	Rural	3,966
Irayang Solong	051722011	Rural	1,885
Magadap	051722012	Rural	1,300
Malitbog	051722013	Rural	1,330
Manapao	051722014	Rural	2,485
Mataoroc	051722015	Rural	2,610
Sagrada (Sagrada Familia)	051722016	Rural	2,687
Salingogon	051722017	Rural	2,258
San Antonio (Pob)	051722018	Rural	1,017
San Felipe-Santiago (Pob)	051722019	Rural	852
San Francisco (Pob)	051722020	Rural	574
San Jose	051722021	Rural	1,969
San Juan-San Lorenzo (Pob)	051722022	Rural	1,541
Taban	051722023	Rural	1,283
Tariric	051722024	Rural	3,748
Timbang	051722025	Rural	1,192

=== Climate ===
Climate data for Minalabac, Camarines Sur
Month	Jan	Feb	Mar	Apr	May	Jun	Jul	Aug	Sep	Oct	Nov	Dec	Year
Mean daily maximum °C (°F)	33 (91)	32 (90)	35 (95)	37 (99)	38 (100)	36 (97)	35 (95)	33 (91)	35 (95)	34 (93)	33 (91)	32 (90)	34 (94)
Mean daily minimum °C (°F)	27 (81)	27 (81)	29 (84)	31 (88)	32 (90)	32 (90)	31 (88)	29 (84)	30 (86)	29 (84)	28 (82)	28 (82)	29 (85)
Average precipitation mm (inches)	36.66 (1.44)	58.6 (2.31)	37.91 (1.49)	76.31 (3.00)	98.34 (3.87)	151.99 (5.98)	288.39 (11.35)	291.41 (11.47)	186.77 (7.35)	363.21 (14.30)	97.5 (3.84)	292.1 (11.50)	1,979.19 (77.9)
Average rainy days	18	23	16	17	25	28	31	26	27	29	24	29	293
Source: World Weather Online

== Demographics ==
Population census of Minalabac

Year	Pop.	±% p.a.
1903	3,993	—
1918	4,094	+0.17%
1939	9,620	+4.15%
1948	11,984	+2.47%
1960	19,654	+4.21%
1970	23,373	+1.75%
1975	27,089	+3.00%
1980	30,336	+2.29%

Year	Pop.	±% p.a.
1990	35,922	+1.70%
1995	37,574	+0.85%
2000	41,734	+2.28%
2007	43,957	+0.72%
2010	48,162	+3.38%
2015	52,390	+1.62%
2020	53,981	+0.63%
2024	51,841	−0.97%

Source: Philippine Statistics Authority

In the 2024 census, the population of Minalabac was 51,841 people, with a density of 410 inhabitants per square kilometre or 1,100 inhabitants per square mile.

== Economy ==
Poverty incidence of Minalabac (%)

Source: Philippine Statistics Authority

Minalabac is classified as a municipality. Minalabac has the same economy as Libmanan, Cabusao, San Fernando, Milaor, Ocampo, Nabua, and Calabanga because of fishing in coastal barangays near Ragay Gulf particularly Salingogon, and Bagolatao. Minalabac has several beach resorts that also boosts the economy of the town. Majority of the land is devoted to rice, vegetables and other root crops.

It was formerly included in the Metro Naga area before the designation was discontinued in 2017.

== Transportation ==
Jeepneys are used for transportation from Naga City to Minalabac (Vice Versa), and from LCC Terminal in Sabang, Naga City to the market of Minalabac. It is the main transportation for public use.

== Infrastructures ==
The town has a couple of provincial roads. The main road in the town is the Milaor-Minalabac-Pili road and the other roads either goes to the Poblacion, other barangays, to Rinconada district, or even Albay.

== Tourism ==
Two main summer beach destinations include the pebble beach in Bagolatao and sand beach in Hamoraon. The growing number of resorts offers amenities such as cottages, videoke, rest house, etc.

== Government ==
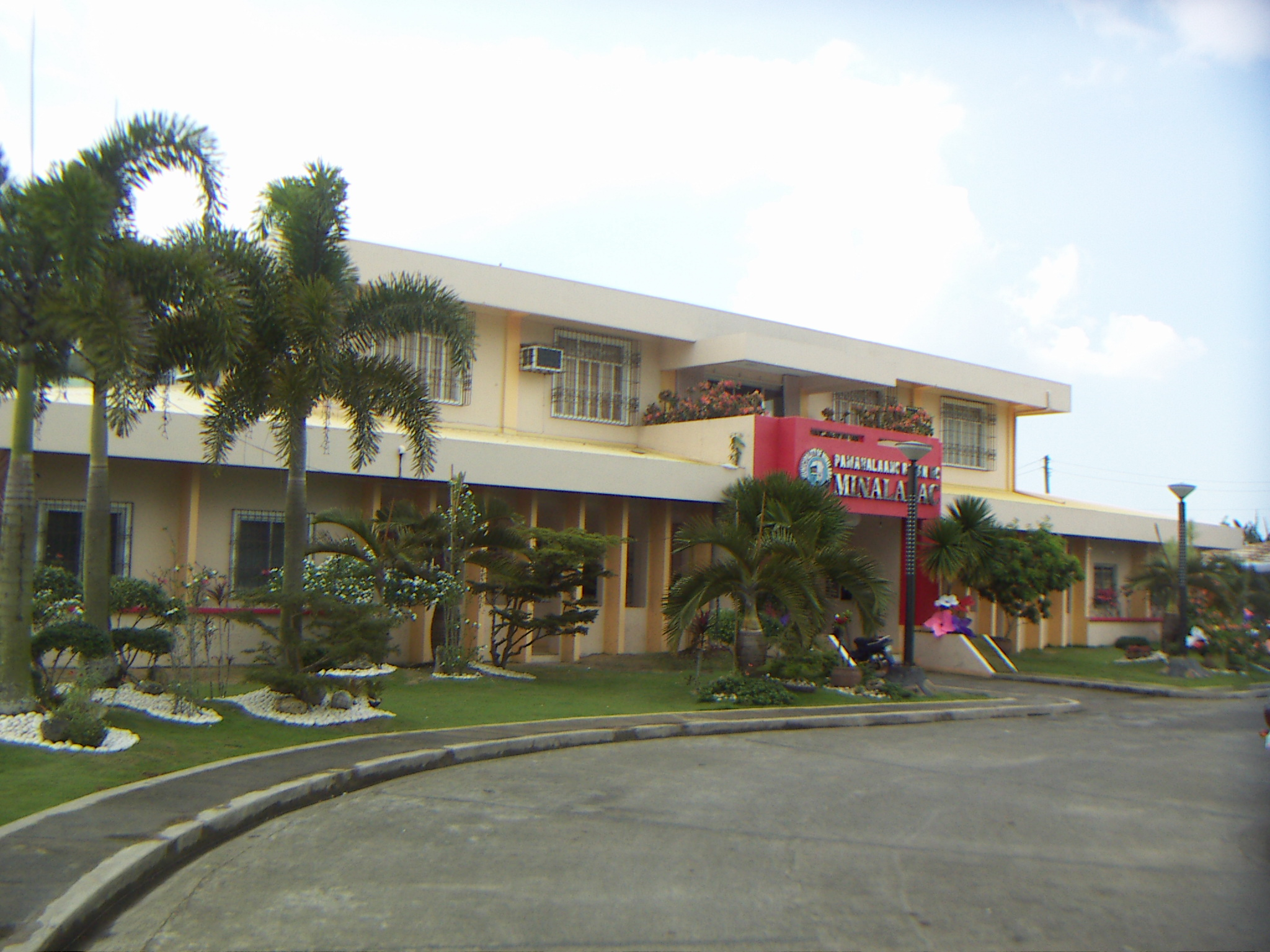
Minalabac Municipal Hall

=== Elected officials ===
Members of the Minalabac Municipal Council (2025-2028)
Position	Name	Party
District Representative (2nd Legislative District, Camarines Sur)	Vincenzo Renato Luigi R. Villafuerte	NUP
Mayor	James Colin D. Lizardo	NUP
Vice Mayor	Noe G. Lavandero	NUP
Councilors	Rolito U. Orosco	NUP
Councilors	Renato A. Barcinas	NUP
Councilors	Peddy B. Benamira	NUP
Councilors	Miguel S. Bersabe	NUP
Councilors	Nilo N. Cadores	NUP
Councilors	Edilberto C. Platon Jr.	NUP
Councilors	Crisanto P. Bersabe	NUP
Councilors	Lea B. Betito	NUP

== Education ==
The Minalabac Schools District Office governs all educational institutions within the municipality. It oversees the management and operations of all private and public, from primary to secondary schools.

=== Primary and elementary schools ===
- Antipolo Elementary School
- Bagolatao Elementary School
- Bagongbong Elementary School
- Baliuag Nuevo Elementary School
- Baliuag Viejo Elementary School
- Bingcay Elementary School
- Catanusan Elementary School
- Del Socorro Elementary School
- Hamoraon Elementary School
- Hobo Elementary School
- Irayang Solong Elementary School
- Magadap Elementary School
- Malitbog Elementary School
- Manapao Elementary School
- Mataoroc Elementary School
- Minalabac Central School
- Prince Thad Montessori School
- Sagrada Familia Elementary School
- Salingogon Elementary School
- San Antonio Elementary School
- San Jose Elementary School (Main)
- San Jose Primary School (Annex)
- Taban Elementary School
- Tariric Elementary School
- Timbang Elementary School
- Upper Anayan Primary School

=== Secondary schools ===
- Antipolo National High School
- Bagolatao National High School
- Hobo National High School
- Minalabac National High School
- Pangan High School Foundation
- Sagrada Familia High School
- Tariric Agro-Industrial High School
- Villamayor National High School
