= Universidad de Sta. Isabel de Naga =

Roman Catholic university in Naga, Camarines Sur, Philippines

Universidad de Sta. Isabel de Naga, Inc.
- Pamantasan ng Sta Isabel sa Naga, Inc. (Filipino) Unibersidad nin Sta. Isabel kan Naga, Inc. (Central Bikol)
- Seal
- Former names: Escuela-Colegio Diocesano de Sta. Isabel (Apr. 12, 1868); Escuela Normal de Maestras (Jan. 11, 1872); Colegio de Sta. Isabel (Sep. 18, 1875); Universidad de Sta. Isabel (Nov. 17, 2001); Universidad de Sta. Isabel de Naga, Inc. (2023)
- Motto in English: We Move Forward
- Type: Private Catholic research non-profit coeducational basic and higher education institution
- Established: April 12, 1868 (158 years and 174 days)
- Founders: Rt. Rev. Francisco Gainza, O.P., Bishop of Caceres
- Religious affiliation: Roman Catholic (Daughters of Charity)
- Academic affiliations: ACUP, ASEACCU, CEAP, PAASCU
- President: Lourdes Albis
- Principal: Dr. Luisa P. Vale, Ph.D (basic education)
- Location: Elias Angeles St., Bagumbayan Sur, Naga City, Camarines Sur, Philippines; 13°37′44″N 123°11′19″E
- Campus: Urban; Main campus (Bagumbayan Sur, Naga); Annex campus (Panganiban Drive, Naga); Satellite campus (Pili, Camarines Sur)
- Alma mater song: "The University Hymn"'
- Patron saint: Elizabeth of Hungary
- Colors: Yellow Green
- Sporting affiliations: BUCAL
- Mascot: Falcons
- Website: www.usi.edu.ph
- Location in Luzon Location in the Philippines

Universidad de Sta. Isabel de Naga, Inc., ([juːnɪvɚˈsɪdæd deɪ ˈsænta ˌɪˈseɪbɛl deɪ ˈnɑːgə ˌɪŋk], en) (English: University of St. Isabel in Naga, Inc.) (USI, formerly Colegio de Sta. Isabel) is a private Catholic university run by the Sisters of Charity of Saint Vincent De Paul in Naga, Camarines Sur, Philippines. It was founded by the Rt Rev. Francisco Gainza, O.P., Bishop of Caceres, in 1868 as the first normal school for women in Asia, named in honor of the university's patron, St. Isabel, Queen of Hungary.

Queen Isabella II's Royal Decree in 1867 opened Escuela-Colegio de Sta. Isabel (ESCI) in 1868 under the Diocese of Cáceres of Rt Rev. Francisco Gainza's episcopate in Nueva Cáceres. ECSI introduced the Escuela Normal de Maestra in 1872, founding the first normal school for women in Asia, named in honor of the university's patron, St. Isabel, Queen of Hungary. Three years later, ESCI was renamed to Colegio de Sta. Isabel (CSI). In 1898, it housed the interim government for Elias Angeles' regional rebellion. Americanized with secular Thomasite instruction in 1901, the colonial-era curriculum was gradually diluted yet CSI retained its primary Vincentian doctrines. During World War II, CSI became a temporary co-educational facility under a Greater East Asia Co-Prosperity Sphere-based syllabus, offering education to Ateneo de Naga pupils when their campus was requisitioned by the Japanese from 1940 to 1941, subsequently transferring all classes to the convent of the Cathedral and the Archdiocesian Seminary throughout the duration of the war. In 1968, CSI introduced its Graduate School. CSI was granted university status by virtue of the Higher Education Act of 1994 in 2001, conferred a year after in 2002, and is now officially referred to as Universidad de Sta. Isabel de Naga, Inc. (USI).

The university offers elementary and secondary education through the Basic Education Department (USI-BED), a Higher Education Department (USI-HED), and Graduate School. The campus is a leading institution in implementing the St. Louise de Marillac Educational System (SLMES) worldwide across Vincentian institutions.

In accordance to the Enhanced Basic Education Act of 2013, otherwise known as the "K-12 Basic Education Program" in conjunction with the "SHS Academic Track, Technical-Vocational Livelihood", USI-BED combines both elementary and secondary education under a single departmental faculty and student governing body, the Student Central Council (SCC), and a collection of classrooms in the St. Louise de Marillac Building (SLM Bldg.) and St. Vincent de Paul Building (SVP Bldg.). USI-BED is composed of Preschool, Elementary, and high schools separated into both Junior High School with a Night High School Program and Senior High School curricula.

== History ==
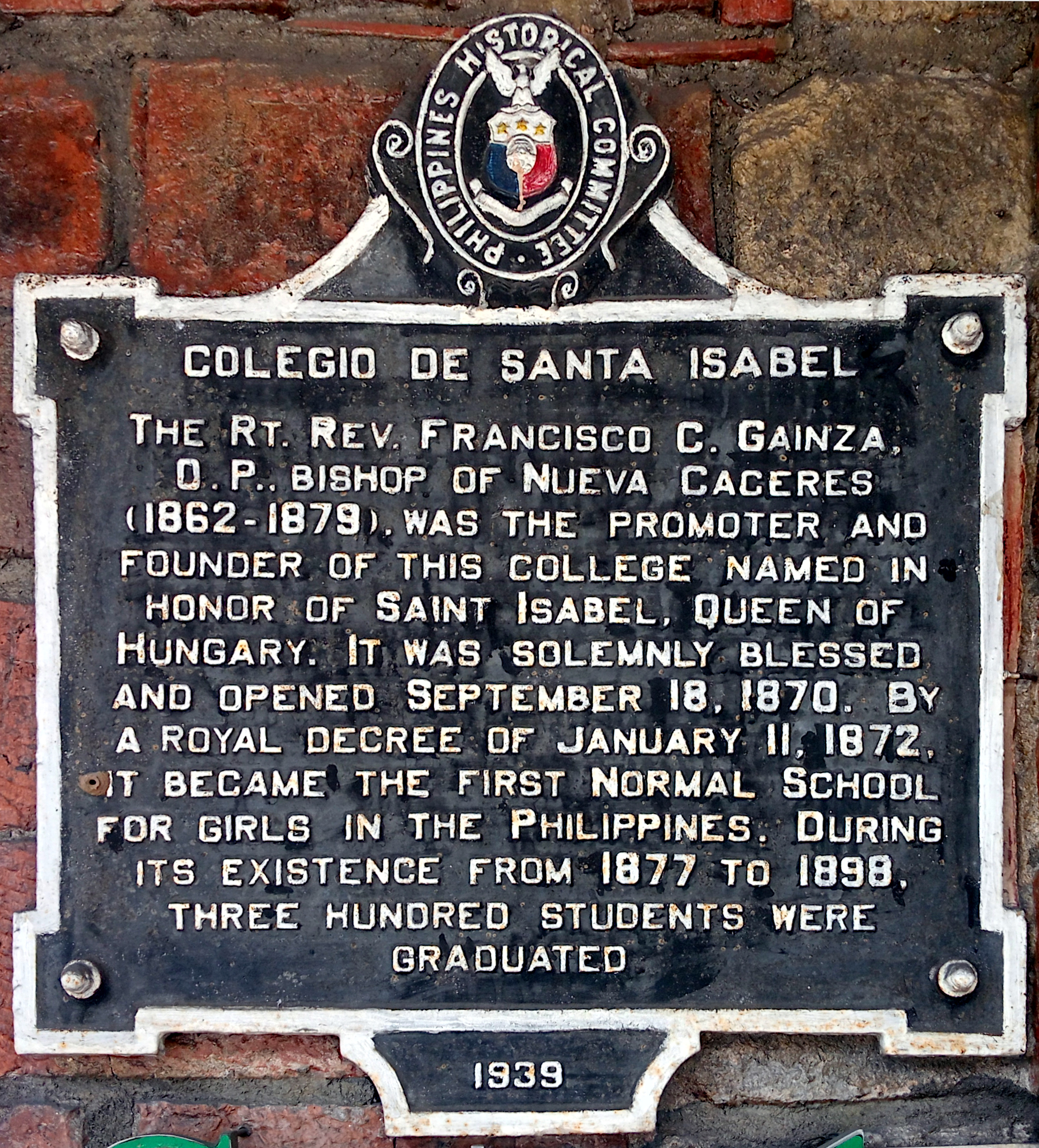
National historical marker installed in 1939

=== Opening of the Escuela-Colegio de Sta. Isabel ===
==== Proposals of Rev. Francisco Gainza ====
In February 1863, during Rev. Francisco Gainza's consecration to the episcopated by Abp. Gregorio Meliton, Archdiocese of Manila, he planned reformations for the Diocese of Caceres with Fr. Gregorio Velasco, C.M. in the Las Islas Filipinas: the establishment of a colegio-beaterio ran by the Sisters of Charity of St. Vincent de Paul and the redirection of the Seminario Conciliar. Velasco described Gainza's endeavors as a "daring pursuit" (era una empreza atrevida).

==== Establishment of a colegio-beaterio in Nueva Cáceres ====
Upon Gainza's initialization of his diocesian reformations since his arrival in Nueva Cáceres on 19 March 1863, he worked toward the colegio-beaterio by first erecting an edifice across the Cathedral and near the Episcopal Palace. On 8 October 1866, Gainza briefed the Ministry of Overseas Colonies, Alejandro de Castro, of his proposals for a colegio-beaterio in Nueva Cáceres. In his letter, he stressed the absence of the diocese's primary normal school for girls to wit:

"Another diocesan establishment is missing, to whose classes all the girls of this city and immediate suburbs go to receive an education in harmony with the conditions of their sex, and with the high mission of women in the Islands, so that returning to their homes, they can carry the seeds of Christianly advanced civilization, for the improvement of their towns and for the good of their families."

— Rev. Francisco Gainza, 6 October 1866

In the same letter, Gainza requested de Castro to lobby the authorization, both the funding for the journey and the ₱150 monthly wages of the five Provincial Visitors of the Sisters of Charity administering the school, and subsidization of personnel and supplies. At the end of the letter, Gainza proposed renaming the blank Colegio of Nueva Cáceres after Queen Isabella II and St. Elizabeth of Hungary (Santa Isabel de Hungría):

"I dare to propose to your excellency (V.E.) that the diocesan Colegio of Nueva Cáceres be named Santa Isabel, so that it will remember in the future generations the name of a Queen, who is gladly obeyed by these loyal provinces, and at the same time another Isabel, who discarded her own jewelry to bring to the new world true civilization, founded on Christianity."

— Rev. Francisco Gainza

==== Isabella II's enthusiasm with the colegio-beaterio ====
On 29 June 1867, Gainza headed for Southern Europe in Rome, for his quinquennial visit ad limina on the 18th centenary of Saint Peter, then Madrid, where he discussed with Isabella II his proposals of the colegio-beaterio. Met with resounding approval, Gainza described his meeting with the Queen:

"The warm welcome that her majesty and her august husband gave us during our stay; of the sweet satisfaction with which they heard the news of these Islands; the eager interest with which they asked interesting details, of the kind deference with which they promised us at first to accept our wishes, and the hasty kindness with which they later fulfilled it."

— Rev. Francisco Gainza, 29 June 1867

==== Royal decree from Spain ====
A royal decree from Her Majesty, dated November 5, 1867, formally authorized Gainza to construct the multidepartmental "colegio-beaterio" (all-girls school) ran by the Hijas de Caridad de Sta. Vincent de Paul (Daughters of Charity of St. Vincent de Paul) in Nueva Cáceres; it was referred to as the Escuela-Colegio de Sta. Isabel. In the decree's three provisions, it read:

"First. A primary school is created in the city of Nueva Cáceres, capital of the Diocese, and under the dedication of Santa Isabel, to which poor girls from the Diocese can attend to receive free education;

Second. Said school will be under the immediate inspection of the Reverend Bishop and the provisions of the Royal Decree of December 20, 1863;

Third. The staff of said school will be made up of six Sisters of Charity,19 with the annual salary of six hundred escudos each, assigning one thousand escudos for the maintenance of the building where the school is located, and for the replenishment of the necessary teaching materials."

— Isabella II, 5 November 1867, Royal Decree

==== Arrival of the Daughters of Charity ====
By January 1868, Gainza and the six sisters departed Madrid for Nueva Cáceres. After two months of sea travel, they arrived at Manila, where they were joined by Vincentian and Dominican monks, such as Mariano Cuartero, O.P. and Rev. Uy of the Diocese of Jaro for the rest of the excursion. On 4 April 1868, the six sisters, Francisca Sales Montoya, the first superior of the Sisters of Charity in Nueva Cáceres, Crisologa Navarro, Ignacia Ostolozas, Juana Morga, Rita Delome, Antonia Novao were welcomed by Fr. Vicente Garcia at Pasacao Beach southeast of Nueva Cáceres, resting at Pamplona for the night.

On the next day, 5 April 1868, the Sisters vacated Pasacao via Pamplona and the Bicol River then docking at Camaligan en route to Nueva Cáceres. Upon arrival, they were welcomed by Rt Rev. Francisco Gainza, O.P., Bishop of Caceres at his Episcopal Palace in the Diocese of Caceres.

==== Inauguration of the Escuela-Colegio de Sta. Isabel ====
On 12 April 1868, the Escuela-Colegio de Sta. Isabel was formally opened. During the inauguration, Rev. Francisco Gainza delivered a speech at the Mary's Garden of the present day Higher Education Department (HED) noting the Queen's complacence in the establishment of the Colegio and paid his gratitude to Her Majesty, saying:

“The erection of a Colegio, not so much for the education of the girls of the city and its neighboring towns, but for the formation of disciples among the boarding students and zealous teachers, who can spread the principles of a Christian education and of a sound and judicious enlightenment.”

— Rev. Francisco Gainza, 12 April 1868

=== Escuela-colegio education system ===
==== General policies ====
The Escuela-Colegio de Sta. Isabel, a diocesan school decreed therein, consisted of two instructions: the primary instruction and their students (colegialas), and the normal school and their teacher students (normalistas). Both were distinctly independent units with different statutes, academic policies, and curriculum.

==== General statistics ====
On the opening year of the Colegio, the school received a general total of 220 enrollees with more day than boarding students: a meager 70 boarding students from the principalia of Nueva Cáceres and Albay (internas), because of budgetary constraints at the time; and 150 day students (externas).

==== Primary school ====
===== Departmentalization =====
After the provision, the primary school had two departments: the Boarding and Day School for Girls (Colegio de Niñas Internas y Externas) and the Municipal School for Poor Girls (Escuela Municipal para Las Niñas Pobres).

===== Grade levels =====
The primary school was composed of three levels: entrada (entrance), ascenso (intermediary), and termino (final); with the curriculum enshrined in Castilian studies of Catholic doctrine. Colegialas had subjects in Spanish, its grammar, orthography, and literature; Christian Doctrine (Doctrina Cristiana); Principles of Morality; Sacred History; Arithmetic, with 19th-century concepts in integers, fractions, decimals, and measuring; Rules of Courtesy (Reglas de Urbanidad); voice lessons; women's work, such as different studies of needlework. On 4 August 1868, Fr. Gainza ratified the primary school's implementing statutes, the Estatutos; herein the provisions of the Escuela Normal de Manila's 20 December 1863 Decree were adopted.

==== Normal school ====
In the normal school, the academic year began on 1 July and ended on 15 May, on the feast of San Isidro Labrador. Comparable to Nueva Cáceres and Manila's colegio-beaterio, the normalistas studied Religion, Morals, Sacred History, Spanish, Arithmetic, Geography, History, Rules of Courtesy, and Pedagogy, with Geometry, Natural Sciences, and Music being voluntary.

=== Training for primary teachers ===
==== Gainza lobbying ====
On 14 December 1869, Gainza lobbied to Gov-Gen. Carlos María de la Torre y Navacerrada of a proposal to recruit 100 16 to 20 year-old women pensionadas (scholars) from 100 towns under his episcopate chosen by their principalia and parish priests; they were to train pedagogy for two to four years then take charge of their town's primary schools as teachers or assistants, with Gainza specifically requesting the pensionadas be shouldered by provincial funds, a fee of six pesos a month or 72 pesos a year. Notably, Gainza added:

"to provide teachers to the towns of the Diocese and to apply on a large scale to Santa Isabel the measures adopted to train teachers at the Escuela Normal de Manila"

— Fr. Francisco Gainza, 14 December 1869

On 3 January 1870, de la Torre reassured to Gainza that the secular civil government would support them financially, but did not directly acknowledge his requests; he instead requested him a draft regulation for the normal school. Because de la Torre consolidated liberal policies, his conservative successor after his abrupt departure on 4 April 1871, Rafael de Izquierdo, had repealed Gainza's curricula, stalling his proposals altogether.

On 11 January 1872, Gainza received a royal decree signed by Amadeo I to raise the Colegio to "Escuela Normal de Maestras." This was thereby made to be inaugurated solemnly on the Feast of Our Lady of Peñafrancia.

Three months after the abdication of the Spanish throne and the establishment of the First Spanish Republic, Minister of Overseas Colonies Juan Cristobal Sorni issued "Orden del Poder ejecutivo autorizando a los Cien Pueblos de la Diocesis de Nueva Cáceres Para Mandar una Joven a la Escuela de Niñas de Dicha Ciudad para que Despues Pudiera Dirigir La Escuela De Su Respectivo Pueblo," granting Gainza's proposal of authorizing his recruitment policy and its funding.

==== Ad interim training ====
Promulgated upon the "Escuela Normal de Maestras," a government decree dated 19 June 1875 approved ad interim regulations for Colegio educators in Nueva Cáceres and was duly signed by Gov-Gen. José Malcampo, then published later in Gaceta de Manila on 23 June 1875.

Principled after the catechetical teachings of the Daughters of Charity, the integration of the poor studentry with the day and/or residential studentry into one curriculum was segregated in a multidepartmental structure: the Colegio de Niñas Internas y Externas and Escuela Municipal para Las Niñas Pobres. The program of studies required the aforementioned, elementary knowledge, instruction in Spanish, and women's work such as needlework. Primary courses lasted three years, with an optional additional year for graduate studies; a ratifiable schedule was to be sent annually to the governor for approval. Resident pupils funded locally were to reach ten years, under penalty restitution.

==== Staff of Colegio ====
The normalista staff enumeration was regular, with the ethical and religious guidance of the teacher studentry notably administered by a secular priest, the moral and religious supervision by a Diocese of Caceres bishop, and secular supervision by an alcalde-mayor, the bishop, the administrator of public finances, and a board member consolidating the staff for a period of three months. Upon accomplishment of the triennal course and the general public examiniations, students were granted the Teacher's Certificate, licensure to teach in either day or residential schools, especially in Escuela-Colegio de Sta. Isabel; if not over the age of twenty-three thereof, and other rewards.

=== Late 19th century ===
On 18 September 1875, Escuela-Colegio de Sta. Isabel became the first normal school for girls in the Philippines and Southeast Asia under the name Escuela Normal de Maestras. About 100 pensioned students were inculcated into the three-year Normal School Program.

==== Convent expansions ====
Throughout the turn of the century, the nascent academe of Colegio de Sta. Isabel rapidly developed. By 1877, the Colegio celebrated the graduation of its first eleven students. By 1897, Colegio had a convent of 13 sisters and 170 scholars, and a friary of 9 fathers and 2 brothers.

==== Angeles revolt ====
In 1898, the Spanish-American War immediately paused any academic excursions in the Colegio. As far-flung revolutions started to centralize in the Tagalog portions of Luzon, a separate local revolt, staged by Guardia Civil corporals Elias Angeles and Felix Plazo, presented Nueva Caceres as an independent polity from 18–19 September.

On the morning of 19 September, while the Spanish voluntarios recaptured the Guardia Civil barracks in Tabuco, the Angeles-led rebel forces entered Colegio grounds and fortified the campus with emplacements along the facade in anticipation for a Spaniard siege.

In the afternoon, the Spaniards' resistance faltered, prompting them to negotiate with the Guardia Civil. In an account from Franciscan friar, Fr. Marcos Gomez, he describes Sr. Don Ramon Lopez and his bearer (of the white flag) approaching the campus to seek terms:

"Sr. Lopez arrived at the school where the rebels were and the latter received him with signs of sympathy, and there they made the agreement..."

— Fr. Marcos Gomez, A Friar's Account, p. 60

The Spanish provincial capitol capitulated under Angeles' forces, provisioned by the papers of unconditional surrender signed by Governor Vicente Zaldin. In the present day, Zaldin-Angeles' treaty is in exhibit at Universidad de Sta. Isabel's Museo Histórico de la Universidad de Sta. Isabel. The Colegio campus seated Angeles' interim government until the American regime came and changed everything for the 20th century.

=== American occupation in the 20th century ===
==== Thomasite arrival ====
Following the capture and surrender of Gen. Emilio Aguinaldo on 23 March 1901, D Company of the United States Army's 15th Infantry Regiment from Legaspi, Albay occupied Nueva Cáceres. The arrival of the 500 Thomasites aboard the USS Thomas, secularized the predominantly Catholic school system in Nueva Cáceres.

==== Financial troubles during early American occupation ====
The Daughters of Charity-led faculty of CSI feared the school's closure, due to both the preferential gratis of the public school system and the general pushback from the predominantly Protestant Americans of sectarian instruction. CSI still maintained a stable turnout, but the repealment of government grants and the decrease in the enrollment of paying students caused a severe financial deficit in the institution's operations. Most Rev. Jorge Barlin wrote in his report:

"There are two colleges for the education of girls. One is in this city, the other is in the town of Tayabas, which is within the diocese but quite far from the episcopal see. The first is under the charge of the Daughters of Charity, with 36 boarding pupils and 80 day scholars."

— Most Rev. Jorge Barlin

The decrease of the student body also led to a downsize of faculty. From eight Sisters, CSI limited the number of positions to just Superiora, Procuradora, Directora, and two Profesoras held respectively by the following: Josefa Gurbindo, Manuela Hernandez, Pascuala Garin, Dolores Moreras, and Teodora Ruivivar; many of whom surmised to be of Spanish descent.

In order to subsist the capital flight, the institution had to rely on community donations, enrollment fees, and entrance examinations. Despite the extreme belt-tightening, CSI still upheld its commitment to the "gratuituas," students deserving of free education. Then, in 1912, CSI registered as a "corporation" with the government via Act No. 1459, otherwise known as the "Corporation Law of the Philippines", both to legitimize its operations as an ever-enduring educational center in Bicol and to ameliorate its financial difficulties.

As the American educational system further expanded via the creation of additional pedagogical requirements such as the imposition of Anglo-American-based curriculum to majorly Spanish-trained teachers; the establishment of a national license obtained from maestras tituladas (licensed teachers); and the stratification of professional degrees to congruent areas of disciplines, such as B.S.E. graduates to High School, and Normal School graduates to Elementary; CSI's staff was formally motivated to subscribe to these policies.

On 13 June 1913, the Primary Course was formally opened as one of CSI's earliest departments recognized by the Insular Government. Then, on 30 March 1916, the Intermediate Course was subsequently inaugurated. Despite some of the students transferring to the public schools, CSI also garnered an equal amount of admissions from the former. As these departments grounded themselves into the collective academic culture of Naga, the school finally achieved a sense of financial stability.

==== 1920s and 1930s ====
===== Temporary San Francisco church service =====
In the 1920s, the San Francisco Parish, still ruined from the aftermath of the Philippine-American War, was momentarily ceded to the Daughters of Charity of CSI by the bishop Mons. Francisco Reyes, expressing their interest in spearheading its rehabilitation. The parties arrived to an agreement, but subsequent debates pertaining to its loan amortization in the event of a government default, as demanded by the bishop, caused a split between him and the Daughters of Charity, who advocated for the hospital's gratis and charitable services. In the end, Mons. Francisco Reyes retook possession of the property and thus the financial obligations of the church's reconstruction to the local authorities.

On 12 February 1924, the Sta. Isabel High School Department (SIHSD) received formal government recognition. This makes the present USI - High School Basic Education Department (USI-BED) 102-years old, the third oldest high school department among Naga's academic institutions. In 1927, the main CSI building expanded through the construction of a northern wing equipped with seven "standard-sized classrooms" and a porch, subsequently turned over to the SIHSD with the corresponding Physics and Biology laboratories.

In 1925, a primary school for boys, called the Escuelas de la Milagrosa (School of the Miraculous), was opened for boys 3 to 12 years old; students of that age bracket could be admitted into the department as externs. In the 1920s, the present-day University Garden had a children's recreational facility just for this purpose alone. From 1925 to 1933, about 1,233 boys had registered into this department.

In 1925, CSI opened its pre-school department, garnering up to 200 enrollees from eager households. This thus was recognized by the authorities on 16 May 1937.

By the 1930s, the increase in co-curricular organizations evidenced the growing student body in then CSI, with the emergence of campus sodalities such as the Children of Mary, which still exists as an active religious club in the USI-BED along with its three-stage admission process; the Apostolado de la Oracion or Apostleship of Prayer, organized as an association "to stimulate devotion to the Sacred Heart," the Batallon Infantil de la Milagrosa, formalized with its own uniforms, banners, civic ceremonies, andliturgical music lessons; and The Little Angels, intended to cultivate and maintain the Catholic faith in the younger children.

CSI also had "The Isabelina Literary Society," the primary organizer for the school's many renowned stage plays, ranging from their academic utility to literary passion, at the Salon de Actos (the predecessor to the USI Auditorium).

Home Economics Secondary Courses opened in 1932. In 1936, Music Teachers Course in Piano became widely available. Eventually, the Junior Normal Course was opened to all in 1939.

From the school years 1936–1937 to 1937–1938, an evident growth in the student body of Colegio de Sta. Isabel could be observed.

1936–1937, 1937–1938 demographic records
	1936-1937	1937-1938
Alumnas internas (Boarding students)	55	64
Externas de paga (Day students)	279	296
Graduitas (Scholar students)	250	230
Parvulitos (Nursery pupils)	110	110
Kindergarten	20	25
Formulas (Servants)	28	32
Total	756	814

=== World War II ===
==== Before occupation ====
On 12 December 1941, the Imperial Japanese 16th Division "Kimura Detachment" landed on the shores of Legazpi, signalling the start of the Second World War in Bicol. The local academic community became frantic at the prospect of an all-supreme Japanese authority intruding on the domestic life of the local campus. All the administrative functionaries, including the Colegio de Sta. Isabel, proceeded with a hastened safekeeping process.

==== Initial occupation ====
Then, on 15 December, the Japanese arrived in Naga. The Japanese immediately occupied the educational institutions around the downtown area, erecting their garrison in the nearby Ateneo de Naga campus. Upon request of The Most Rev. Pedro Paulo Santos, the male pupils from the newfound Ateneo de Naga were admitted by the Colegio. From 1942, Nippongo-based curricula imposed by the authorities superseded Anglo-American textbooks in Colegio. The Colegio campus throughout the war was subjected to severe aerial bombings from both Allied and Japanese air power, with the first instance occurring after the guerilla recapture of Naga in 1942.

==== Bombing campaigns late war ====
In May, an all-out retaliatory aerial bombing conducted by the Imperial Japanese Army Air Services (IJAAS) leveled the urban infrastructure of Naga completely. The fragile wooden edifice and structure deemed the Colegio vulnerable, as evidenced by the collapse of Colegio's roof.

Then, from October 1944 to March 1945, the United States Army Air Forces (USAAAF) conducted a devastating bombing campaign in Naga to flatten out the sporadic Japanese fortifications. In Colegio's case, a precision strike, a week before a guerilla-led liberation of Naga, desecrated the campus' edifice. After the liberation of Naga on 3 April 1945, Colegio de Sta. Isabel was recaptured by Allied forces after an intense three-day battle. During the immediate post-war period, Colegio de Sta. Isabel, subsidized by legislative proxies, rebuilt its campus rapidly.

=== Mid-to-late 20th century ===
==== 1940s ====
In 1946, the first post-liberation graduation was held with sixty students. It was also the year where the Colegio officially received the permit for the opening of the College of Education and Liberal Arts courses.

==== 1950s ====
The latter half of the century saw the Colegio expand its college and graduate level departments. In 1950, the CSI College Department introduced elementary women's education in Secondary Education levels. Then, in 1954, the Pre-Nursing Course was opened to address Nagueño's graduating their Nursing Courses at the San Juan de Dios Hospital in Pasay.

By 1955, the CSI College Department introduced elementary women's education in Elementary Education levels. In 1957, the Junior Secretarial Course sought to address young girls seeking employment, a quasi-vocational training for women's work and their Bachelor of Arts (B.A.) program, gradually introducing new courses at three-year intervals.

==== 1960s ====
In 1960, B.A. in Music Education was introduced, then B.A. in Home Economics and B.A. in Management and Information Systems in 1963. In 1968, the Graduate School was formally recognized, extending the Master of Arts in both Education and Nursing that year.

==== 1970s ====
Amid Marcos' martial law decreed by Proclamation 1081, Royal Decree issued in 1972 conferred Colegio de Sta. Isabel to issue honorifics for the faculty. In the same year, the Bachelor of Science in Nursing received full recognition.

The main campus was opened on April 12, 1868. Colegio de Sta. Isabel achieved its university status in August 2001, and was renamed Universidad de Sta. Isabel. It is still sometimes colloquially referred to as 'Colegio' across Metro Naga.

== Campuses ==
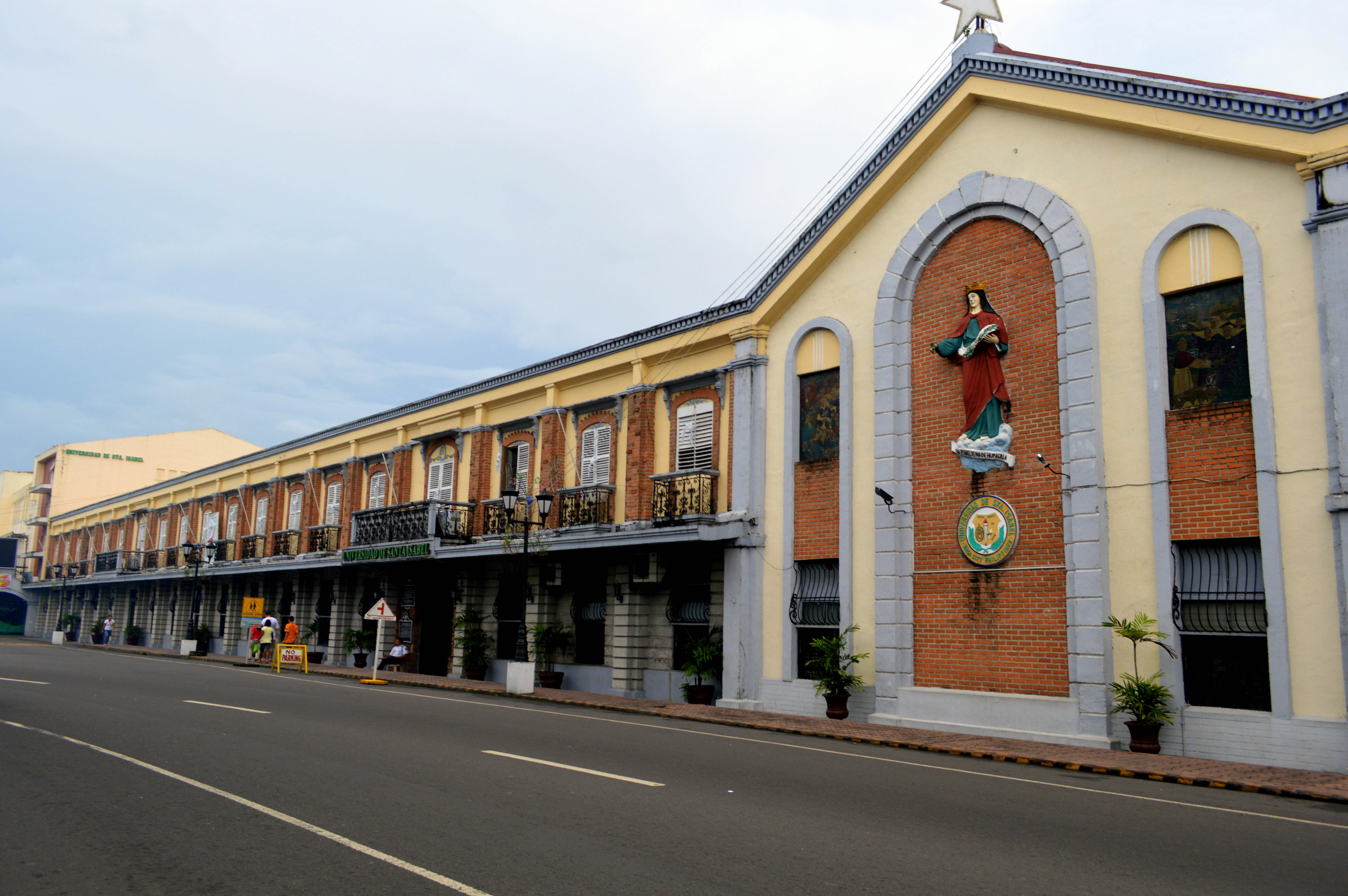
Universidad de Sta. Isabel Naga Façade

The main campus of the Universidad de Sta. Isabel is located at Elias Angeles St., Bagumbayan Sur, Naga City. The main campus manages three academic departments, the Basic Education Department, Higher Education Department, Graduate School. An annex campus is located at Panganiban Drive, Naga City and a satellite campus in Pili, Camarines Sur.

== Integrated Basic Education Department (BED) ==
The Basic Education Department, or BED, in accordance with the K-12 Basic Education Program, refers to USI's basic education institution consisting of the Elementary Department, from Grades 1 to 6; the Junior High School Department, from Grades 7 to 10; the Senior High School Department, from Grades 11 to 12.

=== Facilities ===
==== Auditorium ====
The USI Auditorium is the campus' main proscenium theater, an enclosed two-story structure equipped with sound-proofing, air-conditioning, and a seating capacity of 800 seats. It can be used for "assemblies, programs, convocations, seminars, stage plays, conventions and other school functions."

==== St. Elizabeth of Hungary Chapel ====
The St. Elizabeth of Hungary Chapel is one of the campus' principal chapels. Its exterior appears to be as a medium-sized circular structure roofed by a tall cone. The chapel has semi-circular auditorium seating arrangement in front of an altar upon a large crucifix spanning to the ceiling. Religious activities such as sponsored masses are held at this chapel.

==== Blessed Frassati Activity and Sports Center ====
The Blessed Frassati Activity and Sports Center, most commonly referred to as the "USI Frassati Gymnasium," is a two-story indoor venue structure functioning as both a student's gymnasium and an activity center for campus-related events. Its static seating is arranged on the balcony, while the first floor consists of the main activity and sports floor. The gymnasium also holds the offices for the USI Sports Development Office, USI GSS, and the USI Symphonic Band and Marching Lady Falcons.

The first floor is mostly composed of the main hall partitioned by its three paved ballcourts and enclosed by wall matting, with an adjustable truss stage deployed in the upper-center below the gym's large, wall-hung USI logo; this is the area where "ball games, PE classes, student assembles, and physical fitness exercises" are held.

The second floor contains the balcony stands, arranged in a horseshoe-type seating except for the bottom. This floor may be separated left-right relative to the stage: both sides contain eight-tiered concrete stands, the tech booth on the left, and the outdoor gymnasium in the middle, where the Vincentian Performing Arts Company and the taekwondo club often practice.

== Higher education ==
- College of Health Education
- College of Business Education
- College of Arts And Sciences, Teacher Education, Social Work and Music Education
- Graduate school

== USI as National Historical Landmark ==
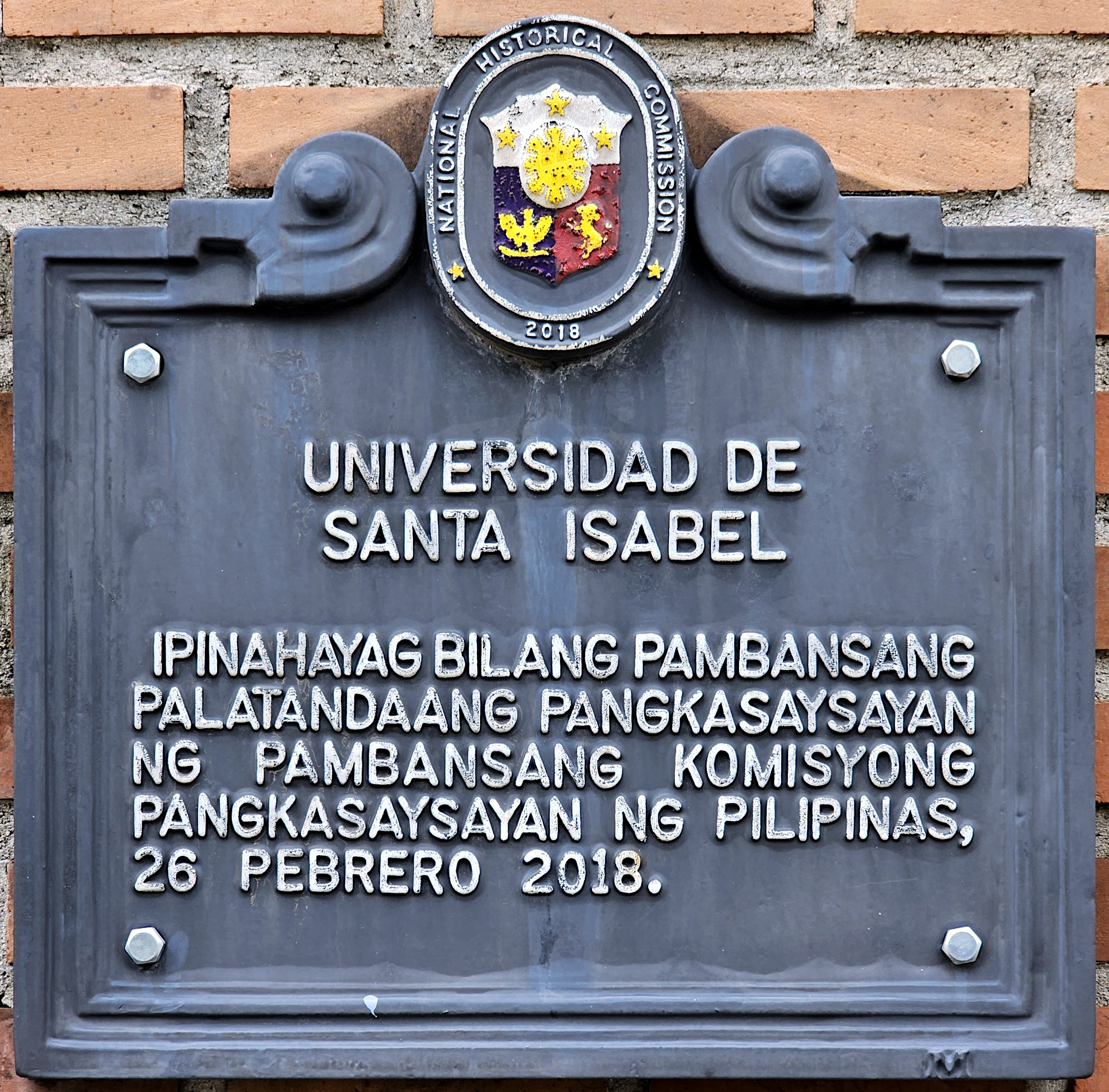
Universidad de Santa Isabel NHCP historical marker

In recognition of the important role, the academe played in Philippine history, the National Historical Commission of the Philippines (NHCP) has declared the Universidad de Sta. Isabel (USI) as a National Historical Landmark by virtue of Republic Act No. 10086. In view of this declaration, Universidad de Sta. Isabel is now also known as the Heritage and Historical University of Bicol.

At the unveiling ceremony of the historical marker, NCHP Chairman Dr. Rene R. Esclante said that "USI is important in the history of the Philippines as this is the oldest school in the country," and "the first normal school for women built during the Spanish era, where traces of the old structures and even the courses offered still exists as to this time."

== Notable people ==
=== Alumni ===
- Leni Robredo (14th Vice President of the Philippines) attended the Basic Education Department.
