= St. Anthony of Padua Parish Church (Camaligan) =

Roman Catholic church in Camarines Sur, Philippines

Saint Anthony of Padua Parish Church
- Camaligan Church
- Parokya ni San Antonio de Padua (Filipino); Iglesia Parroquial de San Antonio de Padua (Spanish)
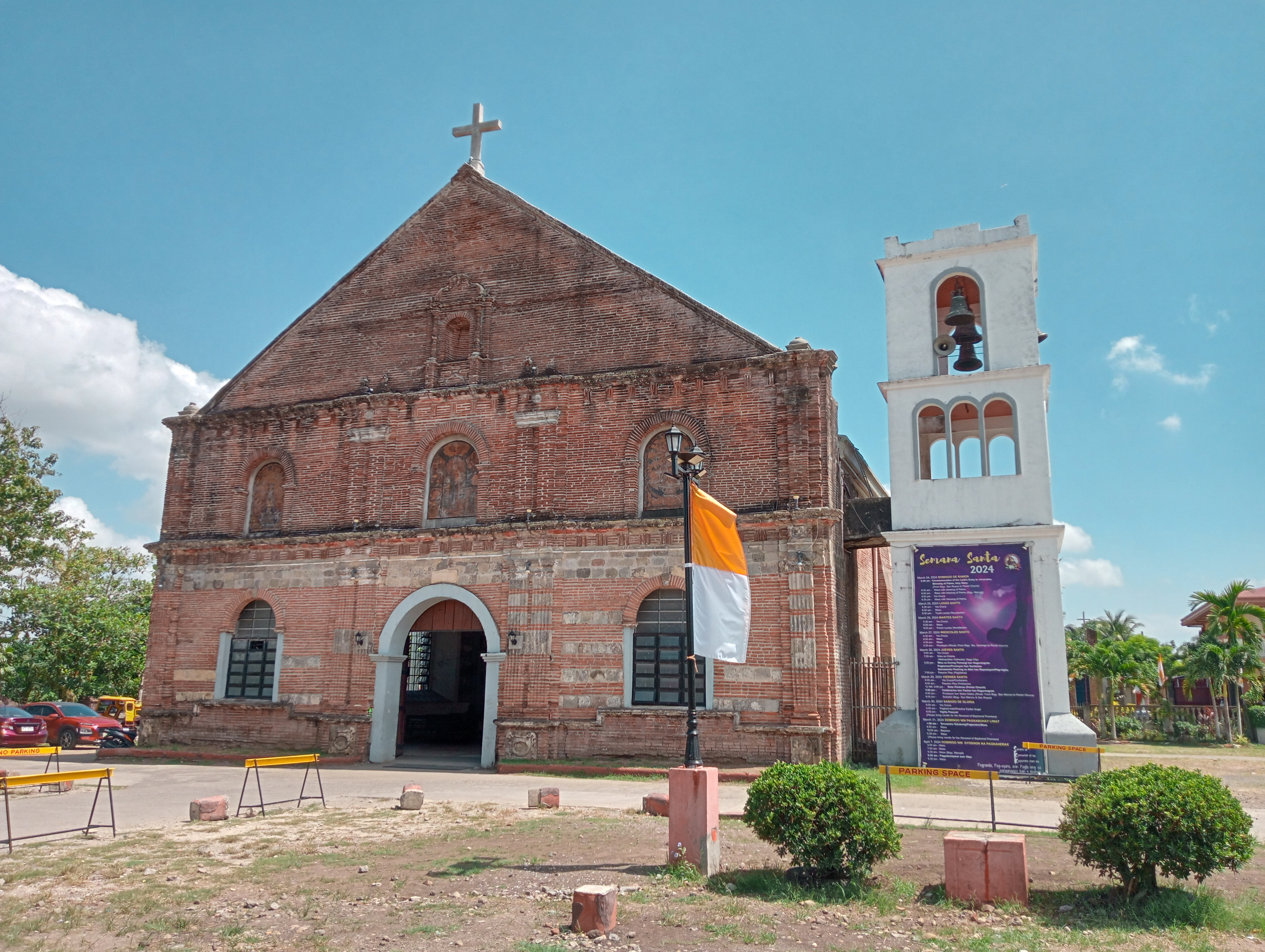
- Church façade in 2024

- Location in Luzon Location in the Philippines
- 13°37′15″N 123°10′08″E
- Location: Camaligan, Camarines Sur
- Country: Philippines
- Denomination: Roman Catholic
- Website: Facebook

History
- Status: Parish church
- Founded: 1795
- Founder: Franciscan Mission
- Dedication: St. Anthony of Padua

Architecture
- Functional status: Active
- Architectural type: Church building
- Style: Baroque
- Years built: 1856-1857
- Completed: 1857
- Closed: N/A
- Demolished: N/A

Specifications
- Materials: Stones, cement, egg whites, bricks made from ashes of freshwater clams, straws and clay

Administration
- Province: Caceres
- Archdiocese: Cáceres

Clergy
- Archbishop: Most Rev.Rex Andrew Clement Alarcon, D.D.

Saint Anthony of Padua Parish Church, originally known as Camaligan Church, is a Roman Catholic church in Camaligan, Camarines Sur, Philippines. It is one of the two parish churches of the Archdiocese of Caceres located in the town of Camaligan. The parish was established in 1795. The first church structure of Camaligan that was made of stones and woods was burnt in the year 1856. The current church architecture was only completed in 1857, a year after the original structure was burnt. The church is considered one of the oldest churches in Camarines Sur that is rich in religious and cultural history, and a popular spot for Visita Iglesia.

The church is under the Vicariate of St. John the Evangelist. As of August 2026, the parish has no parish priest and under the care of Rev Fr. Balbino B. Gumabao as Parish Administrator and Fr. Mario Arnulfo Gaite as Assistant Administrator .

== History ==
Camaligan was under the ecclesiastical and civil jurisdiction of Nueva Caceres (now Naga City) for almost two centuries, from year 1578 to 1775.

In the year 1775, the town became an independent political unit under the administration of Bishop Domingo Ollantes of Nueva Caceres. However, it was only in 1795 when Fray Rafael Benevente, was appointed parish priest by the Franciscan mission.

A church made of stones and wooden structures was built, but was burnt in the year 1856.

A year after the burning of the original church, in 1857, during the term of Fray Juan Ontiveros as parish priest, the present church structure was completed. It is said that when this church was built, the real intention of the friars was to wipe out pre-colonial lifestyle and practices of the newly colonized town from looking back to their pre-colonial lifestyle and practices. In fact, the land where the church stands is a former burial ground during pre-colonial times.

== Gallery ==
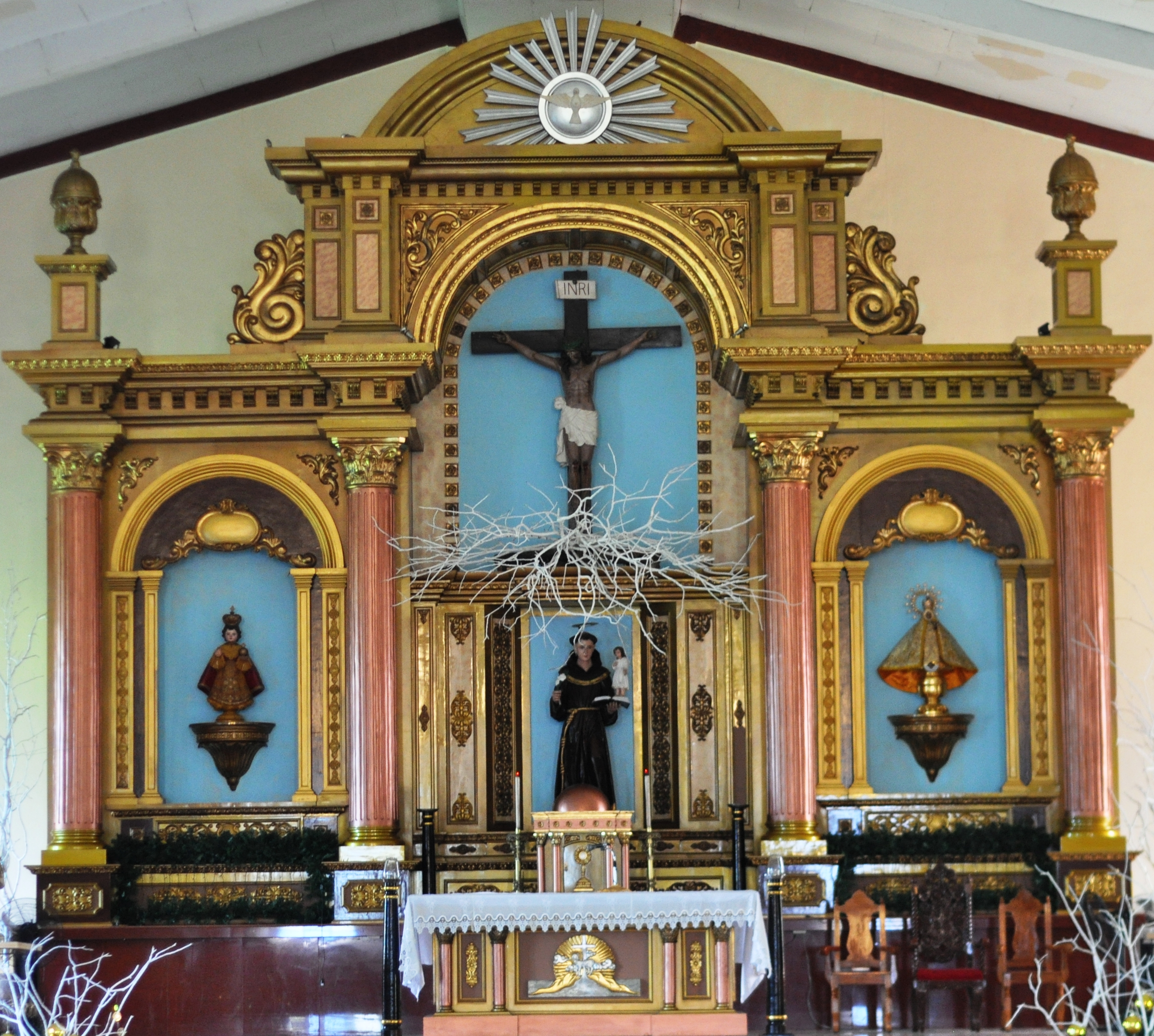
Church altar and retablo mayor

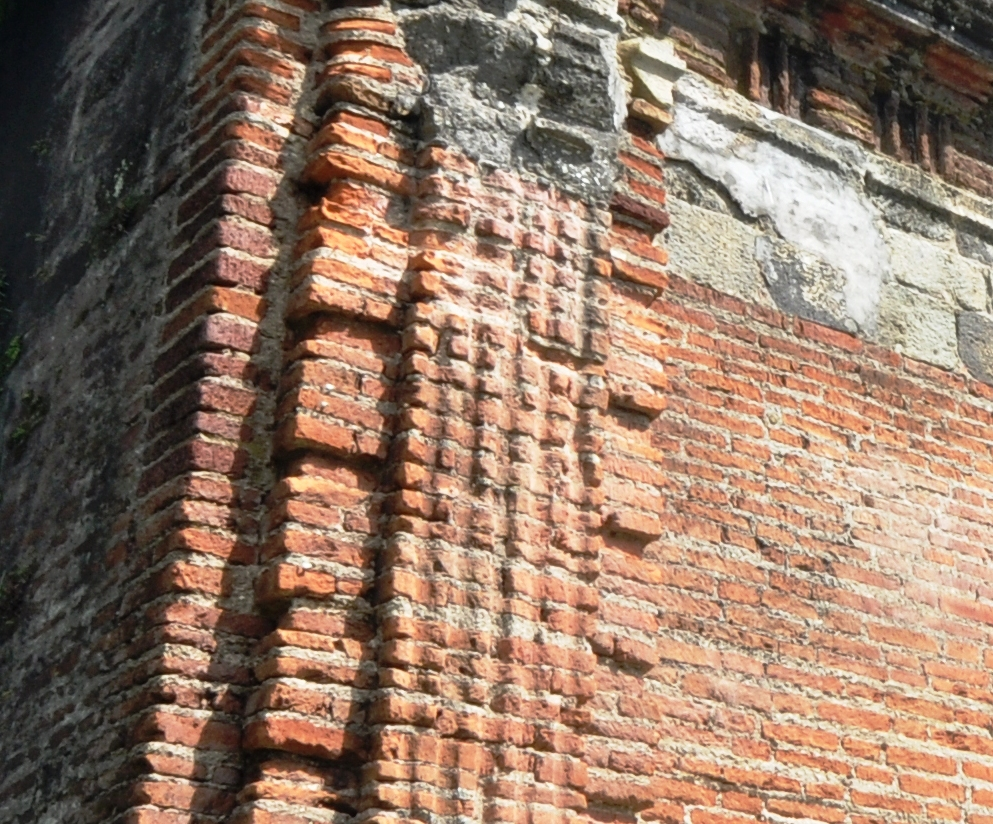
The church's bricks in detail

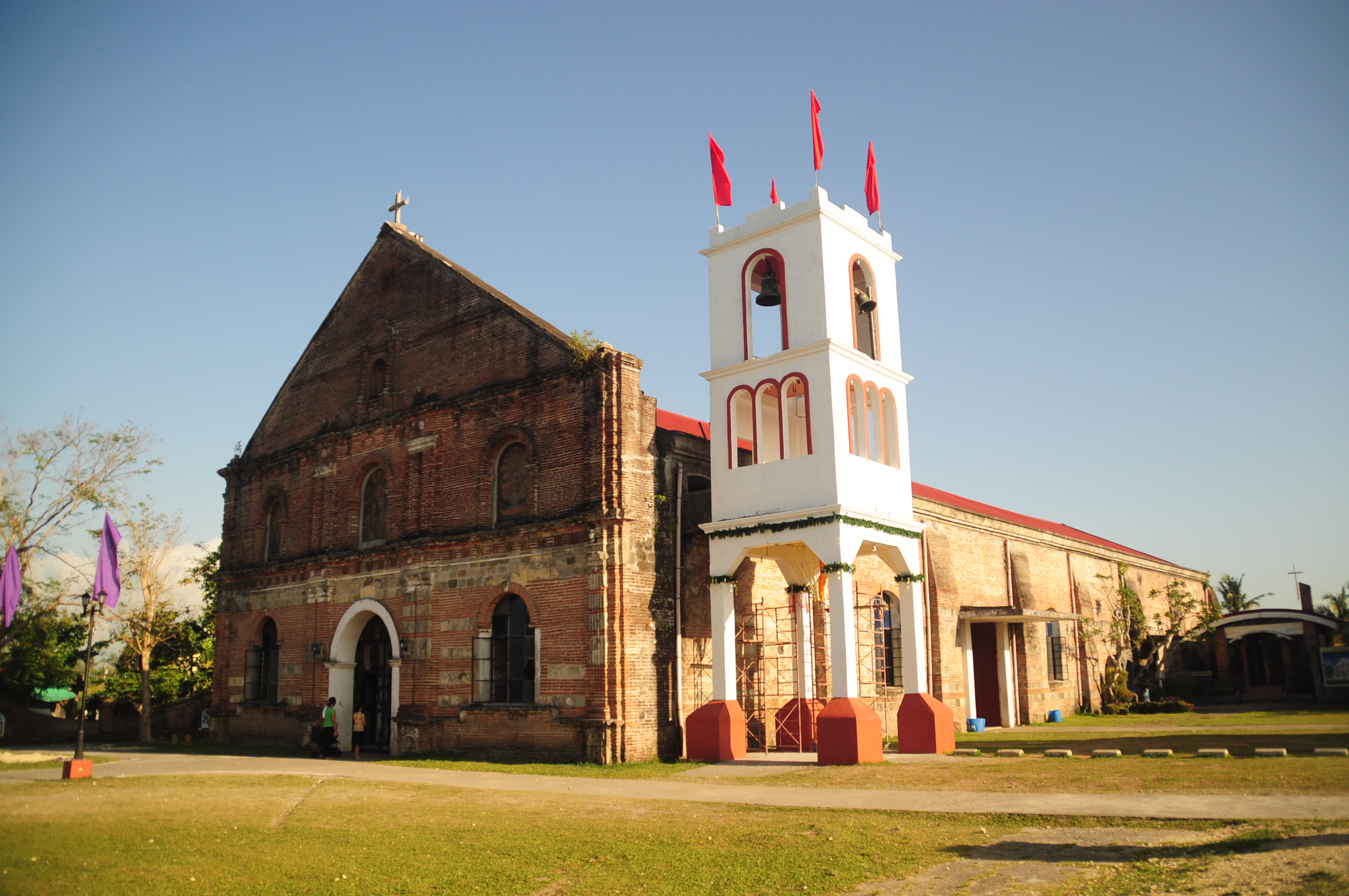
The church with its newly constructed belfry

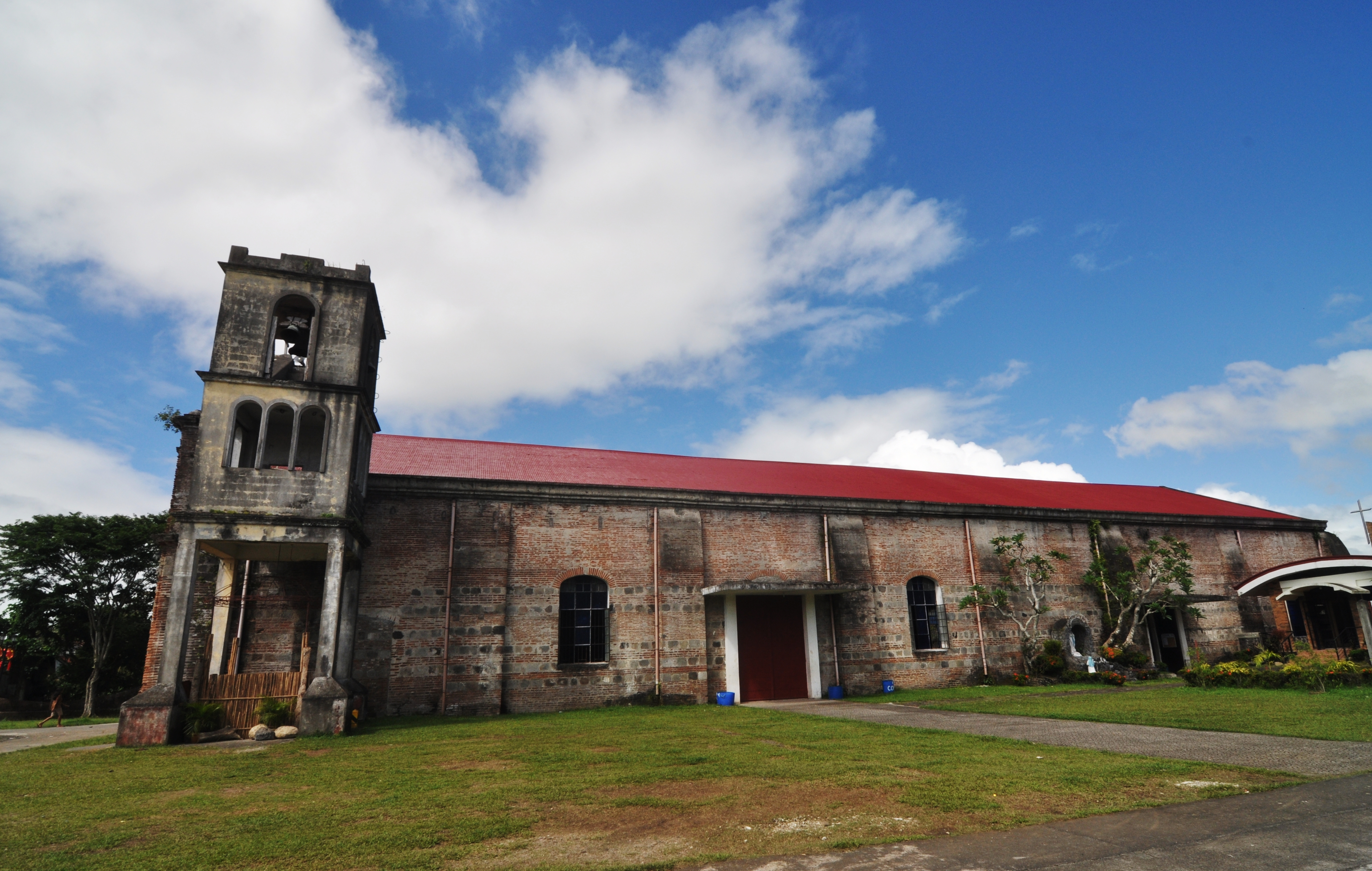
Church left side

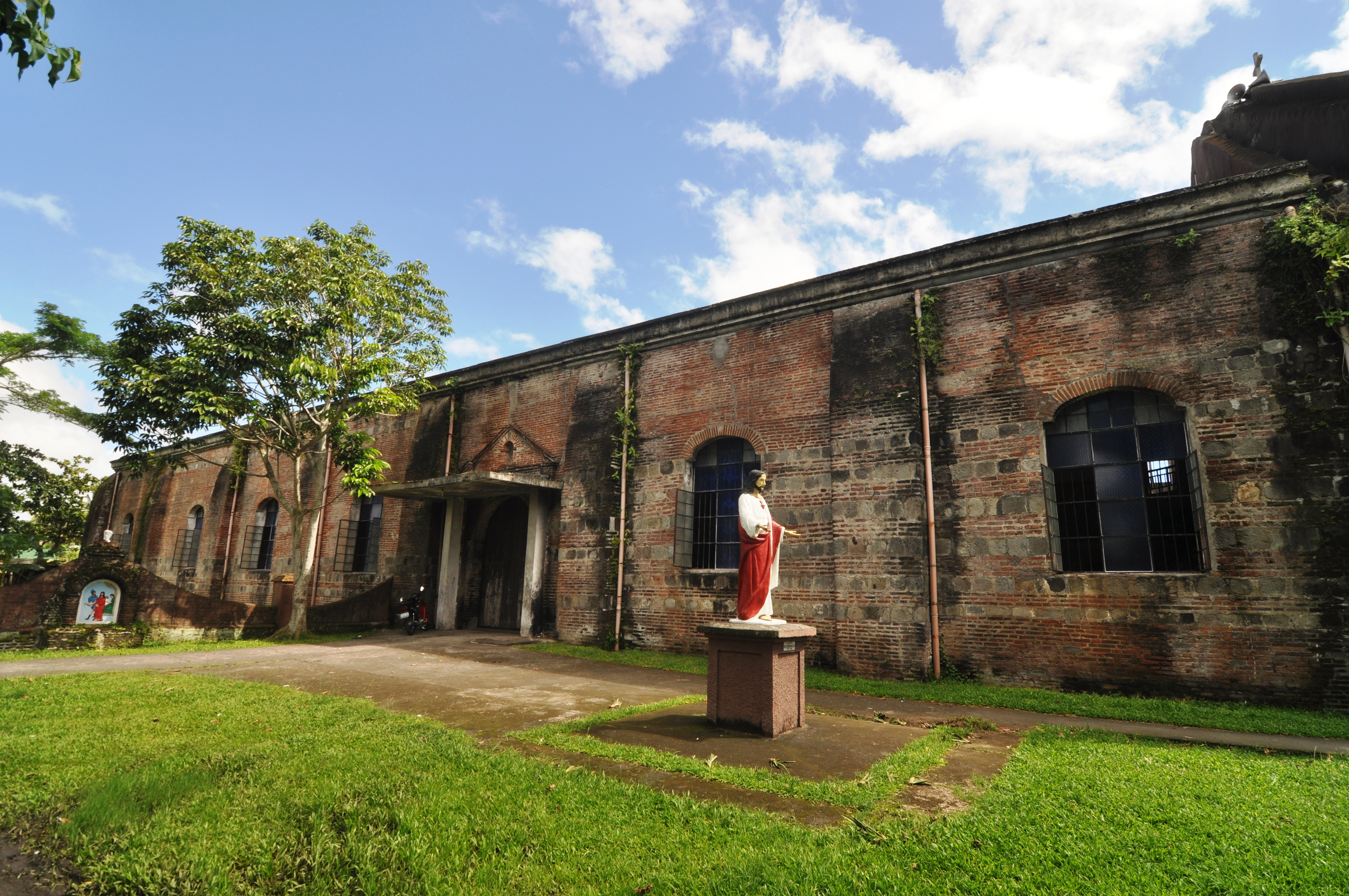
Church right side
