= Camaligan River Park =

Linear park in Camaligan, Philippines

- Camaligan Wharf
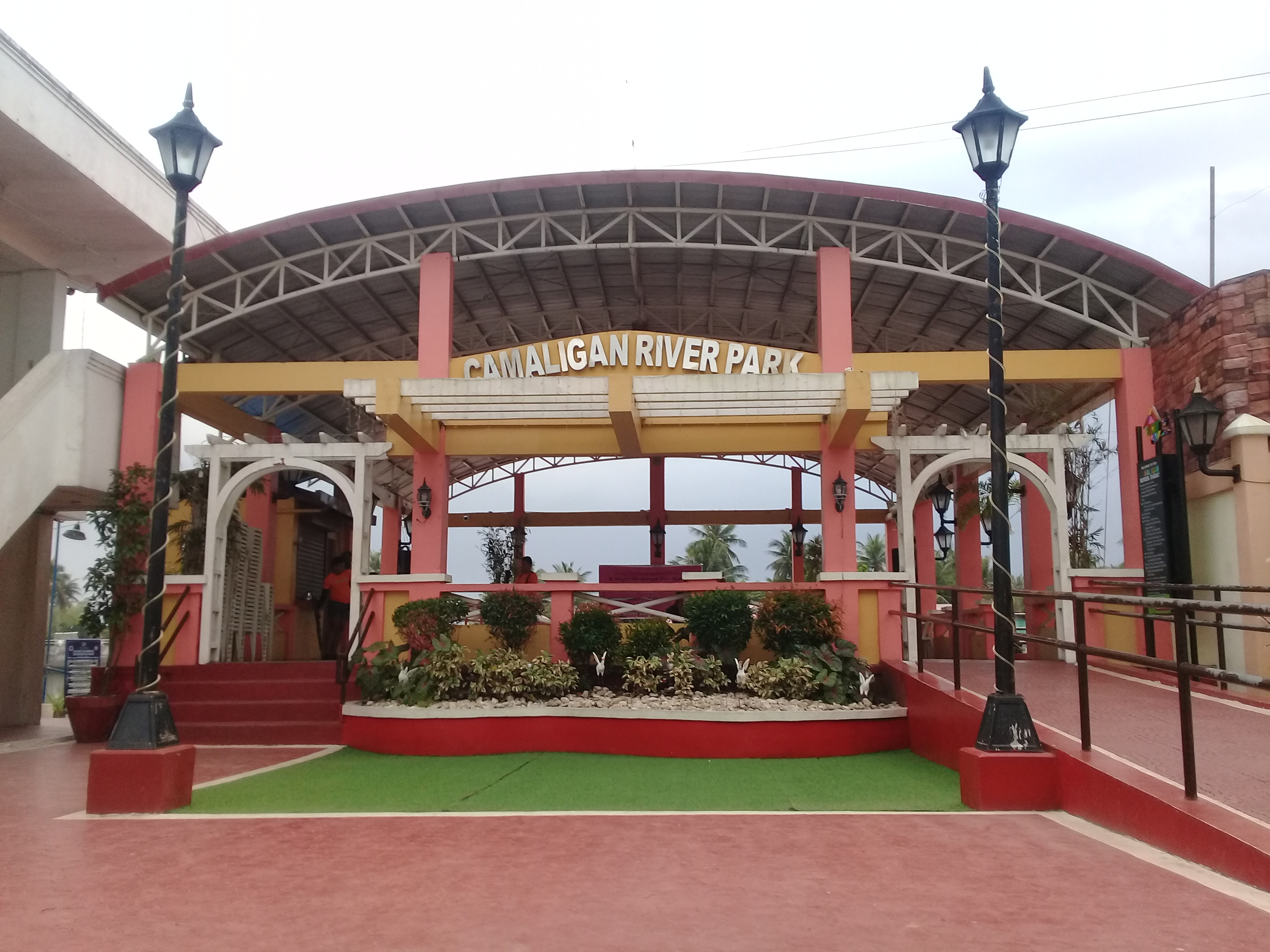
- Interactive map of Camaligan River Park
- Type: Linear park
- Location: Camaligan, Camarines Sur, Philippines
- Nearest city: Naga City
- Coordinates: 13°37′9.4″N 123°10′8.4″E
- Created: 2014
- Administrator: Tourism Information Center of Camaligan
- Operator: LGU Camaligan, Camarines Sur
- Open: 2017
- Status: Ongoing construction (Phase VI)

Camaligan River Park, also known as Camaligan Wharf, is a linear park in Camaligan, Camarines Sur, Philippines. Located beside the Bicol River, it is the only park being built inside the municipality of Camaligan.

Initially launched in June 2014 as Camaligan River Cruise Park, it was then renovated beginning 2016, and its reopening in 2017 attracted many visitors.

== Location ==
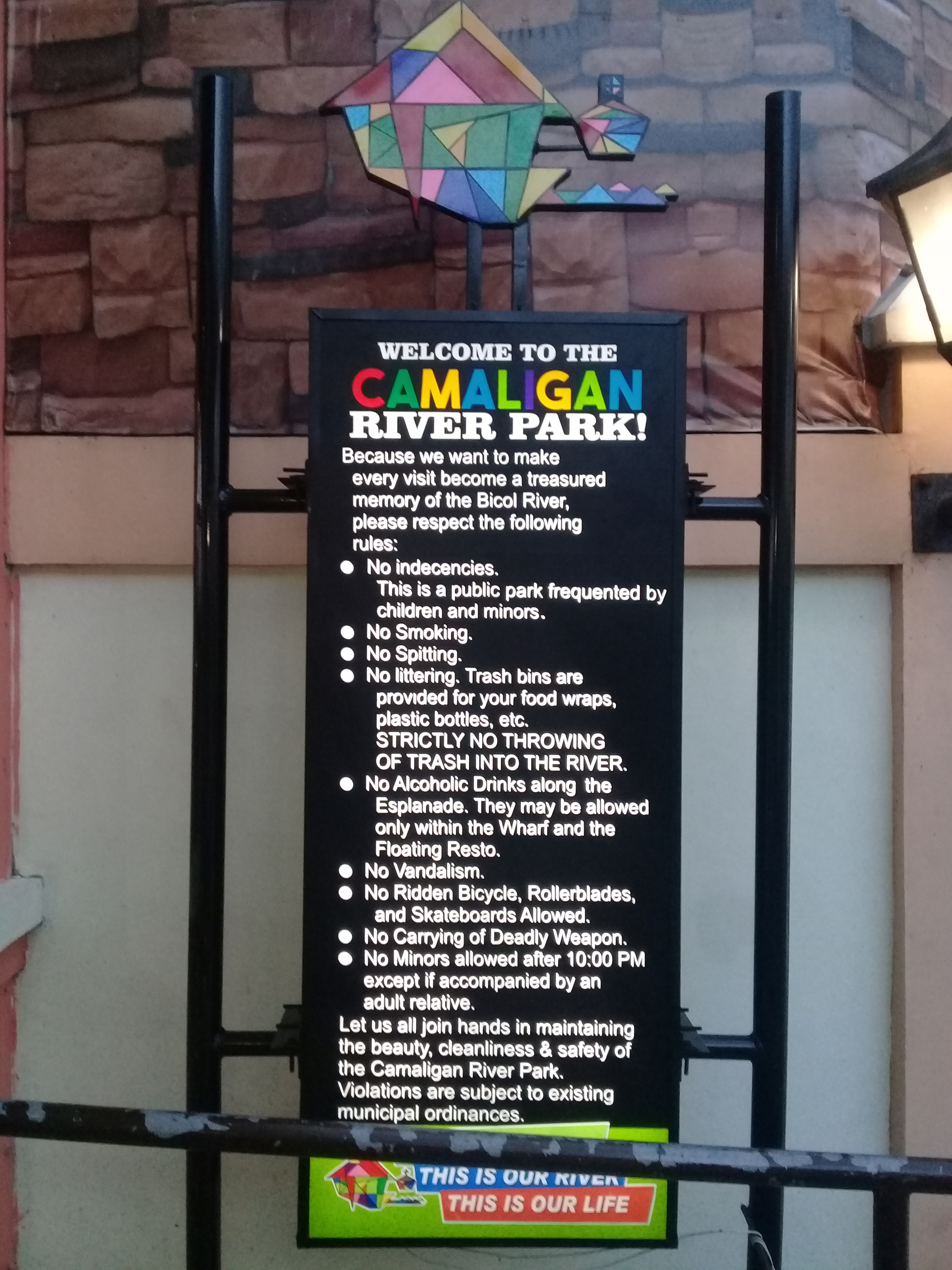
The Official Camaligan River Park Marker

The linear park is located along the riverside of the barangays of Sto. Domingo and San Jose-San Pablo in Camaligan. It is the most accessible river park outside the City of Naga.

== Creation ==
The park is a joint project of Department of Tourism Region V and the Local Government Unit of Camaligan, Camarines Sur under the Bottom-Up Budgeting Program for the year 2015. In 2014, it was planned only to be the docking site of the Camaligan River Cruise or M/B Camaligan, thus, first naming the park as Camaligan River Cruise Park.

Being located near the Bicol River, the people of Camaligan gained their socio-cultural identity as river people and traders during pre-colonialism. The idea of building the park was to promote the town's culture and bring life to the river as it is a reminder of Camaligan's significant contribution in the history and its integral role for the emergence of Bicol civilization.

== Improvements ==
Part of the Phase V, a P5.5-Million 50-meter hanging bridge, known as Camaligan Hanging Footbridge, or simply Camaligan Hanging Bridge, was erected which connected the isolated barangays of San Francisco and Tarosanan to the town proper of Camaligan.

== Other media ==
Camaligan River Park was featured in iJuander, a magazine show in GMA News TV on September 20, 2017. It was again featured in TV Patrol Bicol, a regional TV show under ABS-CBN on February 7, 2019.

== Image Gallery ==
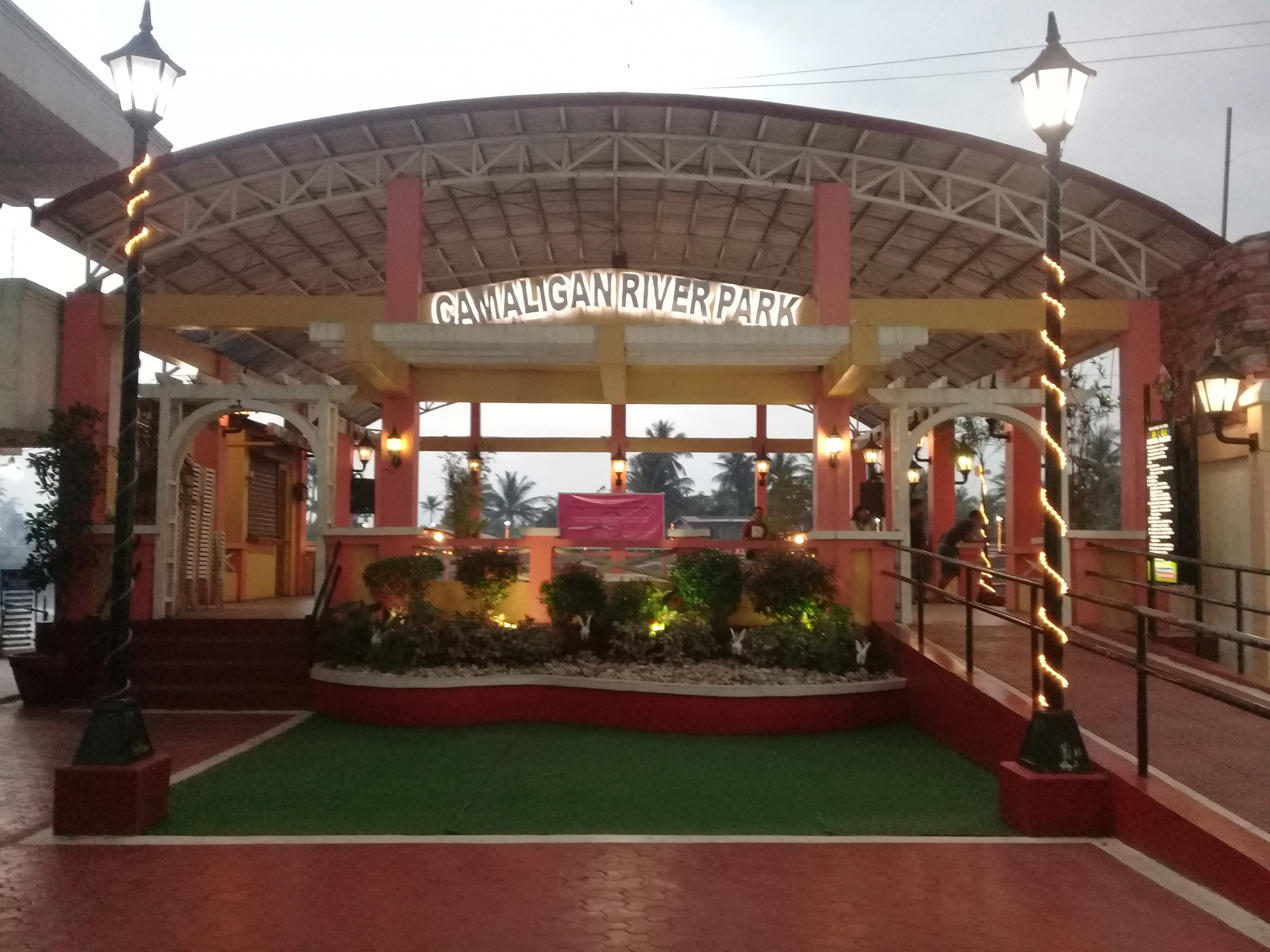
Facade

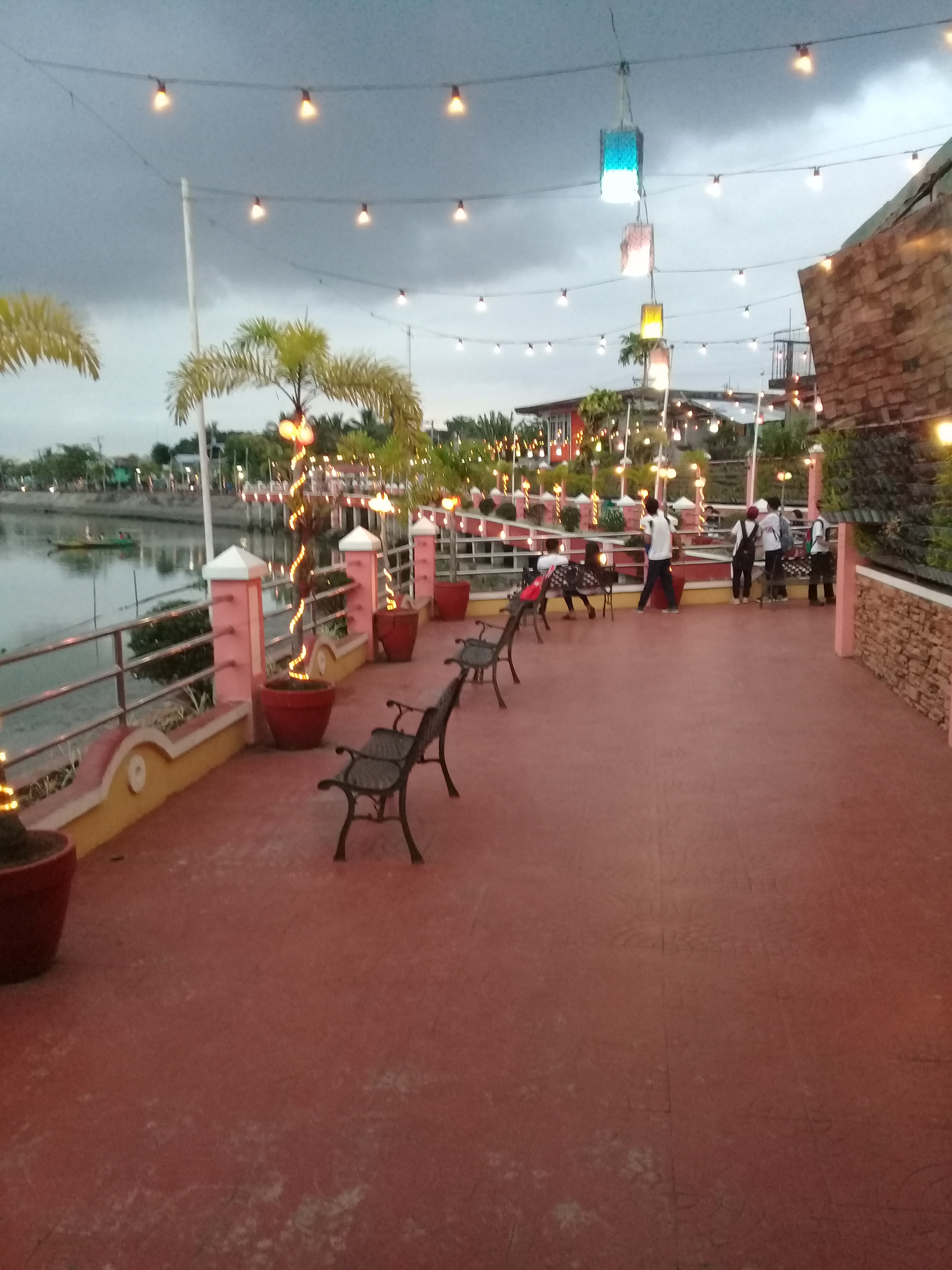
Entry Walk

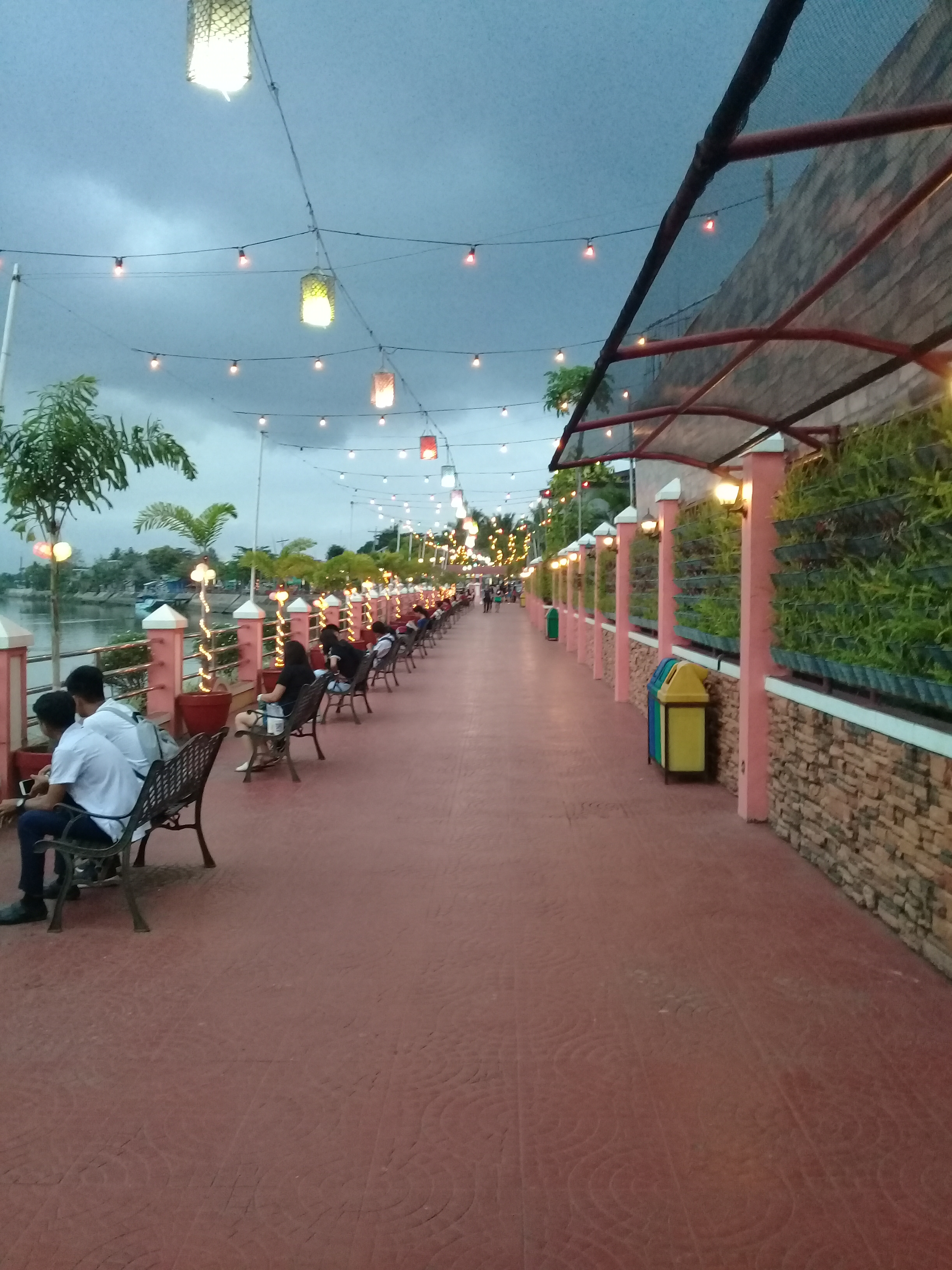
Linear Walk
