= Liberation of Nueva Cáceres (1898) =

- Part of Philippine Revolution
| Date | 18–19 September 1898 |
| Location | Nueva Cáceres (Present-day Naga, Camarines Sur) |
| Result | Filipino victory |

The Liberation of Nueva Cáceres (1898) was a significant event in the recent history of Bicol. It served as a reminder of the Filipino victory over the Spanish crown. It was liberated by Elias Angeles and Felix Plazo.

== Background ==
Two corporals, Elias Angeles and Felix Plazo, stationed at Nueva Cáceres in the First Philippine Republic, defied Spanish authority. As a result, they seized power from the Spanish crown to liberate Nueva Cáceres (modern-day Naga, Camarines Sur) from Spanish control.

It began with local revolts in Daet. On April 17, 1898, Corporals Elias Angeles and Felix Plazo were sent to Daet to reinforce the government troops there due to the increased activity of the local Katipunan led by Ildefonso Moreno. They traveled on a steamship named "Serrantes" with 25 other soldiers led by Capt. Francisco Andreu from Nueva Cáceres. There, they engaged in a conflict with the local Katipuneros in Daet.

In April 1898, the Katipunero group led by Moreno revolted in Daet. The Spanish forces sought refuge in the house of a Spanish businessman named Florencio Arana. However, the Guardia Civil arrived with a significant amount of weaponry, and the revolt was soon quelled. The Katipuneros engaged in a conflict with the Spanish forces in Daet. During the fight, a friend of a Spanish businessman named Florencio Arana was killed by a member of the Katipuneros led by Moreno. On that same night, 21 rebels were killed at Arana's house. Spanish authorities in Daet arrested and sentenced many rebels to death in the aftermath. It was during these events that Angeles and Plazo witnessed the actions of Moreno and his comrades who planned the revolt. A priest named Father Marcos Gomez (who was Spanish) reported that the bodies of the executed rebels were buried on the grounds of Arana's house.

This was not the only instance of Spanish forces defeating rebels. Many people fled Daet after the events. Spanish authorities searched for those involved in Moreno's revolt. The people of Daet eventually began to return, but the Spanish authorities continued to execute suspected rebels under the authority of the "Tribunal de Cochillo" (Committee of Executioners). This committee was formed by Florencio Arana, Father Antonio Mariblanca, and Lieutenant Maximiliano Correa.

Historian Juan Ataviado estimates that as many as 500 rebels may have been killed by Spanish forces in Daet. The two corporals, Angeles and Plazo, returned to Nueva Cáceres deeply affected by the events they witnessed in Daet. They harbored anger toward the Spaniards for their discriminatory treatment of the native population, using terms like "Indio". The year 1898 was a time of great hardship and emotional distress.

Rumors circulated that the Spanish forces were planning to relocate from Nueva Cáceres to Iloilo, which would become the new capital of the Spanish East Indies. News also arrived about the arrival of American forces in Manila Bay. Additionally, reports indicated that Vicente Lukbán's forces were approaching Camarines Norte without encountering resistance from the Spanish. It was further reported that upon reaching Iloilo, the Guardia Civil there fought desperately against a large rebel force in a sea battle. These developments in September 1898 motivated the two corporals, Angeles and Plazo, to plan a revolt in Nueva Cáceres. They acted quickly, rather than waiting for the transfer to Iloilo.

== Battle ==
Early in the morning of September 18, they occupied the Cuartel General, where on the second floor, Capt. Francisco Andreu was sleeping with his wife, two daughters, and one son. They went inside, killed the couple, and wounded the two daughters and son. With each gunshot, four volunteers went to the Cuartel and were met with bullets by the rebels. One of the volunteers, Francisco Borras, was shot along with others by the rebels. A medic, Ramon Felipe, was badly wounded in his arms and chest. A sergeant, Rodriguez, was also severely shot. Cpl. Felix Plazo, also an alcayde (jail warden), freed the prisoners from the prison of Tabuco, armed them, and they became allies. At Tabuco, Mr. Miguel Diaz de Montiel arrived at the battle with his wife, who was drinking coffee. The rebels quickly shot them. Lt. Antonio Cano was shot and wounded in the chest. The rebels also killed Mr. Pereda for running and calling for help. Prisoners freed from the prison continued to fire until 5 in the morning. As they walked to the city, they killed some young Spanish teenagers along the way, including a notary named Mr. Jose Ruibamba. It was reported that many Spanish forces were killed as a result of the revolt by the Guardia Civil. The Spanish forces tried to take the weapons from the rebels, who had already seized them from the Guardia Civil. Four hundred Spanish forces, some 80 years old, took refuge in the convent of San Francisco, where they were imprisoned. Carmelo Navarro, the highest-ranking member of the Guardia Civil, thought of nothing but surrender throughout the battle. Capt. Francisco Andreu fainted while being brought to the convent, having lost one eye. The situation of the Spanish forces deteriorated, and they could do nothing but hide in the convent of San Francisco, along with the other deteriorated Spanish troops.

== Surrender to the rebels ==
Spain and the rebels ended the battle with a peace treaty signed on September 19, 1898. The signing took place at the Universidad de Sta. Isabel, where the Spanish requested a ceasefire in exchange for their surrender. Earlier, rebels had freed prisoners held by a jail warden, following a battle with Spanish soldiers.

Following the surrender of the Spanish forces to the rebels, the rebels were allowed to keep the weapons they had captured earlier. The Spanish forces also relinquished their belongings, including silver coins, records, and government documents. In a gesture of goodwill, the rebels pledged not to attack any Spaniards after the battle and offered amnesty to the Spanish forces.
