= USI Night High School =

Private high school in Camarines Sur, Philippines

USI-NHS
- Naga City, Camarines Sur; Philippines

Information
- Type: Private
- Established: School year 1998-1999
- Principal: Josephine T. Ensano
- Faculty: 21 licensed high school teachers
- Grades: 7 to 12
- Enrollment: 420
- Campus: Universidad de Sta. Isabel
- Color: Sky Blue
- Website: www.usi.edu.ph

The USI Night High School (USI-NHS) is an independent branch of the Basic Education Department of Universidad de Sta. Isabel that caters a five-year secondary level education (or high school) to specifically less-privileged girls or women who work during the day, so that they could study or finish high school after working hours.

The USI-NHS Secondary Education Curriculum has been reengineered to give more emphasis to technology and livelihood education, in anticipation of the great percentage of its graduates who could not afford college education.

In spite of the students' being less-privileged, they are encouraged to live up to the Vincentian doctrines inculcated by the university, where "service to the poor, is service to God". For being educated in, or a graduate of the Universidad de Sta. Isabel is already a privilege (grace) given by God, therefore they too should extend God's grace to others who are also less-privileged, and the poorest of the poor.

== History of USI-NHS ==
Inspired by the charisma of St. Vincent de Paul, the administration of the, then Colegio de Sta. Isabel, headed by its president, Sister Justine I. Rosales, D.C. thought of opening a night secondary classes for working girls / women.

A survey was made by Dr. Milagros Reyes, head of the Research and Development Office, to the nearby barangays of Naga City to find out the feasibility of opening a high school night classes in CSI.

In the school year 1998–1999, Sister Justine I. Rosales, D.C., the school president opened the Night High School with Josephine T. Ensano appointed as the principal. It started with 12 students only in the first year, after campaigning from the different offices in the city where there are employers with household helps. The following year SY 1999–2000, the two year levels had 50 students. In SY 2000–2001, the three year levels had 85 students and it consistently increased to 447 last school year for the five year levels, in its tenth year. Government recognition was granted on August 2, 2002.

The Night High School had its six batches of graduates from 2003 with the first batch of 18 students. In 2004, another 18 students, in 2005, 16 students, in 2006, there were 28 graduates, in 2007, 35 graduates and in 2008, 39 graduates.

Every year, the department is also improving in many ways. There are very good committed veteran teachers who volunteered to teach. These teachers are also teaching in the Basic Education Day Dept., some are from the Higher Education Dept., and others are co-academic personnel who are teachers themselves and some from other schools teaching during the day.

In 2004, some qualified 50 students in the first year until their fourth year were granted by FAPE with the ESC program of the government financial assistance to private school students. Now, in its 5th year of the program, there is a total of 283 ESC and EVS grantees enjoying the four years assistance of P5,000.00 each every year. 5th year students who were not able to pay their tuition fees were helped by the H.S. Batch 1969, their yearly scholarship program.

The department acquired instructional materials such as computers, TV sets with DVD, radios and karaoke, science apparatuses, overhead projector and books through the donations from the USI alumni abroad, the Lilia Tan Foundation and the ESC and EVS grantees. The students have sets of textbooks for rent, which are increasing in number every year.

== The USI-NHS Seal ==
Night High School Seal

The Night High School Logo is emblazoned in the department's motif, which is the Sky Blue color. A Moon, along with the five stars around it symbolizes "Night", implying the department's late class schedules. The moon is in its crescent form in the very first quarter of the month, or the start of the lunar month or the New Moon. As the New Moon it symbolizes the bright new beginning of a less-privileged individual to elevate her (perhaps also her family's) status. As crescent, the moon specifically means "waxing", "increasing", and "to grow", as students of the Night High School are urged to grow mentally, physically, and mostly, spiritually. The moon also appears to be embracing the University Seal of Universidad de Sta Isabel, meaning the Night High Student must embrace the Vincentian ideals of the university, for such growths to materialize. The moon and the university seal is surrounded by five stars. Each star is the five-pointed pentacle, that in Christian symbolism means the five wounds of Christ when He died on the cross. As they are Christ's pain sacrifices, the pentacle also symbolizes the pains and sacrifices of a Night High Student who works during the day, and attends classes at night while everybody's at rest as shown by the sleeping expression of the Crescent Moon. The five stars symbolizes the five year levels as the Night High School has a five-year Secondary Education Curricula. Each star is placed in precisely equal distances around the moon, forming the five sturdy spokes of a wheel, meaning support. Like a wheel the Night High School shall roll continuously as long as there are less-privileged women with a dream.

== General information ==
=== The Night High School Program ===
The Night High School Program is a formation program catered to the less-privileged girls / women to become better persons as they move from the first year to the fifth year, be better equipped with the set of knowledge, attitudes, values and skills towards becoming a fully mature Christian and Vincentian Filipino.

=== The curriculum ===
The NHS is a five-year curriculum adopting the NSEC and Basic Education Curriculum (BEC) modified with emphasis on livelihood-orientation.

=== Schedule of Classes ===
From Monday to Friday classes start at 5:20 p.m. and end at 8:40 p.m. On Saturdays, classes start at 1:00 p.m. until 6:30 p.m. for 1st and 2nd years, 7:00 p.m. for 3rd to 5th years in the months of June to March. For April and May, classes have the same schedule, except for Saturdays, classes start at 2:00 until 5:30 p.m.

=== School uniform ===
The prescribed school uniform is the standard high school uniform of the university to be worn from Monday to Friday. Saturday is a wash day or non-uniform day but in strictly specified attire. P.E. uniform is a prescribed T-shirt with jogging pants and rubber shoes.

== Students' services and facilities ==
The classrooms of the BED during the day are also used by the Night High School students at the St. Vincent de Paul building, second and third floors.

Even though the Night High principal's office has a book center for lending students book references for their assignments or research works, the Night High students are also welcome at the College Library as it is the only open library of the university left after office hours.

Other facilities are already centralized in the university, and are accessible upon request of the department.

== Admission policies ==
=== Qualification ===
- Must be working during the day.
- Must have a general average of not below 78% to be able to take the Diagnostic Test.
- Must have at least a raw score of 30 out of 50 in the test to qualify for enrolment.
- If score is below 30, a remedial class in Reading or/and Math is advisable. General Average in previous * year or grade is not below 80%.
- Parents have no stable income.

=== Requirements for Enrolment ===
- Report Card (Form 138)
- Birth and Baptismal Certificates (Xerox only)
- Certificate of Good Moral Character from the School Principal or Guidance Counselor
- Certificate of Tax Exemption of the family annual income.
- Interview to the student, parent, guardian/employer.
- Certificate of Employment and Permit to Study (for those with employer).
- Contract between Employer and Parent on the manner or arrangement of financial obligation in school.
- Home visitation.
