= Camaligan National High School =

Public high school in Camarines Sur, Philippines

- Pambansang Mataas na Paaralan ng Camaligan (Filipino)

Location
- Camaligan, Camarines Sur; Philippines
- Coordinates: 13°37′15″N 123°09′56″E

Information
- Former name: Sto. Tomas National High School (1979-2013)
- Type: Public
- Established: 1 July 1979
- Founder: Barangay Council of Sto. Tomas, Camaligan, Camarines Sur
- School district: Camaligan District
- Oversight: Department of Education
- School code: 302052
- Officer in charge: Marilou R. Abias
- Grades: 7 to 12
- Enrollment: 2,067 (S/Y 2017-2018)
- Language: English; Filipino; Bikol
- Campus: San Jose-San Pablo, Camaligan, Camarines Sur (JHS); Dugcal, Camaligan, Camarines Sur (SHS)
- Colors: Blue and White
- Song: "CNHS Hymn"
- Athletics: Palarong Panlalawigan, Palarong Bicol, Palarong Pambansa
- Sports: Basketball Volleyball Sepak Takraw Chess Badminton Dancesport
- Publication: Tomasian Bulletin (English); Ang Batyaw (Filipino)
- Affiliation: Division of Camarines Sur
- Website: wix.com

Camaligan National High School (Filipino: Pambansang Mataas na Paaralan ng Camaligan), or simply CNHS, is a public high school in Camaligan, Camarines Sur, Philippines. It serves the people of the thirteen barangays of the town, its neighboring municipalities Gainza and Canaman, and the City of Naga.

Formerly known as Sto. Tomas National High School, it was established in 1979 through the efforts of the Barangay Council of Sto. Tomas. In 2013, the school was renamed since it is the only existing high school established inside the municipality.

== History ==
The school was conceived through the efforts of the Barangay Council of Sto. Tomas, Camaligan, Camarines Sur headed by the former Barangay Chairman Andres Servidad on 1 April 1979. A proposal was made and all of the barangay chairmen of Camaligan were informed about the plan.

On the last week of May 1979, a meeting at the municipal hall was called for the finalization the opening of the school, being attended by Henry Aguire (Human Settlement Officer), Olap Benosa (District Supervisor), Godolfredo N. Cordial (Camaligan Central School Principal), Dalmacio A. Aurellano (Municipal Mayor), Roger P. Cariño (Municipal Councilor), Ramon Caceres (Municipal Treasurer), other municipal, barangay and school officials, and the present 58 enrollees. The school officially opened on 1 July 1979 as Sto. Tomas High School.

In 2012, the school adopted the K-12 Curriculum in response to the Enhanced Basic Education Act signed by President Benigno Aquino III.

In 2013, the school has been renamed to Camaligan National High School due to it being the only existing high school in town.

== School Hymn ==
The Camaligan National High School Hymn (originally Sto. Tomas National High School Hymn), or simply CNHS Hymn, is the official school hymn. It was written by Lilian P. Sanglay and Nancy D. Olaño, and its music was arranged by Venrich Kenosis Hermogeno.

The hymn was launched in March 2013, being performed by the school choir. It is both in English and in Bikol languages.

== Supreme Students Government ==
The CNHS Supreme Students Government (CNHS-SSG), is the highest governing body of the entire studentry of the school. It is headed by the president, together with his/her subordinates, who were elected by the whole student population of the school.

== School Publications ==
Tomasian Bulletin is the official school English publication. In 2005, Ang Batyaw, the school's official Filipino publication, was launched.

Due to the renaming of the school in 2013, proposals on changing the name of the English publication had been raised.
