= Camaligan =

Municipality in Camarines Sur, Philippines

- Municipality
- Municipality of Camaligan
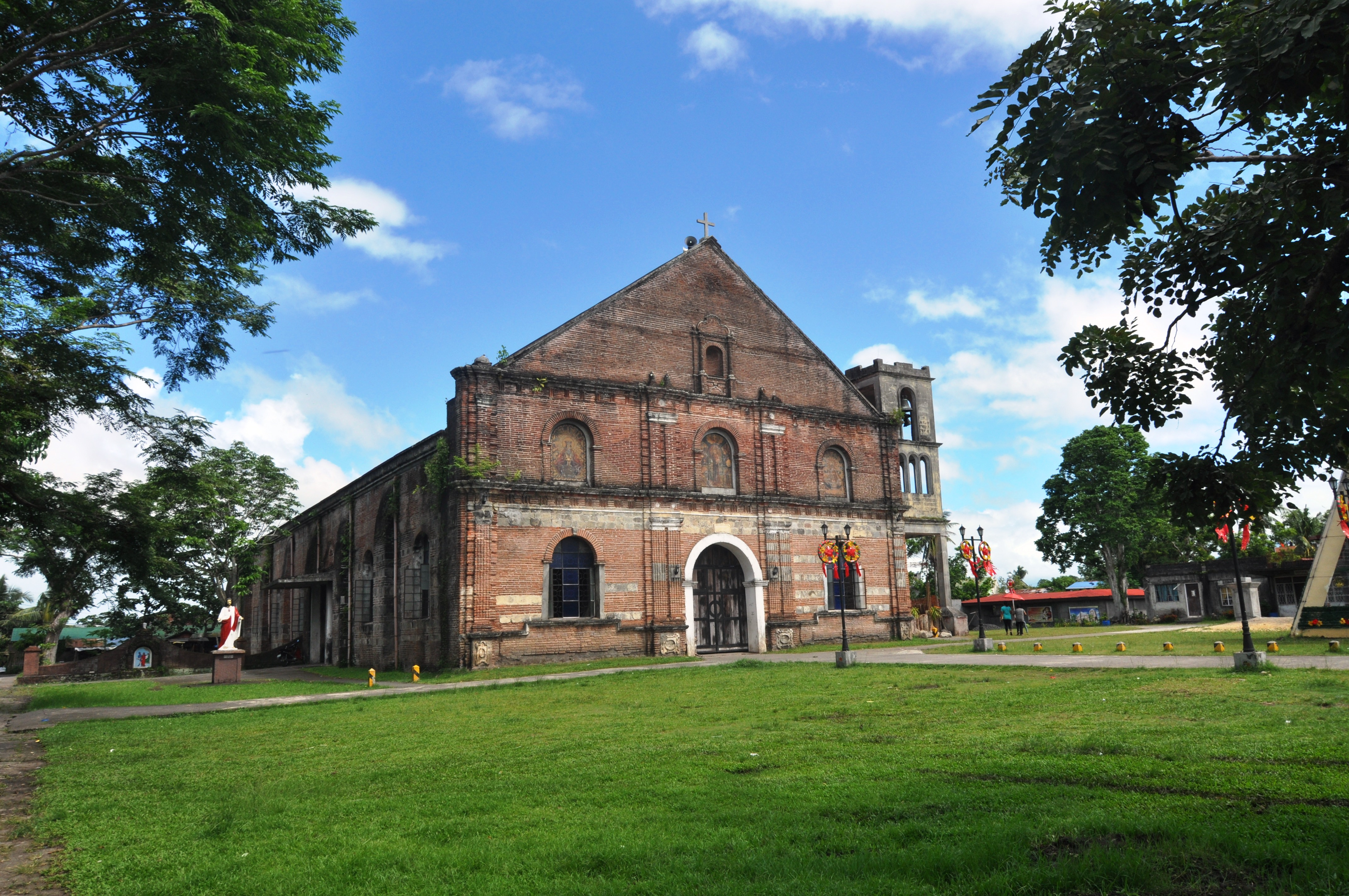
- St. Anthony of Padua Parish Church

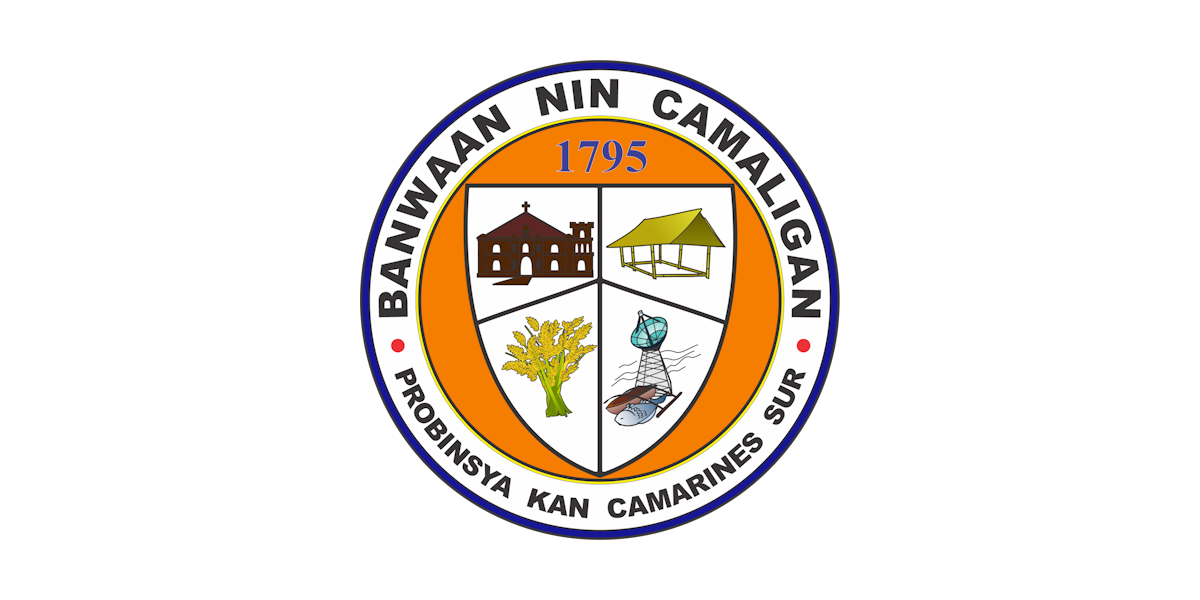
- Flag
- Etymology: Tagalog: kamalig + an ("place of sheds")
- Nickname: The Small Town with a Big Heart
- Anthem: Camaligan Kong Namomótan; My Beloved Camaligan
- Map of Camarines Sur with Camaligan highlighted
- Interactive map of Camaligan
- Location within the Philippines
- Coordinates: 13°37′15″N 123°09′56″E
- Country: Philippines
- Region: Bicol Region
- Province: Camarines Sur
- District: 3rd district
- Founded: 1795 1900 (Annexed to Nueva Caceres), 1909 (re-independence)
- Barangays: 13 (see Barangays)

Government
  - Type: Sangguniang Bayan
  - Mayor: Diano S. Ibardaloza, Jr.
  - Vice Mayor: Felix N. Prado
  - Representative: Nelson S. Legacion
  - Municipal Council: Members: Lone District; Neal Adrian C. Deleña; Gabriel DV. Flores; John Paul Q. Mendina; Leonardo DR. Abias; Rodelio DL. Punazalan; Shiela SJ. Aquid; Loretta A. Acabado; George A. Rabina
  - Electorate: 16,676 voters (2025)

Area
  - Total: 4.68 km^{2} (1.81 sq mi)
- Elevation: 4.0 m (13.1 ft)
- Highest elevation: 24 m (79 ft)
- Lowest elevation: −3 m (−9.8 ft)

Population (2024 census)
  - Total: 25,218
  - Density: 5,390/km^{2} (14,000/sq mi)
  - Households: 5,353
- Demonym(s): Camaligueño (masculine); Camaligueña (feminine)

Economy
  - Income class: 4th municipal income class
  - Poverty incidence: 19.76% (2023)
  - Revenue: ₱ 114.7 million (2024)
  - Assets: ₱ 289.7 million (2024)
  - Expenditure: ₱ 111.9 million (2024)
  - Liabilities: ₱ 36.16 million (2024)

Service provider
  - Electricity: Camarines Sur 1 Electric Cooperative (CASURECO 1)
- Time zone: UTC+8 (PST)
- ZIP code: 4401
- PSGC: 0501709000
- IDD : area code: +63 (0)54
- Native languages: Central Bikol; Tagalog
- Feast date: June 13 (Poblacion)
- Catholic diocese: Archdiocese of Caceres
- Patron saint: St. Anthony of Padua, St. Teresa of Calcutta

Camaligan, officially the Municipality of Camaligan (Central Bikol: Banwaan kan Camaligan; Tagalog: Bayan ng Camaligan), is a municipality in the province of Camarines Sur, Philippines. According to the 2024 census, it has a population of 25,218 people. Camaligan rapidly became an urban town during the 1990s.

It is home to the oldest known pre-colonial site in the Bicol region, dating 500 AD to 600 AD, making it an undeclared important archaeological zone.

== Etymology ==
The origin of the town and its name can be traced back to the early settlers of the place. Known as the cortadores, or woodcutters, to the early Spanish colonizers who came to the place in the early 1700s, the settlers cut timbers from nearby mountains located upriver or around San Miguel Bay and made this as their form of living. Out of these timbers, they hewed out canoes or bancas which they stored under small sheds or huts. Later, when these sheds became abundant in the area, as they were made the permanent dwelling places by these canoe makers, the place was called "Camaligan", which means "a place where many sheds can be found", by combining the root word kamalig (or shed) and the locative suffix -an. The sheds served to shelter the canoe makers and protect their boats from the natural elements. Hence, the name and origin of the town is historically tied to the Bicol River and its early inhabitants.

"Catagbacan" was the oldest known name of Camaligan. Moreover, according to D. Adolfo Puya y Ruiz, in his “Camarines Sur – Descripcion General De Està Provincia En Luzon” (Manila: 1887), Camaligan was called "Kinamaligan" before.

== History ==
=== Pre-colonial era ===
The town of Camaligan is a known archeological site. In 2016 to 2017, hundreds of artifacts, including shells, jar fragments, tools, other deposits, pig bones, deer bones, stingray cartilage, shark cartilage, and at least fifteen (15) pre-colonial human remains, were found in the area, which marked a revolutionary phase in Bicol archaeology. The shells and tools found in the town was dated back 1,500 years ago or approximately 500 to 600 AD. The site contained no trace of Chinese, Southeast Asian, or South Asian trade links, making Camaligan a pure pre-colonial Bicolano site.

=== Spanish era ===
The settlers of the religious visita of Nueva Caceres, which was then under its ecclesiastical jurisdiction, arrived in the town by the 17th century. The pre-colonial cemetery and community center were transformed by the Spanish into the town's current church compound to diminish native belief systems and instill Catholicism. During this time, Camaligan had five barrios in its jurisdiction, namely Marupit, Doncal (now Dugcal), Sua, San Roque and Tarosanan. Each barrio has a small wooden chapel.

On 5 June 1795, a petition to the Spanish religious authorities was sent by the natives and signed by the supposedly officials of the place, to request for a resident curate. The officials’ names were Andre Casa, Diego, Lobao, Simeon de la Cruz, Manuel del Espiritu Santo, Fernando Valenzuela, Agustin del Espiritu Santo, Marcos David, Domingo Flores, Pedro Negre, Bartolome Rodriguez and Valentine de los Santos. Fray Rafael de Benavente was appointed as the first parish priest.

=== American era ===
In 1902, the municipality was officially established through an act of the Philippine legislature. It also named Pedro Bustamante as the first municipal mayor. This event of the creation of the Municipality of Camaligan was brought about by a historical fact when the town was eventually separated from being as an annex of Nueva Caceres (now Naga City).

== Geography ==
With an area of 468.8 hectares (1,158 acres), it is the smallest municipality in Camarines Sur, but it is the densest, having an approximation of 5,200 persons per square kilometer, which is almost twice the density of the neighboring City of Naga of 2,456 per square kilometer.

=== Barangays ===
Camaligan is politically subdivided into 13 barangays. Each barangay consists of puroks and some have sitios.

Barangays	Class	Population	Barangay Head
Dugcal	Rural	4,464	Gabriel Jr. DV. Flores
Marupit	Rural	4,510	Delia B. Mansor
San Francisco	Rural	745	Eden G. Torallo
San Jose-San Pablo (Poblacion)	Rural	671	Eden B. Bon
San Juan-San Ramon (Poblacion)	Rural	982	Emeterio M. Avila
San Lucas (Poblacion)	Rural	578	Cyril O. Agomaa
San Marcos (Poblacion)	Rural	1,388	Susana Agna
San Mateo (Poblacion)	Rural	1,508	Carlos Q. Mariscal, Jr.
San Roque	Rural	3,585	Rolando P. Marasigan
Santo Domingo (Poblacion)	Rural	618	Maria Teresa A. Ruiz
Santo Tomas (Poblacion)	Rural	810	Maria Jasmin M. Trinidad
Sua	Rural	2,154	Servando Santa Ana
Tarosanan	Rural	2,096	Salvador Lorente

=== Climate ===
Climate data for Camaligan, Camarines Sur
Month	Jan	Feb	Mar	Apr	May	Jun	Jul	Aug	Sep	Oct	Nov	Dec	Year
Mean daily maximum °C (°F)	32 (90)	31 (88)	34 (93)	36 (97)	37 (99)	37 (99)	36 (97)	34 (93)	35 (95)	34 (93)	33 (91)	32 (90)	34 (94)
Mean daily minimum °C (°F)	27 (81)	27 (81)	29 (84)	31 (88)	32 (90)	32 (90)	31 (88)	30 (86)	30 (86)	29 (84)	28 (82)	28 (82)	30 (85)
Average precipitation mm (inches)	39.34 (1.55)	68.7 (2.70)	26.73 (1.05)	66.19 (2.61)	84.49 (3.33)	178.89 (7.04)	244.27 (9.62)	188.3 (7.41)	160.98 (6.34)	445.0 (17.52)	135.5 (5.33)	367.8 (14.48)	2,006.19 (78.98)
Average rainy days	16	18	13	15	23	28	30	24	26	27	25	29	274
Source: World Weather Online (Use with caution: this is modeled/calculated data, not measured locally.)

Camaligan has a significant amount of rainfall during the year. This is true even for the driest month. According to the Köppen climate classification system, Camaligan has a tropical rainforest climate. The average annual temperature is 27.1 °C in Camaligan. About 2527 mm of precipitation falls annually.

== Demographics ==
Population census of Camaligan
Year	Pop.	±% p.a.
1918	2,133	—
1939	3,005	+1.65%
1948	7,362	+10.47%
1960	8,529	+1.23%
1970	7,821	−0.86%
1975	9,853	+4.74%
1980	10,989	+2.21%
1990	15,436	+3.46%
1995	17,411	+2.28%
2000	19,188	+2.11%
2007	20,758	+1.09%
2010	22,254	+2.56%
2015	24,109	+1.54%
2020	25,036	+0.80%
2024	25,218	+0.17%
Source: Philippine Statistics Authority

In the 2024 census, the population of Camaligan was 25,218 people, with a density of 5,400 inhabitants per square kilometre or 14,000 inhabitants per square mile.

== Economy ==
Poverty incidence of Camaligan (%)

Source: Philippine Statistics Authority

Bicol River serves as a natural source of irrigation and fertilization to the town where agriculture is still considered as a major industry.

Out of the 468 hectares total land area, 175 hectares are devoted to rice production, all of which are irrigated and fertilized by the river through its occasional flooding.

Camaligan was formerly included in the Metro Naga area before the designation was discontinued in 2017.

== Government ==
Camaligan is being headed by a mayor who is being elected by its residents.

The current mayor of the town is Diano Ibardaloza, Jr. Last May 2022 Election, he has been elected for his first term as the Municipal Mayor.

Since 1902, thirty-one (31) mayors already headed the town.

Term	Mayor
1902-1903	Pedro Bustamante
1904-1905	Quintin Bagsic
1905-1906	Catalino Alayan
1906-1907	Fabian Garcia
1908-1909	Tomas Salvador
1909-1911	Jose Agapor
1912-1915	Mauricio Cordial
1916-1919	Liberato Montiveros
1920-1923	Antonio Santa Ana
1924-1927	Pedro Flores
1928-1931	Vidal Custodio
1932-1935	Elias Agna de Dios
1936-1941	Teotimo Rebuquiao
1942-1944	Felipe Cuadrante
1944	Glecerio Blas
1945	Andres Diez
1946-1947	Julio Capucao
1948-1951	Francisco A. Aurellano
1952-1955	Buenaventura Plantado
1956-1963	Agapito T. Loriaga
1964-1967	Dalmacio Aurellano
1968-1971	Agapito T. Loriaga
1972-1986	Dalmacio Aurellano
1986	Napoleon Valiente
1986-1987	Amelito Belen
1987	Fabian A. Valenciano
1987-1988	Priscilla T. Aurellano
1988-1995	Manuel N. Prado
1995-2004	Rolando C. Eduardo
2004-2007	Pablo N. Prado
2007-2010	Rolando C. Eduardo
2010-2013	Emmanuel T. Prado
2013-2022	Marilou Marquez-Hirose
2022–Present	Diano S. Ibardaloza, Jr.

== Culture ==
The people of Camaligan derived their socio-cultural identity as river people from the existence of the river. Bicol River is an important resource for irrigation and fertilization of the land where agriculture and fishing is still considered as a major industry. The place's festivals, songs and dances found their roots and inspiration from the river. Hence, the river ecology has bred its own distinct community.

=== Festivals ===
Religious and cultural festivals are being held in the town.

- Kamalig Festival - Camaligan's main festival, which happens from June 5 to 13, in celebration of the town's founding anniversary and the feast of St. Anthony of Padua, the town's patron saint.
- Ati-atihan Festival - a street dance competition and parade inspired by the festival in Aklan of the same name, in honor of Santo Niño, the town's second patron.
- Kamaligang Pasko Festival - a celebration of Christmas wherein the town, most especially its people center and its river park, is being decorated, and a man-sized Christmas village is being set-up outside the municipal hall.

== Tourism ==
St. Anthony of Padua Parish Church is one of the oldest churches in the province of Camarines Sur. The church is one of the favorite spots for Visita Iglesia in the province.

Santo Domingo Chapel is an old chapel which was a former burial ground during pre-colonial times. It is a central archeological site where a lot of burial jars, porcelains and skeleton bones were found during the diggings.

Sira, or fish, is a small wharf painted with festive colors that is constructed on the riverside of barangay San Francisco. This also serves as a dock for banca passengers.

After the initial launching of Camaligan River Park on 1 June 2014, its tourism industry began to be more active. Its continuous improvements attracted many visitors, mostly coming from the City of Naga, to come and enjoy walking along the riverside.

M/B Camaligan is a motorboat which docks beside Camaligan River Park. Also known as Camaligan River Cruise, it is also a floating restaurant which crosses the Bicol River. Launched last 6 February 2019, it is the newest attraction which promotes the river culture of the town.

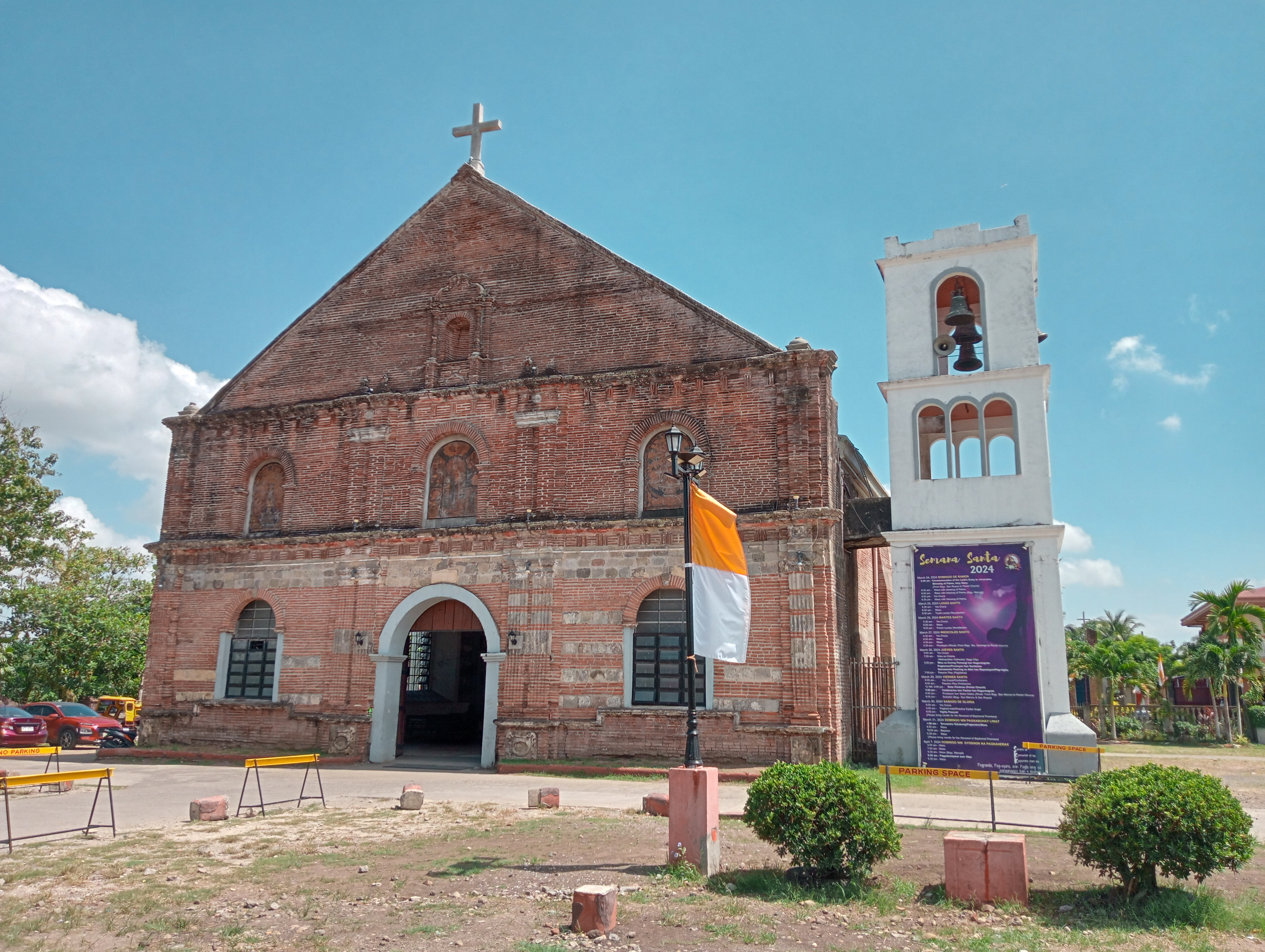
Façade of San Antonio de Padua Parish Church

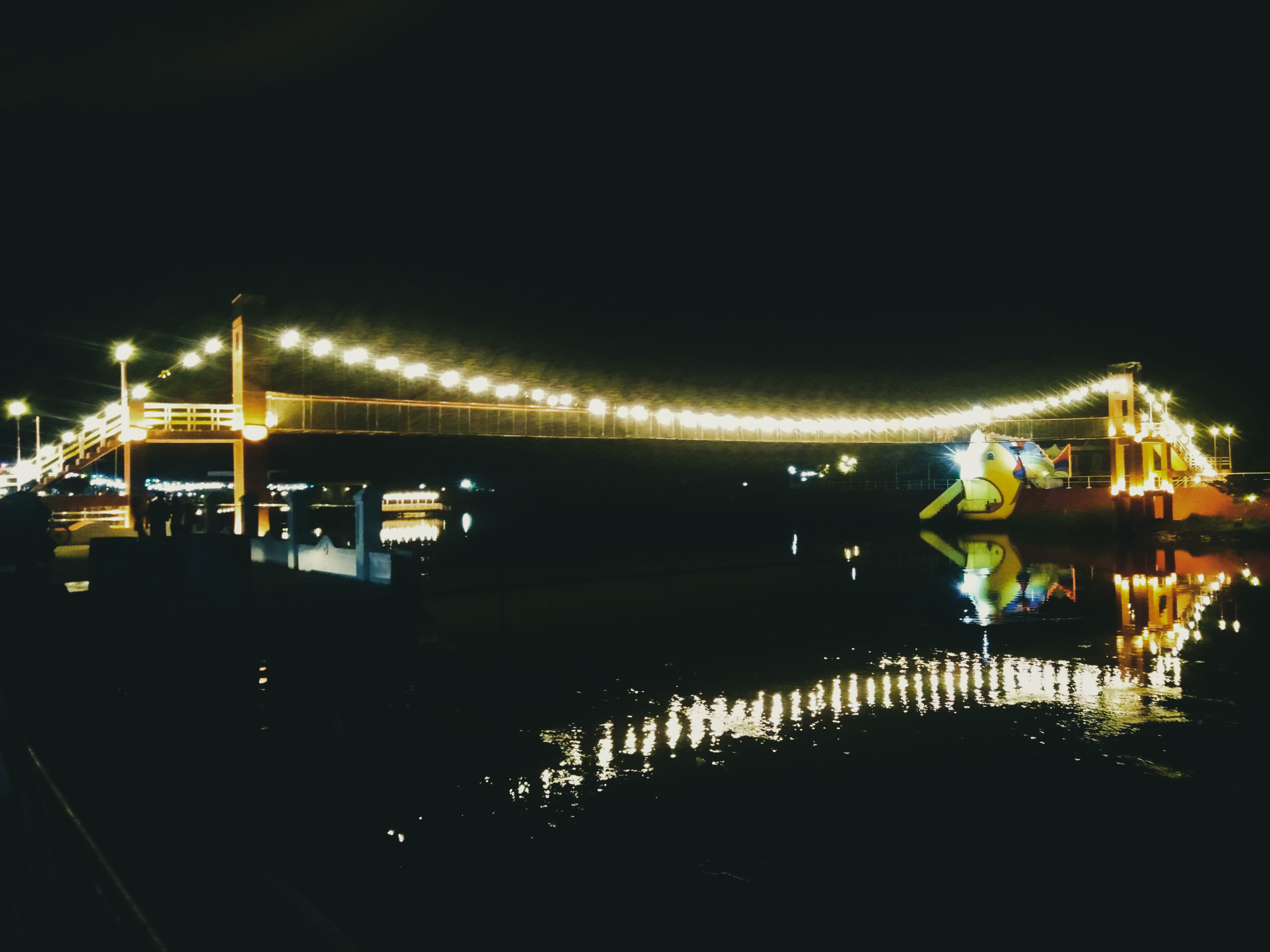
Camaligan Hanging Bridge

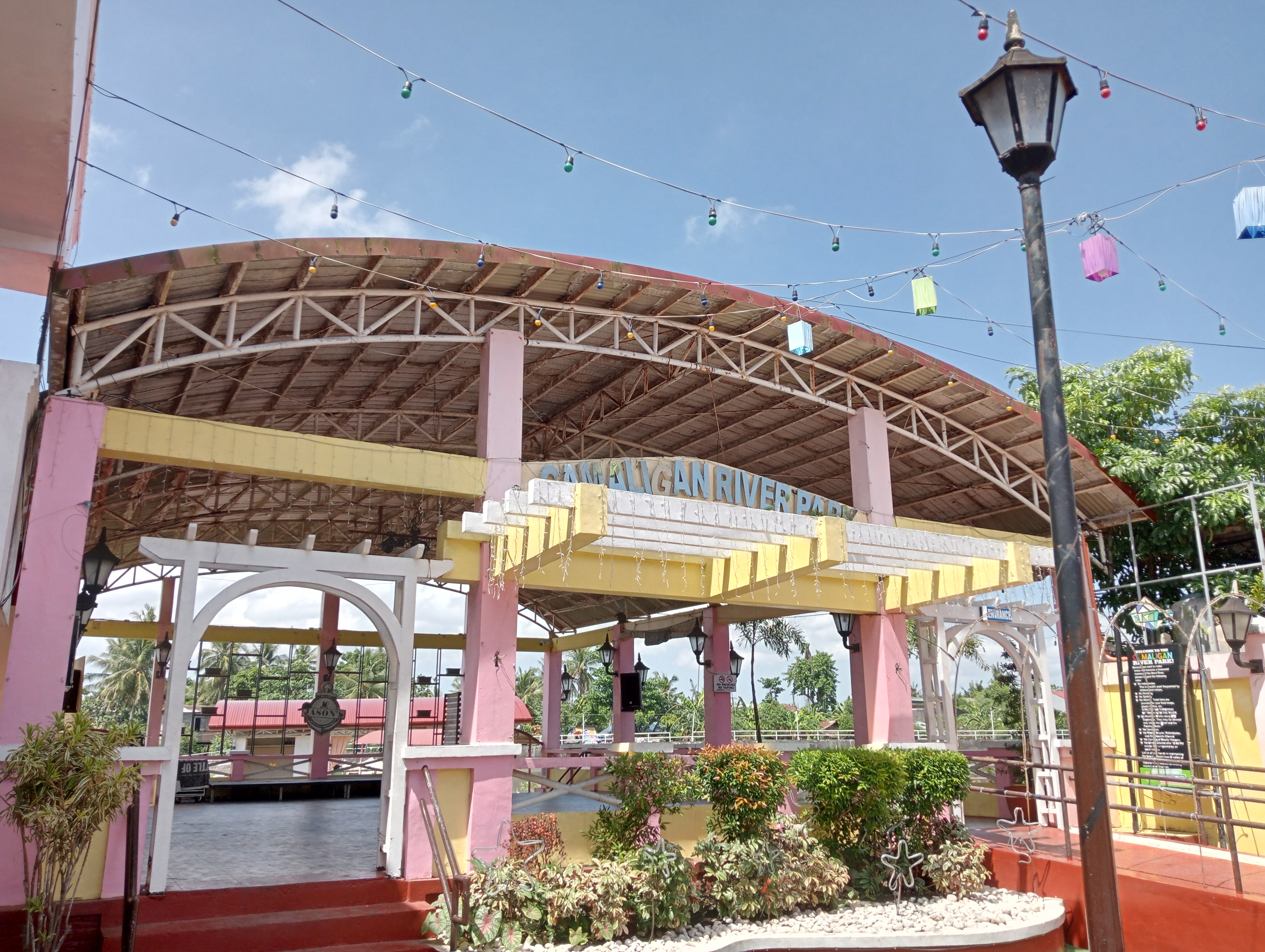
Camaligan River Park's Hall

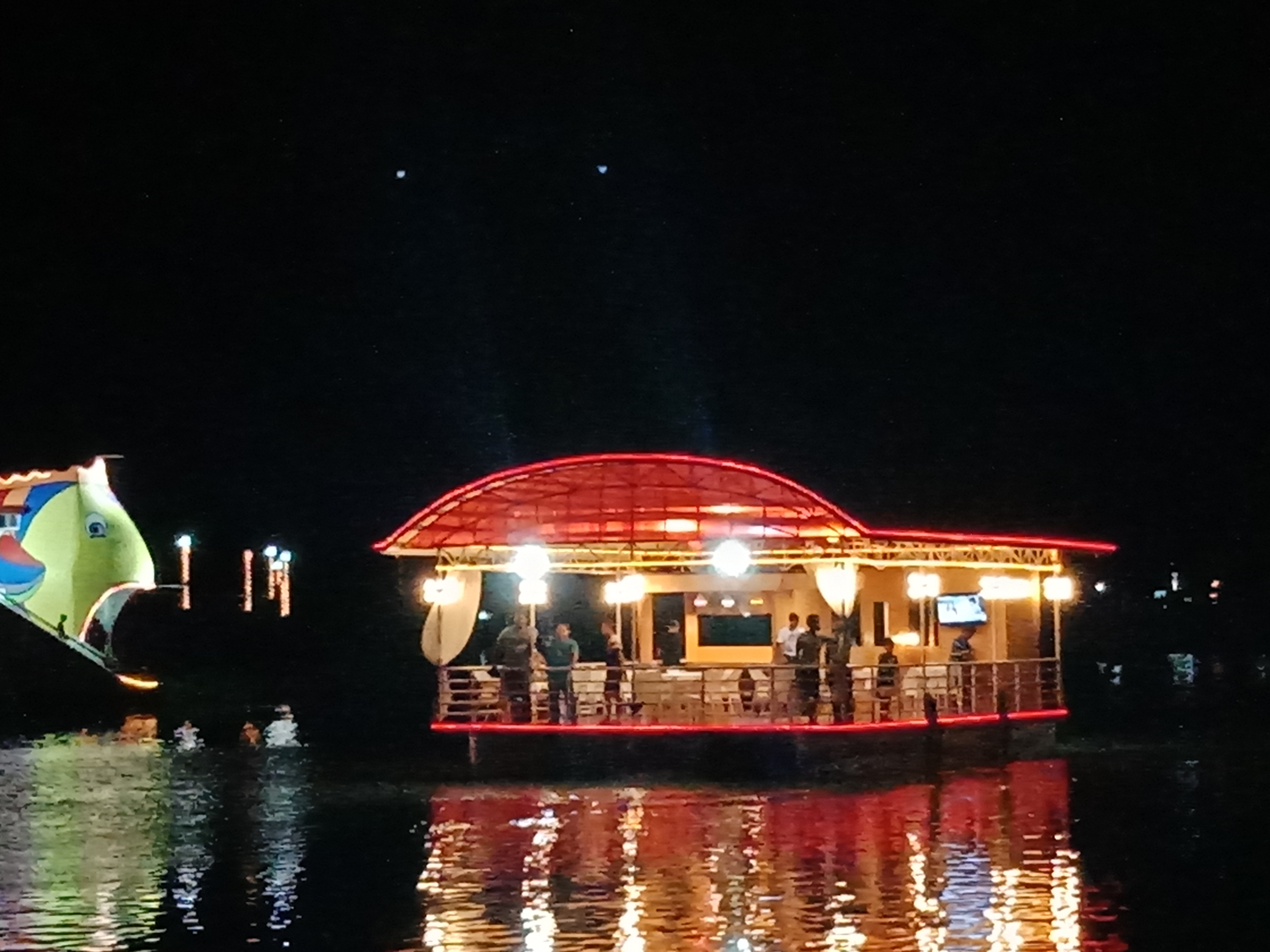
M/B Camaligan passing the Sira

== Archaeology ==
Camaligan is Bicol region's oldest known pre-colonial site, filled with numerous stone tools, jar fragments, shell middens, pig and deer bones, shark and ray cartilages, and other artifacts and biofacts. The site also homes to fifteen human skeletons of pre-colonial Ibalons. The site is so rare and vital as it does not contain any evidence of trade contact with China, Southeast Asian neighbors or South Asia, making it one of the very few pre-colonial sites in the Philippines with distinct Filipino artifacts and biofacts unaffected by outside trade. Both the University of the Philippines and University of California, Los Angeles have been pushing for the town's declaration as an "Important Archaeological Site." Scholars have also been pushing for the site's nomination in the UNESCO World Heritage List.

In a documentary made by GMA News TV, it was found that the artifacts and biofacts were not limited to the town proper. In fact, during a road-widening project conducted in September 2017 by the national government, hundreds of human bone fragments, animal bones, burial and ceremonial jar fragments, and stone tools were found after digging only the edges of the road. The documentary also found many Camaligueños to own artifacts they have found in their own land. Due to these findings, the town's reputation as a vital pre-colonial Ibalon archaeological site was solidified.

== Education ==
The Camaligan Schools District Office governs all educational institutions within the municipality. It oversees the management and operations of all private and public, from primary to secondary schools.

Camaligan has one high school, six elementary schools and thirteen preschools. At present, there is no existing tertiary school in the town.

=== Pre-schools ===
- Dugcal Day Care Center
- Gogon Day Care Center
- Hansel & Gretel Day Care Center
- Marupit Day Care Center
- San Francisco Day Care Center
- San Juan Day Care Center
- San Lucas Day Care Center
- San Mateo Day Care Center
- San Roque Day Care Center
- Sua Day Care Center
- Tampac Day Care Center
- Tarosanan Day Care Center

=== Primary and elementary schools ===
- Camaligan Central School
- Dugcal Elementary School
- Marupit Elementary School
- Petite L'e' Tudiant Learning Centre
- Purple Crayon Learning Center
- Rovalie Learning Center
- San Roque Elementary School
- Sua Elementary School
- Tarosanan-San Francisco Elementary School

=== Secondary school ===
- Camaligan National High School - the only high school in the town. The junior high school campus is located in barangay San Jose-San Pablo, while the senior high school is located in barangay Dugcal.

== Notable personalities ==
- Joyce Nocomura - crowned as Miss Philippines Water 2007.
