= Nueva Cáceres =

Colonial city in the Philippines

- City (1575–1901); Municipality (1901–1919)
- 1575–1919
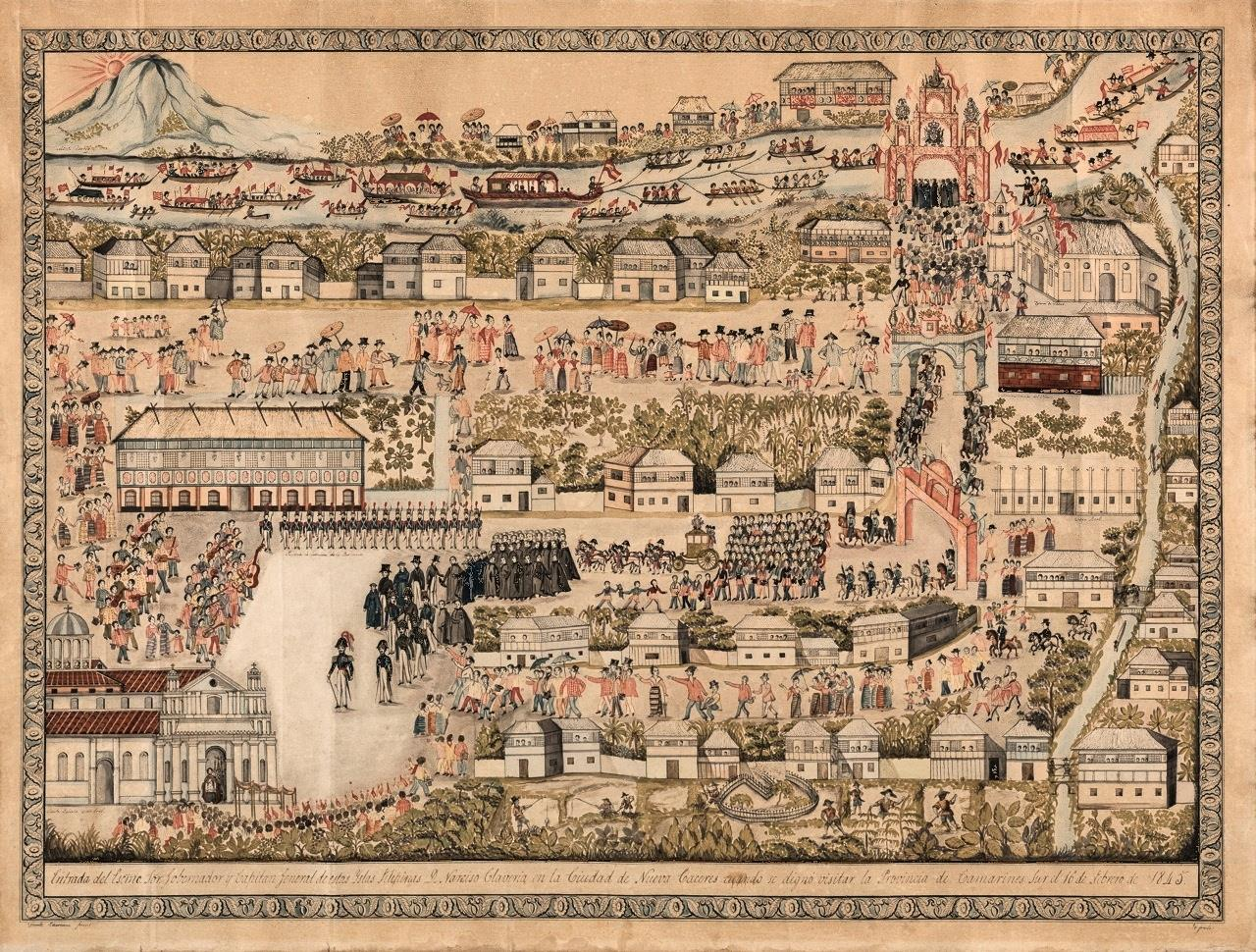
- Entry of Governor-General Narciso Clavería y Zaldúa into the city of Nueva Cáceres during his visit to the province of Camarines Sur, February 16, 1845.

- Location in Ambos Camarines.
- Historical era: Spanish colonial period American colonial period
  - Established: 1575
  - Disestablished: 1919
- Contained within
  - Country: Spanish Empire (1575–1901) ∟ Spanish East Indies; United States (1901–1919) ∟ Philippine Islands
  - Province: Ambos Camarines (1854–1857, 1893–1919); Camarines Sur (1829–1854, 1857–1893)
Succeeded by
Naga

Nueva Cáceres, officially the City of Nueva Cáceres (Spanish: Ciudad de Nueva Cáceres), was a Spanish colonial city in the Philippines, most of the territory of which is now a part of the city of Naga. Established by Captain Pedro de Sánchez in 1575, the city was named in honor of Governor-General Francisco de Sande, who was a native of Cáceres, Spain. In 1595, a papal bull issued by Pope Clement VIII created the See of Cáceres as a suffragan of the Archdiocese of Manila. The city was large and prosperous as the 1818 Spanish census recorded the area as having 5,739 families and a large number of 301 Spanish-Filipino families.

Nueva Cáceres was considered the center of economy and industry in the Bicol Region, and the city was made capital of the province of Camarines. When the province was dissolved twice in 1829 and 1857, the city then became the capital of Camarines Sur. From 1902 until 1908, some villages of Canaman and Camaligan were annexed to the city.

On September 18, 1898, corporals Elías Ángeles and Félix Plazo of the Guardia Civil planned a revolt to overthrow the Spanish colonial government and establish a republic. Their rebellion was successful, but short-lived. When American forces arrived in Nueva Cáceres, they encountered no resistance and replaced the republican government with their own.

In 1919, under the Insular Government, most of Nueva Cáceres became part of the municipality of Naga, with several villages in the northwest retroceded to their respective mother towns.
