= Naga River =

River in Camarines Sur, Philippines

Naga River Ilog Naga (Filipino)
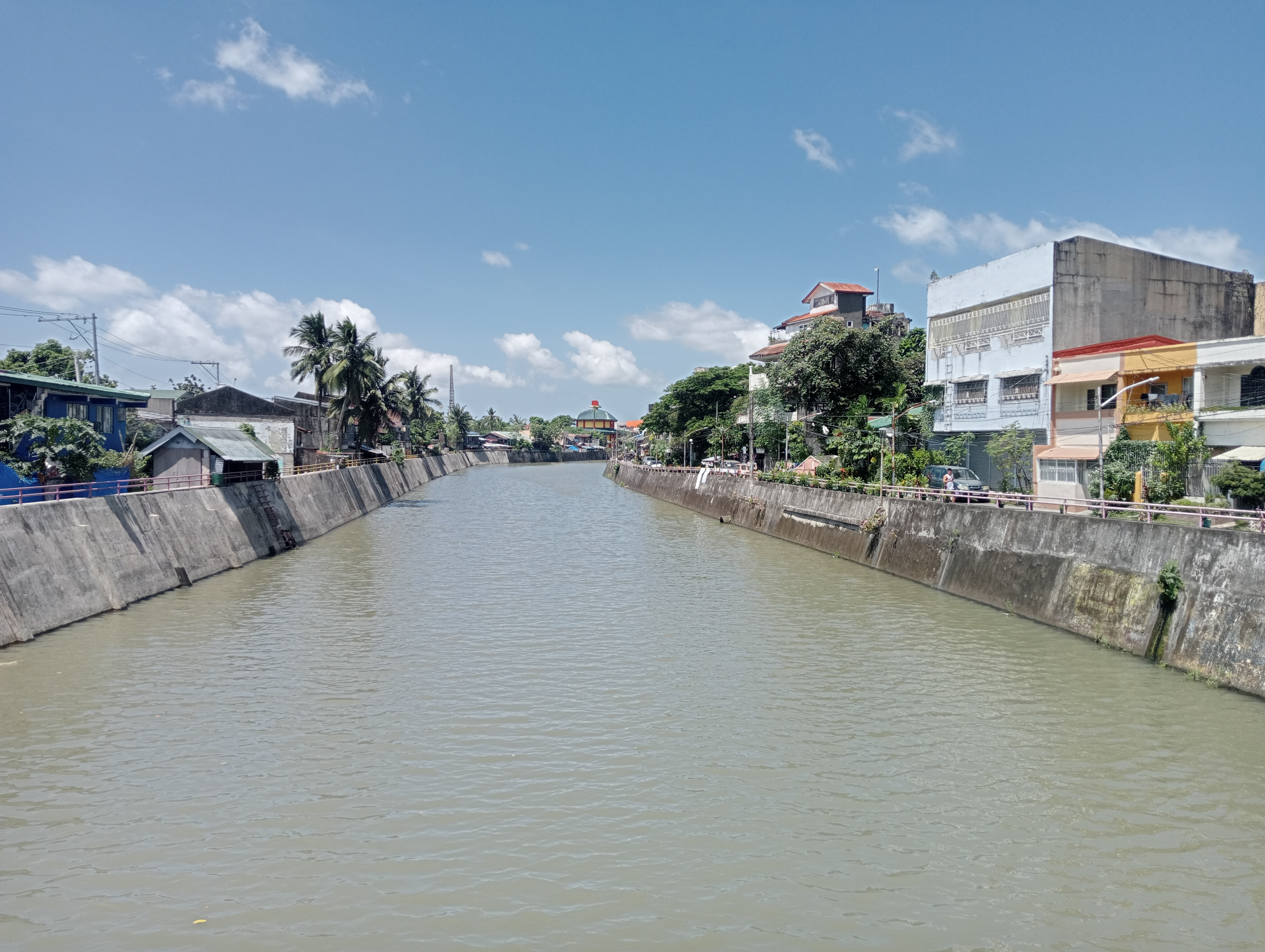

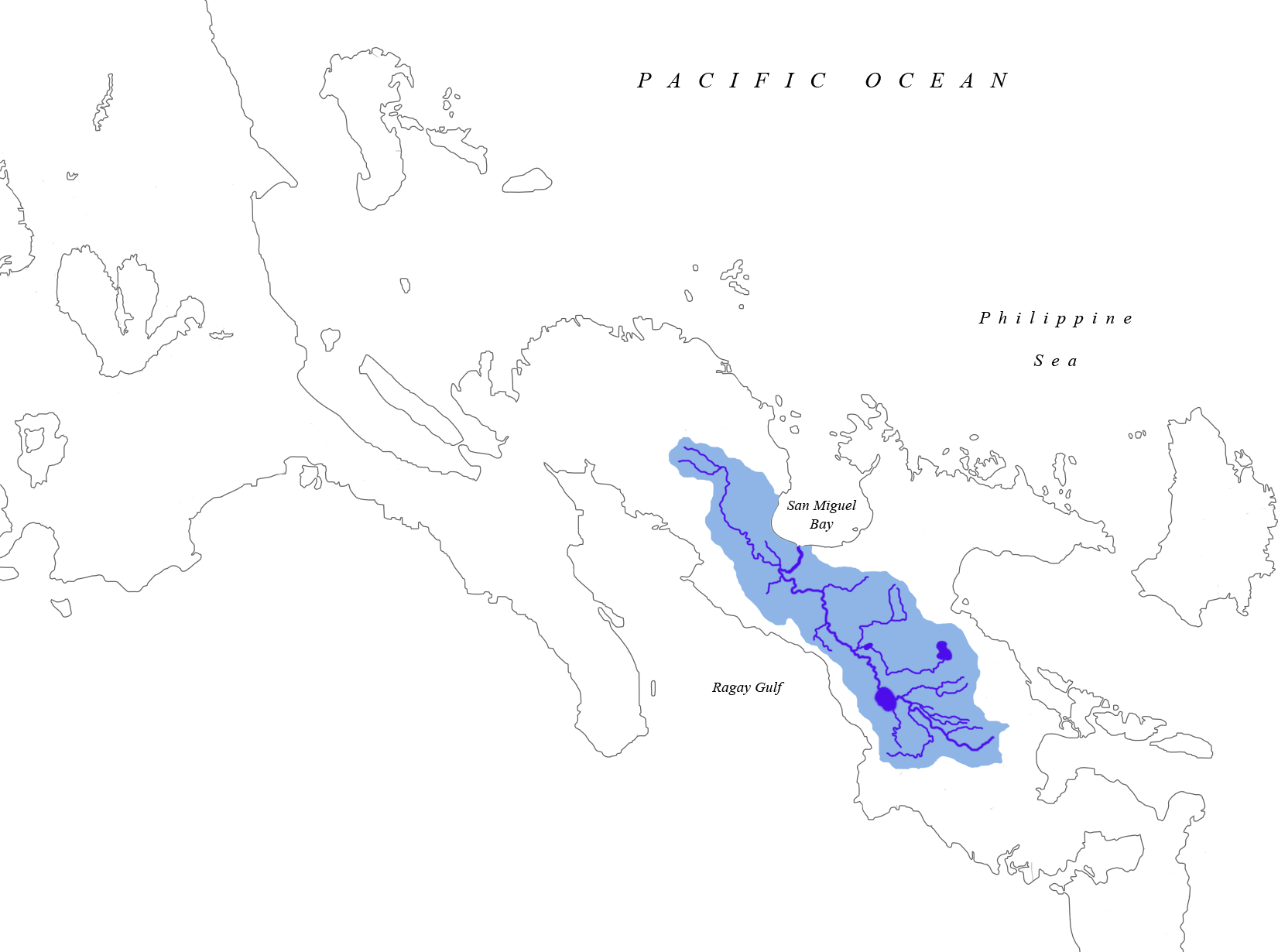
- Bicol River drainage area

- Bicol River mouth Naga River (Philippines)
- Native name: Salog Naga (Central Bikol)

Location
- Country: Philippines
- Region: Bicol Region
- Province: Camarines Sur
- City: Naga

Physical characteristics
- Source
  - location: Mount Isarog, Bicol Region
- Mouth
  - location: Bicol River
  - coordinates: 13°37′02″N 123°10′50″E
- Discharge
  - location: San Miguel Bay (when the sea level is low)

Basin features
- Progression: Naga–Bicol

The Naga River (Central Bicol: Salog Naga) is a river in Naga, Camarines Sur, Philippines. It is an extension of the Bicol River.

== Naga River Day ==
The first Naga River Day, dubbed Aldaw kan Salog nin Buhay (Day of the River of Life), was celebrated on March 8, 2014, in Naga. The event was established through Mayoral Proclamation No. 2014-002 which declares every second Saturday of March as Naga River Day. Its aim is to highlight the importance of the Naga River, particularly its role in the history and culture of the city. It also seeks to encourage Naga citizens to take responsibility for the river's cleanliness.
