= Libmanan River =

River in Camarines Sur, Philippines

- Libmanan River mouth Libmanan River (Philippines)
- Native name: Salog Libmanan (Central Bikol)

Location
- Country: Philippines
- Region: Bicol Region
- Province: Camarines Sur

Physical characteristics
- Source
  - elevation: 4 m (13 ft)
- Mouth: Bicol River
  - location: Libmanan, Camarines Sur, Bicol Region
  - coordinates: 13°41′23″N 123°06′54″E
- Discharge
  - location: San Miguel Bay (when the sea level is low)

Libmanan River is a major waterway in the province of Camarines Sur in the Bicol Region of the Philippines that flows into San Miguel Bay. Approximately 83 kilometers in length, it acts as a left tributary and major system feeding into the Bicol River basin. Originating from the slopes of Mount Labo, the river flows southeast, eventually joining the Bicol River in the town of Libmanan.

In 2021, the river was listed among the top plastic waste carriers in the world.
