= Bicol River =

River in Camarines Sur, Philippines

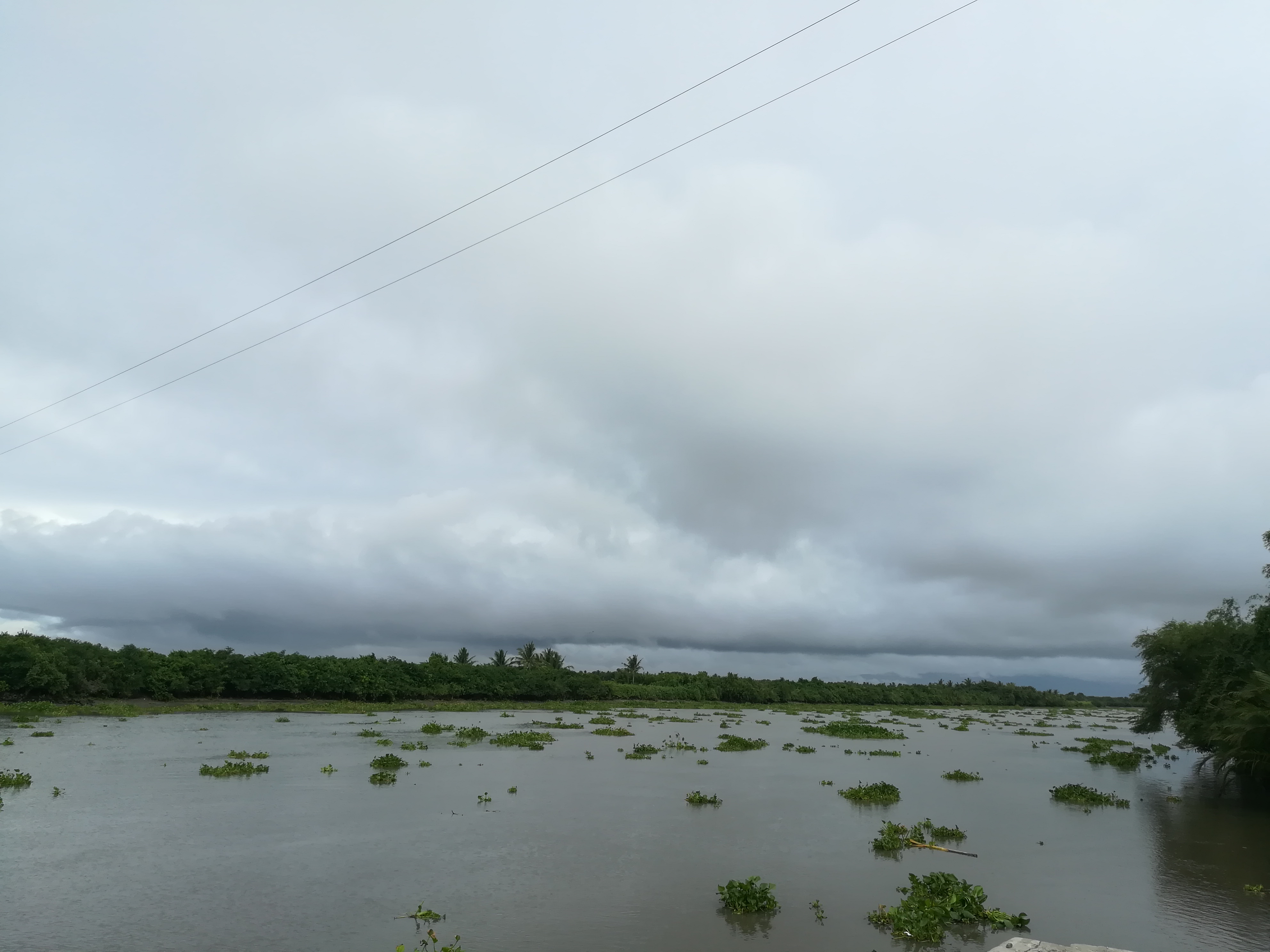

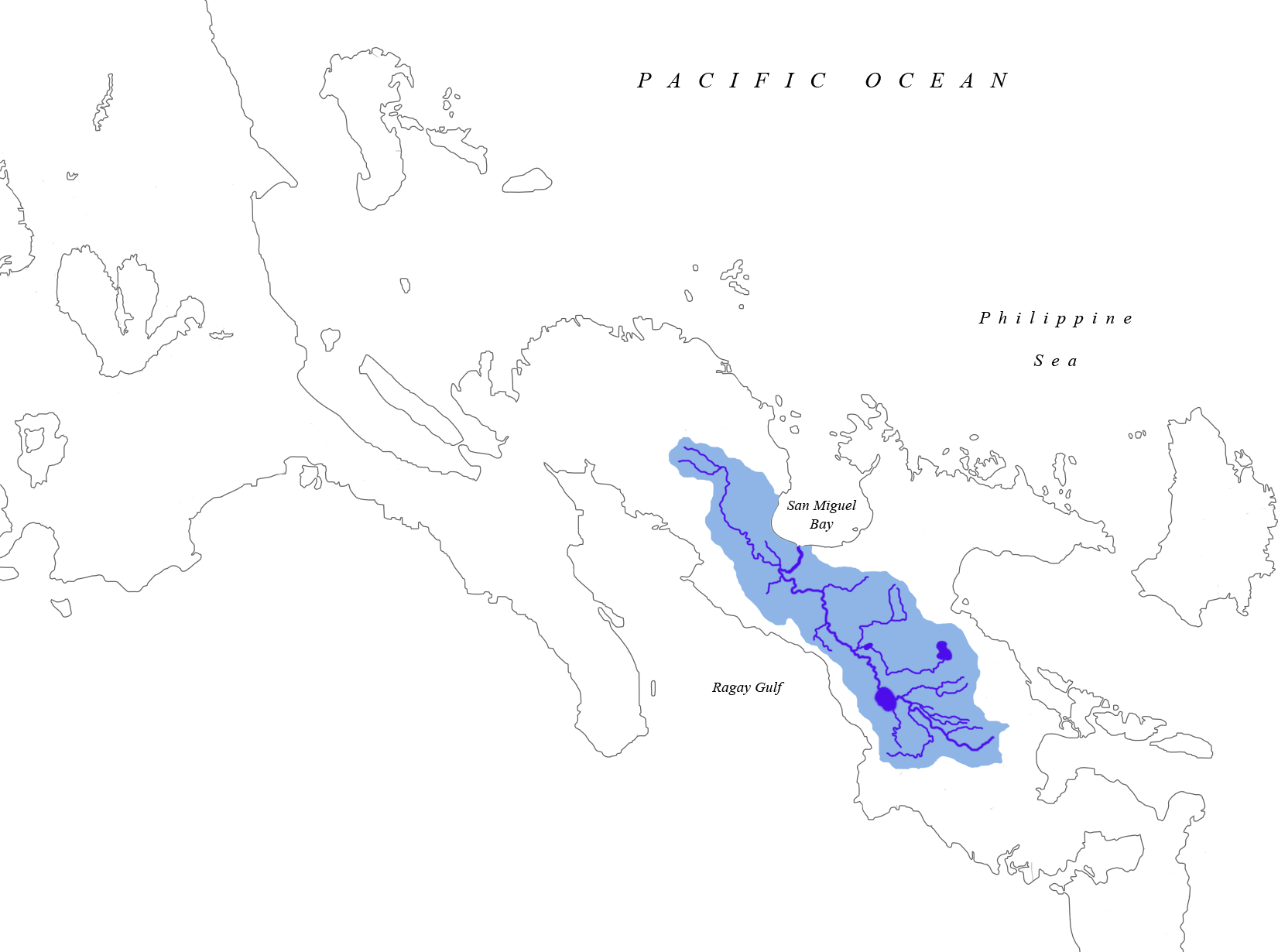
- Bicol River drainage area

- Bicol River mouth Bicol River (Philippines)
- Native name: Salog Bikol (Central Bikol)

Location
- Country: Philippines
- Region: Bicol Region
- Province: Camarines Sur
- Cities: Naga; Iriga

Physical characteristics
- Source: Lake Bato
  - location: Bato, Camarines Sur and Libon, Albay, Bicol Region
  - coordinates: 13°19′55″N 123°21′32″E
  - elevation: 6 m (20 ft)
- Mouth
  - location: Between Cabusao and Calabanga, Camarines Sur, Bicol Region
  - coordinates: 13°40′18″N 123°06′39″E
  - elevation: 0 m (0 ft)
- Length: 94 km (58 mi)
- Basin size: 3,770 km^{2} (1,460 sq mi)
- Discharge
  - location: San Miguel Bay (when the sea level is low)
  - average: 165 m^{3}/s (5,800 cu ft/s)
  - minimum: 123 m^{3}/s (4,300 cu ft/s)
  - maximum: 205 m^{3}/s (7,200 cu ft/s)

Basin features
- Tributaries
  - left: Libmanan River; Sipocot River
  - right: Naga River; Yabu River

The Bicol River is the eighth largest river in the Philippines in terms of drainage basin size with an estimated catchment area of 3,770 square kilometres (1,460 sq mi). The river drains a large part of Bicol Peninsula of the southeastern part of the island of Luzon and passes through Camarines Sur province.

The river starts from Lake Bato, 6 metres (20 ft) above sea level, and flows 94 kilometres (58 mi) downstream to its estuarine mouth at San Miguel Bay. It passes through Naga City, the alluvial and coastal plains of the vast Bicol Valley, an elongated, northwesterly trending depression in the Bicol Region, which contains alluvial plains to the coastal plain. Average slope within the river's drainage basin is 0.006%.

The basin has an influence area of 10,058 square kilometres (3,883 sq mi) including its drainage basin. It lies between 13°0 to 14°N and 123°0 and 124°0 E. It is extensively a coastal flood plain.

== Geology and geomorphology ==
The Bicol River is bounded on the northeast by the Bicol Cordillera, which consists of a chain of volcanic mountains including Mount Iriga, Mount Malinao, Mount Masaraga and Mount Mayon. On the southwestern side lie the Ragay Hills, which consists of folded and faulted sedimentary formations including limestones, siltstones, conglomerates and shale. In between these higher areas lies the Bicol plain, which is composed of thick alluvial deposits of sand silt and clay.

The main geo-morphological features found in the area include the estuarine plain, a river flood plain, the piedmont plain and the valleys of incised creeks. The estuarine plain is level to nearly level and consists of fine fluvial-marine deposits over sandy layers with marine shells. The fluvial marine deposits are usually saline at depths of approximately 1 metre (3 ft 3 in) and includes depresses areas along the Bicol River. The river floodplain is made up of mixed alluvium. The piedmont plain on the fringe of the Ragay Hills consists of fine alluvium clay and reworked colluviums.

== Climate ==
The climate is influenced by the Northeast Monsoon winds and the Pacific trade winds. These monsoon winds create the low pressure area in the Pacific Ocean, resulting in tropical cyclones that affect the area in November and December.

Rainfall occurs throughout the year with low rainfall between January and May and high rainfall between June and December. In the lower basin, mean annual rainfall ranges between 1,850 and 2,300 millimetres (73 and 91 in). The main factors influencing rainfall are the air streams, the Intertropical Convergence Zone and topography.

The mean temperatures are high throughout the year with the daily mean temperatures in the range of 24.1 to 28.1 °C (75.4 to 82.6 °F) and an annual mean temperature of 27 °C (81 °F).

== Crossings ==
This is listed from mouth to source.

1. Malbong Hanging Bridge (Gainza, Camarines Sur)
2. Old Mabolo Bridge (Felix Plazo Street, Naga–Milaor boundary)
3. Unnamed Philippine National Railways bridge, Naga–Milaor boundary
4. Mabolo Bridge ( AH 26 (N1) (Pan-Philippine Highway), Naga–Milaor boundary)
5. FVR Bridge I (Milaor, Camarines Sur)
6. Unnamed bridge in Bula, Camarines Sur
7. Sto. Domingo Bridge (Nabua–Balatan Road, Nabua, Camarines Sur)
