= Calabanga =

Municipality in Camarines Sur, Philippines

- Municipality
- Municipality of Calabanga
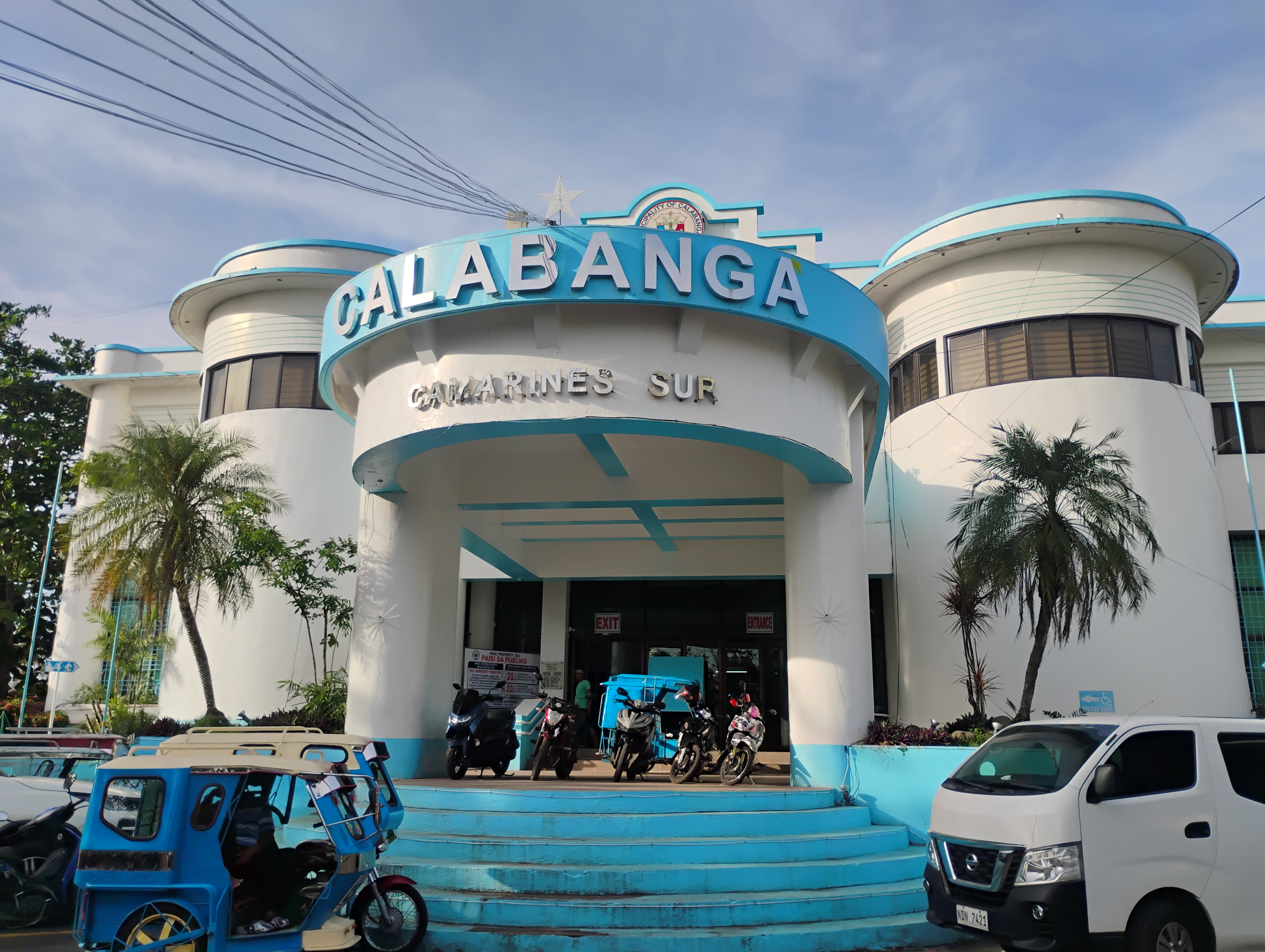
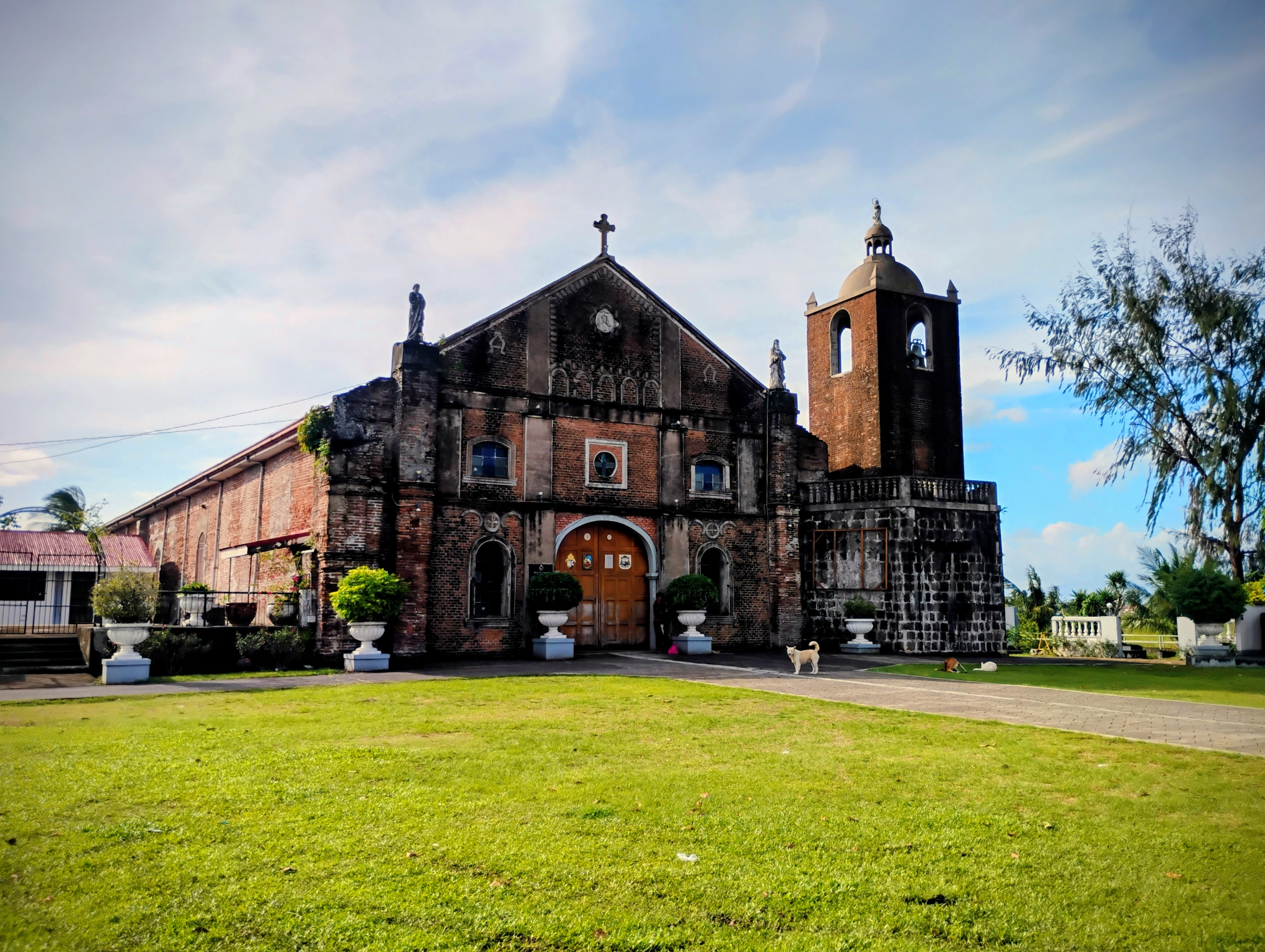
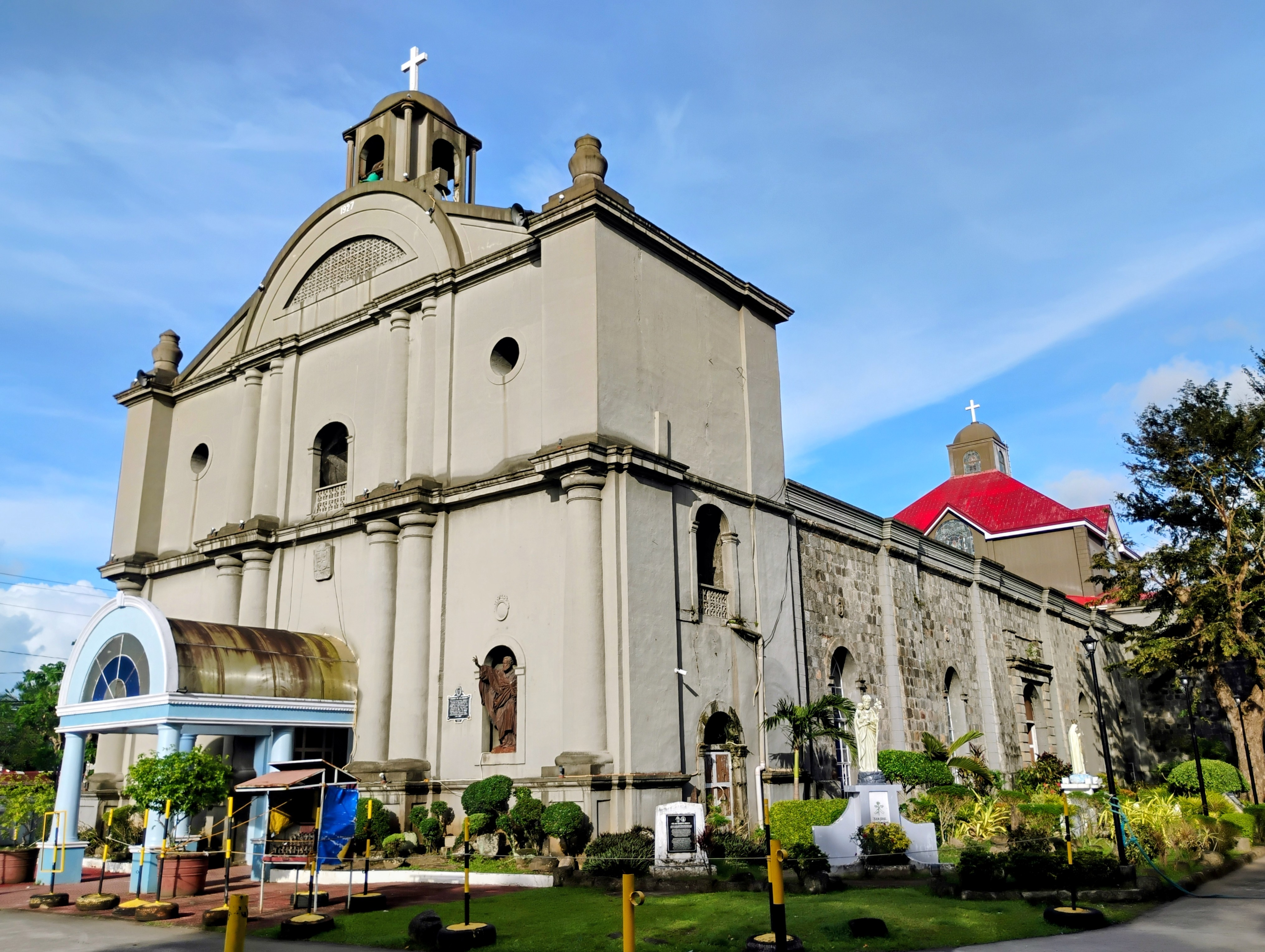
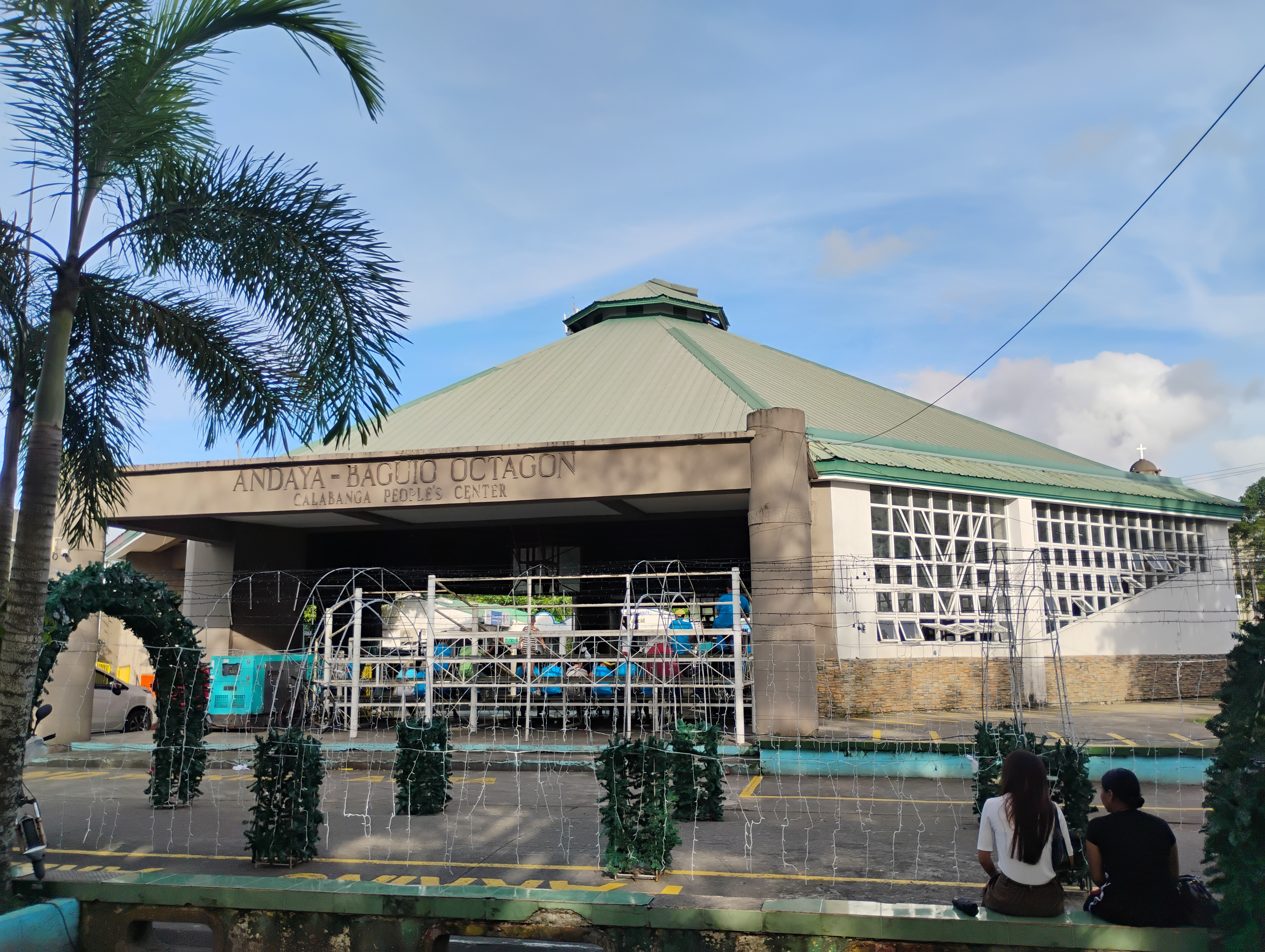
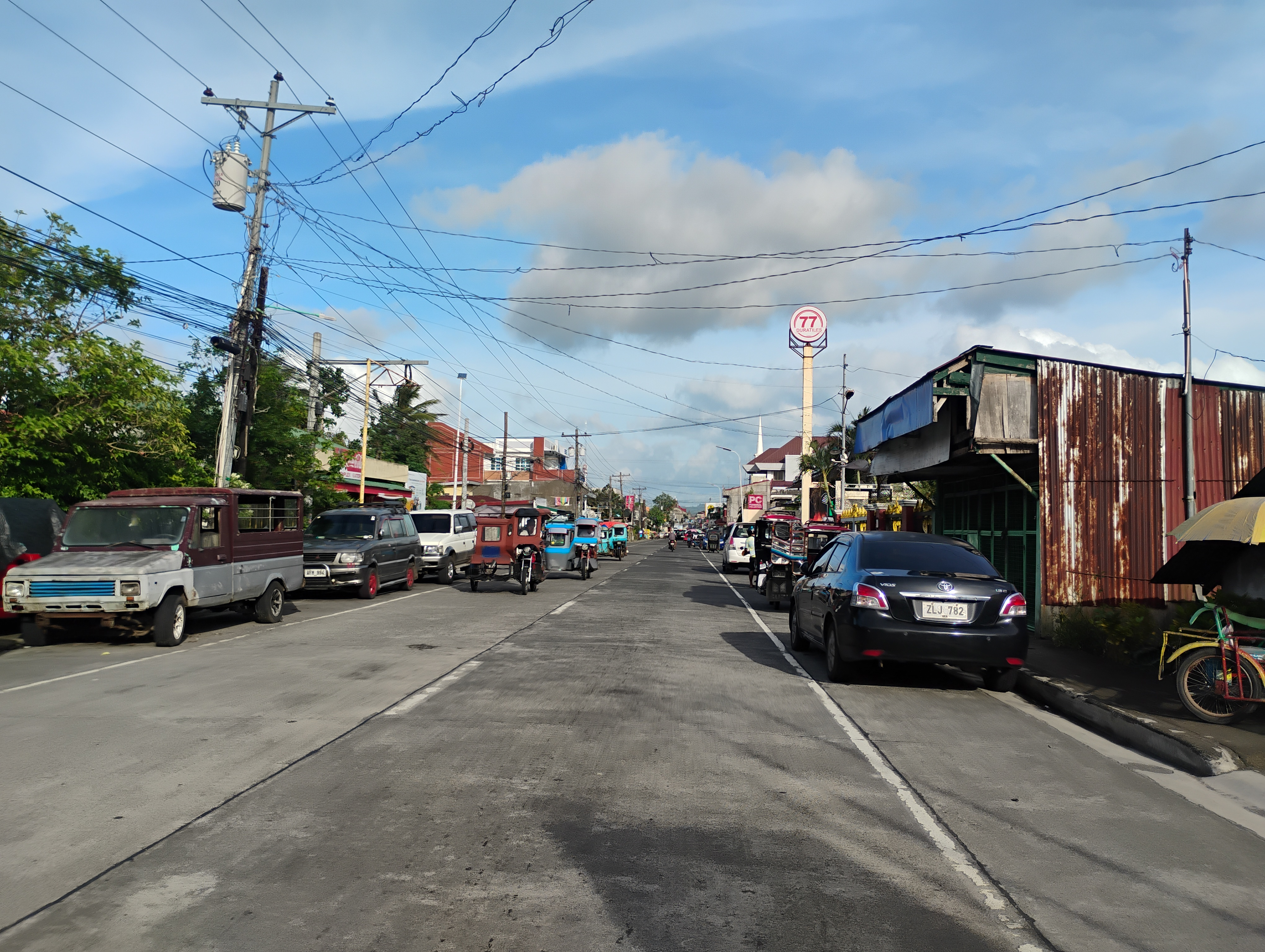
- Calabanga Municipal Hall Our Lady of the Immaculate Conception Parish Church Our Lady of La Porteria Parish Church Calabanga People's Center Calabanga Town Proper

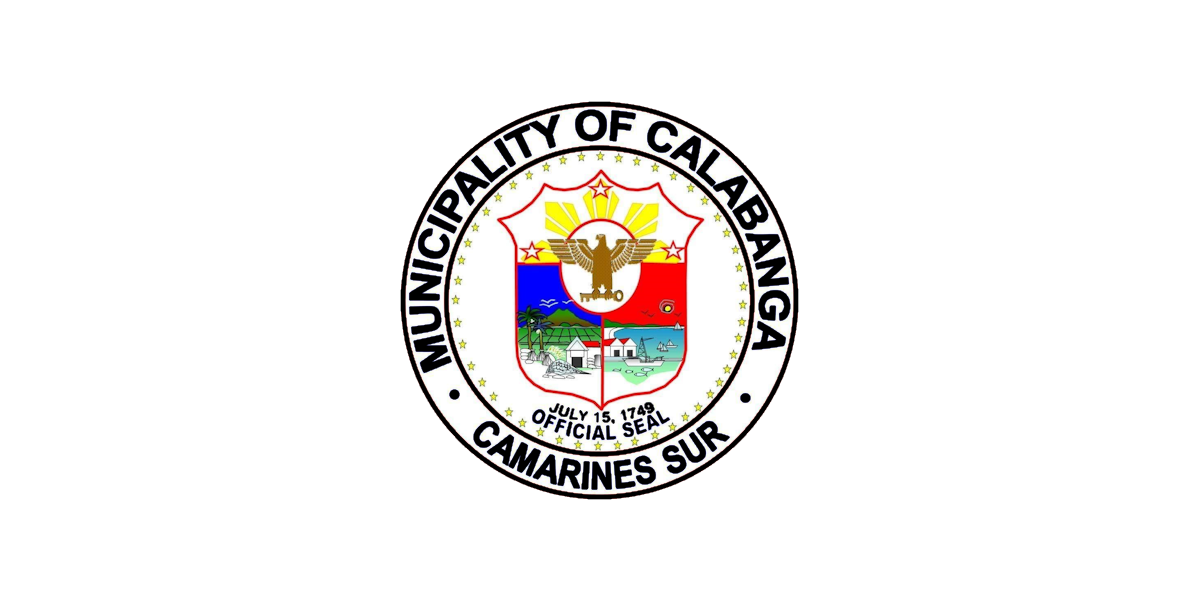
- Flag
- Nickname: The True Heart of CamSur
- Motto: Saro sa Pagtubod, Saro sa Pag-asenso! (English: One Faith, One Progress!)
- Anthem: Calabanga March
- Map of Camarines Sur with Calabanga highlighted
- Interactive map of Calabanga
- Location within the Philippines
- Coordinates: 13°42′32″N 123°12′58″E
- Country: Philippines
- Region: Bicol Region
- Province: Camarines Sur
- District: 3rd district
- Founded: 1578 (Quipayo); 1756 (Calabanga)
- Barangays: 48 (see Barangays)

Government
  - Type: Sangguniang Bayan
  - Mayor: Philip B. Dumalasa
  - Vice Mayor: Victor B. De Villa
  - Representative: Nelson S. Legacion
  - Municipal Council: Members: Sherwin Francis O. Mendoza; Henrico Rey B. Delos Santos; Martin B. Dumalasa; Jan Oliver I. Tabinas; Ruben H. Medroso III; Michael E. Bordado; John Paul S. Sta Ana; Cielito G. Hilado
  - Electorate: 56,728 voters (2025)

Area
  - Total: 163.80 km^{2} (63.24 sq mi)
- Elevation: 13 m (43 ft)
- Highest elevation: 94 m (308 ft)
- Lowest elevation: −2 m (−6.6 ft)

Population (2024 census)
  - Total: 88,918
  - Density: 542.84/km^{2} (1,406.0/sq mi)
  - Households: 19,444

Economy
  - Income class: 1st municipal income class
  - Poverty incidence: 26.99% (2023)
  - Revenue: ₱ 340 million (2024)
  - Assets: ₱ 834.9 million (2024)
  - Expenditure: ₱ 306.4 million (2024)
  - Liabilities: ₱ 248.3 million (2024)

Service provider
  - Electricity: Camarines Sur 2 Electric Cooperative (CASURECO 2)
- Time zone: UTC+8 (PST)
- ZIP code: 4405
- PSGC: 0501708000
- IDD : area code: +63 (0)54
- Native languages: Central Bikol; Tagalog
- Website: www.calabanga.gov.ph

Calabanga, officially the Municipality of Calabanga (Central Bikol: Banwaan kan Calabanga; Tagalog: Bayan ng Calabanga), is a municipality in the province of Camarines Sur, Philippines. According to the 2024 census, it has a population of 88,918 people.

== History ==
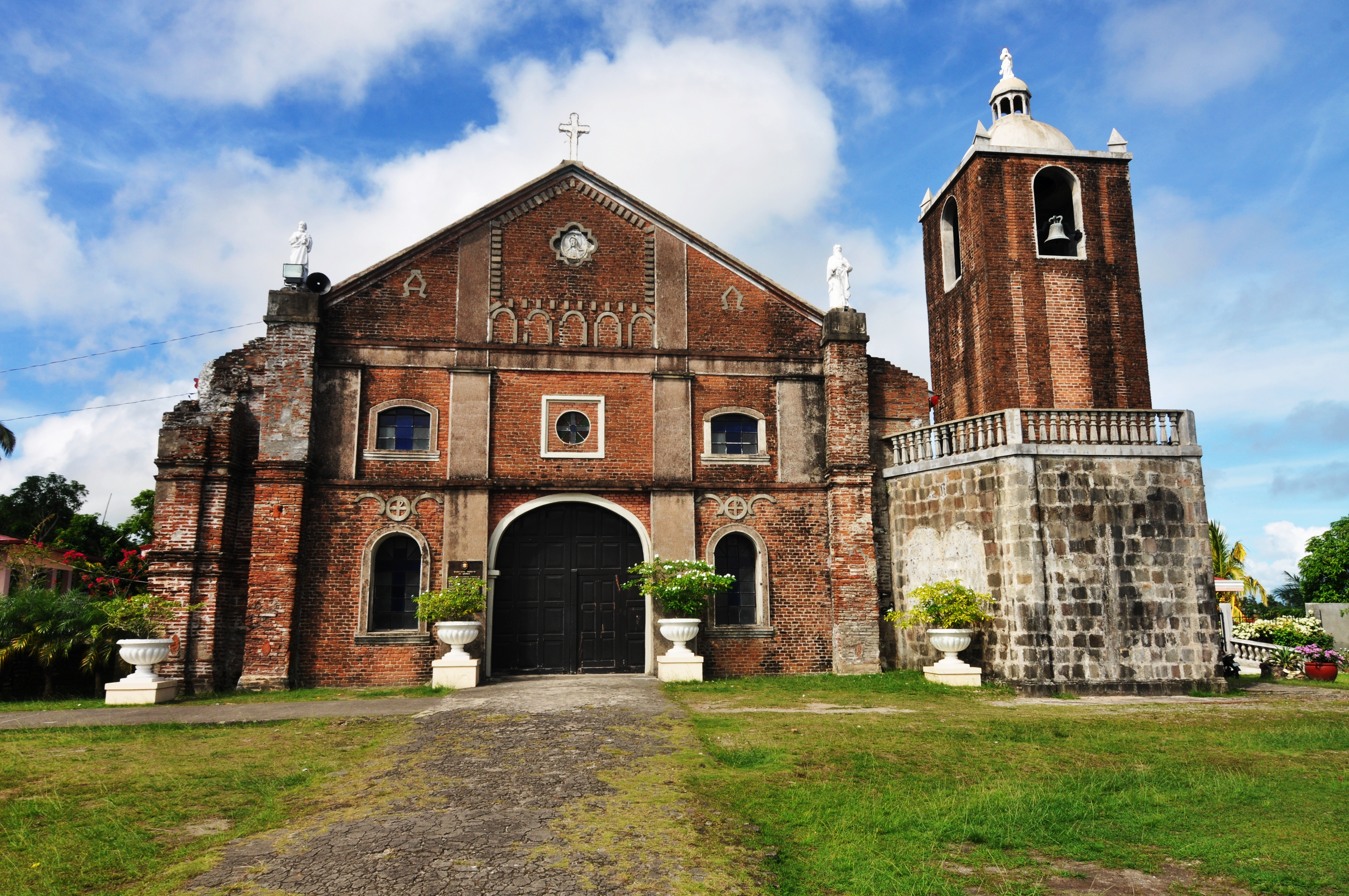
Quipayo Church

In 1578 when the head Mission of Quipayo was established, Calabanga was either a visita or a barrio. At that time, the place had vast forests and swamps and an abundance of wildlife. Others say, it derived its name from the Bicol word “Calabangan”, the plural term of “labang” or “litag”, meaning a kind of snare for catching wild animals. Another legend says that Calabanga originated from the word “Calagbangan” meaning the wide, long, and straight street spanning from the church through the poblacion, east to west, called locally as “calabaan” or “calacbangan”.

Calabanga became known with 400 tributes. On July 15, 1749, it was separated from Quipayo by virtue of the approval of Don Fray Joan de Arechera, Bishop-Elect of Nueva Segovia of the Commissary of the King. The approval was base from a petition signed and filed by 37 Calabangueños on April 28, 1749, for the territory to be conveniently administered as a separate town

By that period, there were already 2 visitas, visita de Cagapad and visita de Hinarijan and 12 barrios. The barrios were san Antonio, San Vicente, Santa Catalina, Nuestra Señora de Salud, San Lucas, San Miguel, Santa Isabel, Nuestra Señora del Carmen, San Roque, San Pablo, San Jose (now Balongay) and Belen.

Quipayo or Calabanga used to encompass Tinambak (Tinambac), Masirum (Siruma), Bombon, Magarao, Cabusao, and Piglabanan (Libmanan). Libmanan is the oldest that was established in 1580 while Bombon was the last being separated and created a town in 1949.

== Geography ==
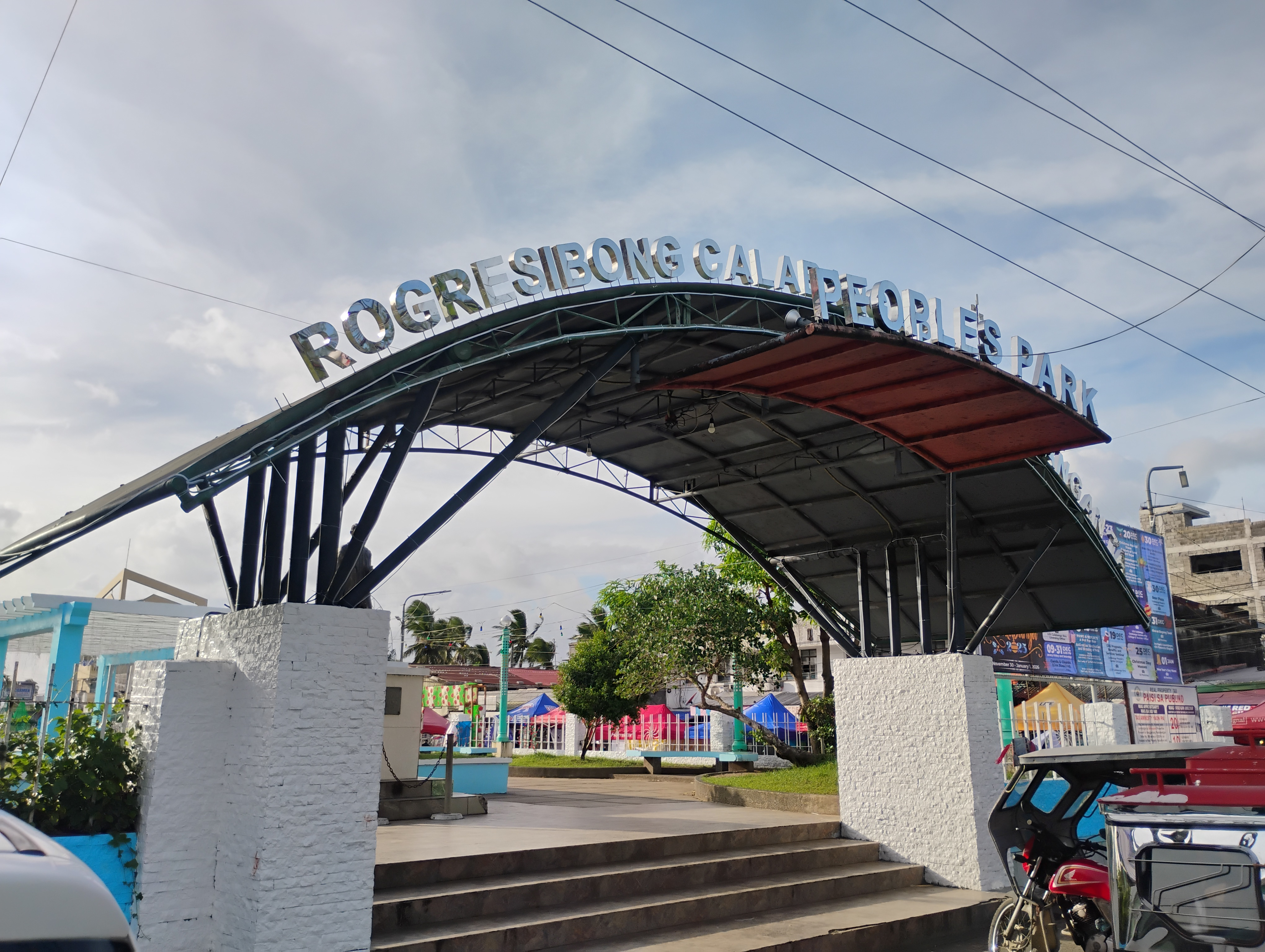
Calabanga People's Park

Calabanga has a land area of 16,380 hectares (40,500 acres), which constitutes 3.1% of the Camarines Sur's land area. It is bounded on the west by the Bicol River and the municipality of Cabusao; on the south by the municipality of Bombon and Naga City; on the east by the forest lands of Mount Isarog, the Tigman River and each tributary forming the natural boundary and the municipality of Tinambac; on the north by the fishing grounds of San Miguel Bay, and the municipalities of Sipocot, Basud and Mercedes.

=== Barangays ===
Calabanga is politically subdivided into 48 barangays. Each barangay consists of puroks and some have sitios.

Currently, there are 14 of which located within the urban area while the remaining 34 barangays are considered to be rural areas. Of these, 11 are coastal barangays and 3 are highly urbanized barangays.

Calabanga is divided into six areas: West Coast, Harbour, East Coast, Poblacion, Highland, and Quipayo.

- Balatasan
- Balombon
- Balongay
- Belen
- Bigaas
- Binanuaanan Grande
- Binanuaanan Pequeño
- Binaliw
- Bonot-Santa Rosa
- Burabod
- Cabanbanan
- Cagsao
- Camuning
- Comaguingking
- Del Carmen (Pob.)
- Dominorog
- Fabrica
- Harubay
- La Purisima (Quipayo)
- Lugsad
- Manguiring
- Pagatpat
- Paolbo
- Pinada
- Punta Tarawal
- Quinale
- Sabang
- Salvacion-Baybay
- San Antonio Poblacion
- San Antonio (Quipayo)
- San Bernardino
- San Francisco
- San Isidro
- San Lucas
- San Miguel (Pob.)
- San Pablo
- San Roque
- San Vicente (Pob.)
- Santa Cruz Poblacion
- Santa Cruz Ratay
- Santa Isabel (Pob.)
- Santa Salud (Pob.)
- Santo Domingo
- Santo Niño (Quipayo)
- Siba-o
- Sibobo
- Sogod
- Tomagodtod

=== Climate ===
Climate data for Calabanga, Camarines Sur
Month	Jan	Feb	Mar	Apr	May	Jun	Jul	Aug	Sep	Oct	Nov	Dec	Year
Mean daily maximum °C (°F)	32 (90)	31 (88)	34 (93)	36 (97)	37 (99)	37 (99)	36 (97)	34 (93)	35 (95)	34 (93)	33 (91)	32 (90)	34 (94)
Mean daily minimum °C (°F)	27 (81)	27 (81)	29 (84)	31 (88)	32 (90)	32 (90)	31 (88)	30 (86)	30 (86)	29 (84)	28 (82)	28 (82)	30 (85)
Average precipitation mm (inches)	39.34 (1.55)	68.7 (2.70)	26.73 (1.05)	66.19 (2.61)	84.49 (3.33)	178.89 (7.04)	244.27 (9.62)	188.3 (7.41)	160.98 (6.34)	445 (17.5)	135.5 (5.33)	367.8 (14.48)	2,006.19 (78.96)
Average rainy days	16	18	13	15	23	28	30	24	26	27	25	29	274
Source: World Weather Online (Use with caution: this is modeled/calculated data, not measured locally.)

=== Land protection ===
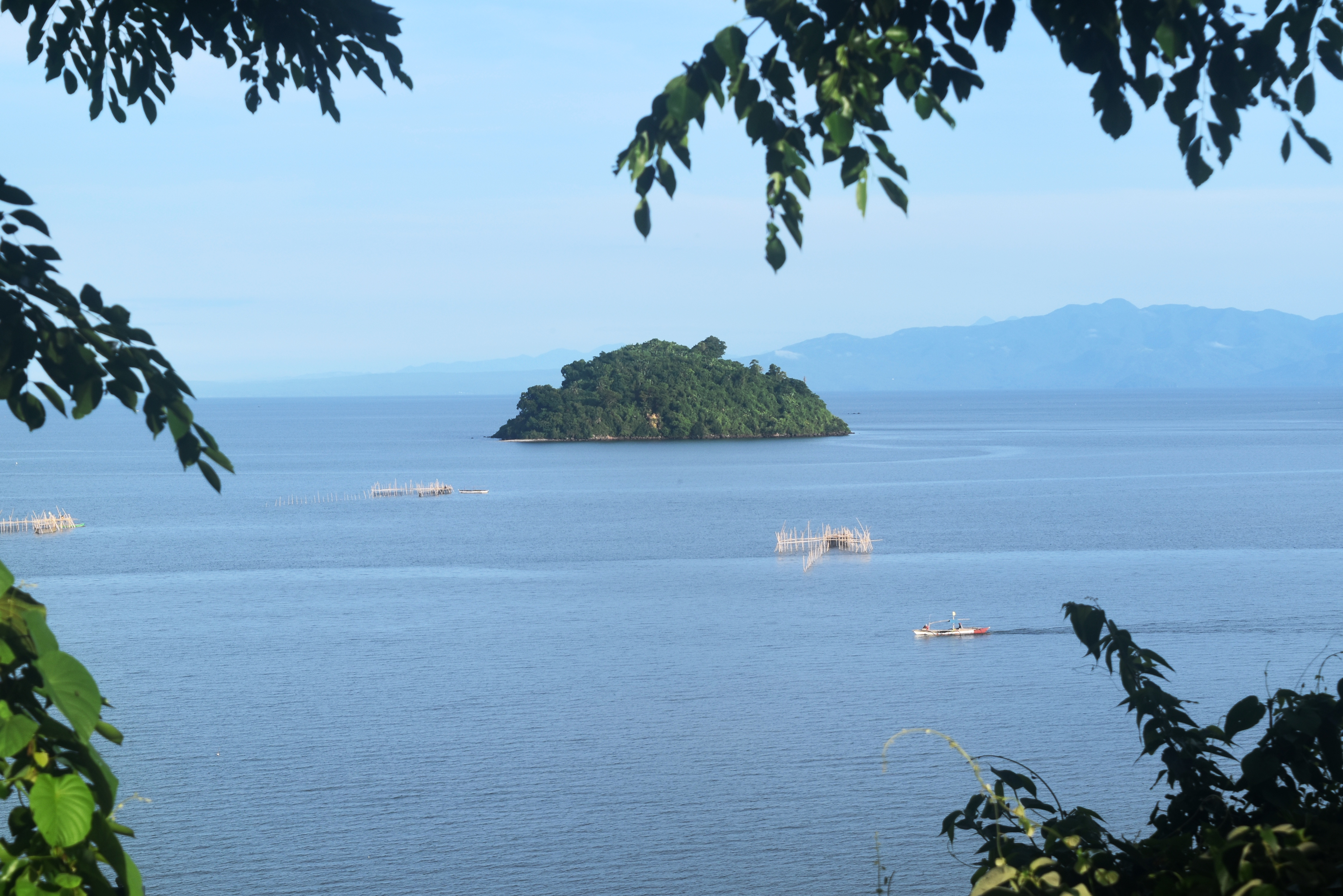
Cabgan Island

Eastern Calabanga which supplies water to the municipality and is within Mount Isarog, was declared as a protected landscape in 2018 by Former Mayor Eduardo Severo. As a protected land area, construction of houses and establishments are prohibited. Construction of subdivisions are also prohibited in the irrigated areas of Calabanga.

=== Soil and water resources ===
There are six soil types that could be found in the Municipality. These are the (1) Hydrosol which is dominant along the Bicol River covering parts of Barangays Balongay, San Bernardino and Punta Tarawal; (2) Balong Clay; (3) Pili Clay Loam; (4) Tigaon Clay which covers the poblacion; (5) Annan Clay Loam which could be found toward the direction of Tinambac and (6) Mountain Soil in the Mt. Isarog area.

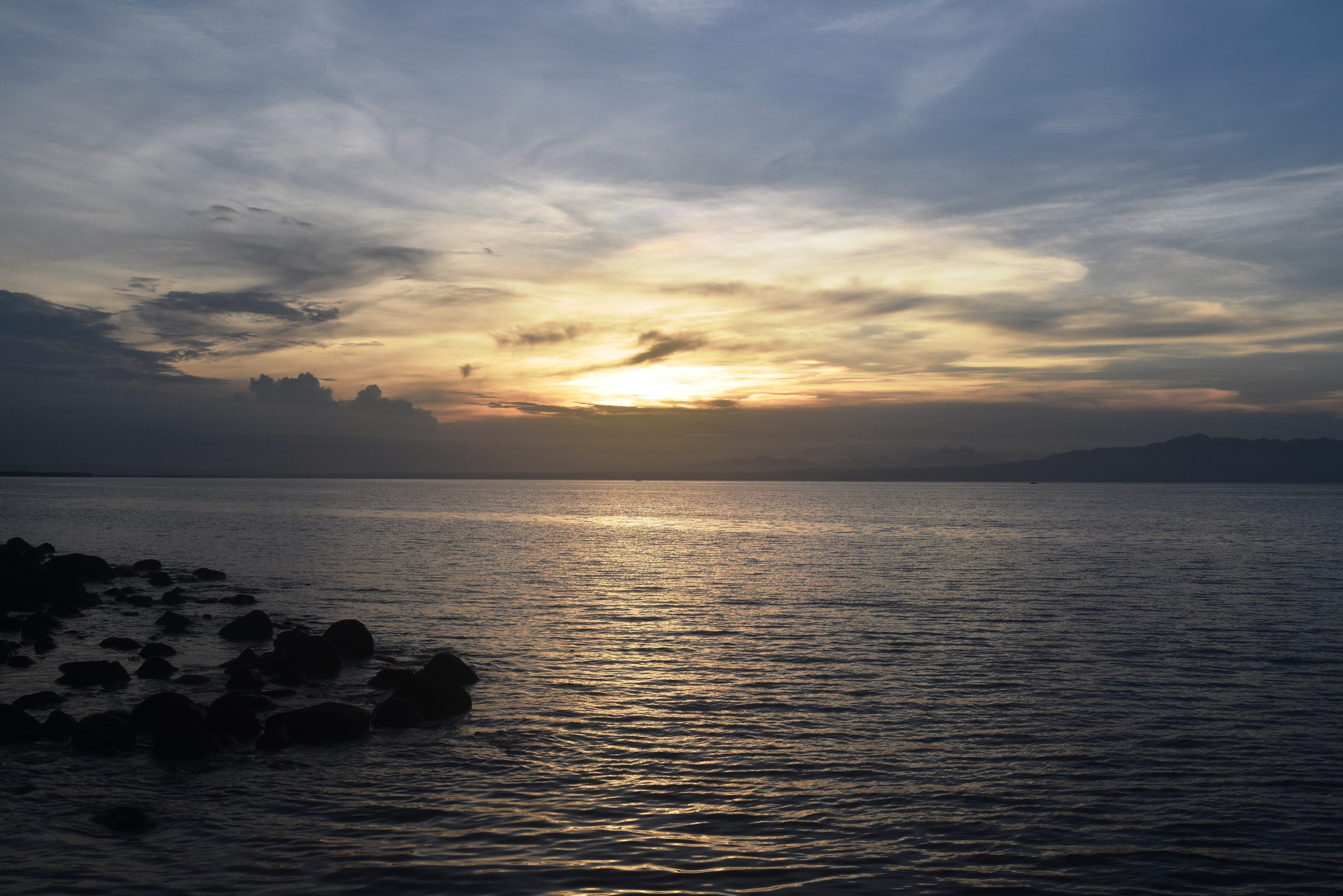
San Miguel Bay from Barangay Sabang

Calabanga is bounded by water bodies, the San Miguel Bay on the northern part and the Bikol River on the western part which are sources of abundant supplies of fish of various species and other marine products. The major river systems, the Tigman, Hinaguianan and Inarihan rivers are presently utilized for irrigation purposes. They originate their main tributaries from Mt. Isarog and flow down in the north-western direction ultimately discharging the flow to San Miguel Bay.

=== Topography and slope ===
The topographic landscape of the municipality could be characterized as generally flat with a slope 0-3%, gently sloping (3-8%) towards the direction of the eastern portion and finally rolling up to higher steeps towards the direction of the south-eastern part going to Mt. Isarog. The 0-3% slope is a broad area of flat to nearly level land which extends from Barangay Balongay along the Bicol River to Poblacion area and surrounding areas down to Barangay Manguiring. This is the dominant slope of the municipality.

== Demographics ==
Population census of Calabanga
Year	Pop.	±% p.a.
1903	7,563	—
1918	7,953	+0.34%
1939	15,087	+3.10%
1948	21,791	+4.17%
1960	28,467	+2.25%
1970	34,718	+2.00%
1975	40,274	+3.02%
1980	43,030	+1.33%
1990	54,261	+2.35%
1995	59,164	+1.63%
2000	67,408	+2.84%
2007	73,333	+1.17%
2010	78,119	+2.33%
2015	83,033	+1.17%
2020	88,906	+1.45%
2024	88,918	+0.00%
Source: Philippine Statistics Authority

In the 2024 census, the population of Calabanga was 88,918 people, with a density of 540 inhabitants per square kilometre or 1,400 inhabitants per square mile.

In the 2020 PSA Survey, Calabanga had a total population of 88,906 with 35,088 or 39.5% belong to the urban population and 53,818 or 60.5% belong to the rural population. There was an increase of 5,873 over the 2015 population. The total population is distributed over 13,444 households, registering an increase of 1,371 households over the 1995 household of 11,073. The average household size in 2000 survey slightly goes up to 5.4 from 5.3 persons in 1995.

Between 1995 and 2000, Calabanga grew at the rate of 2.83%, higher than the 1990-1995 rate of 1.63%. As per the 2010 census, the municipal population density is 477 persons per km^{2}.

Of the 48 barangays in the municipality, Barangay San Roque has the largest population of 5,513 people, composing 7.38% of the total population, followed by Barangay Santa Cruz Ratay with a population of 5,069 people. Barangay Punta Tarawal has the lowest population of 265 which only 0.44% of the total population.

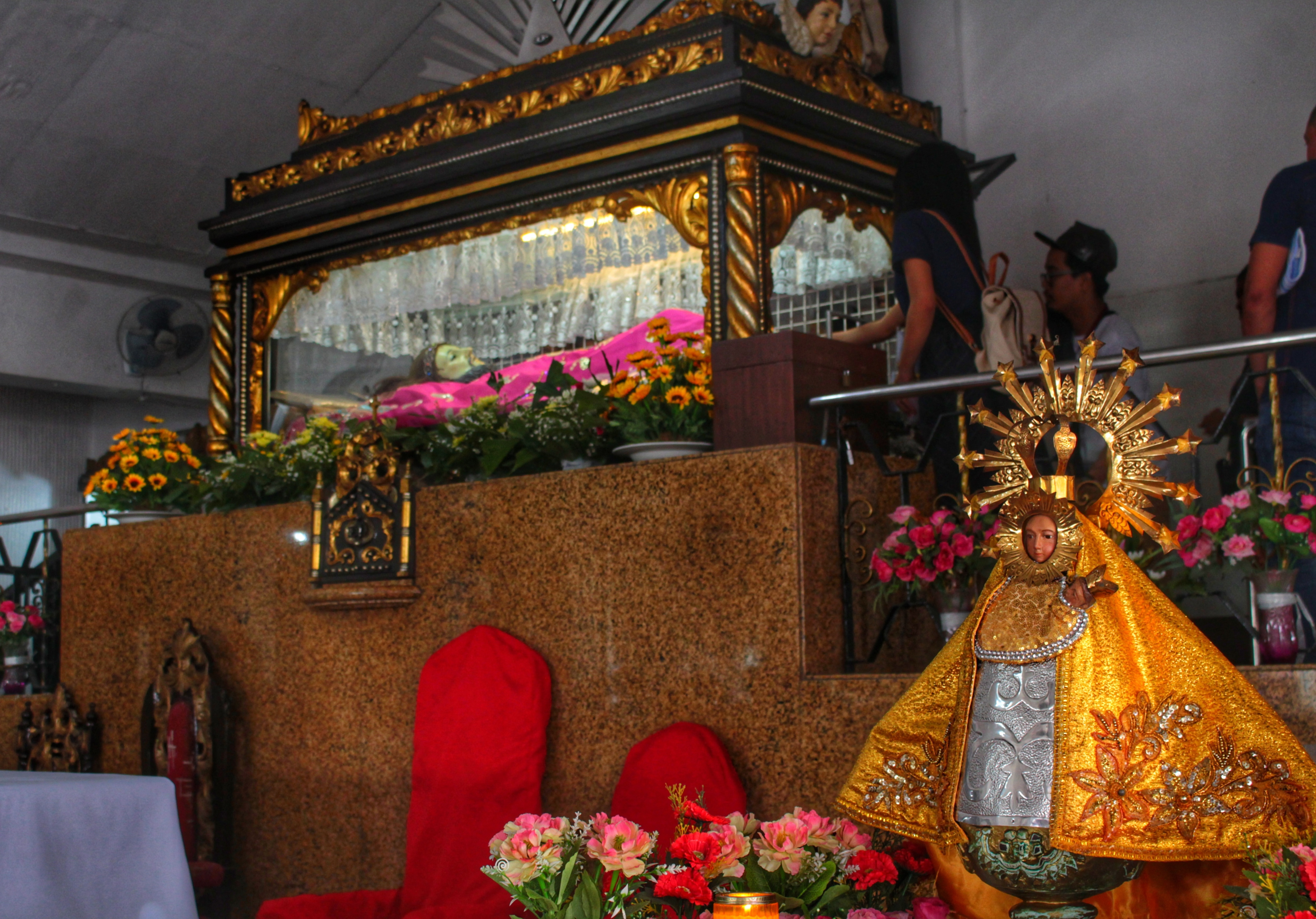
Amang Hinulid

Despite the influx of various religious groups, a large segment which is 95.28% of the populace is still Roman Catholics. Most of the populace, 95.93% are Bicolano speaking.

=== Isarog Agta language ===
In 2010, UNESCO released its third world volume of Endangered Languages in the World, where three critically endangered languages were in the Philippines. One of these languages is the Isarog Agta language which has an estimated five speakers in the year 2000. The language was classified as "critically endangered". If the remaining people do not pass their native language to the next generation of Isarog Agta people, their indigenous language will be extinct within a period of one to two decades.

The Isarog Agta people live within the circumference of Mount Isarog, though only five of them still know their indigenous language. They are one of the original Negrito settlers in the entire Philippines. They belong to the Aeta people classification, but have distinct language and belief systems unique to their own culture and heritage.

== Economy ==
Poverty incidence of Calabanga (%)

Source: Philippine Statistics Authority

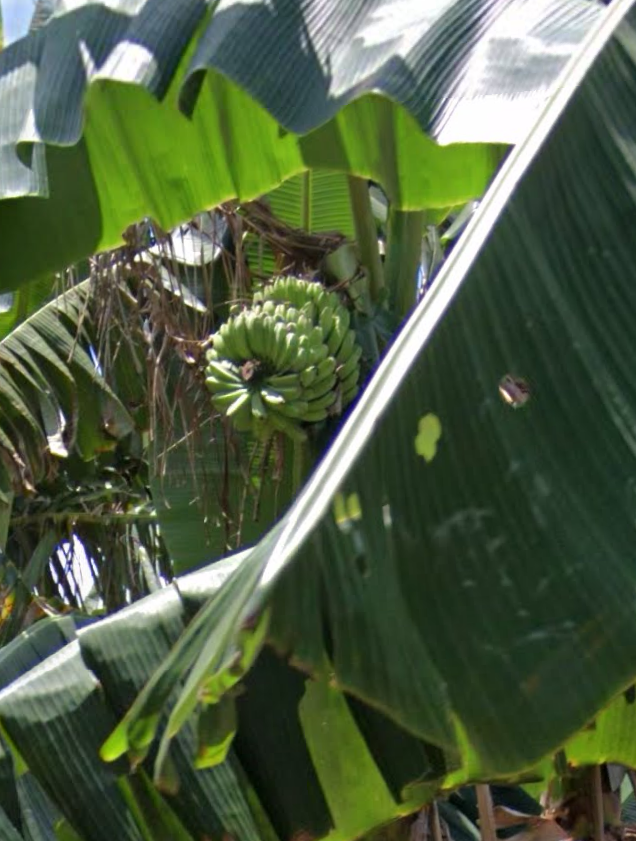
Banana growing on trees in Barangay Quinale

Calabanga became a 1st class municipality in October 2009. It is one of the municipalities of the province of Camarines Sur and a member of the Metro Naga Development Council. With its fishing grounds and the vast agricultural area, it is a major supplier of fish and other marine products and prime agricultural products in the province as well as in Metro Manila.

The town was formerly included in the Metro Naga area before the designation was discontinued in 2017.

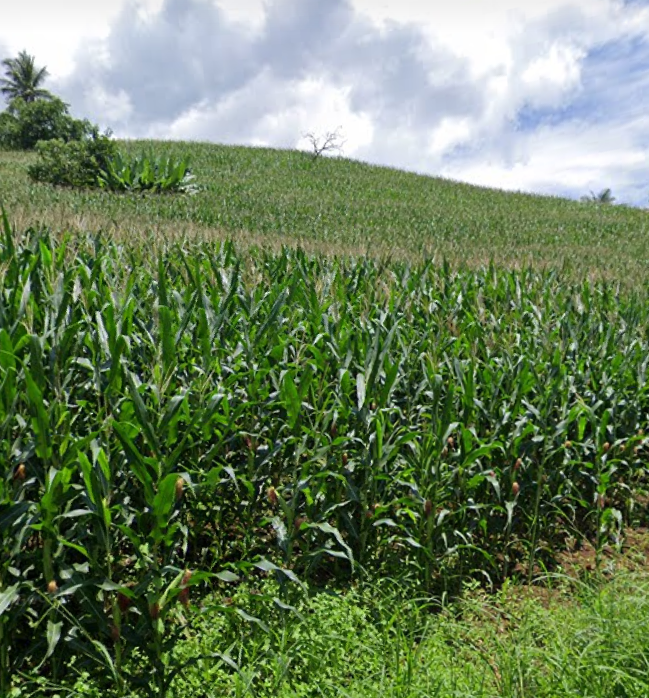
Pinada corn hill

== Tourism ==
Calabanga has several tourist attractions. Sites include the group of small islets/islands of Kawit, Tanglad, and Cabgan. Other places include Tigman, Hinaguianan and Inarihan rivers.

Notable Historical sites include the "Ladrillo" or a brick old church and ruins of Quipayo built sometime in 1578, more than four centuries ago, being the seat of the Catholic mission. Another is the "Hinulid", Santo Entiero shrine at Santa Salud which is an object of Friday devotion and pilgrimage. Thousands of devotees not only from Calabanga but other parts of Bicol Region and the country flock to the shrine during Maundy Thursday and Good Friday.

== Government ==
=== Elected officials ===
Members of the Calabanga Municipal Council (2022–2025)
Position	Name of official
District Representative (3rd Legislative District, Camarines Sur)	Rep. Gabriel H. Bordado Jr.
Mayor	Eugene Norman B. Severo
Vice-Mayor	Victor B. de Villa
Councilors	Sherwin Francis O. Mendoza
Councilors	Ruben Medroso III
Councilors	Ricardo A. Calisura
Councilors	Cielito Hilado
Councilors	Mike Bordado
Councilors	Pungay Tabinas
Councilors	Adonis Aguilar Jr.
Councilors	Roque Orlin

== Infrastructure ==
=== Highways ===
Calabanga only has one highway that traverses the municipality. It is the Naga North road or widely known as Naga - Siruma road. The highway starts at the boundary of Naga in the intersection of Bagumbayan St, San Vicente Road and Capilihan St up until the Siruma National High School campus.

=== Utilities ===
Water supply is managed by the Calabanga Water District (CAWADI), operational since October 19, 1987, with 10,373 active service connections supporting residential and commercial users. In 2023, CAWADI recorded 83.4% accounted-for water, 79.1% revenue-producing water, and 20.9% non-revenue water losses, while providing 24-hour service in serviced areas. The district's approved 2025 budget of operations facilitates maintenance, leak repairs, and potential expansions to reduce losses and broaden coverage.

The main source of potable water supply comes from Balombon spring. It has a capacity of 10 lps enough to serve 18 barangays. The areas being served include San Antonio poblacion, Del Carmen, Sta Isabel, San Miguel, San Vicente, Santa Salud, San Lucas, San Pablo, San Francisco, Sta Cruz Poblacion, Paolbo, Manguiring, Balombon, San Roque, San Isidro, Pagatpat, Sabang and Salvacion Baybay. Most of these areas are in the poblacion and the rest are barangays traversed from the source.

The power supply in Calabanga has been provided by the NAPOCOR through the Camarines Sur Electric Cooperative II (CASURECO II) since January 27, 1969 where the first lighting ceremony took off. At present, all the 48 barangays of the municipality are already served with electricity. As of 2020 census 99.82% of Calabangueños have access to electricity.

In August 2024, the 74.2 MWp Calabanga Solar Project in Camarines Sur commenced commercial operations, injecting renewable energy into the Luzon grid and aiding utilities like CASURECO II in enhancing supply reliability amid ongoing infrastructure expansions targeted for 2025 and beyond.

== Transportation ==
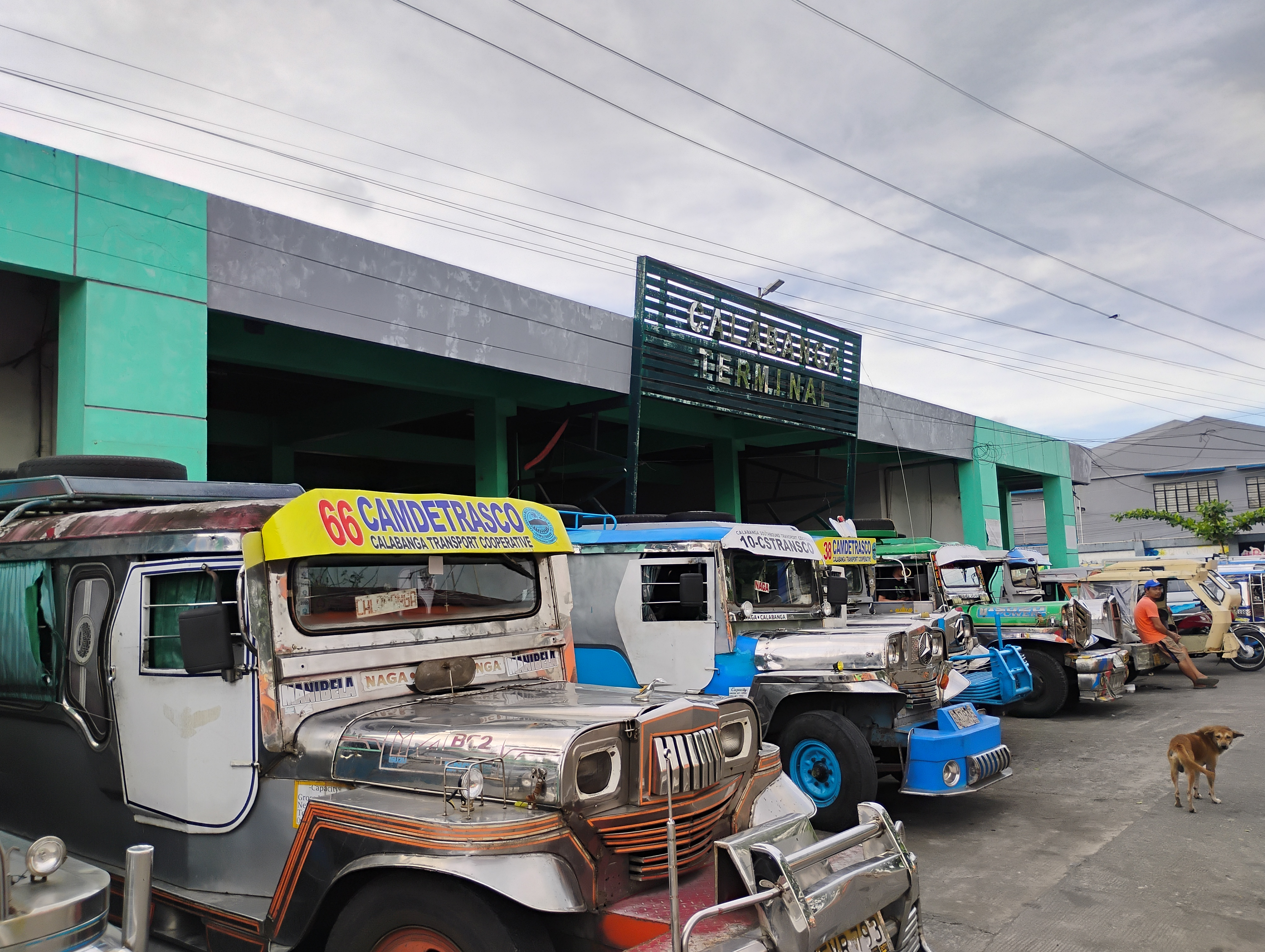
Calabanga Terminal

All the barangays of the municipality are linked by road system. The municipality is easily accessible from Naga, Bicol Region's prime city. Most of the total road networks need improvements and rehabilitation to provide greater access to far-flung barangay residents and facilitate hauling and marketing of farm produce to the poblacion and marketing centers.

From Metro Manila, Calabanga is accessible via Naga. First, by a 45-minute plane flight to Naga Airport located at Pili and a car/jeep ride of some 40 minutes to Calabanga. Another choice is a 7–10 hours aircon bus trip direct to Calabanga being provided by three bus lines. The Philippine National Railways (PNR) also provide trips from Manila to Bicol and vice- versa having a station at Naga City, then it takes some 20–30 minutes ride from Naga to Calabanga.

== Communications ==
Calabanga is being served by private telephone companies, the L.M. United Telephone Company (UNITEL) and the BAYANTEL Company which provides individual connections for those at the urban and outlying barangays. These companies provide local and long-distance calls to Metro Manila or any point in the country or any other place where the system can reach. In 2002, the cellular mobile phone services within the municipality was improved and expanded through the installation of telecommunication facilities such as the cell site by two private telecommunication companies. The Bureau of Telecommunications, a government operated agency having a Telecom Office stationed in the municipality is providing telegraphic services to the residents of Calabanga while Postal services is provided mainly by the Philippine postal corporation.

According to the provincial government of Camarines Sur as of 2021 Calabanga has around 49,356 cellphone users and 30,057 people use internet.

Naga TV relay stations as well as the cable TV stations are tuned-in in the municipality while a local cable TV station and a private; local community television station and a newly opened radio station are based in the municipality. Radio broadcasts from several radio stations in Naga City and previously from Canaman.

== Healthcare ==
Health facilities available are 24 private clinics (Medical & Dental), 7 Main and Rural Health Centers and 15 Pharmacies.

With the social welfare services devolved to the LGU as mandated under RA 7160, which is the Local Government Code of 1991, the municipality of Calabanga have assumed the responsibility of implementing the various programs such as the Child and Youth Welfare, Family and Community Organizing, Women's Welfare, Elderly and Disabled persons. Other services include family life education and counseling, Aid to individuals in Crisis Situation and emergency assistance which have the most number of clienteles. The municipality was able to establish and maintain 62-Day Care Centers located at 48 barangays.

== Education ==
The Calabanga Schools District Office governs all educational institutions within the municipality. It oversees the management and operations of all private and public, from primary to secondary schools.

Education is offered through the 34 public elementary schools and 8 public secondary schools throughout the municipality. There are also several private schools offering pre-school, grade school and high school. A college education and technical/vocational courses are offered by two government-owned institutions; the Calabanga Community College and the Central Bicol State University of Agriculture (Calabanga Campus), as well as privately owned computer schools.

The literacy rate in the municipality is high at 98.5%. The NSO survey in 2000 for household population, 5 years old and over in terms of educational attainment, reflects the following; of the total population, 29,555 are in the elementary grade; 15,037 are in high school; only 2,623 or 0.045% of the population has no grade completed. Among the population, 4,446 are college undergraduates with 1,057 degree holders and 201 with post baccalaureate degrees.

Name of School	Address
Calabanga Central Division Pilot School	San Francisco, Calabanga, Camarines Sur
Calabanga National Science High School	Santa Cruz, Calabanga, Camarines Sur
Calabanga West Central School	San Francisco, Calabanga, Camarines Sur
Central Bicol State University of Agriculture-Calabanga	Santa Cruz, Calabanga, Camarines Sur
Central Bicol State University of Agriculture Laboratory High School Calabanga Campus	Santa Cruz, Calabanga, Camarines Sur
Balatasan Elementary School	Balatasan, Calabanga, Camarines Sur
Balombon Elementary School	Balombon, Calabanga, Camarines Sur
Balongay Elementary School	Balongay, Calabanga, Camarines Sur
Binaliw Elementary School	Binaliw, Calabanga, Camarines Sur
Binanuaanan Grande Elementary School	Binanuaanan Grande, Calabanga, Camarines Sur
Binanuanan Pequeño Elementary School	Binanuaanan Pequeño, Calabanga, Camarines Sur
Burabod Elementary School	Burabod, Calabanga, Camarines Sur
Cagsao Elementary School	Cagsao, Calabanga, Camarines Sur
Calabanga Community College	Santa Cruz, Calabanga, Camarines Sur
Camuning Elementary School	Camuning, Calabanga, Camarines Sur
Comaguingking Elementary School	Comaguingking, Calabanga, Camarines Sur
Dominican School of Calabanga	San Francisco, Calabanga, Camarines Sur
Dominorog Elementary School	Dominorog, Calabanga, Camarines Sur
Escuela de la Salud	Sta. Salud, Calabanga, Camarines Sur
Fabrica Elementary School	Fabrica, Calabanga, Camarines Sur
G. Dumalasa Elementary School	Bonot Santa Rosa, Calabanga, Camarines Sur
Hansel and Gretel Learning School	San Isidro, Calabanga, Camarines Sur
Harubay Elementary School	Harubay, Calabanga, Camarines Sur
Hinaguianan Elementary School	Manguiring, Calabanga, Camarines Sur
Ilihan Elementary School	Tomagodtod, Calabanga, Camarines Sur
Inarihan SDA Multi-Grade School	Paolbo, Calabanga, Camarines Sur
Jose De Villa National High School	Manguiring, Calabanga, Camarines Sur
Lope Guisic Elementary School	Santo Domingo, Calabanga, Camarines Sur
Lugsad Elementary School	Lugsad, Calabanga, Camarines Sur
Manguiring Elementary School	Manguiring, Calabanga, Camarines Sur
Medroso - Mendoza National High School	Binanuaanan Pequeno, Calabanga, Camarines Sur
Our Lady of La Porteria Academy	San Antonio, Calabanga, Camarines Sur
Pagatpat Elementary School	Pagatpat, Calabanga, Camarines Sur
Paolbo-Belen Elementary School	Paolbo, Calabanga, Camarines Sur
Pinada Elementary School	Pinada, Calabanga, Camarines Sur
Punta Tarala Elementary School	Punta Tarawal, Calabanga, Camarines Sur
Quinale Elem. School	Quinale, Calabanga, Camarines Sur
Quipayo Elementary School	La Purisima (Quipayo), Calabanga, Camarines Sur
Quipayo National High School	San Antonio (Quipayo), Calabanga, Camarines Sur
Ratay Elementary School	Santa Cruz, Calabanga, Camarines Sur
Sabang Elementary School	Sabang, Calabanga, Camarines Sur
Sabang National High School	Sabang, Calabanga, Camarines Sur
Salvacion Baybay Elementary School	Salvacion Baybay, Calabanga, Camarines Sur
San Bernardino Elementary School	San Bernardino, Calabanga, Camarines Sur
Santa Cruz Quipayo Elementary School	Santa Cruz (Quipayo), Calabanga, Camarines Sur
Siba-o Elem. School	Siba-o, Calabanga, Camarines Sur
Sibobo, Elementary School	Sibobo, Calabanga, Camarines Sur
Taculod Elementary School	San Roque, Calabanga, Camarines Sur
Tomagodtod Elementary School	Tomagodtod, Calabanga, Camarines Sur
Union Elementary School	San Lucas, Calabanga, Camarines Sur
Union National High School	Santo Domingo, Calabanga, Camarines Sur
West Coast National High School	Dominorog, Calabanga, Camarines Sur
MRDA Academic Center, Inc	San Isidro, Calabanga, Camarines Sur
Bicol Far East Polytechnic School, Inc.(TESDA Accredited Training Center)	San Isidro, Calabanga, Camarines Sur

== Culture and Arts ==
- CBSUA Chorale
- CEDT (Colours Edition Dance Troupe)
- SAMBIT ng CBSUA

== Notable personalities ==
- Suzette Doctolero, a drama writer and creative consultant for GMA Network.
