= Mount Isarog =

Active volcano in Camarines Sur, Philippines

Isarog
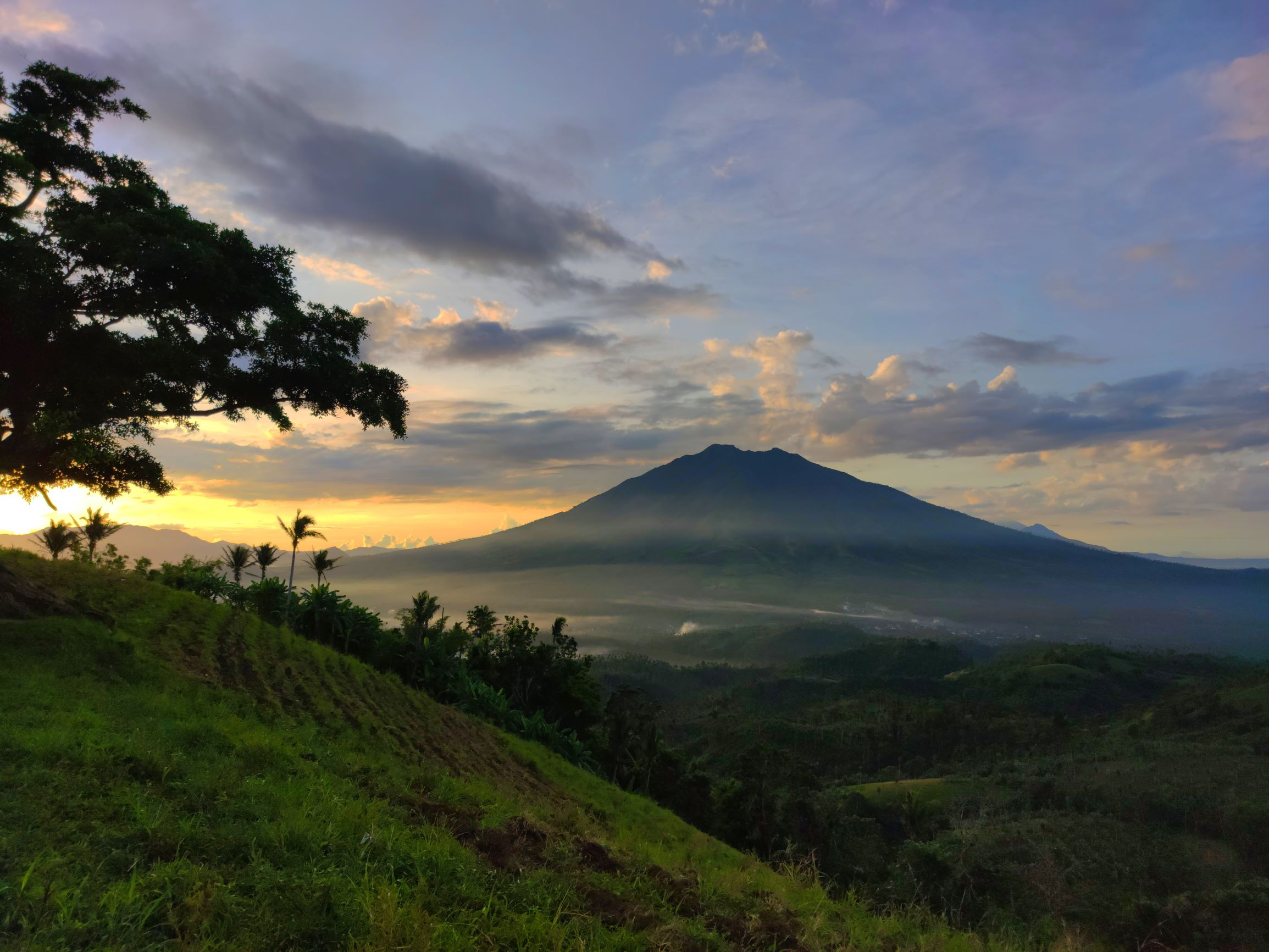
- Isarog Volcano viewed from Baao, Camarines Sur

Highest point
- Elevation: 2,000 m (6,600 ft)
- Prominence: 1,951 m (6,401 ft)
- Parent peak: Mayon
- Listing: Active volcano; Ultra; Ribu
- Coordinates: 13°39′33″N 123°22′24″E

Geography
- Location within Luzon Location within Philippines
- Country: Philippines
- Region: Bicol Region
- Province: Camarines Sur
- City/municipality: Calabanga; Goa; Naga City; Ocampo; Pili; Tigaon; Tinambac

Geology
- Mountain type: Stratovolcano
- Volcanic arc: Bicol Volcanic Arc
- Last eruption: 12th century CE (approx. 800 years ago); 3500 BCE ± 125 years (5,500 ya ± 125 years)

Climbing
- Easiest route: Concosep, Tigaon, Camarines Sur Route

Isarog is an active stratovolcano located in the province of Camarines Sur, Philippines, on the island of Luzon. The mountain has active fumaroles and hot springs. It has an elevation of 2,000 m (6,600 ft) above mean sea level.

The broad isthmus between Lagonoy Gulf and San Miguel Bay is occupied by the isolated Isarog volcano.

The volcano has a 2,500 m-wide (8202 ft) crater that is breached to the east along a narrow valley drained by the Rangas River. A major debris avalanche deposit extends northwest to the coast and into San Miguel Bay.

The peak of the mountain marks the point where the borders of six municipalities and one city meet (listed in clockwise direction, starting north): Goa, Tigaon, Ocampo, Pili, Naga City, Tinambac and Calabanga.

Isarog Volcano was where local troops of the Philippine Army and Constabulary units and Bicolano guerrillas hid during the Japanese Occupation. In the 1970s, with the leadership of Romulo Jallores and his brother, they established the New People's Army in the Bicol region at the foot of this mountain.

== Geology ==
Isarog Volcano is interpreted to have formed during the Pleistocene, as indicated by K-Ar dating of lava samples from the edifice, which yielded an age of 0.16 ± 0.12 Ma. The magmatic composition of Isarog Volcano is primarily andesitic, with minor dacitic components.

=== Eruptive history ===
Date (approximate)	No. of years ago (approximate)	References
12th century CE	800 years ago	Daita et al. (2024, 2025)
400 BCE to 1st century CE	2,500 to 2,000 years ago	Daita et al. (2024)
2300 BCE	4,300 years ago	Daita et al. (2020, 2024)
2500 BCE	4,500 years ago	Daita et al. (2024)
After 2700 BCE	Around 4,700 years ago	Marco et al. (2025)
3500 BCE	5,500 years ago	Fontijn and Newhall (2013)
27500 BCE	29,500 years ago	Fontijn and Newhall (2013)

Isarog Volcano has been active since the Late Pleistocene. Around 30,000 years ago, it erupted, producing pyroclastic density currents (PDC). In the Holocene, a major sector collapse of its northwestern flank generated the Tinambac debris avalanche, which extended to San Miguel Bay and formed hummocky terrain across Calabanga, Tinambac, and Goa in Camarines Sur. Following the collapse, the volcano gradually rebuilt its edifice, though later dome growth introduced a new phase of hazards.

Block-and-ash flows originating from lava dome collapses have occurred during the Holocene, one of which has a calibrated radiocarbon date of about 3500 BCE. In 2020, a group of geologists from Partido State University discovered that Isarog also erupted around 2300 BCE after a charcoal overlain by thick block-and-ash flow deposits was found. The charcoal was sent to the United States for radiocarbon dating. This new information about the eruptive history of Isarog was presented at the 2020 Virtual GeoCon, a convention of geologists organized by the Geological Society of the Philippines.

Subsequent research by the same group of geologists, now in collaboration with the University of the Philippines, the United States Geological Survey, and the Philippine Institute of Volcanology and Seismology, has uncovered additional eruptions of Isarog Volcano. These include: an eruption around 2500 BCE, identified through charcoal obtained from a pyroclastic flow deposit in Sitio Napanap, Napawon, Goa, Camarines Sur; a period of explosive activity from 400 BCE to the 1st century CE, which deposited thick ash layers reaching as far as Pugay, San Jose, Camarines Sur; and an eruption in the 12th century CE, producing thick ash deposits in Bagumbayan Grande, Goa, Camarines Sur. A potsherd found beneath the ash indicates that humans were already inhabiting the area of Goa during the volcano's most recent eruption in the 12th century CE.

Aside from sector collapse and block-and-ash flows, Isarog Volcano is also inferred to have experienced crater-breach events in the past. This is supported by the presence of extensive lahar deposits and large boulders emplaced along the eastern flank where the crater is breached, covering wide areas including rice fields and corn plantations. Local oral tradition in the Partido District further recounts that Isarog "erupts water" rather than magma. Such accounts may reflect ancestral memories of a crater-breach flood, preserved and transmitted across generations in the form of myth.

Currently, Isarog vent displays gas seepages, warm springs, and steaming vents.

=== Reports of Unusual Activity ===
On November 8, 1915, frequent earthquakes were felt on and around Isarog volcano, with some occasional noises. Landslides occurred on the slopes of Isarog volcano. The seismic swarm repeated itself 2 or 3 times at long intervals until January 10, 1916. The volcano was thickly wooded, even inside of the crater, and nobody observed any fumaroles.

== History ==
=== Indigenous history ===
Isarog Volcano has been the ancestral territory of the indigenous Isarog Agta people for thousands of years prior to the arrival of the Spanish. They were among the first inhabitants in the entire Philippines and are of Negrito origin. They are a group of Aeta people with a distinct language and heritage unique from others.

=== Legal history ===
It was made a public land through the Proclamation No. 157 on March 28, 2015. Towns around it is classified as timberland forest with an area of 13,433 hectares (33,190 acres).

On August 17, 1935, General Frank Murphy established the Mt. Isarog Forest Reserve which reduced the size of the area to 10,112. But it was revoked by President Manuel L. Quezon when he signed Proclamation No. 293 titled "Establishment of Mt. Isarog as a National Park."

The Earth Summit of 1992 prompted the creation of the National Integrated Protected Area Programme. A five-year (1995-2001) intervention plan was enacted. On June 20, 2002, by virtue of Proclamation No. 214 signed by President Gloria Macapagal-Arroyo, Mt. Isarog became a protected area under the natural park.

== Ethnic groups ==
=== Isarog Agta Tribe ===
The Isarog Agta people live within the circumference of Isarog Volcano, though only 5 of them still know their indigenous language. They are one of the original Negrito settlers in the entire Philippines. They belong to the Aeta people classification, but have distinct language and belief systems unique to their own culture and heritage.

In 2010, UNESCO released its 3rd world volume of Endangered Languages in the World, where 3 critically endangered languages were in the Philippines. One of these languages in the Isarog Agta language which has an estimated speaker of 5 people in the year 2000. The language was classified as Critically Endangered, meaning the youngest speakers are grandparents and older, and they speak the language partially and infrequently and hardly pass the language to their children and grandchildren anymore. If the remaining 150 people do not pass their native language to the next generation of Isarog Agta people, their indigenous language will be extinct within a period of 1 to 2 decades.

== Biodiversity ==
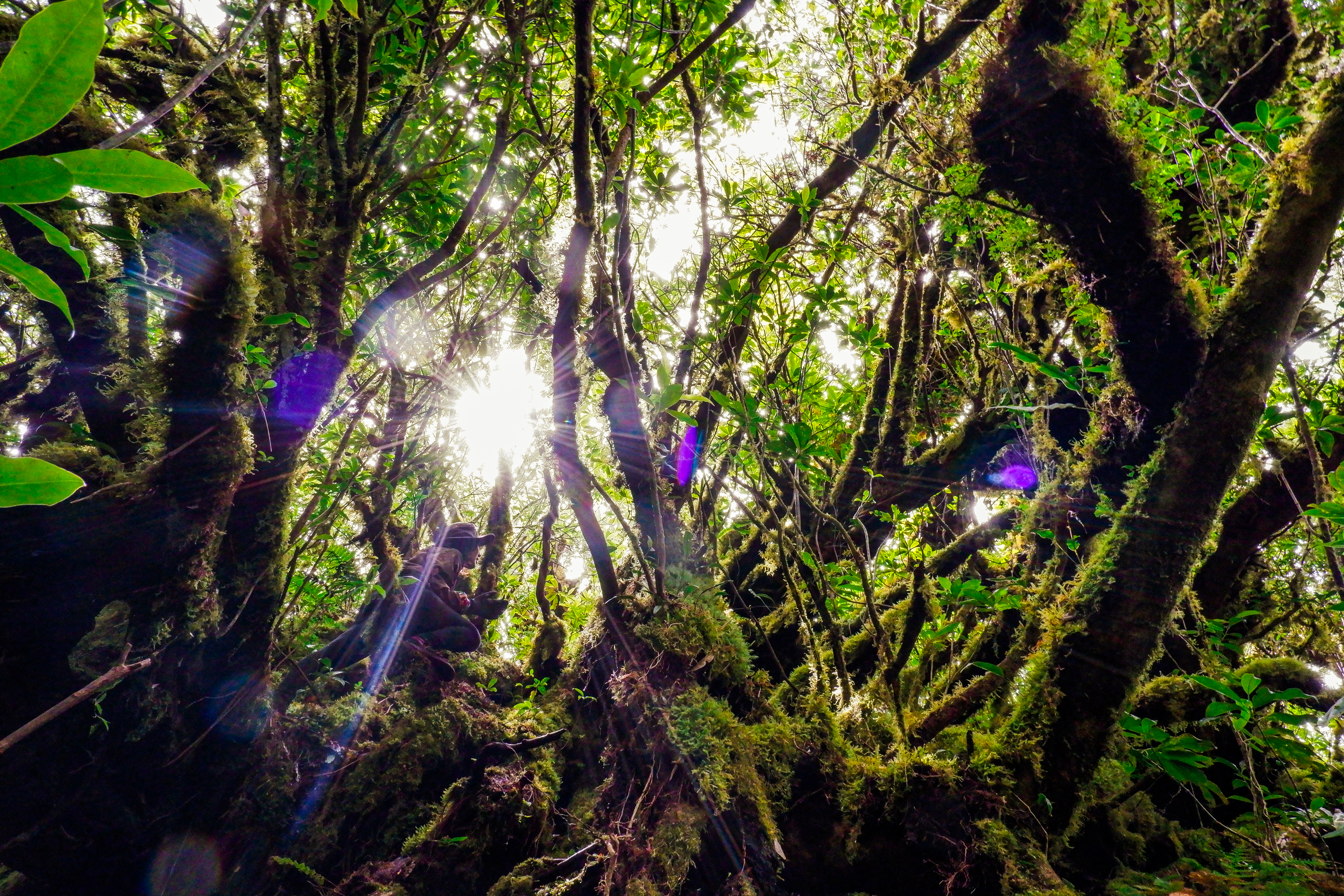
A mossy forest in Mt. Isarog

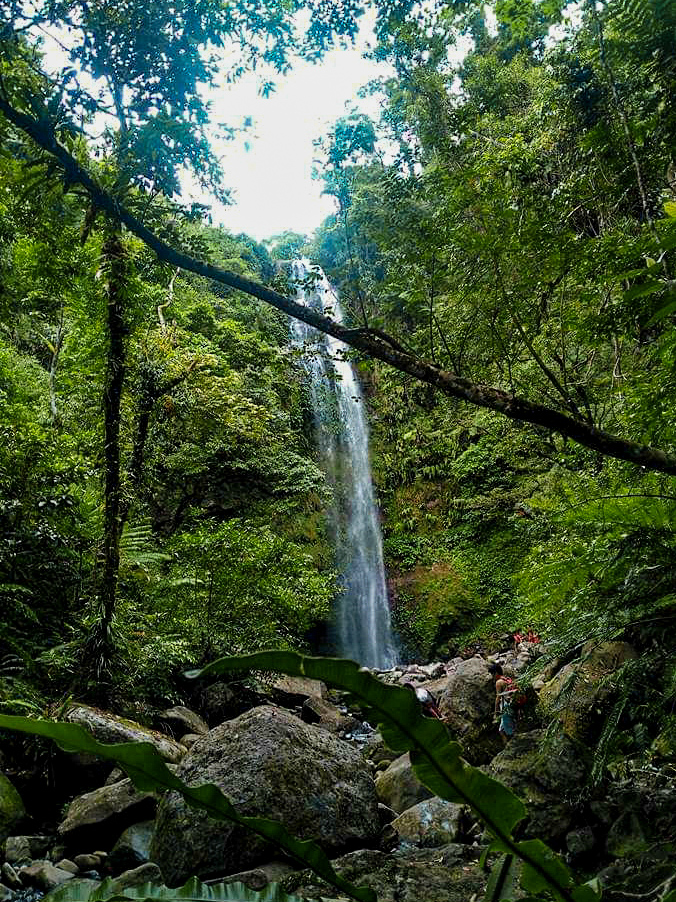
Balang (Shower) Falls in Sitio Boncao, Curry, Pili, Camarines Sur

Mt. Isarog has a rich diversity. It displays four major types of natural habitat or vegetation: from the warm grassland and lowland forest to the wet and cool climate of montane forest.

Types	Altitude (meters asl.)
Lowland Forest	500-900
Grassland	700-1,200
Montane Forest	1,000-1,400
Mossy Forest	1,500-to the summit

The lowland forest is noted for its tall canopy. The uppermost layer towers between 30 and 40 meters and sometimes even reach 60 meters. Many of these trees belong to the dipterocarp family. The second canopy layer (between 23 and 30 meters) has the sustain bamboos (Bambusa), arborescent palms (Calamus), climbing bamboo (Schizostacyum), climbing pandans (Freycinetia) and vascular epiphytes such as orchids and ferns.

The grassland (parang) is dominated by cogon (Imperata cylindrica) and talahib (Saccharum ovatum) grasses. The topography and soil condition of the area limits the growth of trees, giving rise to the grassland.

The montane forest has two-oken because layered canopy trees ranging from 12 to 25 meters with noticeable canopy gaps due to the absence of large trees.

The mossy forest has a canopy with a small height of 2 to 6 meters only. The canopy is broken because of the high winds and steep terrain. It is inhabited by bamboo, pandan, orchids, ferns, pitcher plants and other epiphytes. Trees at this level are covered with moss.

=== Endemic ===
Isarog Shrew rat (Rhynchomys isarogensis) was first discovered in 1988 in Isarog Volcano. Although it has no direct economic value, its presence in Isarog Volcano is a barometer of wealth and management of its natural resources. It is now listed as endangered in the Red Data Book of the International Union for Conservation of Nature.

Isarog Volcano is included as a protected area, home to endemic rodents (Archboldomys luzonensis, Chrotomys gonzalesi and Rhynchomys isarogensis), other endemic mammals, and 15 bird species endemic to Luzon.

Isarog Cloud Frog was first described by scientists in 1997. In total, scientists have identified one and possibly three new frog species, 8 species of snakes, and 19 species of lizards.

Isarog Volcano also has the rare Mount Isarog Forest Skink (Sphenomorphus knollmanae) that is endemic.

== Gallery ==
Remote views of Mount Isarog

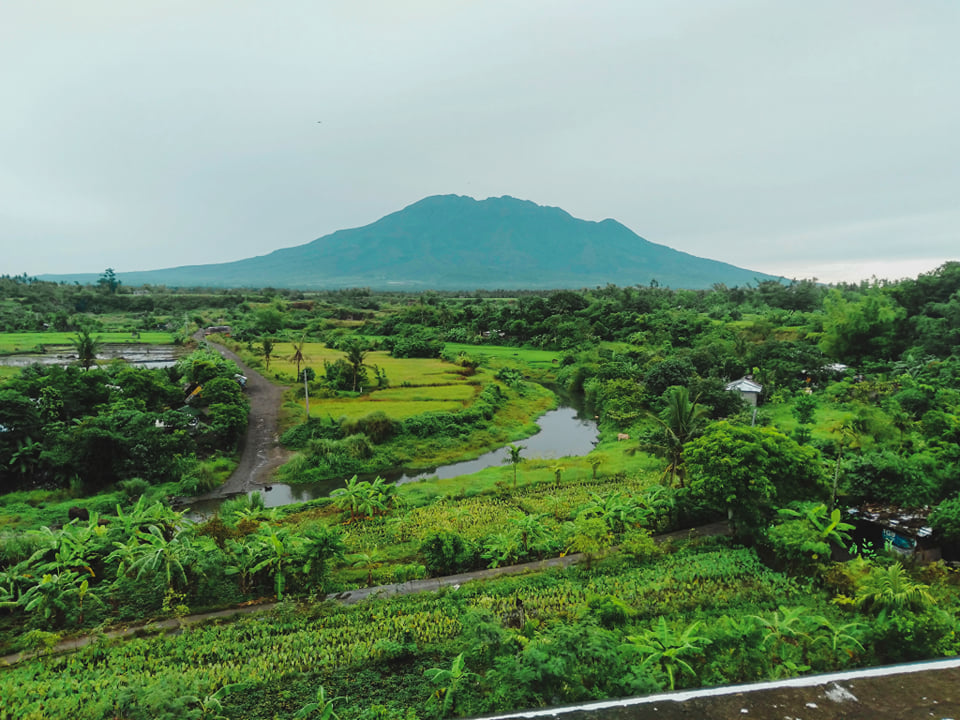
From Pili, Camarines Sur

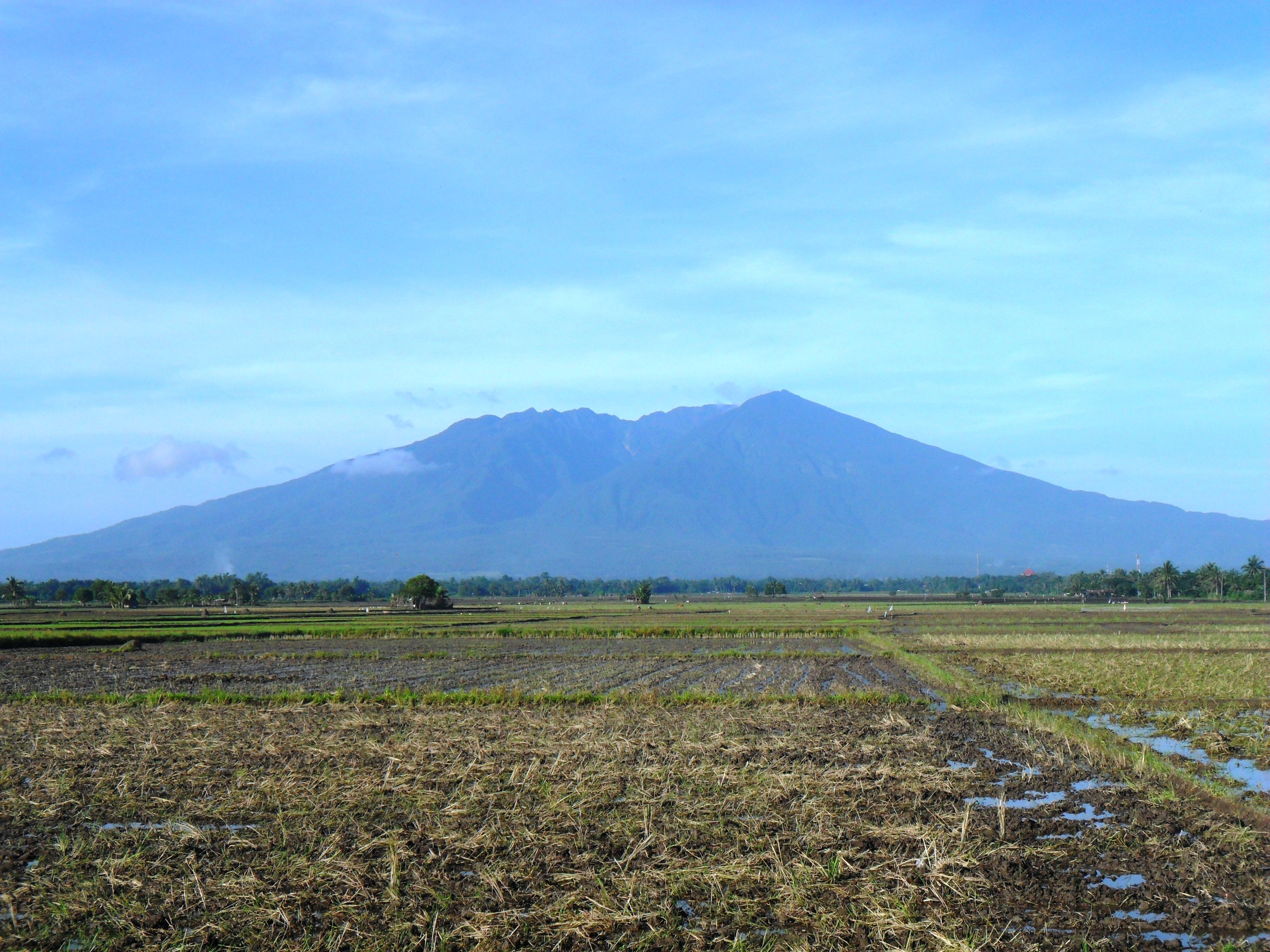
From San Jose, Camarines Sur

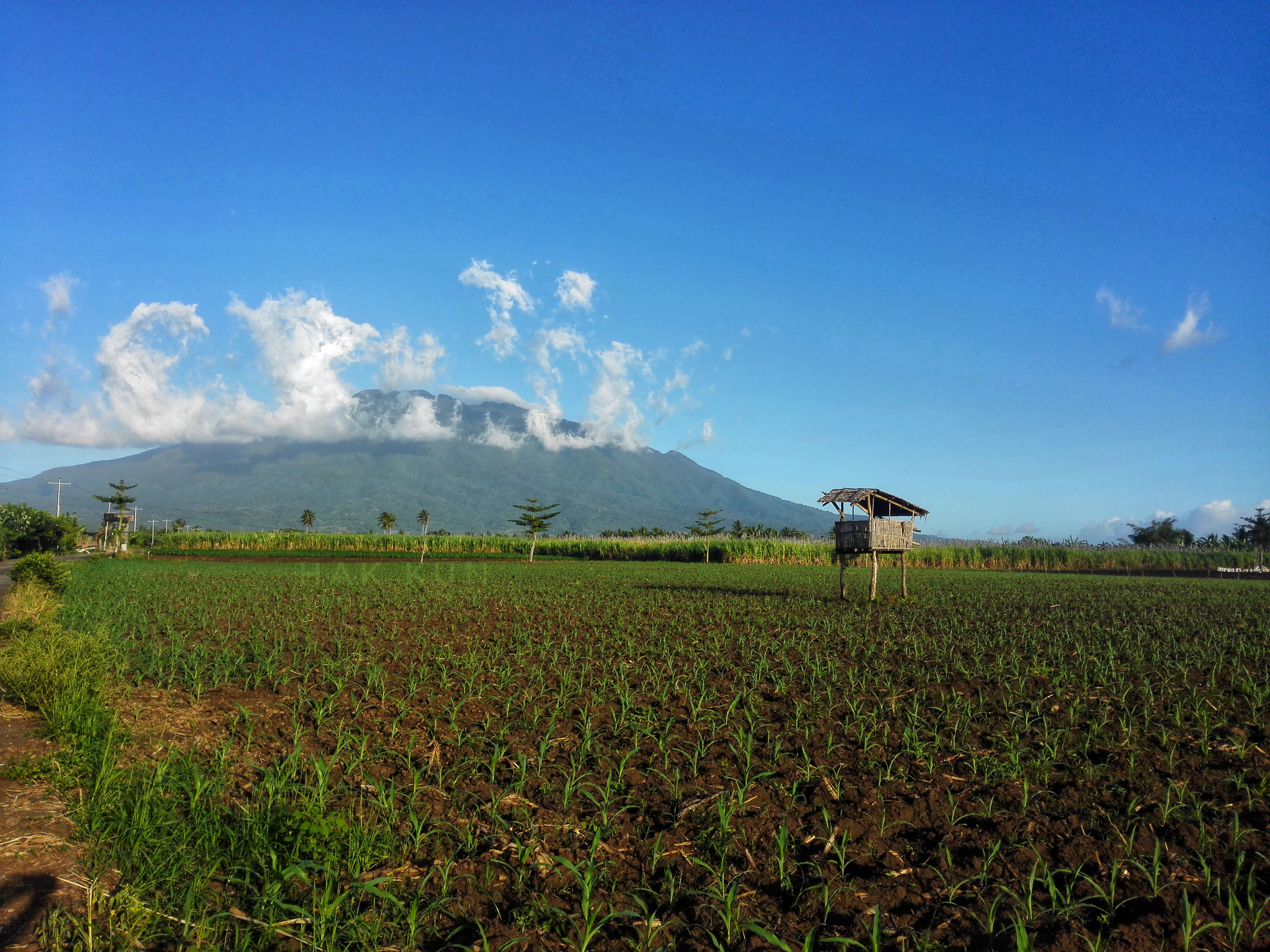
From Naga, Camarines Sur

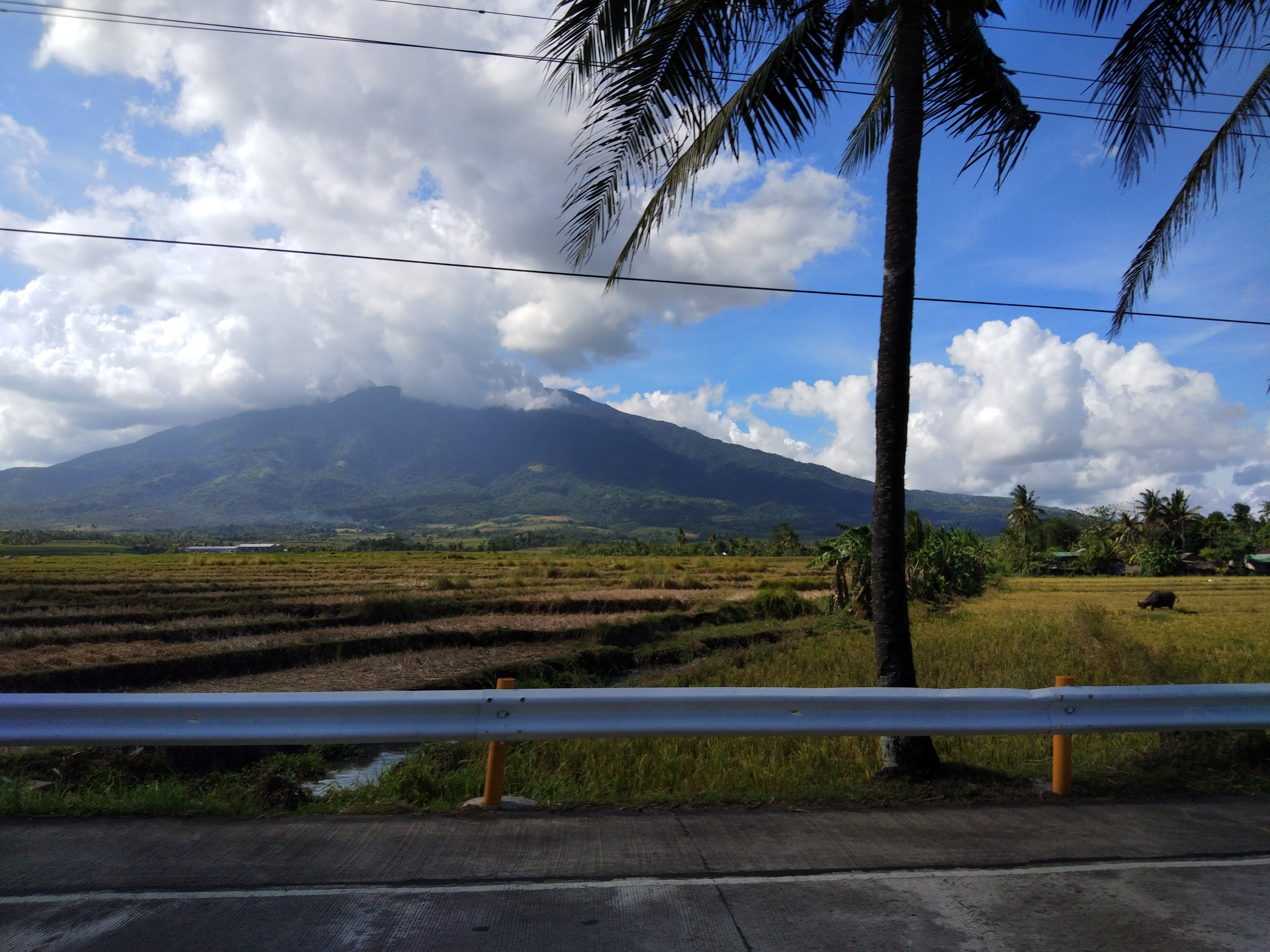
From Ocampo, Camarines Sur

== See also ==
- List of volcanoes in the Philippines
  - List of active volcanoes in the Philippines
  - List of potentially active volcanoes in the Philippines
  - List of inactive volcanoes in the Philippines
- List of protected areas of the Philippines
  - List of natural parks of the Philippines
- Philippine Institute of Volcanology and Seismology
- Pacific ring of fire
