= San Miguel Bay =

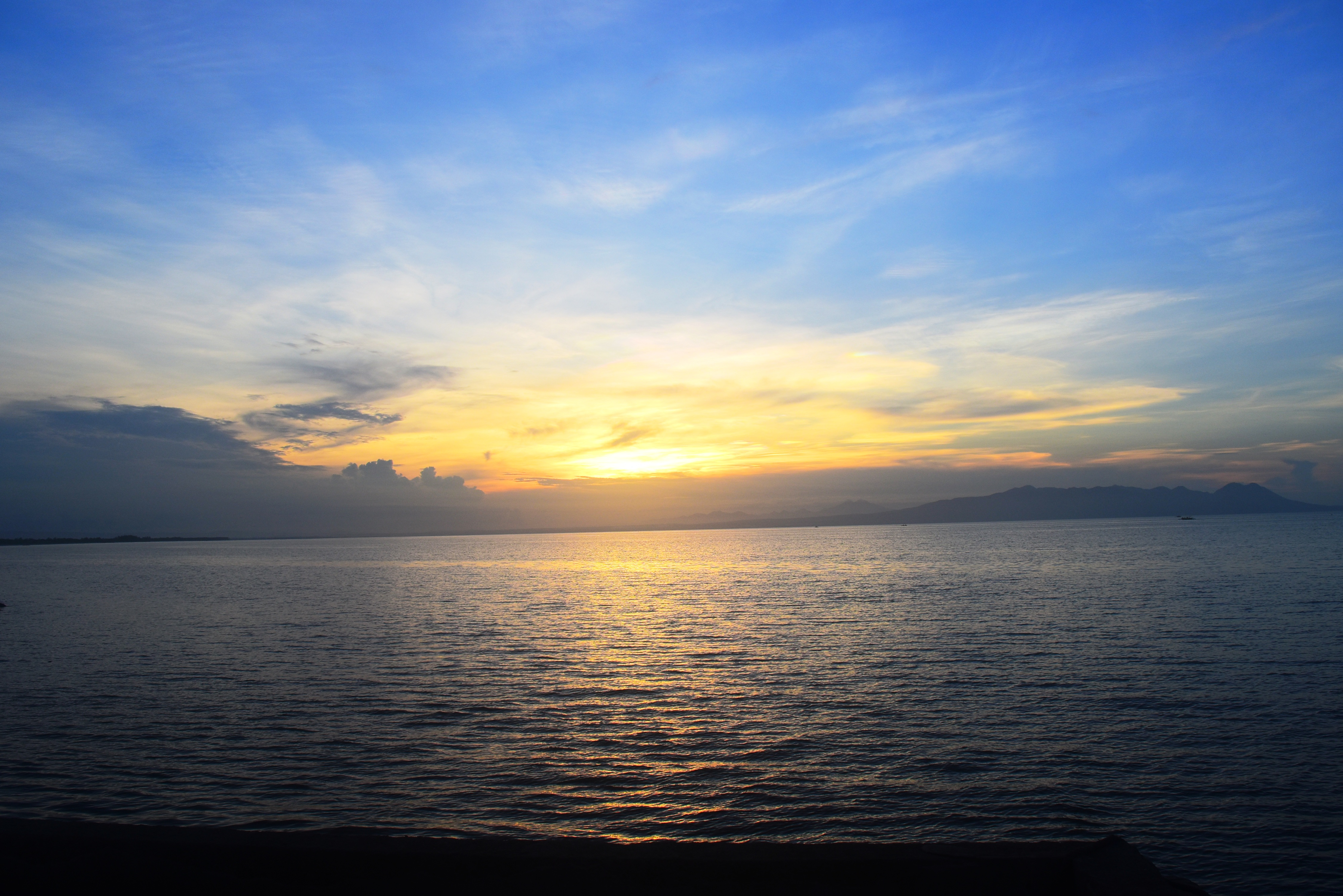
- Sunset in San Miguel bay, Calabanga, Camarines Sur

- Location in Luzon Location in the Philippines
- Location: Bicol Peninsula, Luzon Island, Philippines
- Coordinates: 13.874142°N 123.180233°E
- Type: bay
- Settlements: Cabusao; Calabanga; Mercedes; Sipocot; Siruma; Tinambac

San Miguel Bay is a large bay in the Bicol Peninsula of Luzon island in the Philippines. It encompasses the provinces of Camarines Norte and Camarines Sur.

The province of Camarines Norte is to the west and Camarines Sur is to the south and east of the bay. The coastline consists of numerous sandy beaches and mangrove forests. Ninety-five percent of the seabed in the bay is covered by sandy and silt soils. The remaining five percent is covered by coral reefs, these are mostly located in the northwest and northeast of the bay. Seagrass and algae beds line the shorelines of the islands at the exit to the Philippine Sea.

San Miguel Bay has a total annual fish production of about 20,000 t was recorded from the Bay. About 64% of this was contributed by some 5,100 small-scale fishermen, while the rest was landed by 95 commercial trawlers of varying sizes. Economic analysis revealed the existence of strong competition among the different fishing sectors over the use of the Bay's resources and income is unevenly distributed in favor of the commercial trawlers, which employ only 7% of the total number of fishermen in the area. Ownership and earning of the trawlers were concentrated in 35 families, while the small-scale fishing gears were distributed evenly among 2,000 families.

San Miguel Bay is a major fishing ground on the Pacific coast of the Philippines. The Bay is exploited by trawler operators and small-scale fishermen competing for the same resources.

In the Murillo Velarde Map of 1734, this inlet was called Ensenada de Naga or Naga Bay. In a latter Velarde/Bagay Map 1744-49, it was simply attached to name of the town at mouth of the bay, Siruma. By the early 1970s competition among increasing numbers of small-scale fishermen operating within San Miguel Bay already had led to a decline in catch per effort. As competition from trawlers began to increase, the perceived impact on the stock became an issue of growing concern among the thousands of small-scale fishermen affected. At the same time, the first of the world-wide energy crises struck, leading to major increases in the cost of operation. The close of the decade saw the small-scale fishermen of San Miguel Bay caught between declining catches and increasing costs.
