= Canaman =

Municipality in Camarines Sur, Philippines

- Municipality
- Municipality of Canaman
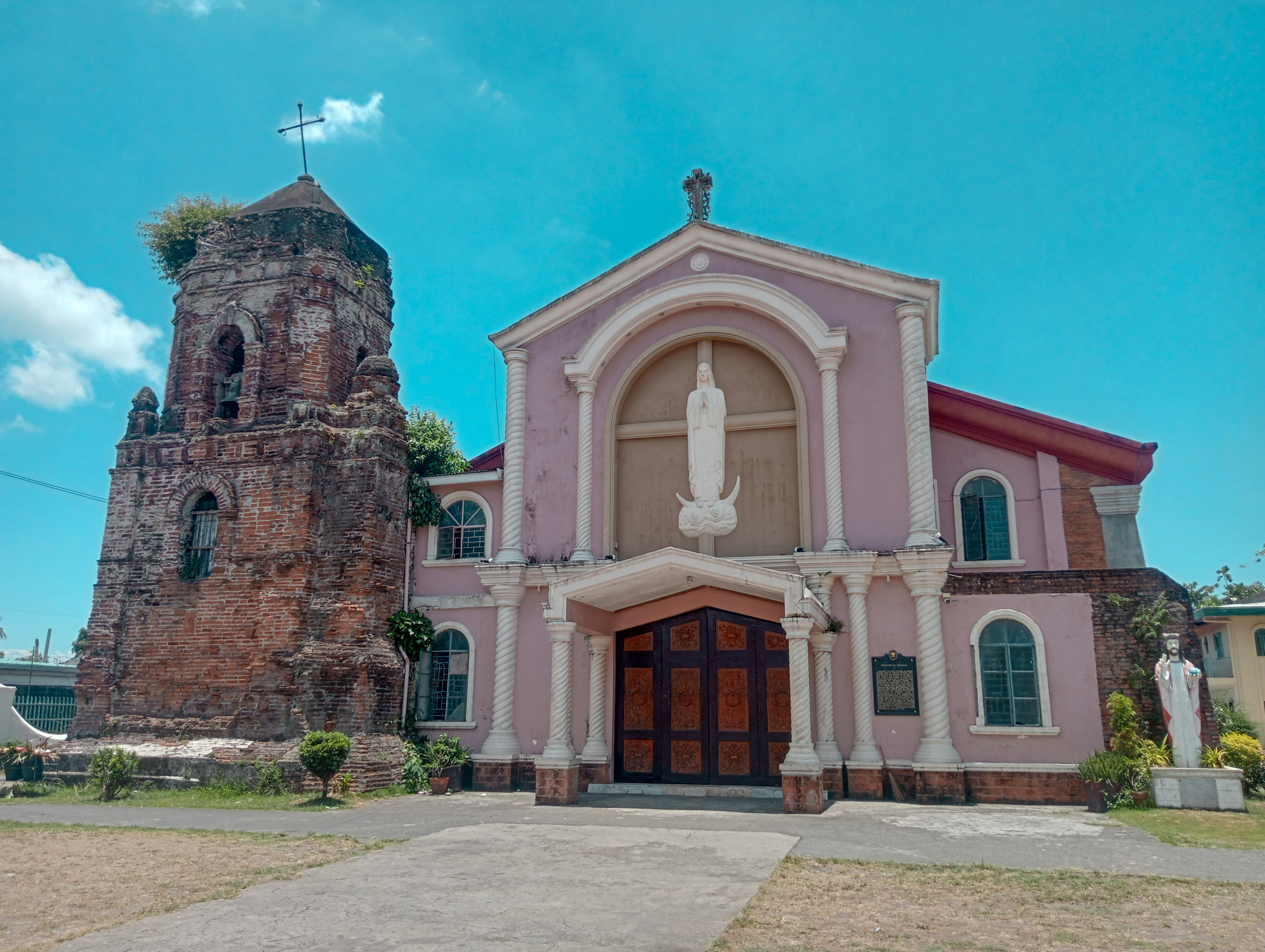
- Canaman Church

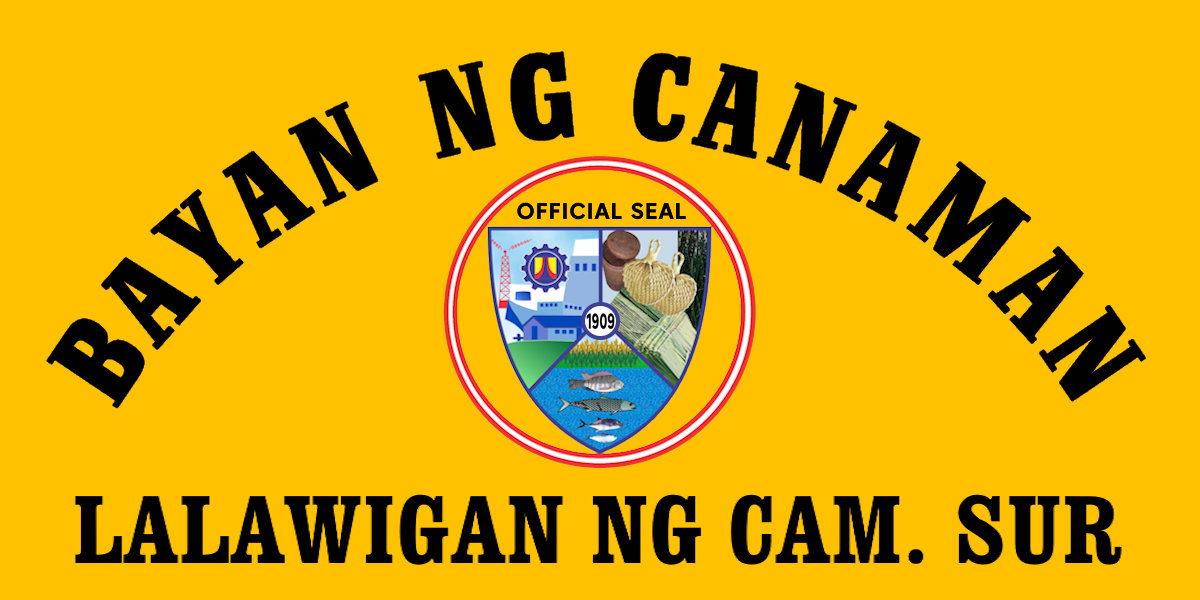
- Flag Seal
- Nicknames: Citadel of Bicol Culture; Birthplace of Tancong Vaca Guerilla Unit
- Motto: "Bangon Canaman!" ("Rise Canaman!")
- Map of Camarines Sur with Canaman highlighted
- Interactive map of Canaman
- Location within the Philippines
- Coordinates: 13°38′53″N 123°10′16″E
- Country: Philippines
- Region: Bicol Region
- Province: Camarines Sur
- District: 3rd district
- Founded: 1583
- Barangays: 24 (see Barangays)

Government
  - Type: Sangguniang Bayan
  - Mayor: Nelson M. Legaspi
  - Vice Mayor: Joel Joseph B. Abante
  - Representative: Nelson S. Legacion
  - Municipal Council: Members: Claire F. Cantillo; Chona B. Nuñez; Arnel N. Ibasco; Jonathan Keith R. Corporal; Alexsis D. Capsa; Jaime S. Esta Jr.; Larry Nico M. Basmayor; Nadya R. Basco
  - Electorate: 23,410 voters (2025)

Area
  - Total: 43.27 km^{2} (16.71 sq mi)
- Elevation: 4.0 m (13.1 ft)
- Highest elevation: 26 m (85 ft)
- Lowest elevation: −3 m (−9.8 ft)

Population (2024 census)
  - Total: 35,766
  - Density: 826.6/km^{2} (2,141/sq mi)
  - Households: 8,201
- Demonym: Canamanon

Economy
  - Income class: 3rd municipal income class
  - Poverty incidence: 18.09% (2023)
  - Revenue: ₱ 152.6 million (2024)
  - Assets: ₱ 615.7 million (2024)
  - Expenditure: ₱ 139.9 million (2024)
  - Liabilities: ₱ 153.4 million (2024)

Service provider
  - Electricity: Camarines Sur 2 Electric Cooperative (CASURECO 2)
- Time zone: UTC+8 (PST)
- ZIP code: 4402
- PSGC: 0501710000
- IDD : area code: +63 (0)54
- Native languages: Central Bikol; Tagalog

Canaman, officially the Municipality of Canaman (Central Bikol: Banwaan kan Canaman; Tagalog: Bayan ng Canaman), is a municipality in the province of Camarines Sur, Philippines. According to the 2024 census, it has a population of 35,766 people.

It is known for its upscale shopping, heritage which dates back to Spanish era, and its new first class housings.

== Etymology ==
The area that is now Canaman used to be very thickly forested. According to Fr. Frank Lynch, S.J., who said that Canaman is the purest among Bicol dialects: “The name Canaman is locally said to be derived from the root kana, meaning "building materials". The suffix -man is taken as a locative, the name thus indicating “place where there are building materials”. In the book, Canaman through Four Centuries (2009) written by Danilo M. Gerona, the historian argues that the etymology of the town's name came from a kind of wood used as a decorative material.

== History ==
Spanish colonization in Canaman began around the 1580s when Nueva Caceres missionaries were returning from gospel work in either the visita of Quipayo (now Calabanga) or San Gabriel (now a barangay of Pamplona). Their incorrect bearings had led them to believe that they had entered the tributary of Nueva Caceres. Instead, they had entered the Canaman creek which was a rapid and deep stream, prompting them to paddle until they had ended up at a native settlement in what is now the barangay of Poro.

In June 1583, it was organized into a parish, administered by Fray Pedro Matias de Andrade, a Franciscan who later became the fifth Bishop of Diocese of Caceres. In the 1590s, its church was constructed, which was rebuilt in 1669. The patron saint at that time was San Roque, whose image said to have come all the way from Spain was met at its arrival by the people of Canaman in Pasacao.

=== Philippine-American War ===
In 1900, after militant Canamanons heard that the Americans were closing in, they burned the church to the ground in an act of self-immolation to prevent desecration of the church at the hands of the American forces. The burning was a deliberate and intentional act; with the perpetrators gathering and piling dry grass on top of the church's organ and tree boughs to amplify the propagation of fire of the 231-year-old building.

In 1902, during the provincial governorship of Captain George Curry, the Municipality of Canaman and its office of the presidente municipal was dissolved and lost its municipal independence. Canaman was annexed to Nueva Caceres (now Naga), though some barrios were attached to Magarao and Canaman's concurrent top position of presidente municipal was downgraded to concejal encargado.

The American-institutionalized public educational system reached Canaman in 1903 with the arrival of Miss Long, an American schoolteacher. She opened the first public school, now the Canaman Central School in Dinaga, at the house of Don Basilio Severo (where the remnants of the Facoma Rice Mill are located) which the local government rented.

In 1909, Canaman regained its status as an independent municipality, initially when it was separated from Nueva Caceres by an act of the First Philippine Legislature. This was mainly due to the efforts of Tomas Arejola, the representative of the first district of Ambos Camarines to the first legislature.

=== World War II ===
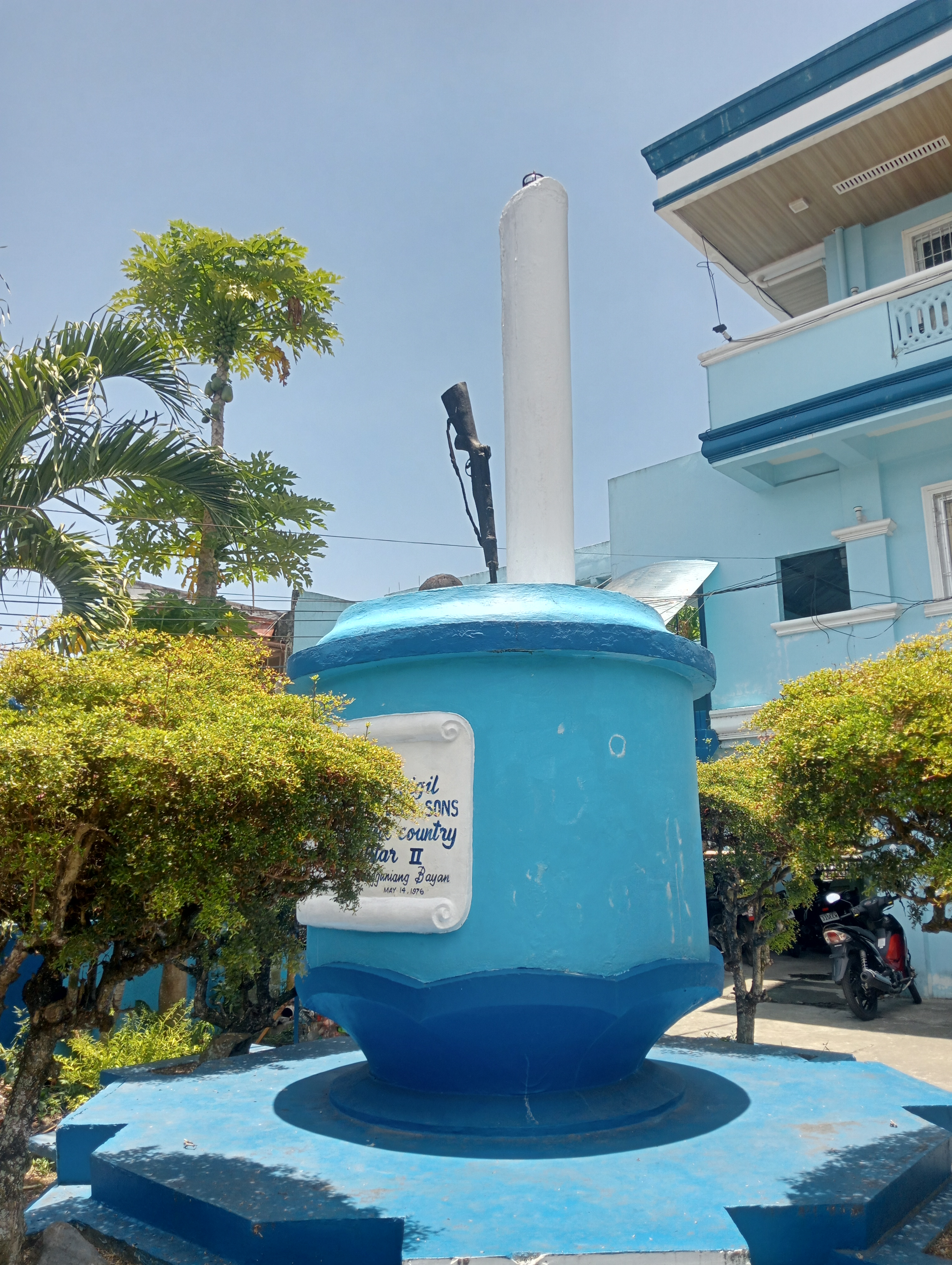
World War 2 Memorial Monument in Canaman

On March 8, 1942, three months after Japanese Imperial Forces landed in Legaspi and Naga City, the Tangcong Vaca Guerilla Unit (TVGU) was organized in Barangay San Nicolas, with Juan Miranda as the Commanding Officer, Leon Aureus as the Executive Officer and Elias Madrid as the Finance Officer.

Among the numerous Canamanons who joined up soon afterwards either in the unit's intelligence or combat components were Jose and Antonio Madrid, Mamerto Sibulo, Andres Fortaleza, Marcos Severo, Damaso Avenilla, Federico Crescini, Nicolas Vargas, Venancio Begino, Eugenio Ragodon, Juan Pachica, Santiago Amaro, Jose Gervas, Pedro Angeles, Aproniano Lopez, Andres Alzate, Modesto Sanchez, Blas Alcantara, Andres Aguilar, Florencio Frondozo, Alfredo de la Torre and Flaviano Estrada.

In April 1945, Canaman was liberated by the 5th, 52nd, 53rd, 55th, 56th and 57th Infantry Divisions of the Philippine Commonwealth Army and the Bicolano guerrilla resistance fighters of the Tangcong Vaca Guerrilla Unit (TVGU).

== Geography ==
A landlocked municipality centrally located in the province of Camarines Sur, it is bounded on the north by Magarao, on the south by Gainza and Camaligan, on the east by Naga City, and on the south-west by the broad Bicol River. From north to south it is 6 kilometres (3.7 mi) long, and 14 kilometres (8.7 mi) wide from east to west.

=== Climate ===
Climate data for Canaman, Camarines Sur
Month	Jan	Feb	Mar	Apr	May	Jun	Jul	Aug	Sep	Oct	Nov	Dec	Year
Mean daily maximum °C (°F)	32 (90)	31 (88)	34 (93)	36 (97)	37 (99)	37 (99)	36 (97)	34 (93)	35 (95)	34 (93)	33 (91)	32 (90)	34 (94)
Mean daily minimum °C (°F)	27 (81)	27 (81)	29 (84)	31 (88)	32 (90)	32 (90)	31 (88)	30 (86)	30 (86)	29 (84)	28 (82)	28 (82)	30 (85)
Average precipitation mm (inches)	39.34 (1.55)	68.7 (2.70)	26.73 (1.05)	66.19 (2.61)	84.49 (3.33)	178.89 (7.04)	244.27 (9.62)	188.3 (7.41)	160.98 (6.34)	445 (17.5)	135.5 (5.33)	367.8 (14.48)	2,006.19 (78.96)
Average rainy days	16	18	13	15	23	28	30	24	26	27	25	29	274
Source: World Weather Online (modeled/calculated data, not measured locally)

=== Barangays ===
Canaman is politically subdivided into 24 barangays. Each barangay consists of puroks and some have sitios.

- Baras (Poblacion)
- Del Rosario
- Dinaga (Poblacion)
- Fundado
- Haring
- Iquin
- Linaga
- Mangayawan
- Palo
- Pangpang (Poblacion)
- Poro
- San Agustin
- San Francisco
- San Jose East
- San Jose West
- San Juan
- San Nicolas
- San Roque
- San Vicente
- Santa Cruz (Poblacion)
- Santa Teresita
- Sua
- Talidtid
- Tibgao (Poblacion)

== Demographics ==
Population census of Canaman

Year	Pop.	±% p.a.
1918	3,710	—
1939	5,592	+1.97%
1948	9,032	+5.47%
1960	8,988	−0.04%
1970	12,422	+3.28%
1975	14,522	+3.18%
1980	15,787	+1.68%
1990	20,298	+2.55%

Year	Pop.	±% p.a.
1995	22,732	+2.14%
2000	27,719	+4.34%
2007	31,583	+1.82%
2010	32,390	+0.92%
2015	34,210	+1.05%
2020	36,205	+1.20%
2024	35,766	−0.29%

Source: Philippine Statistics Authority

In the 2024 census, the population of Canaman was 35,766 people, with a density of 830 inhabitants per square kilometre or 2,100 inhabitants per square mile.

Rapid urbanization is a primary result of Canaman's commercial opportunity for inhabitants west of the municipality, deflating the congruence of population from western localities. The rising demand of basic public utilities in predominantly rural-based barangays has extended urbanization far from the central poblacion and arterial urban corridors.

== Government ==
Canaman municipal officials (2022–2025)
Name	Party
Mayor
Nelson Medrano Legaspi	PDP–Laban
Vice Mayor
Venancio Barrosa Regulado	PDP–Laban
Councilors
Joel Joseph Bombais Abante	NPC
Larry Nico Madlangbayan Basmayor	NPC
Myrna Frondozo Cantillo	PDP–Laban
Leonardo Alio Morallos	PDP–Laban
Dionisio Genovana Corporal	PDP–Laban
Joselita Letada Ocampo	PDP–Laban
Ruel Bermal Espiritu	PDP–Laban
Alexsis Duran Capsa	PDP–Laban
Ex Officio Municipal Council Members
ABC President	Danilo D. Ochoa
SK President	Brian M. San Joaquin

== Economy ==
Poverty incidence of Canaman (%)

Source: Philippine Statistics Authority

Canaman has the lowest poverty rate in the province of Camarines Sur. There are still urban sprawls present throughout unmaintained localities within the municipality, usually resulting in the denigration of infrastructure and stagnating local growth in certain barangays. The impoverished communities in Canaman throughout the years have seen somewhat of a reformation as accessibility to higher education have increased the standards of living and conceptions of perceptions more tolerant of education.

Canaman is 3 km east of Naga City and is primarily a residential municipality. Suburbs have been built all over the town such as Leticia Heights, Villa Salvacion, RJ Village, Peace Village, and Progress Homes.

Some provincial offices are located in the town such as Mariners College, CAAP, and DPWH.

Agriculture, fishing, and small business are the primary sources of employment and household income.

While most of the people's market activities are done in Naga City, Canaman has a public market and a privately owned "talipapa". Two agro-industrial establishments are found in Canaman: the poultry feeds and palay.

Various types of cottage industries like handicraft, furniture, fan making (made of anahaw), ragiwdiw and nipa shingles are conducted in this town.

In 1998, it was recorded that agricultural workers made up only 27.3% of the work force while 70.8% were engaged in non-agricultural activities. 88.38% of the total land area is devoted to agriculture.

In 2014, Canaman Dragon Boat Camp was launched in the village of Mangayawan along the Bicol River which serves as the turf of the Bicol River Hot Paddlers.

Canaman was formerly included in the Metro Naga area before the designation was discontinued in 2017.

=== Agriculture ===
Agriculture remains the cornerstone of Canaman's economy, with 71.7% of the total land area of the municipality, covering 3,101 hectares, used for agricultural purposes. 51% of this is irrigated and generated P126,243,400 of value in 2011, while 48.16% is non-irrigated and generated P96,771,000 of economic output.

Decrease in volume of production is a key issue in this sector. Low production could be accounted to typhoon, flood, saline intrusion, pests and diseases and also due to excessive use of synthetic fertilizers. Ongoing programs to work with farmers regarding synchronized planting, composting instead of burning of rice straws, shifting towards the organic farming approach, diversified and integrated farming and the use of high yielding varieties are needed, such as those being showcased at the Canaman Livelihood Centre at Sta Cruz.

Farming, fishing, employment and small business are the primary sources of most household income of in the municipality. It is estimated that more than 60 percent of the households depend in agriculture and agriculture related activities for their main livelihood. Bicol River Basin Management Project in 1950s envisioned to deliver unprecedented improvement in the economic life not only of Canaman but the entire district.

=== Abaniko-making ===
Various types of small cottage industries like handicraft, furniture, tiklad making are also conducted in this town to augment household income, and are considered as minor activities. Taga-Canaman have valued the uses of Livistona rotundifolia or anahaw, National Leaf of the Philippines, and its cultural significance. They have also recognized its importance, albeit not indigenous, to their livelihood. Anahaw does not only serve as raw material for roof shingles but it has also become an alternate material for other forms of products such as bags, purse, mats, slippers, costumes and others. Abaniko fan making in Canaman started in the 1960s in barangay Sta. Cruz as a leisure pursuit by Macario Adolfo and wife Victoria Bobis.

=== Commercial and Services Sector ===
The economic relationship between Canaman, similarly with other contigious municipalities of Camarines Sur, and neighbouring Naga had historically maintained a socio-economical mutuality due to Naga's regional economic prominence, temporarily ratified by the policies of the Metropolitan under Jesse Robredo's term, and the nearby municipalities output of essential resources for local production and manpower, spanning from Naga's educational superiority, job opportunities, and consumerist developments.

Small sari-sari stores are also prevalent in all barangays while big business establishments are sprouting in barangays adjacent to Naga City and along the national highway. Among the notable Small-Medium Enterprises (SMEs) located in the municipality are Arrow Feeds Corporation in barangay San Vicente, Daluro Shell Station in San Agustin and J. Emmanuel Pastries in barangay Haring. The Canaman Public Market serves as the hub of economic activities in the poblacion area.

=== Poblacion ===
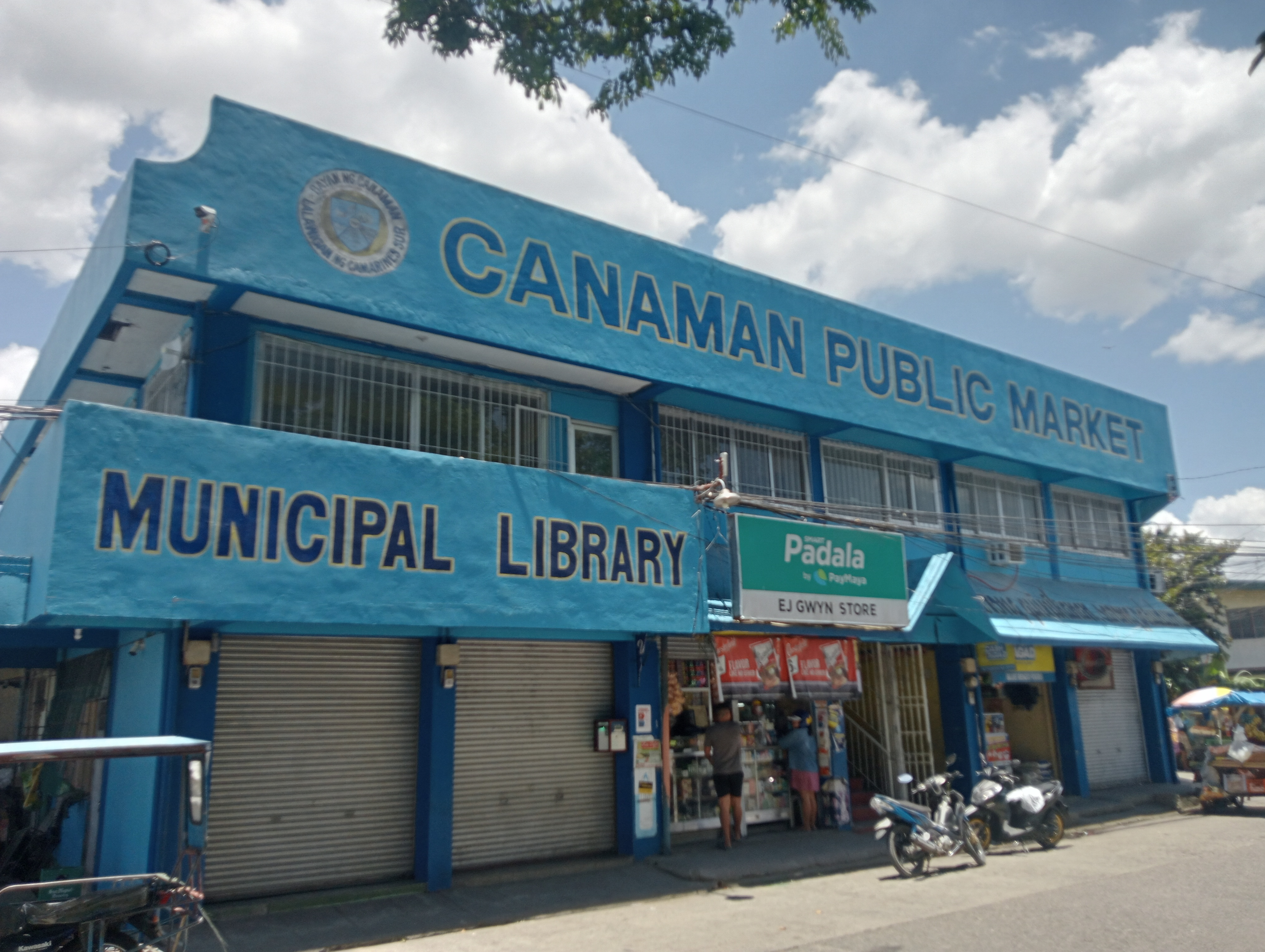
Canaman Public Market

Taga-canamans tend to shop at the malls in Naga City due to its proximity. While historically, goods were cheaper in Naga, a growing number of wholesalers are opening in the poblacion area, Pangpang, equalizing the low cost as Naga's. The rundown Market is located in the heart of the poblacion area, systematically adjoined to key community facilities such as the municipal health clinic, library, post office and within a short walk from the church, school, public plaza multi-purpose pavement and municipal hall.

While anecdotal evidence suggests there is unmet demand for additional and larger commercial developments in Canaman, it is important that these are located and developed in ways that do not undermine the Canaman Public Market's role as the anchor land use in the poblacion area.

A boost to Canaman's image as an emerging entertainment center came with the establishment of radio industry in the 1950s. ABS-CBN's DZRB radio station pioneered broadcasting industry in Camarines Sur. The station became the center of talented local broadcasters who became big men in the broadcast media industry. Within the area, Senator Edmundo B. Cea from Tigaon set up DZGE and later DWEB, the first local AM and FM radio stations in Bicol region. Nordia Complex, an entertainment district composed of a hotel resort and a cockpit arena was constructed the following decade. It became one of the major destinations of local travelers until the early 1990s.

=== Eco-tourism ===
Canaman's strategically rustic geography is an attraction to investors of eco-tourism, primarily enterprising tourist farms throughout the municipality. The increasing eco-tourism coincided with commercial growth and urbanization of underdeveloped pockets, typically the eastern half of Canaman facing the western bank of the Bicol River.

=== Housing projects, real estate, and land use ===
Canaman serves as the third urban center after the Daet-Naga-Legazpi-Iriga urban corridor. The barangays of Baras, Haring, San Agustin, San Vicente and Del Rosario are the primary hotspots for real estate development, with construction of subdivisions across the acquired land increasing in consistency with prevalence. Warehouses and other industrial facilities are outsourced from Naga-based enterprises within the contigious perimeter of the Naga-Canaman boundaries.

Several subdivisions can also be found in Canaman such as Progress Homes, RJ Village, Nueva Caceres Subdivision, Villa Salvacion, Leticia Heights and others. A number of institutions from different sectors of the society including Mariners Polytechnic Colleges Foundation, Aeronautical Academy of the Philippines, Kolping Society, Church of Latter Day Saints, Our Lady of Prompt Succor, and several private preparatory schools have sprouted in the municipality.

== Culture ==
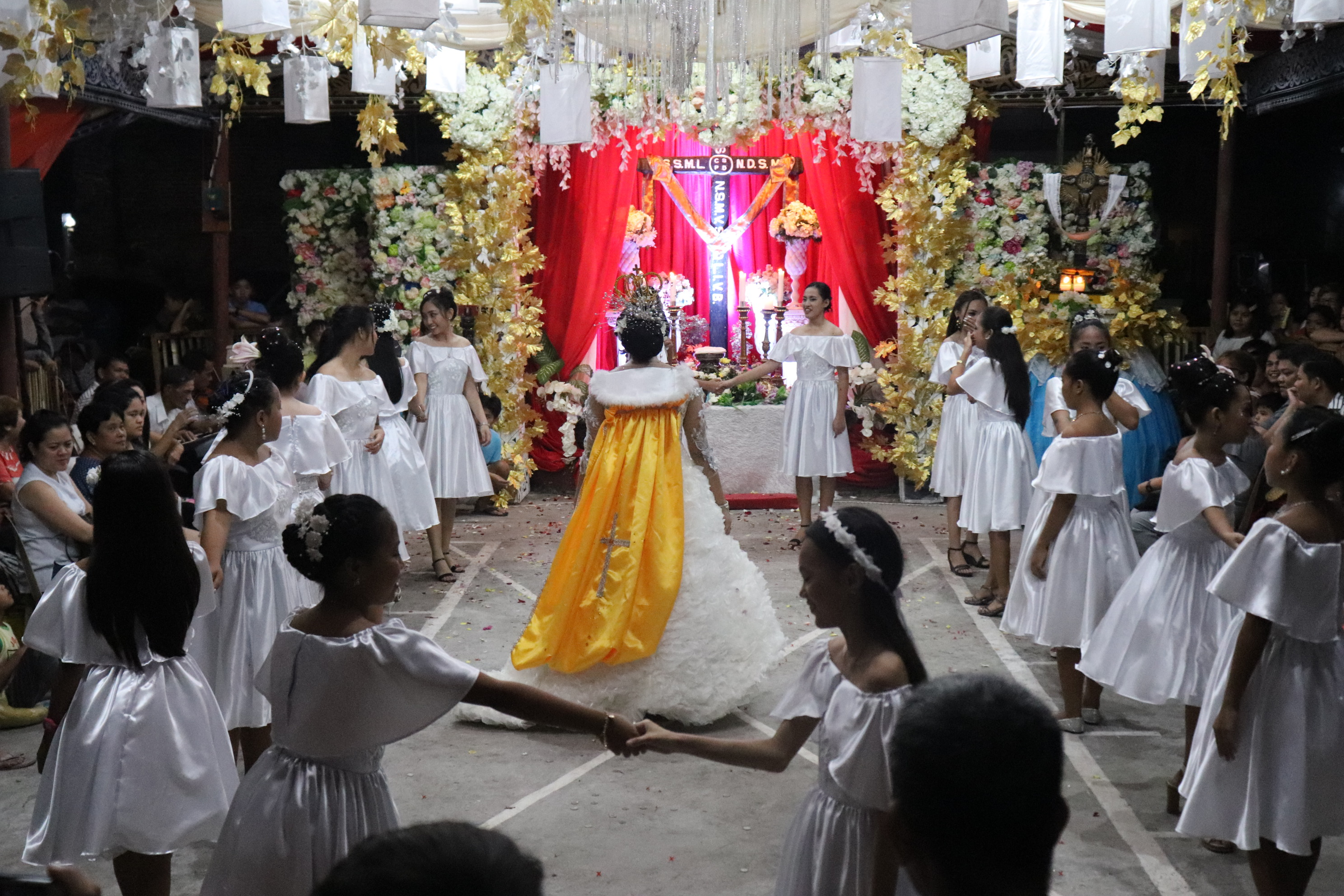
Lagaylay Festival held each May

Every month of May, the community honors the Holy Cross through Lagaylay, a tradition which began over a century ago. For nine nights, women dance on the church or a chapel's square while chanting prayers to the Cross.

== Transportation ==
=== Jeepney Routes ===
The Express Jeepney stop from Canaman to Naga City is located beside the Canaman Rural Health Unit (RHU) on the corner of the Talidtid intersection:

Regular fees cost ₱13 per passenger, while discounted fees, issued exclusively to students, senior citizens and PWDs, are lowered to ₱11 per passenger.

Early morning PUV express citybound lines start at 6:00 AM and with final journeys at 9:00 PM, often coincided with local jeepneys travelling down Canaman Rd. to collect far commuters.

The usual citybound line travels down Canaman Rd., then entering the outskirts of Naga via Bagumbayan Norte and Bagumbayan Sur, arriving at downtown Centro Naga through Jacob St., Elias Angeles St. and at its terminus for Canaman-Naga commuters on Diaz St, located beside the Downtown District Building.

Homebound journeys proceed from the Northbound Jeepney Terminal by Queborac Drive, Bagumbayan Norte. An optional free-of-charge service bound for the Terminal is available at Diaz St., appealing to Naga Centro commuters as an alternative to intermittent northbound tricycles. The Canaman homebound line is located on the third platform at the Northbound Jeepney Terminal.

Final Northbound Jeepney Terminal journeys occur late in the afternoon, usually at around 5:30 - 6:00 PM. Night-time terminus operations shifts to the stop on Barlin-Diaz St., beside the Graceland HR Office, at around 6:00 - 6:30 PM.

=== Road Condition ===
Most of the roads and main streets in the poblacion (urban barangays) are concrete with few earth and gravel roads, 4 can be reached only through water transportation while 11 can be reached either through water transportation and/or by land transportation.

== Education ==
The Canaman Schools District Office governs all educational institutions within the municipality. It oversees the management and operations of all private and public, from primary to secondary schools.

=== Primary and elementary schools ===
- Calambog Elementary School
- Canaman Central School
- Fundado Elementary School
- Haring Elementary School (Main)
- Haring San Agustin Elementary School (Annex)
- Hansel & Gretel Foundation
- Iquin Elementary School
- Kurtland Grade School
- Lighthouse Baptist Education Center
- Linaga Elem School
- Mangayawan Elementary School
- Poro Elementary School
- San Francisco Elementary School
- San Jose West Primary School
- San Juan Elementary School
- San Nicolas Elementary School
- Sua Elementary School
- Tacolod Elementary School (Main)
- Tacolod Elementary School (Annex)
- Talidtid Elementary School

=== Secondary schools ===
- Kurtland Grade School
- Lighthouse Baptist Education Center
- Mangayawan National High School
- Northern Canaman High School
- Palo Integrated School
- Ryden International Technological Institute
- Sta. Cruz National High School

== Notable personalities ==
- Juan Q. Miranda, politician
- Rez Cortez, assistant director, actor
- Rachel Peters, pageant titlist who represented the Philippines at Miss Universe 2017
- Ramona Isabel Ramirez, 4th president of Central Bicol State University of Agriculture
