= Pamplona, Camarines Sur =

Municipality in Camarines Sur, Philippines

Pamplona
- Municipality
- Municipality of Pamplona
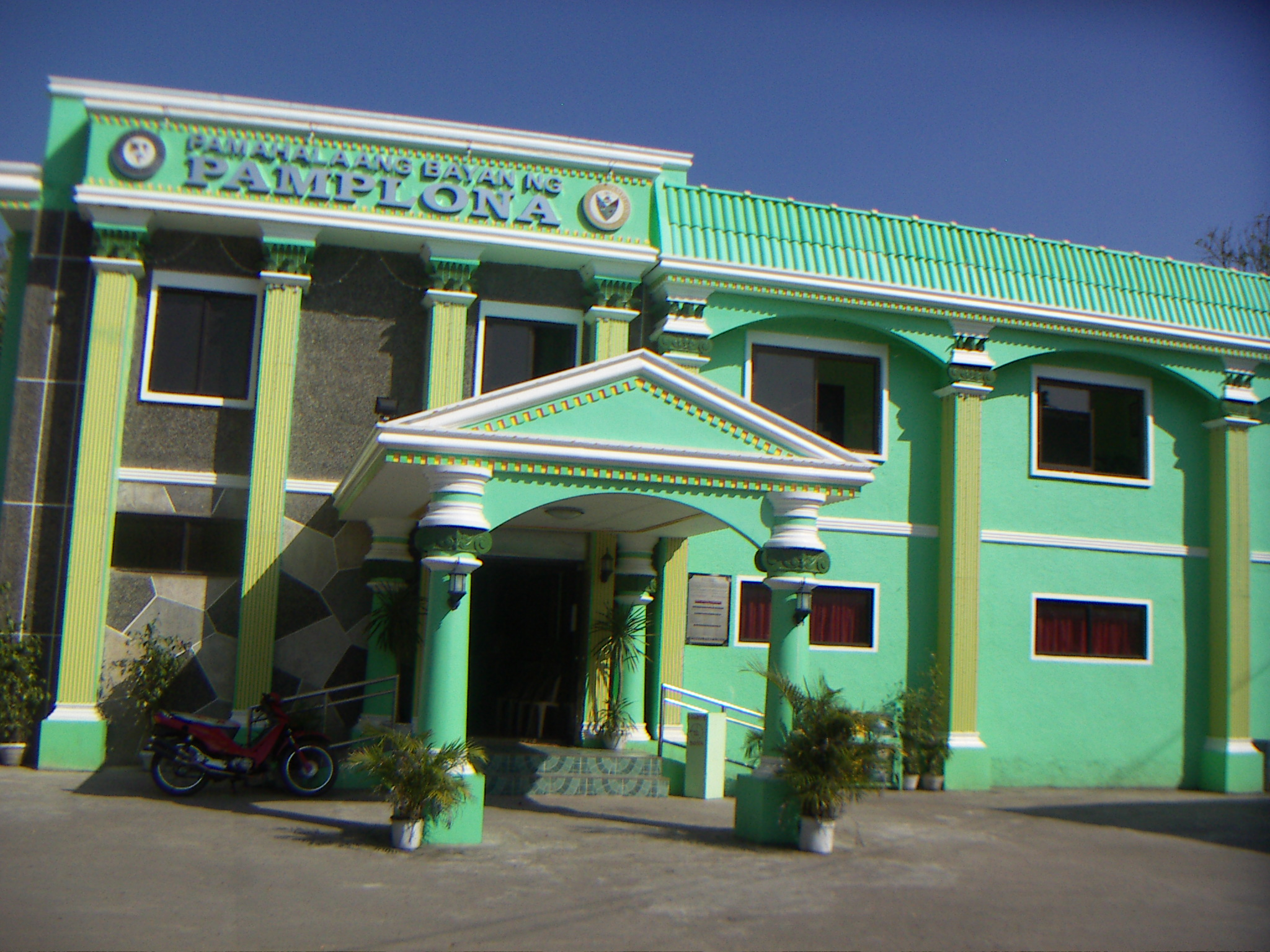
- Municipal Hall

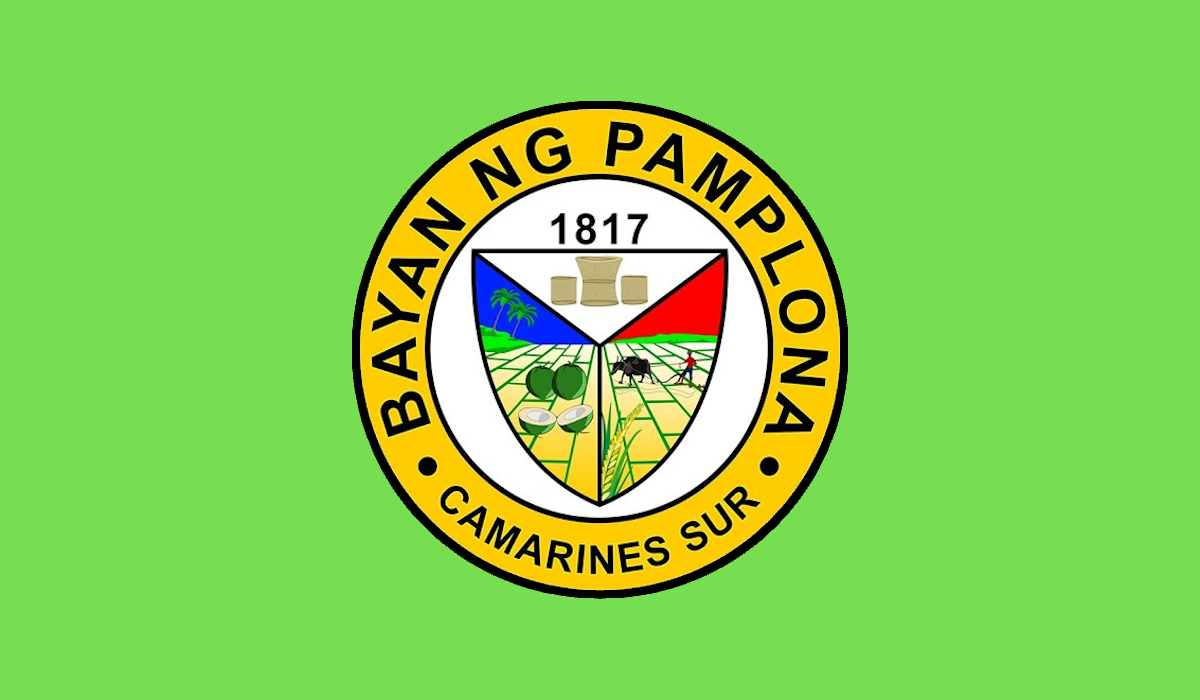
- Flag

- Map of Camarines Sur with Pamplona highlighted
- Interactive map of Pamplona
- Location within the Philippines
- Coordinates: 13°35′33″N 123°05′00″E
- Country: Philippines
- Region: Bicol Region
- Province: Camarines Sur
- District: 2nd district
- Founded: May 8, 1817
- Barangays: 17 (see Barangays)

Government
  - Type: Sangguniang Bayan
  - Mayor: Manuel O. Agustin
  - Vice Mayor: Ronaldo F. Franco
  - Representative: Luis Raymund F. Villafuerte Jr.
  - Municipal Council: Members: DURANTE, SIR DODONG; CRUZ, ACE; CAPUCAO, AGNES; BUTIAL, ELLA; BORDON, BOYET; AQUINO, JERRY; ANGELES, ALEN; PRAXIDIO, RODILENE
  - Electorate: 24,626 voters (2025)

Area
  - Total: 80.60 km^{2} (31.12 sq mi)
- Elevation: 21 m (69 ft)
- Highest elevation: 191 m (627 ft)
- Lowest elevation: −1 m (−3.3 ft)

Population (2024 census)
  - Total: 38,556
  - Density: 478.4/km^{2} (1,239/sq mi)
  - Households: 8,637

Economy
  - Income class: 3rd municipal income class
  - Poverty incidence: 29.99% (2023)
  - Revenue: ₱ 170.4 million (2024)
  - Assets: ₱ 637.7 million (2024)
  - Expenditure: ₱ 181.7 million (2024)
  - Liabilities: ₱ 80.84 million (2024)

Service provider
  - Electricity: Camarines Sur 1 Electric Cooperative (CASURECO 1)
- Time zone: UTC+8 (PST)
- ZIP code: 4416
- PSGC: 0501726000
- IDD : area code: +63 (0)54
- Native languages: Central Bikol; Tagalog

Pamplona, officially the Municipality of Pamplona (Central Bikol: Banwaan kan Pamplona; Tagalog: Bayan ng Pamplona), is a municipality in the province of Camarines Sur, Philippines. According to the 2024 census, it has a population of 38,556 people.

== History ==
The beginnings of this town can be traced back from the date it was made a visita of Milaor. The town of Pamplona was founded on May 8, 1817. It first started as a settlement west of the Bicol River, then it grew to become a Sitio called Patong. The name was changed to Pamplona by a retired Spanish military officer who resided in the place and named it after his native city in Spain - Pamplona, capital of the province of Navarre.

Pamplona officially became a parish on May 8, 1885, which coincided with the date of the town's celebration honoring their patron saint, Saint Michael the Archangel.

== Geography ==
=== Barangays ===
Pamplona is politically subdivided into 17 barangays. Each barangay consists of puroks and some have sitios.

- Batang
- Burabod
- Cagbibi
- Cagbunga
- Calawat
- Del Rosario
- Patong
- Poblacion
- Salvacion
- San Gabriel
- San Isidro
- San Rafael
- San Ramon
- San Vicente
- Veneracion (Taguilid)
- Tambo
- Tampadong

=== Climate ===
Climate data for Pamplona, Camarines Sur
Month	Jan	Feb	Mar	Apr	May	Jun	Jul	Aug	Sep	Oct	Nov	Dec	Year
Mean daily maximum °C (°F)	33 (91)	31 (88)	35 (95)	37 (99)	38 (100)	37 (99)	36 (97)	34 (93)	35 (95)	34 (93)	33 (91)	32 (90)	35 (94)
Mean daily minimum °C (°F)	27 (81)	27 (81)	29 (84)	31 (88)	32 (90)	32 (90)	30 (86)	29 (84)	30 (86)	29 (84)	28 (82)	28 (82)	29 (85)
Average precipitation mm (inches)	44.2 (1.74)	53.17 (2.09)	45.43 (1.79)	54.15 (2.13)	92.29 (3.63)	182.23 (7.17)	289.11 (11.38)	260.6 (10.26)	180.07 (7.09)	340.22 (13.39)	98.7 (3.89)	337.4 (13.28)	1,977.57 (77.84)
Average rainy days	21	22	19	19	24	26	30	29	27	29	24	29	299
Source: World Weather Online

As part of the Bicol Region, the municipality has a tropical climate favorable to agriculture. The fields remain lush-green throughout the year, even through a long drought period. Generally, there are only two distinct seasons, namely: dry and wet season. The dry season starts from about the middle or later part of January up to April and the wet season starts from May to December.

== Demographics ==
Population census of Pamplona
Year	Pop.	±% p.a.
1903	3,993	—
1918	3,477	−0.92%
1939	7,402	+3.66%
1948	9,439	+2.74%
1960	13,028	+2.72%
1970	15,922	+2.02%
1975	18,350	+2.89%
1980	19,651	+1.38%
1990	24,097	+2.06%
1995	26,176	+1.56%
2000	29,177	+2.35%
2007	31,895	+1.24%
2010	34,471	+2.87%
2015	36,390	+1.04%
2020	39,333	+1.65%
2024	38,556	−0.48%
Source: Philippine Statistics Authority

In the 2024 census, the population of Pamplona was 38,556 people, with a density of 480 inhabitants per square kilometre or 1,200 inhabitants per square mile.

== Economy ==
Poverty incidence of Pamplona (%)

Source: Philippine Statistics Authority

Farming is considered to be the main source of livelihood and basically agriculture is the primary source where most households derive their income. The agricultural products includes coconuts, upland crops and rice. Agricultural workers outnumbering the ones who are employed in non-agricultural occupations. As of 1997, 66.2% are engaged in agricultural works while 33.8% make up the non-agricultural labor force.

Industries include cottage industries and bamboo furniture industry with agricultural equipment manufacturer found in Barangay San Gabriel, making portable hand tractors, palay threshers, and portable wind blowers. The rehabilitation of farm-to-market roads was started to link the barangays to the trade and commerce industry. This will facilitate the transport of farm products and farm inputs.

Pamplona is progressive due to its proximity to Pasacao port and the ever expanding Metro Naga. Industrial plants, Resorts, Agriculture, being along the national road had create Pamplona to become the potential commercial center of Camarines Sur's second congressional district. An ongoing project around Barangay Tambo is a 2-story mall with dining, parking, and hospital the end of the construction will be around the first and second quarter of 2025.

Due to its proximity to Naga City. Pamplona now hosts a Business Industrial Park owned by both the LGU and Winwin Corporation named 'Winwin Business Park'. This Business Park is a 52 hectare project in Barangay Del Rosario. As of January 2023 the Business Park has a hotel, resort, gas station, Land Transportation Office, and several private running factories. The project although not complete yet will also compose of residential buildings and shopping malls. This project will not only benefit the people of Pamplona but also the entire 1st and 2nd districts.

Pamplona's OTOP is Bag Making. Three Barangays named San Gabriel, San Vicente and Tambo function as neighborhood centers with Tambo only being secondary to Poblacion having its own market.

The town was formerly included in the Metro Naga area before the designation was discontinued in 2017.

== Tourism ==
Pamplona has a scenic view from one of its hills. Pamplona has the Bicol hot Paddlers too from the neighbouring town of Canaman. A tourism area as they share the economy of Pamplona.

=== Churches ===
- San Miguel Arcángel Parish (est.1885)

== Education ==
The Pamplona Schools District Office governs all educational institutions within the municipality. It oversees the management and operations of all private and public, from primary to secondary schools.

The town has four barangay high school in San Vicente, San Isidro, Poblacion and Veneracion. It also has 11 barangay elementary school and two primary schools.

== Sports ==
Pamplona has many high school basketball courts. Poblacion area has the new sports arena that opened in May 2019. Many children often start playing ball at a young age. Aside from basketball there are many sports. Football is an example. Football is a game usually played in the farm areas.

== Transportation ==
Pamplona has a small transport terminal near the public market. The terminal operates daily from Libmanan to Naga City, and even the regional center of Legazpi City. The train tracks which still runs today. However some roads and railroads need to be fixed first.

== Education ==
The Pamplona Schools District Office governs all educational institutions within the municipality. It oversees the management and operations of all private and public, from primary to secondary schools.

=== Primary and elementary schools ===
- Ahisamach Christian Academy
- Batang Elementary School
- Brilliant Learners School
- Burabod Elementary School
- Cagbunga Elementary School
- Calawat Elementary School
- Calawat Primary School
- Del Rosario Elementary School
- Pamplona Central School
- Patong Elementary School
- Salvacion Elementary School
- San Gabriel Elementary School
- San Isidro Elementary School
- San Ramon Elementary School
- San Vicente Elementary School
- Taguilid Elementary School
- Tambo Elementary School
- Tampadong Elementary School

=== Secondary schools ===
- Cagbibi National High School
- Del Rosario National High School
- Don M. Veneracion National High School
- Maura N. Sibulo National High School
- Pamplona National High School
- Ramon B. Felipe Sr. National High School

== Notable personalities ==
- Annie Ramirez - Filipino Jujutsu practitioner
- Angelica Panganiban - Filipino actress and vlogger

== Sister cities ==
- (Philippines) Milaor, Camarines Sur
- (Philippines) San Fernando, Camarines Sur
- (Philippines) Cabusao, Camarines Sur
- (Philippines) Bato, Camarines Sur
- (Philippines) Pagbilao, Quezon Province
- (Philippines) Talisay, Camarines Norte
