= Metro Naga =

- Metropolitan area
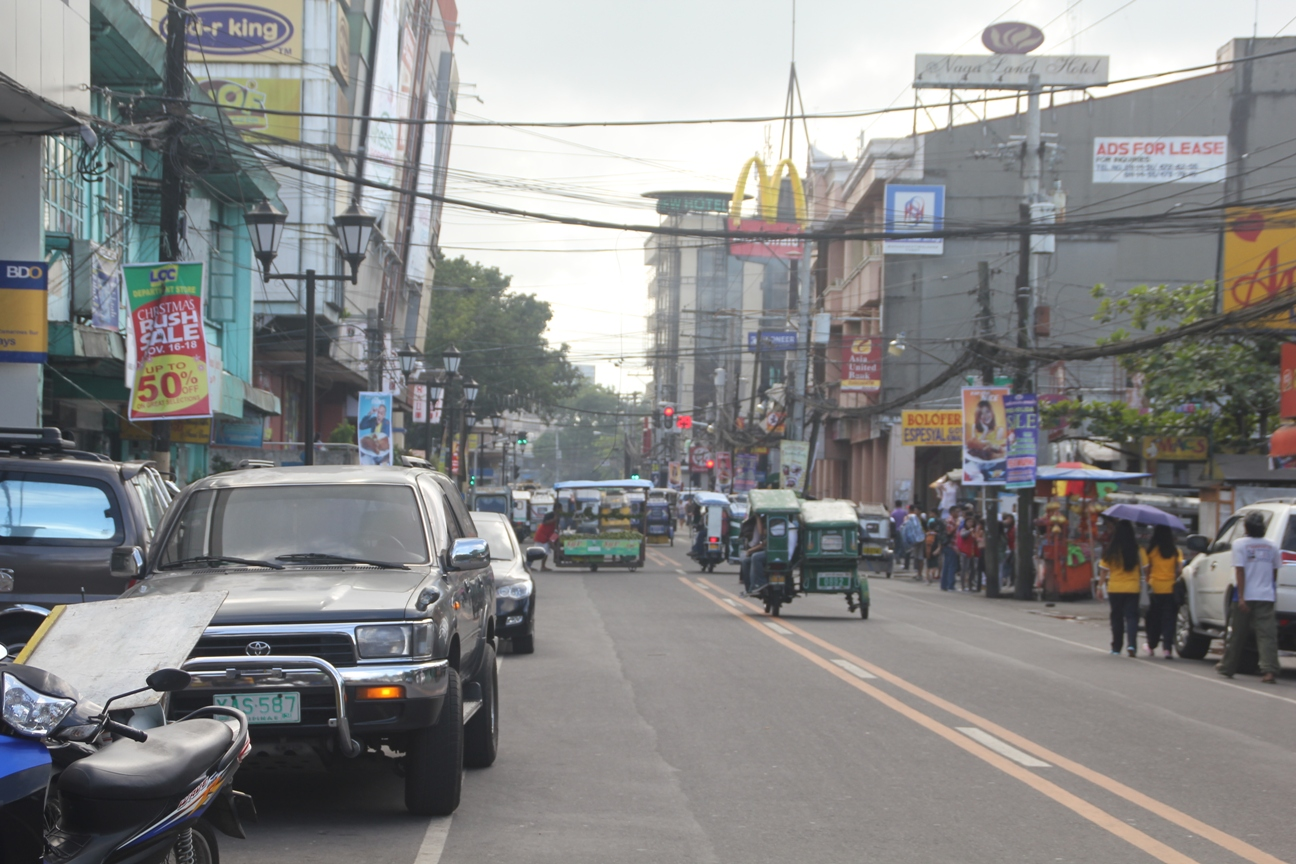
- Elias Angeles Street in Naga

- Metro Naga in Camarines Sur
- Interactive map of Metro Naga
- Map of the Philippines
- Coordinates: 13°37′N 123°10′E
- Country: Philippines
- Region: Bicol Region (Region V)
- Province: Camarines Sur
- Established: June 18, 1993
- Subdivisions: 15 LGUs (1 city, 14 municipalities)

Area
  - Total: 1,342.01 km^{2} (518.15 sq mi)

Population (2020)
  - Total: 858,414
  - Density: 639.648/km^{2} (1,656.68/sq mi)
- Time zone: UTC+8 (PST)
- Website: Metro Naga Development Council

Metropolitan Naga was a metropolitan area in the Bicol Region of the Philippines that consisted of the city of Naga and its 14 neighboring municipalities in Camarines Sur. The metropolitan area, which was managed by the Metro Naga Development Council, also included Pili, the capital of the Camarines Sur, and covered most of the 3rd district of the province and part of its 1st, 2nd, 4th and 5th districts. Metro Naga comprised about 40% of the total population of the province while covering 22.9% of its area.

In 2017, the National Economic and Development Authority (NEDA) reduced the number of metropolitan areas in the Philippines from 12 to 9. The reclassification removed the metropolitan status of Metro Naga.

Naga's surrounding towns make up the Urban Metro Naga. It comprises Magarao, Canaman, Camaligan, Gainza, and Milaor. Urban Metro Naga was created on June 11, 2009, by Mayor Jesse Robredo in order to have stronger relationships with other town mayors. It is also the most heavily industrialized part of Camarines Sur. Urban Metro Naga's latest population according to the 2020 census is 342,768 people.

== History ==
When there came a world oil crisis in 1991 as a result of the Gulf War, developmental planners in Naga and its surrounding municipalities had to rethink their goal and direction. They had to address more of their commonality rather than their diversity and focus on resource sharing rather than politicking.

Inasmuch as almost all of the gasoline stations in Metro Naga are located in Naga, its then city mayor convened the mayors of the adjacent municipalities to map out their needs and priorities in setting the system and procedure for rationing available fuel supply. The resulting scheme kept vital services running and its success paved the way for other cooperative efforts and undertakings, all leading to the creation of an institution — the Metro Naga Development Council — that would address these cross-boundary issues and problems.

Another impetus was the enactment of the Local Government Code (LGC) of 1991 which mandated the absorption of devolved personnel, creating chaos in the budgets of many Local government units (LGUs). Again, the mayors of Naga and its neighboring municipalities held informal meetings to share experiences and formulate common strategies to overcome the initial difficulties that accompanied the implementation of the LGC.

Then the senior citizens of the neighboring municipalities clamored that they also be granted the same benefits enjoyed by their colleagues in Naga. As early as 1989, Naga has had in place a senior citizens program that granted the elderly various discounts from public institutions and private establishments. The mayors again met, "Metro Naga" was coined, and the Metro Naga Senior Citizens League was subsequently formed to facilitate the grant of discount privileges to Metro Naga elderly. This was the third event.

Soon after, requests for the use of the city's heavy equipment came from the municipal mayors bringing to the fore the need for a mechanism to facilitate such sharing of resources between the city and its neighbors. The new LGC gave the answer with its grant of expanded powers and prerogatives to LGUs allowing them to pool their efforts and resources for commonly beneficial projects and activities. A task force was formed to study the mechanics for the exercise of such powers.

What was left was to forge a memorandum of agreement (MOA) formally detailing the covenants of roles and responsibilities of the different LGUs, and to have the MOA approved by their respective legislative councils. This MOA was signed on April 23, 1993, in Naga with then Secretary Rafael Alunan III of the Department of Interior and Local Government as principal witness.

Thus was born the Metro Naga Development Council, a cooperative effort necessitated by the stinging side effects of the Gulf War that later evolved into a partnership for the joint development of 15 LGUs. This local initiative was affirmed by then President Ramos himself through Executive Order No. 102 issued on June 18, 1993.

== Cities and municipalities ==
Local government unit	Population (2015 census)	Population (2020 census)	Population Growth	Area (km^{2})	Income Classification
Bombon	16,512	17,995	8.7%	28.73	4th class municipality
Bula	69,430	73,143	5.3%	167.64	1st class municipality
Calabanga	83,033	88,906	7.0%	163.80	1st class municipality
Camaligan	24,109	25,036	3.8%	4.68	4th class municipality
Canaman	34,210	36,205	5.8%	43.27	3rd class municipality
Gainza	11,262	11,584	2.8%	14.75	4th class municipality
Magarao	25,694	26,742	4.0%	44.97	3rd class municipality
Milaor	31,150	33,963	8.1%	33.64	3rd class municipality
Minalabac	52,390	53,981	3.0%	126.10	2nd class municipality
Naga	196,003	209,170	6.7%	84.48	1st class city
Ocampo	45,934	51,073	11.1%	118.33	2nd class municipality
Pamplona	36,390	39,333	9.7%	80.60	3rd class municipality
Pasacao	49,035	53,461	9.0%	149.54	2nd class municipality
Pili (provincial capital)	89,545	99,196	10.7%	126.25	1st class municipality
San Fernando	35,258	38,626	9.4%	71.76	2nd class municipality

== Transportation ==
Naga is very accessible by air, road and rail transport making the location an easy getaway destination. Philippine Airlines and Cebu Pacific fly twice daily each between Manila and Naga with a flight time of only 50 minutes.

By road, the area is connected with Manila by the Andaya Highway reducing travel time to only 6 hours and daily rail services to and from Manila are provided by the Philippine National Railways.

Metro Naga transport facilities provide as major gateways to Metro Manila, in the north, and to Metro Cebu, in the south. A fleet replacement incentive program for bus operators likewise modernized the buses serving the Bicol-Manila route. Combined, these enhanced the integration of Metro Naga's economy with the rest of the country.

In order to spur development in the Metro Naga area, The Toll Regulatory Board declared Toll Road 5 the extension of South Luzon Expressway. A 420-kilometer, four lane expressway starting from the terminal point of the now under construction SLEX Toll Road 4 at Barangay Mayao, Lucena City in Quezon to Matnog, Sorsogon, near the Matnog Ferry Terminal. On August 25, 2020, San Miguel Corporation announced that they will invest the project which will reduce travel time from Lucena to Matnog from 9 hours to 5.5 hours.

Another expressway that will serve Metro Naga is the Quezon-Bicol Expressway (QuBEx), which will link between Lucena and San Fernando, Camarines Sur.

== Economic Activity ==
Naga, Camarines Sur's economy is usually Commercial, Industrial, Social and tourism. Naga City, Camarines Sur has several CBDs. CBD 1 ore the downtown district has the Naga Public Market located in it. Many shops have opened in Downtown Naga City and food chains. CBD 2 which is where the Iconic mall of Naga City, SM City Naga. IBM Building is also located there IBM announced that Naga City will be the IT center of Bicol Region. The central Bicol station is also located there which operates daily from Naga City to areas such as Iriga City, Legazpi City, Gumaca, Quezon Province. Up next is the nightlife center of Camarines Sur. Magsaysay ave. where bars and restaurants are located. The Peñafrancia church is located there. The first condominium in Naga City, UMA Residences is located there and will operate late this 2022.

Naga City, however is not the only urban center in Metro Naga. Pili, Camarines Sur is where new buildings are located. The busiest airport in Bicol is located in the town. Due to rapid urbanization and high population growth Pili, Camarines Sur now hosts housing projects. By 2022 Pili will become a city. Aside from Naga City and Pili, Camarines Sur. Milaor which is now the area for potential development in the upcoming years. Canaman which also hosts housing projects and the future city of Canaman IT park presented by Megaworld Corporation. Camaligan which is the spillover of economic growth from Naga City. Pamplona has a proposed industrial site near the Poblacion area.

In terms of body of water, Naga City is landlocked. However, Naga has neighbouring towns with beaches and ports. The port of Sabang in Calabanga is the busiest in the region. Many fishermen get high salary from fishing in the waters of Calabanga. Pasacao which is the gateway to Camarines Sur the second busiest port in Camarines Sur. It serves both as a fishing port and a seaport. Also because of the Bicol River Naga City isn't fully landlocked.

== Power supply ==
Assuring the growth of Metro Naga's economy is the adequate supply of electricity. At present, four electric cooperatives combine to supply the area with stable power from the national grid.

The four electric utility firms operating in Metro Naga provide the area with a combined rated capacity of 55 MVA and are still expanding their networks by tapping into other renewable and cost-efficient sources of energy.

== Water supply ==
Metro Naga's lush forests are the main sources of potable water in the area. The major water utility firm in the area, the Metropolitan Naga Water District (MNWD), gets its water mainly from the three springs of Mount Isarog. Likewise, several mineral water bottling companies source their water from this mountain.

MNWD has a combined capacity of 1048.5 liters per second, while household demand is currently pegged at 465 liters per second. Other springs and groundwater are also tapped to supply the increasing demand for potable water for Metro Naga's industries and increasing population.

== Communication facilities ==
Metro Naga has the most up-to-date telecommunication facilities. BayanTel and PLDT, the two major telephone companies in the country, have over 138,000 subscribers in the metro area, while three major cellphone companies - Smart Communications, Globe Telecom and Dito Telecommunity - offer wireless communication and Short Message Service (SMS).

Broadband internet access is widely available through the DSL facilities of the landline telephone companies and the cable TV companies. These are complemented by at least eight Internet service providers (ISPs) and several internet cafes, which offer connections at affordable rates.

== Health services ==
Metro Naga has well-equipped medical facilities. Naga has four secondary hospitals, one regional medical center and one infirmary. Aside from these, a district hospital is located in the municipality of Ocampo with a 24-hour emergency service. Furthermore, Metro Naga has over 800 private dental and medical clinics and excellent laboratory facilities.

Health care is of a high standard with experienced and well-trained medical practitioners and hospital support services.

== Literacy ==
Computer literacy in Metro Naga begins at an early age when for the first time most children are exposed to a variety of computer-based technologies. Aside from the availability of PCs in most schools, desktop computers and leisure games such as PlayStations are popular in many households. Internet use by households is increasing because of high telephone-to-household density and the affordability of connection costs.

== Recreation and leisure ==
The biodiversity of the landscape is a popular lure for the domestic and international adventure tourism markets. Eco-tourism locations, diving, mountain climbing and trekking, complemented with some of the Philippines' most famous historical landmarks including the Shrine of the Virgin of Peñafrancia and other Spanish architecture of archaeological importance. A number of resorts exist in and around Naga and local guest houses are found in the municipal towns of the surrounding areas.

Day and evening entertainment facilities are numerous and the availability of local artists offers unlimited opportunities for establishing jazz lounges and coffee bars.

There are opportunities to establish tourism niche market packages offering a wide variety of activities including hiking, scuba diving, bungee jumping and even fruit-picking in a rural environment.

Local government unit	Development Role
Bombon	Primary food bowl; water resource development
Bula	Primary food bowl
Calabanga	Primary food bowl; fishing industry development, third urban center, investors
Camaligan	Auxiliary food supplier; gifts and home decors industry development, potential for high rise development due to proximity to Naga City
Canaman	Expansion area for middle-class housing, spillover of economic growth.
Gainza	Auxiliary food supplier; gifts and home decors industry development
Magarao	Primary food bowl
Milaor	Warehousing and bulk storage center, potential commercial center
Minalabac	Auxiliary food supplier, tourism
Naga	Business, education and cultural center; base of operations for firms that want to tap the potentials of the regional markets
Ocampo	Primary food bowl
Pamplona	Industrial estate development; cattle and dairy industry development
Pasacao	Gateway to major markets through the Pasacao Port; cattle and dairy industry development; fishing industry development
Pili	Secondary trading center; agro-industrial development
San Fernando	Cattle and dairy industry development; water resource development, housing development
