= Bicol River Hot Paddlers =

Bicol River Hot Paddlers is a dragon boat team composed of fisher folks and farmers who reside in a village along Bicol River in Canaman, Camarines Sur. It used to represent Camarines Sur Dragon Boat Team which won in international competitions until in 2009. The team competed as a new team at the Camarines Sur Dragon Boat Festival held in Pili, Camarines Sur in 2009.

Recently at the 1st Mercedes National Dragon Boat Competition held from 13 to 14 June 2014, the team won 2nd Place in 200m Open Small Boat (57:58), 4th place in 200m Mixed Small Boat (1:05:25) and 4th place in 200m Women's Small Boat category (2:18:49, cumulative time).
