= San Fernando, Camarines Sur =

Municipality in Camarines Sur, Philippines

San Fernando
- Municipality
- Municipality of San Fernando
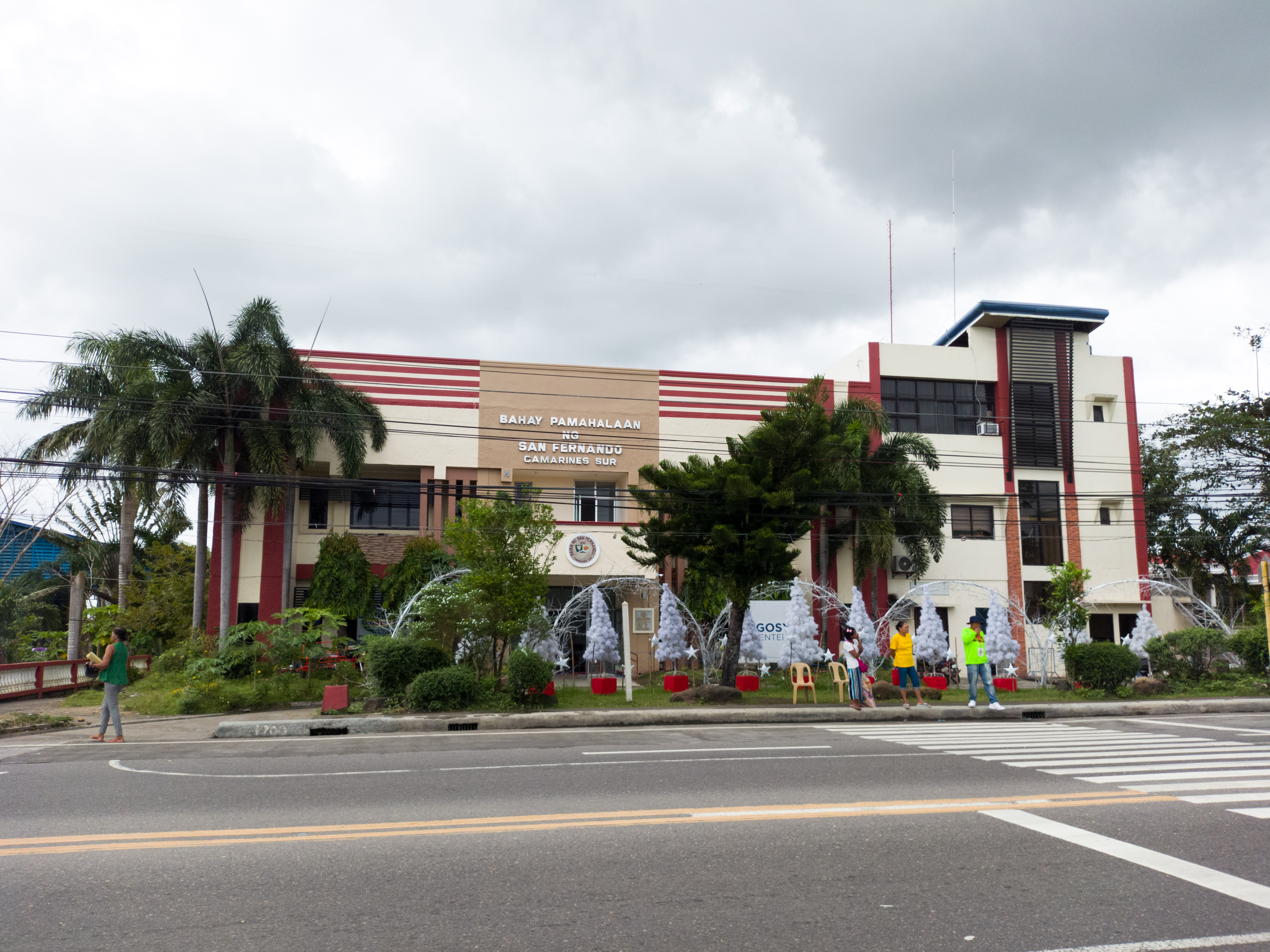
- Municipal Hall

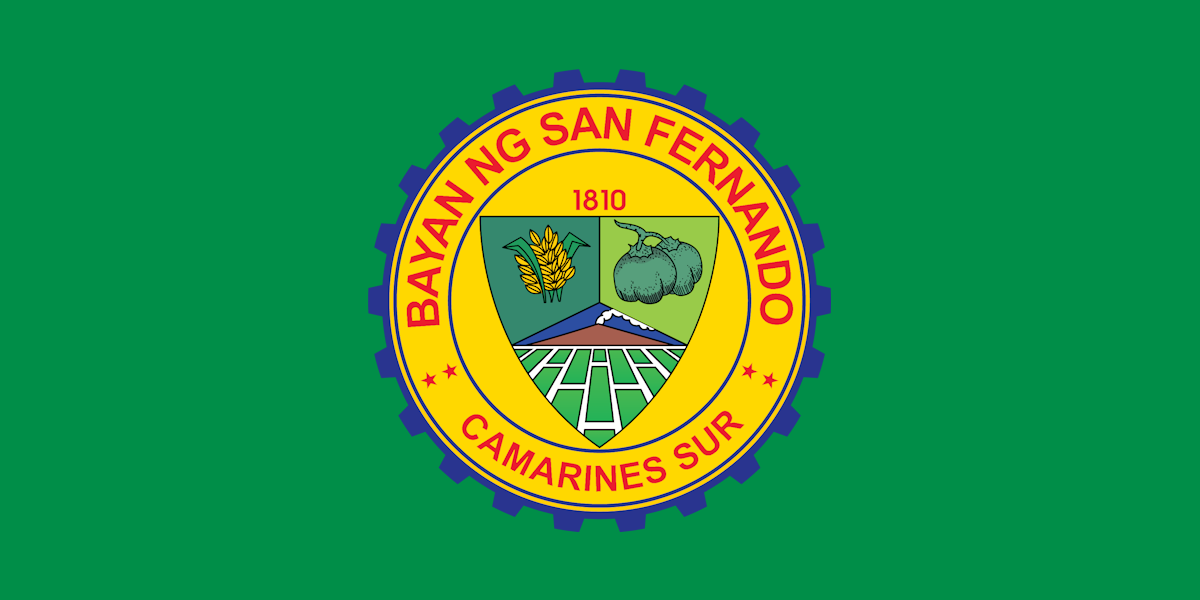
- Flag Seal

- Map of Camarines Sur with San Fernando highlighted
- Interactive map of San Fernando
- Location within the Philippines
- Coordinates: 13°33′52″N 123°08′40″E
- Country: Philippines
- Region: Bicol Region
- Province: Camarines Sur
- District: 2nd district
- Founded: October 2, 1810
- Barangays: 22 (see Barangays)

Government
  - Type: Sangguniang Bayan
  - Mayor: Betty Ann Kristine Danabar-Fulgentes
  - Vice Mayor: Maria Maganda E. Lañada
  - Representative: Luigi Villafuerte
  - Municipal Council: Members: Malou Belga; Rhishelle Jabonette; Allan Valenzuela; Tobal Notado; Lilia Mayores; Aris Ragay; Sapog Andres; Moloy Villablanca; Nono Mabulo
  - Electorate: 25,193 voters (2025)

Area
  - Total: 71.76 km^{2} (27.71 sq mi)
- Elevation: 19 m (62 ft)
- Highest elevation: 181 m (594 ft)
- Lowest elevation: −3 m (−9.8 ft)

Population (2024 census)
  - Total: 39,206
  - Density: 546.3/km^{2} (1,415/sq mi)
  - Households: 8,313

Economy
  - Income class: 2nd municipal income class
  - Poverty incidence: 27.61% (2023)
  - Revenue: ₱ 173.7 million (2024)
  - Assets: ₱ 799.8 million (2024)
  - Expenditure: ₱ 144.6 million (2024)
  - Liabilities: ₱ 143.6 million (2024)

Service provider
  - Electricity: Camarines Sur 1 Electric Cooperative (CASURECO 1)
- Time zone: UTC+8 (PST)
- ZIP code: 4415
- PSGC: 0501732000
- IDD : area code: +63 (0)54
- Native languages: Central Bikol; Tagalog

San Fernando, officially the Municipality of San Fernando (Central Bikol: Banwaan kan San Fernando; Tagalog: Bayan ng San Fernando), is a municipality in the province of Camarines Sur, Philippines. According to the 2024 census, it has a population of 39,206 people.

== History ==
The province of Ambos Camarines once listed San Fernando as one of its visitas or barrios. The town stayed a barrio of Milaor for over 230 years.

Pueblo de San Fernando became an independent town on January 1, 1813, after separating from Milaor. The 1818 Spanish census recorded the area as having 688 native families and 2 Spanish-Filipino families.

The residents of this old settlement were noted for their religious devotion as manifested by their honor and dedication to San Fernando, the town's patron saint. This patron of San Fernando, according to historical records, was however not the original patron saint for whom the first settlers built the chapel. They actually built a chapel in honor of their patron saint San Fernando. However, for some unusual reasons, the image was lost after it had been transferred into the newly erected chapel. It was said that efforts were wielded to find the missing icon but it all ended into great frustration as the lost image of San Fernando was not found. One resident from the old site where the image was housed later informed the people of San Fernando that the image returned to its original location. With this incident, the Teniente del Barrio then decided to install the image of another saint, Saint John the Baptist. Their celebration of the town and parish fiesta is held every 24 June.

== Geography ==
San Fernando is 22 kilometres (14 mi) from the provincial capital town Pili and 428 kilometres (266 mi) from the country's capital city of Manila.

=== Barangays ===
San Fernando is administratively subdivided into 22 barangays. Each barangay consists of puroks and some have sitios.

- Alianza
- Beberon
- Bical
- Bocal
- Bonifacio (Poblacion)
- Buenavista (Poblacion)
- Calascagas
- Cotmo
- Daculang Tubig
- Del Pilar (Poblacion)
- Gñaran
- Grijalvo
- Lupi
- Maragñi
- Pamukid
- Pinamasagan
- Pipian
- Planza
- Rizal (Poblacion)
- San Joaquin
- Santa Cruz
- Tagpocol

=== Climate ===
Climate data for San Fernando, Camarines Sur
Month	Jan	Feb	Mar	Apr	May	Jun	Jul	Aug	Sep	Oct	Nov	Dec	Year
Mean daily maximum °C (°F)	33 (91)	32 (90)	35 (95)	37 (99)	38 (100)	36 (97)	35 (95)	33 (91)	35 (95)	34 (93)	33 (91)	32 (90)	34 (94)
Mean daily minimum °C (°F)	27 (81)	27 (81)	29 (84)	31 (88)	32 (90)	32 (90)	31 (88)	29 (84)	30 (86)	29 (84)	28 (82)	28 (82)	29 (85)
Average precipitation mm (inches)	36.66 (1.44)	58.6 (2.31)	37.91 (1.49)	76.31 (3.00)	98.34 (3.87)	151.99 (5.98)	288.39 (11.35)	291.41 (11.47)	186.77 (7.35)	363.21 (14.30)	97.5 (3.84)	292.1 (11.50)	1,979.19 (77.9)
Average rainy days	18	23	16	17	25	28	31	26	27	29	24	29	293
Source: World Weather Online

== Demographics ==
Population census of San Fernando
Year	Pop.	±% p.a.
1903	3,542	—
1918	3,174	−0.73%
1939	7,064	+3.88%
1948	8,608	+2.22%
1960	14,435	+4.40%
1970	13,393	−0.75%
1975	15,524	+3.01%
1980	17,176	+2.04%
1990	20,608	+1.84%
1995	24,196	+3.05%
2000	27,433	+2.73%
2007	30,697	+1.56%
2010	33,281	+2.98%
2015	35,258	+1.11%
2020	38,626	+1.94%
2024	39,206	+0.36%
Source: Philippine Statistics Authority

In the 2024 census, the population of San Fernando was 39,206 people, with a density of 550 inhabitants per square kilometre or 1,400 inhabitants per square mile. From 1975 to 2020, San Fernando grew an average of 2.24%, which means the municipality is showing a strong population growth. This population of 38,000 is expected to double within 20 years jumping from 38,000 to over 77,000 people in 2040.

=== Religion ===
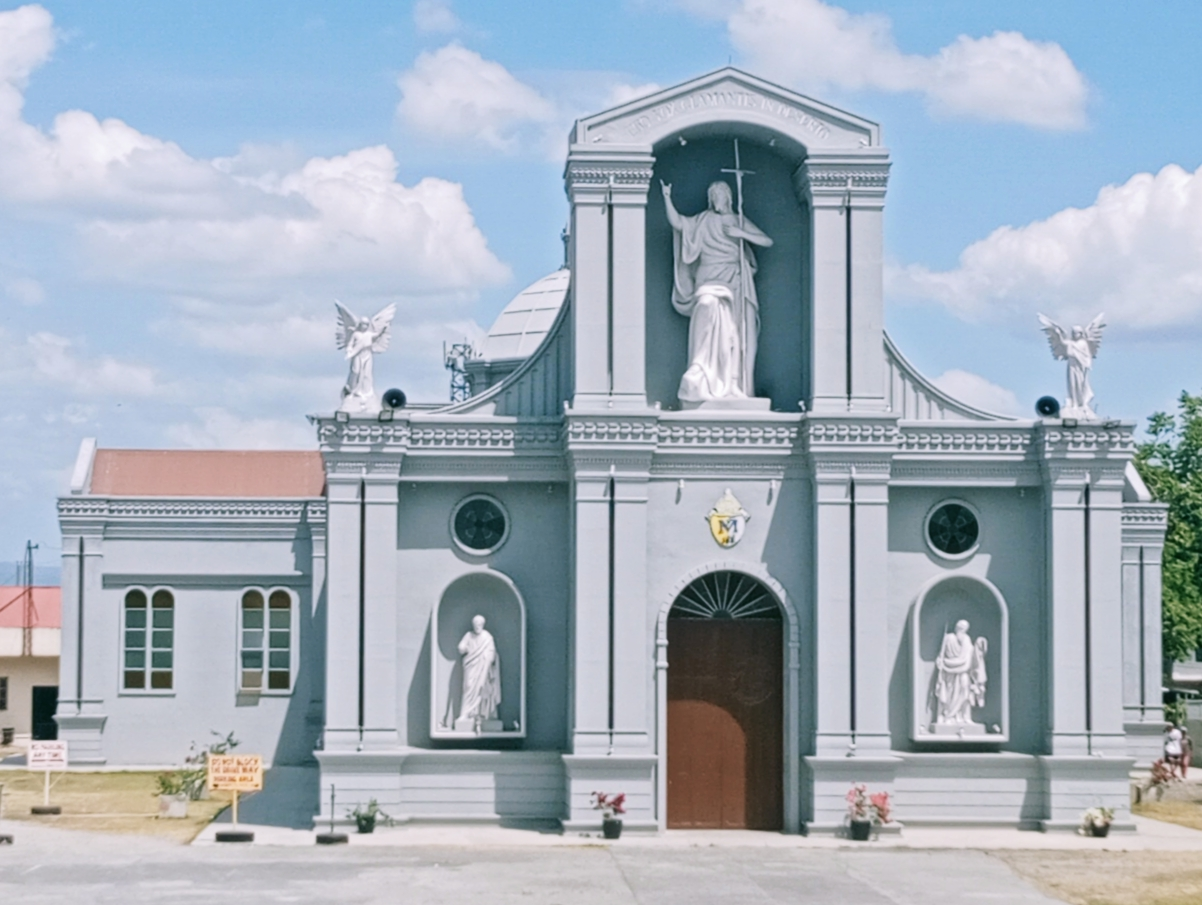
St. John the Baptist Parish Church

The present parish priest is Rev. Fr. Michael Dela Rosa V.G. At present the parish is taking care of 22 barangays of the municipality with the vision of forming SKK, saradit na kristiyanong komunidad (basic ecclesial communities). There are 235 clusters of families. Each cluster is composed of 15-20 neighboring families. Each cluster has a shepherd, called a cluster leader. A leader serves as the co-ordinator for all pastoral and community activities.

== Economy ==
Poverty incidence of San Fernando (%)

Source: Philippine Statistics Authority

Local industries include hat making and bag making. The main agricultural product is rice. Backyard poultry and piggery are also practiced. Fishery and aquatic resources include hito, dalag, martinico, carp, tilapia, eels and mirapina which thrive in fresh water.

San Fernando was formerly included in the Metro Naga area before the designation was discontinued in 2017.

=== Economic growth ===
Being a town with access to water, has wide agriculture land, and is strategically located along the national highway, the town rapidly become an area of development.

The government also made road improvements all over the rural and urban areas. Areas such as Planza, Pamukid, and Grijalvo have become major hubs that all combined has 21% of the GDP of the entire municipality.

== Education ==
The San Fernando Schools District Office governs all educational institutions within the municipality. It oversees the management and operations of all private and public, from primary to secondary schools.

=== Elementary schools ===
- Alianza Elementary School
- Beberon Elementary School
- Bical Elementary School
- Bocal Elementary School
- Calascagas Elementary School
- Calascagas Primary School
- Cotmo Elementary School
- Daculang Tubig Elementary School
- Ferran Learning Center
- Gnaran Elementary School
- Grijalvo Elementary School
- Lupi Elementary School
- Marangi Elementary School
- Mary Nymph Montessori School
- Pamukid Elementary School
- Pinamasagan Elementary School
- Pipian Elementary School
- Planza Elementary School
- San Fernando Central School
- San Joaquin Elementary School
- Shalom Bicol Faith Academy
- Sta. Cruz Elementary School
- Sunrise Institute of Learning
- Tagpocol Elementary School

=== Secondary schools ===
- Bical Elementary School
- Lupi National High School
- Marangi High School
- Pinamasagan National High School
- Pamukid National High School
- San Fernando National High School (1966)

== Healthcare ==
- DOH Camarines Sur
- San Fernando hospital
- Pamukid barangay center
