= Magarao =

Municipality in Camarines Sur, Philippines

- Municipality
- Municipality of Magarao
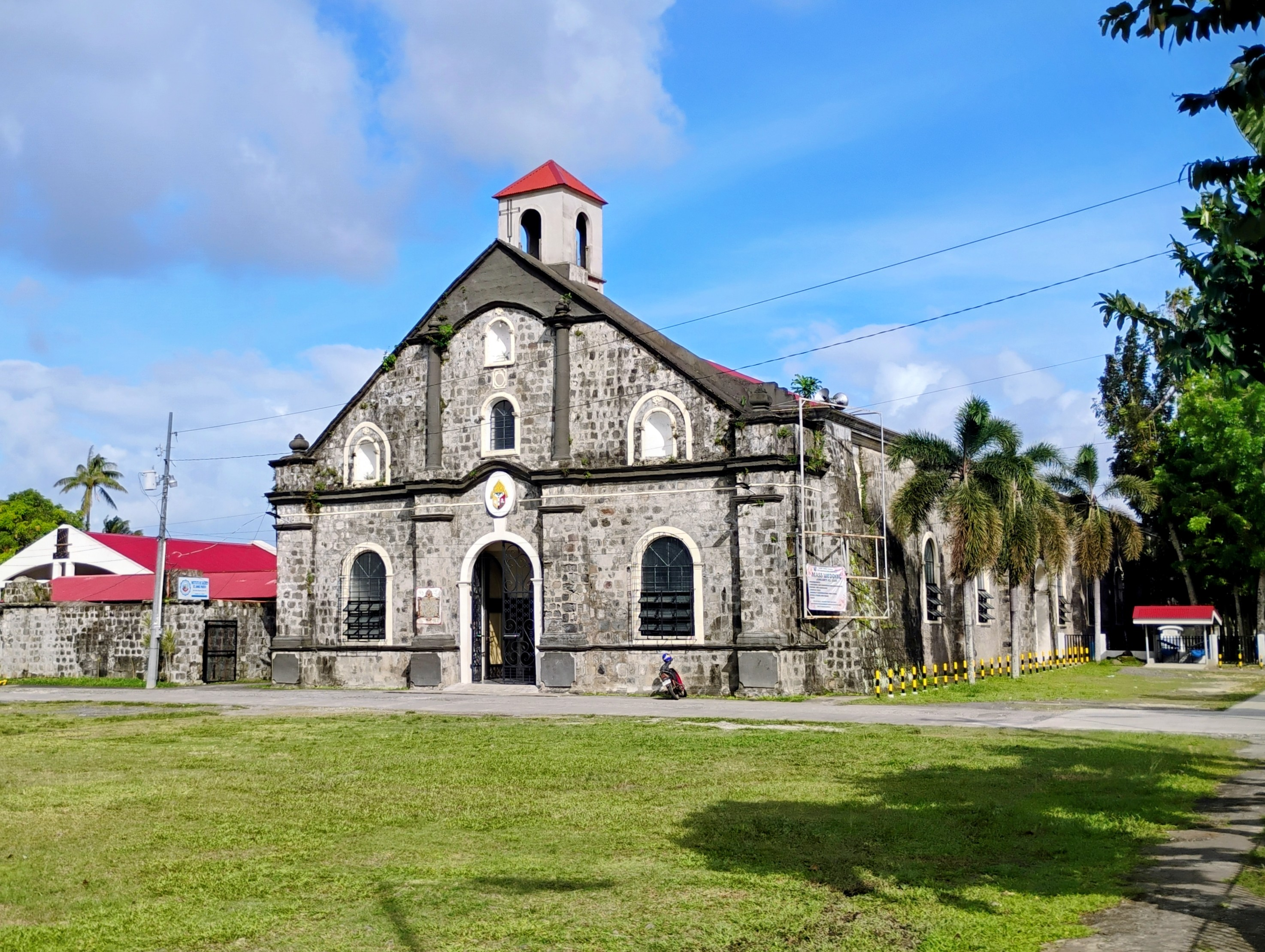
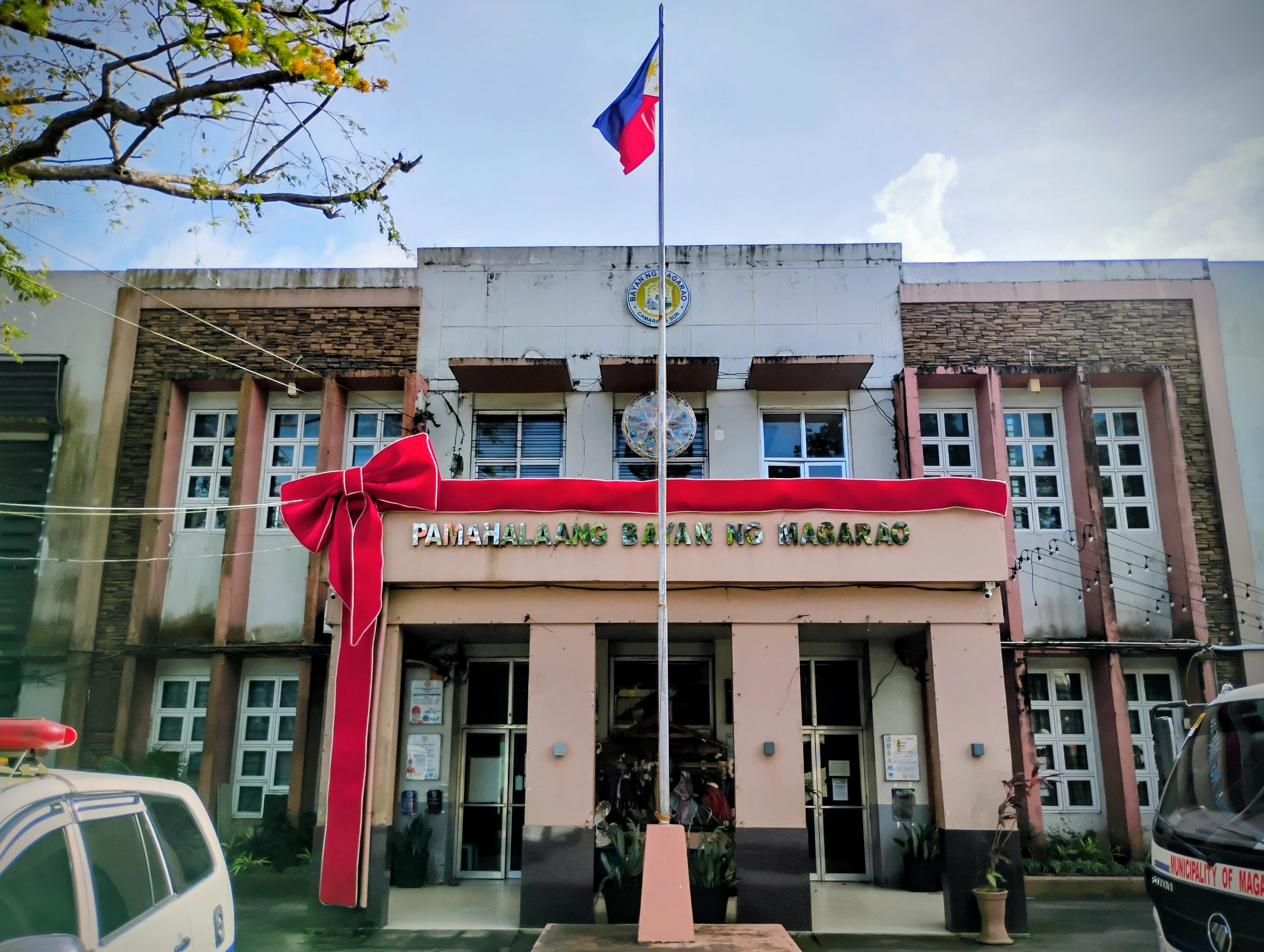
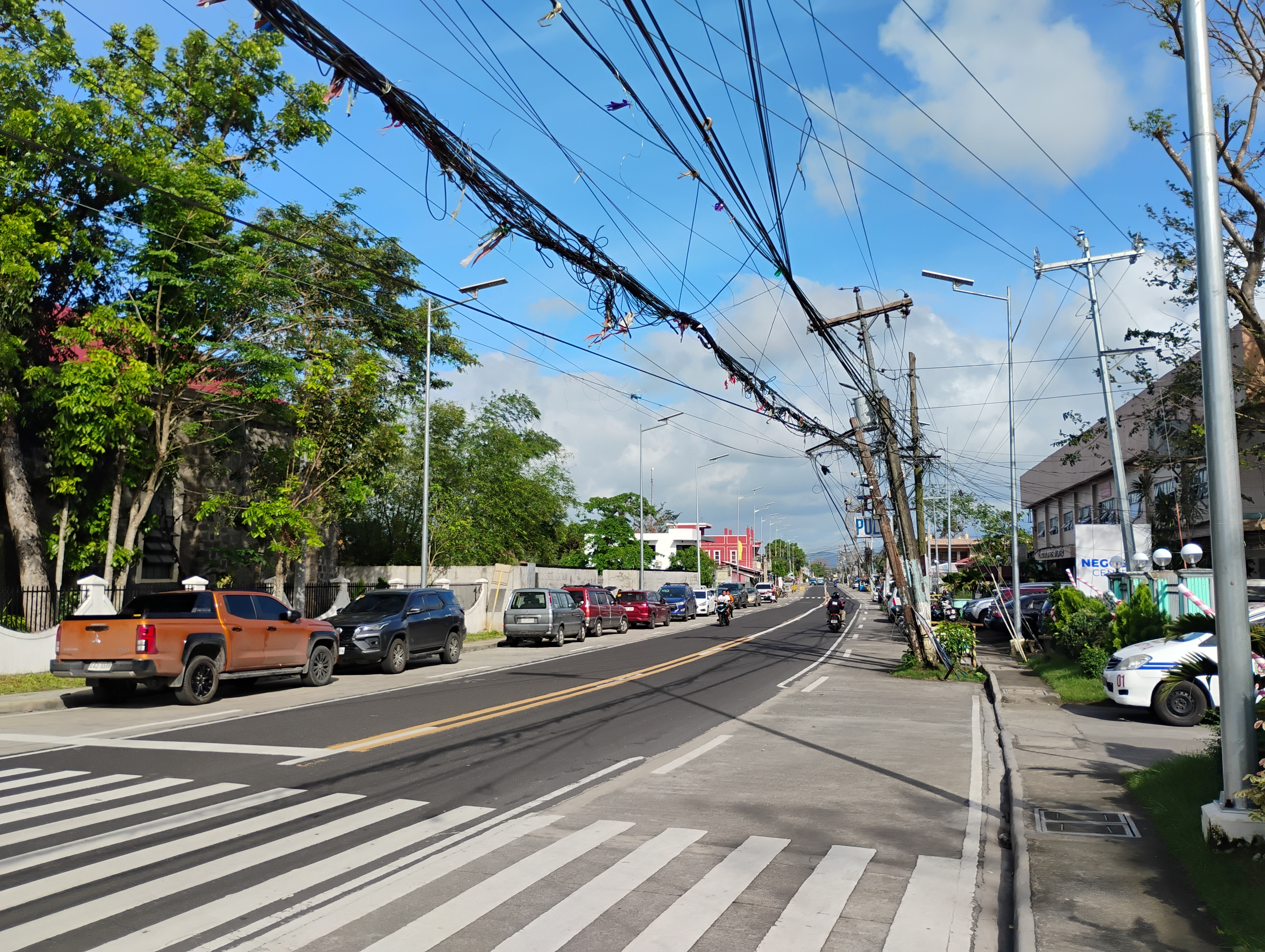
- Saint Anne Parish Church Magarao Municipal Hall Magarao Town Proper

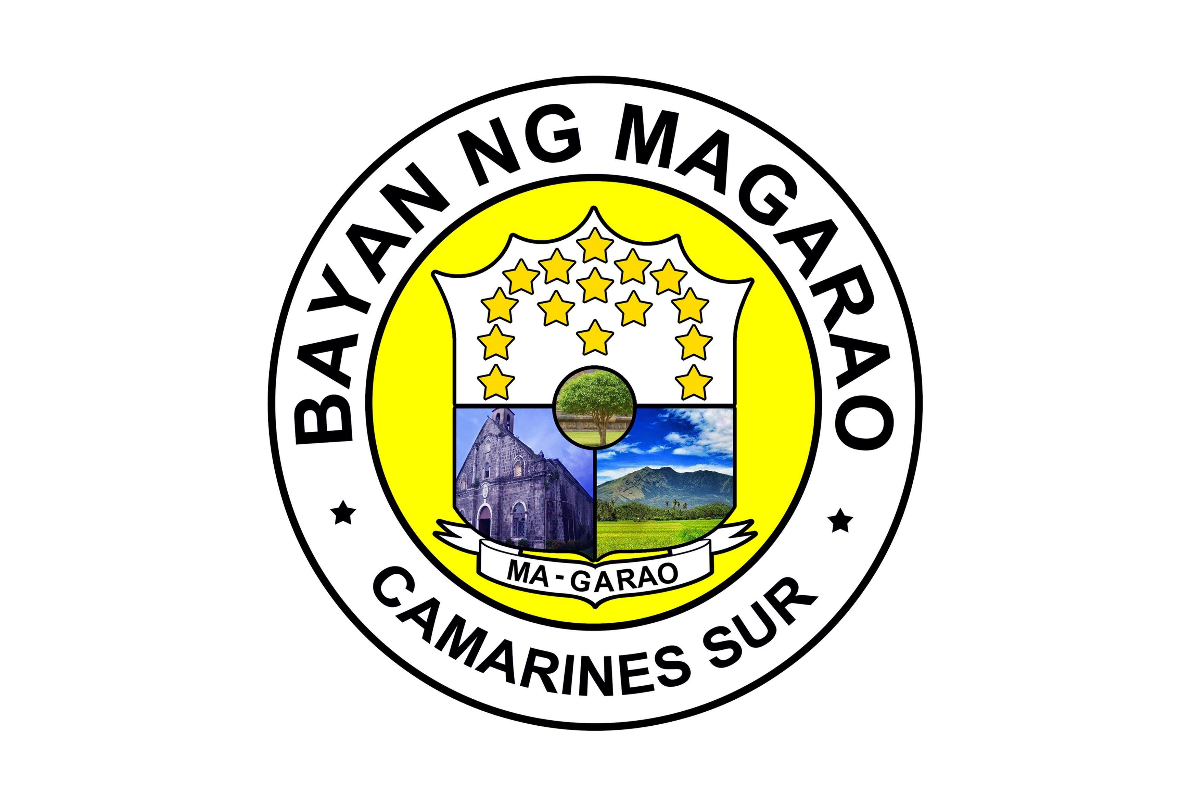
- Flag

- Map of Camarines Sur with Magarao highlighted
- Interactive map of Magarao
- Location within the Philippines
- Coordinates: 13°39′43″N 123°11′25″E
- Country: Philippines
- Region: Bicol Region
- Province: Camarines Sur
- District: 3rd district
- Founded: 1570
- Barangays: 15 (see Barangays)

Government
  - Type: Sangguniang Bayan
  - Mayor: Ma. Maruja A. Señar
  - Vice Mayor: Edmund Aldrin C. Bediones
  - Representative: Nelson S. Legacion
  - Municipal Council: Members: Santy R. Estefani; Raymund Hermie T. Odiada; Teresita R. Blasa; Maria Janet E. Aspe; Nenita A. Aspe; Benigno Salvador A. Señar; Lorelie A. Brabante; Alvin A. Parma
  - Electorate: 19,499 voters (2025)

Area
  - Total: 44.97 km^{2} (17.36 sq mi)
- Elevation: 9.0 m (29.5 ft)
- Highest elevation: 46 m (151 ft)
- Lowest elevation: −2 m (−6.6 ft)

Population (2024 census)
  - Total: 28,197
  - Density: 627.0/km^{2} (1,624/sq mi)
  - Households: 5,884

Economy
  - Income class: 4th municipal income class
  - Poverty incidence: 19.3% (2023)
  - Revenue: ₱ 129.5 million (2024)
  - Assets: ₱ 291.6 million (2024)
  - Expenditure: ₱ 126.3 million (2024)
  - Liabilities: ₱ 54.55 million (2024)

Service provider
  - Electricity: Camarines Sur 2 Electric Cooperative (CASURECO 2)
- Time zone: UTC+8 (PST)
- ZIP code: 4403
- PSGC: 0501720000
- IDD : area code: +63 (0)54
- Native languages: Central Bikol; Tagalog

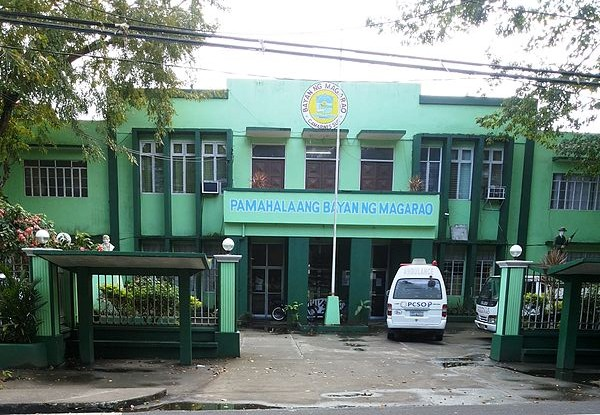

Magarao, officially the Municipality of Magarao (Central Bikol: Banwaan kan Magarao; Tagalog: Bayan ng Magarao), is a municipality in the province of Camarines Sur, Philippines. According to the 2024 census, it has a population of 28,197 people.

It is known for its traditional healers (Chiropractor or massage therapist) locally called manghihilot. Residents and visitors seek them for muscle pain, strained tendons, and body fatigue. The practice of hilot has been passed down through generations, making the town recognized as the Hilot Capital of Bicol for this local healing tradition.

== Etymology ==
Magarao derived its name from the abundance of fishtraps called "garao" which was used by the locals along its creeks and rivers. The prefix ma- denotes abundance. Thus, Ma-garao meaning a place with many garao.

== History ==
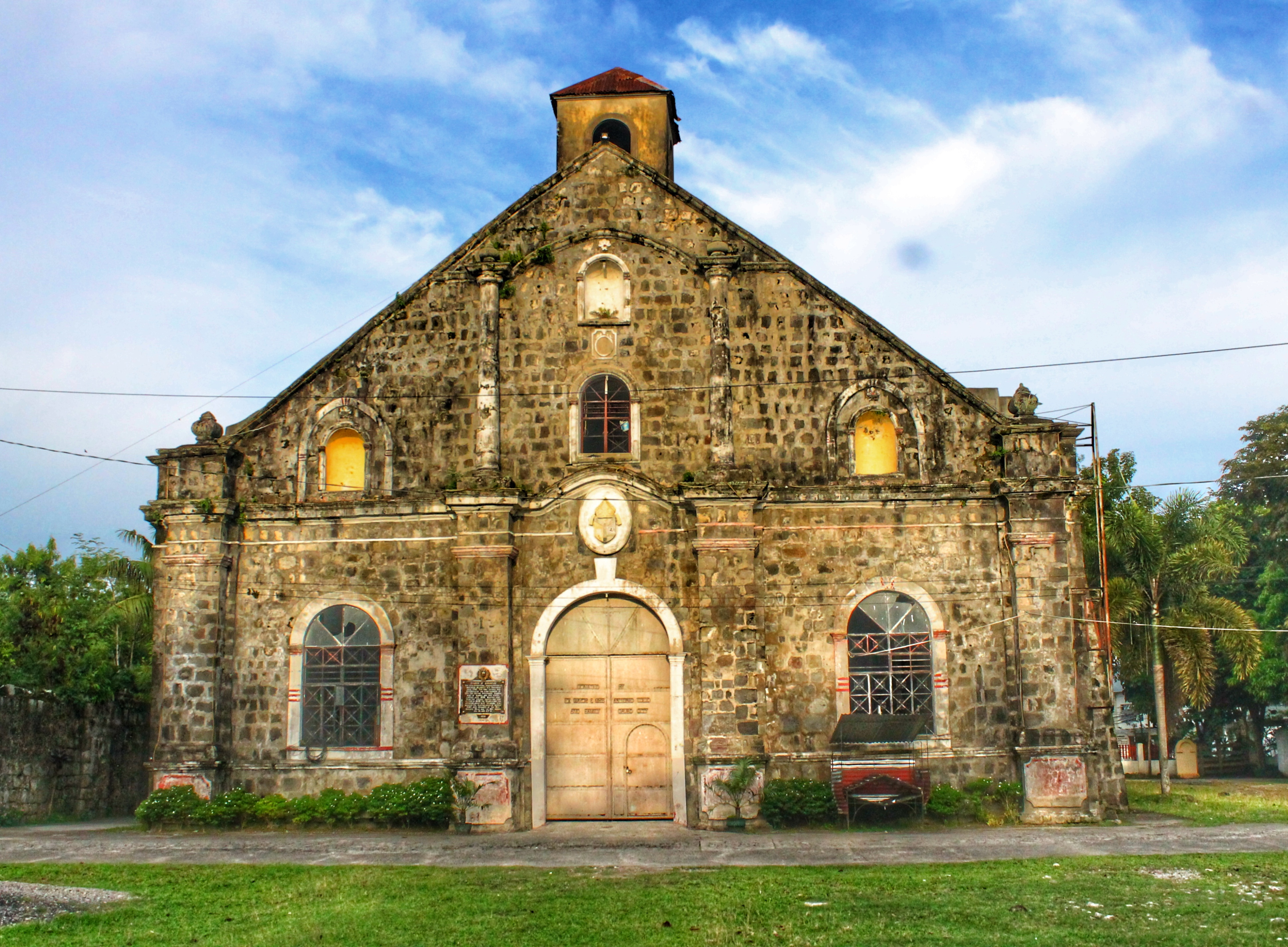
Magarao Church

It was a group of missionaries from the Order of Friars Minor who founded the town in 1570, although missionary work continued only in the year 1690.

== Geography ==
=== Barangays ===
Magarao is politically subdivided into 15 barangays. Each barangay consists of puroks and some have sitios.

- Barobaybay
- Bell (Poblacion)
- Carangcang
- Carigsa
- Casuray
- Monserrat (Poblacion)
- Ponong
- San Francisco (Poblacion)
- San Isidro (Poblacion)
- San Juan (Poblacion)
- San Miguel
- San Pantaleon (Poblacion)
- Santa Lucia (Poblacion)
- Santa Rosa
- Santo Tomas (Poblacion)

=== Climate ===
Climate data for Magarao, Camarines Sur
Month	Jan	Feb	Mar	Apr	May	Jun	Jul	Aug	Sep	Oct	Nov	Dec	Year
Mean daily maximum °C (°F)	32 (90)	31 (88)	34 (93)	36 (97)	37 (99)	37 (99)	36 (97)	34 (93)	35 (95)	34 (93)	33 (91)	32 (90)	34 (94)
Mean daily minimum °C (°F)	27 (81)	27 (81)	29 (84)	31 (88)	32 (90)	32 (90)	31 (88)	30 (86)	30 (86)	29 (84)	28 (82)	28 (82)	30 (85)
Average precipitation mm (inches)	39.34 (1.55)	68.7 (2.70)	26.73 (1.05)	66.19 (2.61)	84.49 (3.33)	178.89 (7.04)	244.27 (9.62)	188.3 (7.41)	160.98 (6.34)	445 (17.5)	135.5 (5.33)	367.8 (14.48)	2,006.19 (78.96)
Average rainy days	16	18	13	15	23	28	30	24	26	27	25	29	274
Source: World Weather Online (modeled/calculated data, not measured locally)

== Demographics ==
Population census of Magarao

Year	Pop.	±% p.a.
1903	4,374	—
1918	5,717	+1.80%
1939	8,556	+1.94%
1948	10,411	+2.20%
1960	8,501	−1.67%
1970	10,938	+2.55%
1975	11,846	+1.61%
1980	13,414	+2.52%

Year	Pop.	±% p.a.
1990	16,623	+2.17%
1995	18,264	+1.78%
2000	20,964	+3.00%
2007	22,515	+0.99%
2010	24,274	+2.78%
2015	25,694	+1.09%
2020	26,742	+0.84%
2024	28,197	+1.28%

Source: Philippine Statistics Authority

In the 2024 census, the population of Magarao was 28,197 people, with a density of 630 inhabitants per square kilometre or 1,600 inhabitants per square mile.

=== Languages ===
Bicol is widely spoken in the town, while Tagalog, Hiligaynon, Bisaya, and Ilocano are used immigrants. Tagalog is being used by locals as lingua franca when communicating with non-Bicolanos.

=== Religion ===
Residents of Magarao are predominantly Roman Catholic.

Barangay Santa Lucia holds an annual novena to its patron saint, Lucy of Syracuse, nine days before her feast on 13 December. Villagers bring the saint's image in procession every morning of the novena at the poblacion, a celebration that attracts devotees from other parts of the Bicol Region. Hymns to the saint, known as the Gozos, as well as the Spanish version of the Ave Maria, are chanted during the dawn procession, which is followed by a Mass.

== Economy ==
Poverty incidence of Magarao (%)

Source: Philippine Statistics Authority

At present, Magarao belongs to the municipality bracket, although there are improvements being made by the local government to hasten its developmental stage. The town, through the initiative of its local officials, allows its constituents to engage into worthwhile activities by providing for them training and seminar workshops on various livelihood projects like ceramics training, papermaking, handicrafts and other community-based industries.

This was made possible due to the combined efforts made by the local government of Magarao and the provincial government of Camarines Sur through the Provincial Livelihood Training, Research and Development Program (PLTRD). The program is geared towards providing community-based industries, identifying projects for product development and skills training and also conducting seminar and workshops for the various livelihood projects.

The residents of Magarao has immersed themselves in opportunities which would not just serve benefits for them but would obviously boost their town's economic condition.

Magarao was formerly included in the Metro Naga area before the designation was discontinued in 2017.

== Infrastructure ==
=== Communications ===
Internet providers include Globe, Smart, TNT, PLDT in the town. Telephone company is BayanTel and other local telephone companies.

=== Power ===
Power and electricity is supplied by the Camarines Sur Electric Cooperative II (CASURECO II).

=== Roads ===
Most roads are paved. The main road is both paved and asphalted. Rural areas are mostly gravel or dirt roads Calabanga-Naga road or Northbound road goes through town.

=== Transportation ===
Coastal barangays are served by bancas that ply from the wharf near Naga City to the barangays of Ponong, Barobaybay and Carigsa along the Bicol River and in the estuarine areas.

=== Water utility ===
Water is provided by Metro Naga Water District (MNWD).

== Education ==
The Magarao-Bombon Schools District Office governs all educational institutions within the municipality. It oversees the management and operations of all private and public, from primary to secondary schools.

=== Primary and elementary schools ===
- Barobaybay Elementary School
- Bell-San Francisco Elementary School
- Carangcang Elementary School
- Casa Amihan Playschool
- Casuray Elementary School
- Doroteo Federis Sr. National High School
- Francisville Learning Center
- Instituto De Caceres
- Magarao Central School
- Prince Thad Montessori School
- Sta. Lucia Elementary School

=== Secondary schools ===
- Magarao National High School
- Ponong Integrated School

== Gallery ==
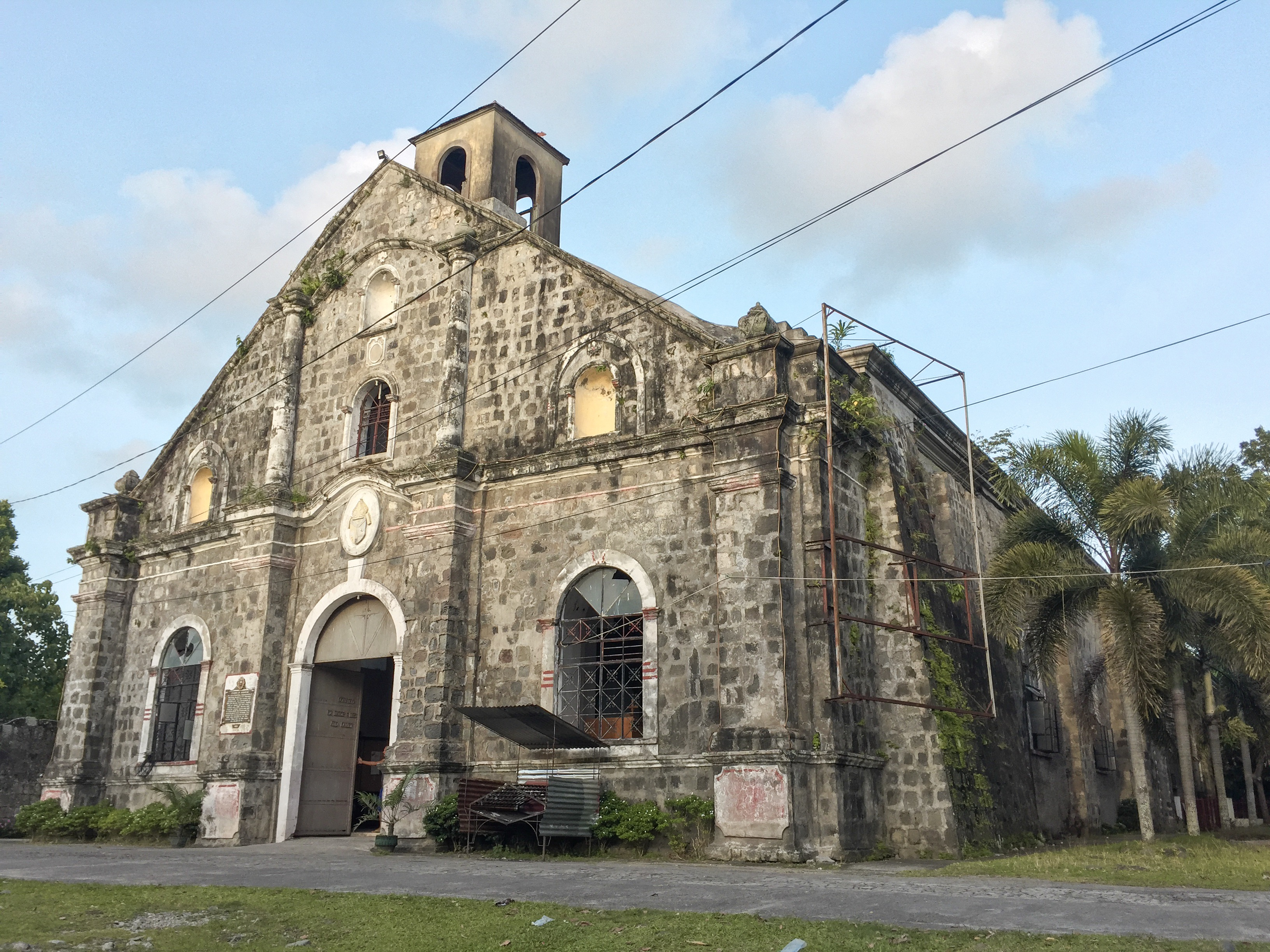
Saint Anne Parish Church

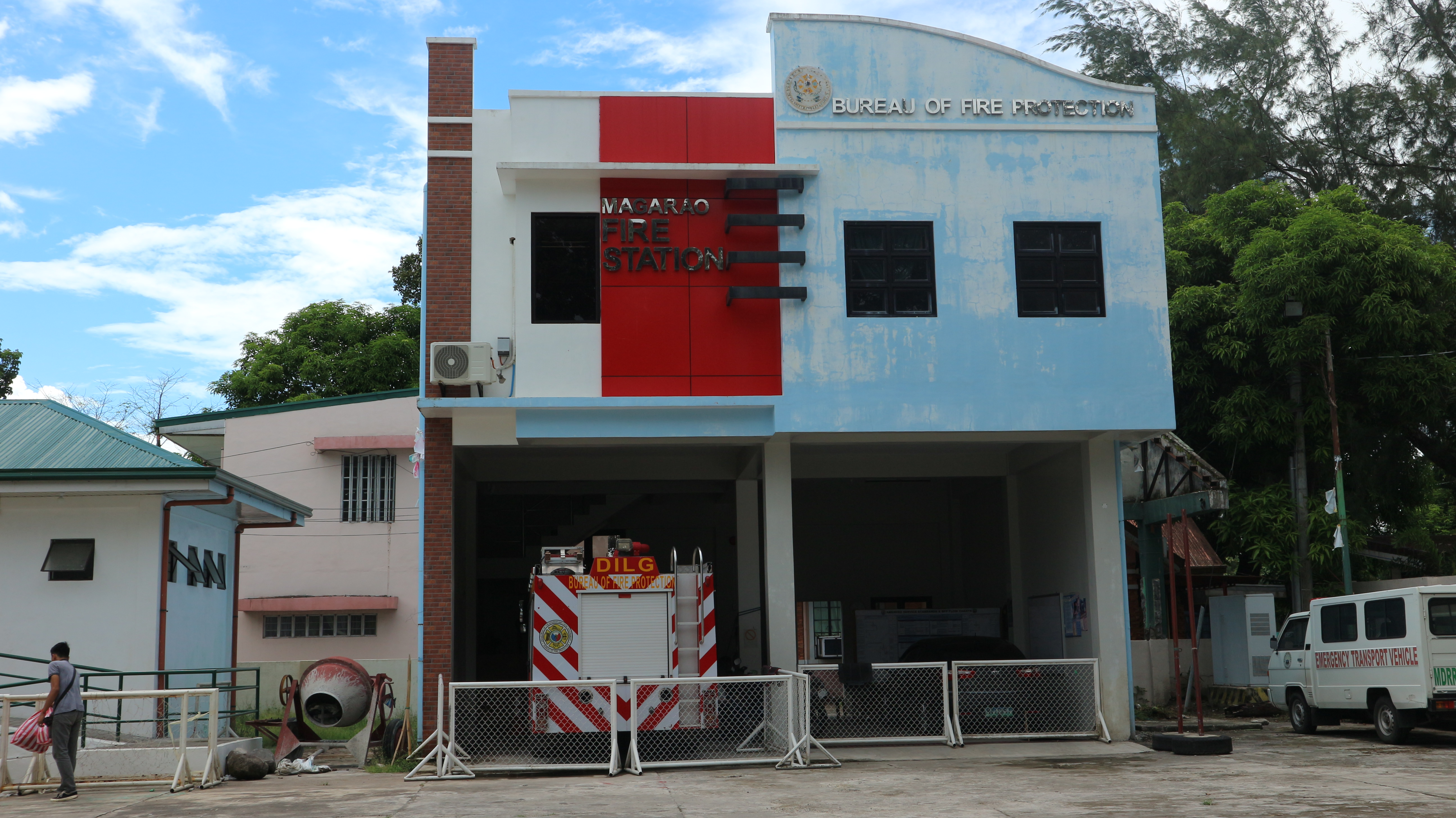
Magarao Fire Station

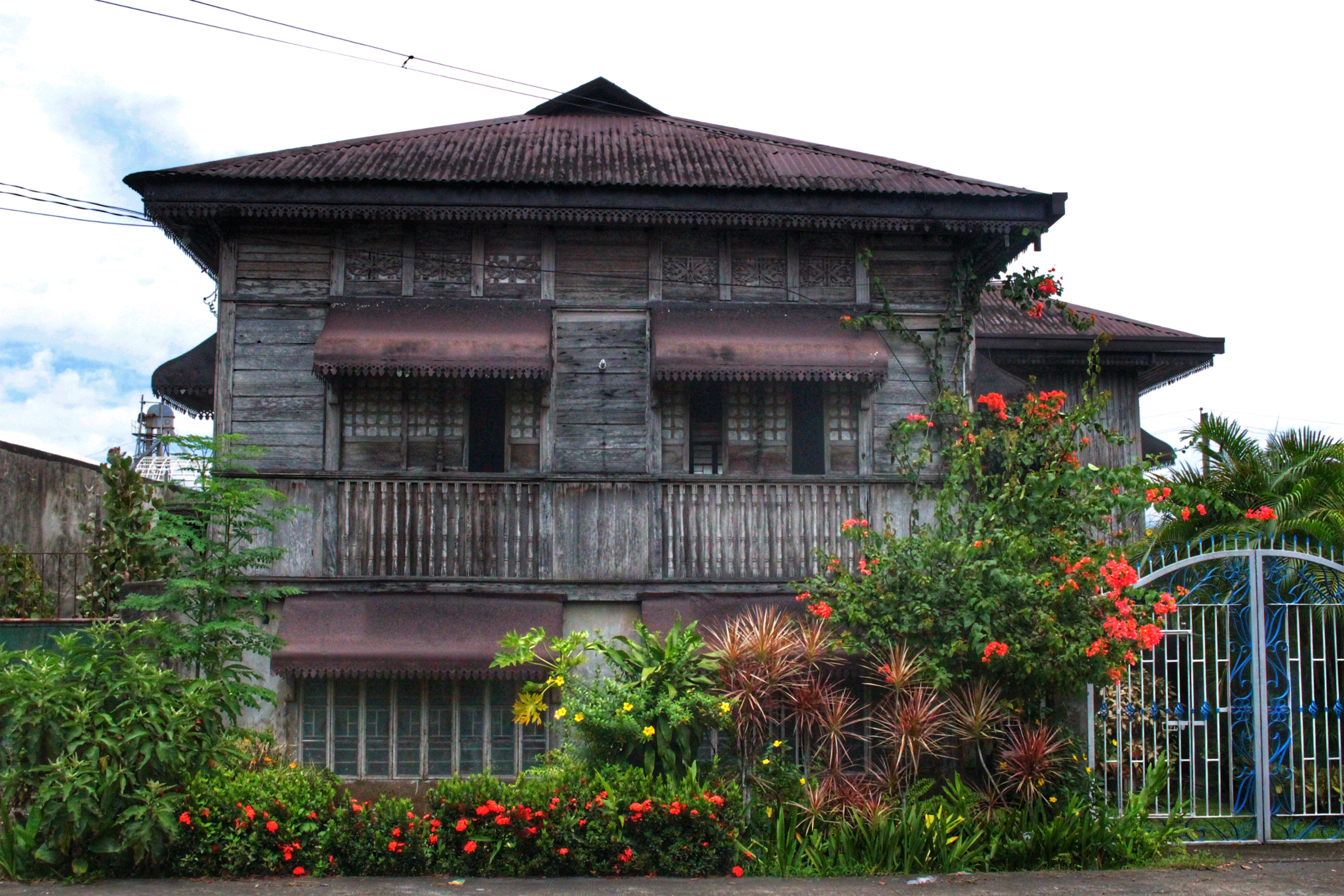
A heritage house in Magarao

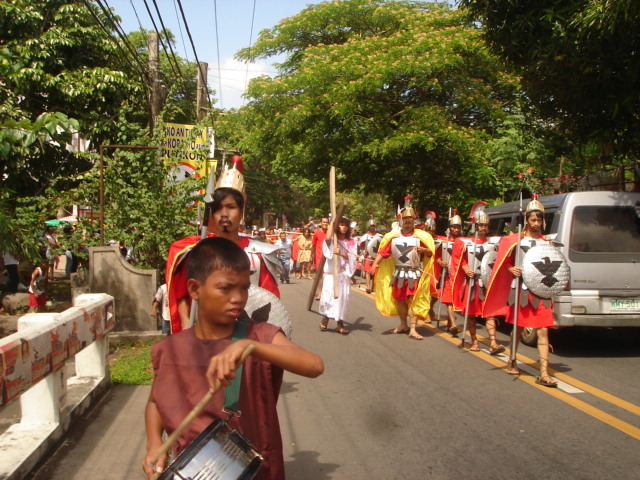
Senakulo during Holy Week
