= Alberto Naperi =

President of Central Bicol State University of Agriculture

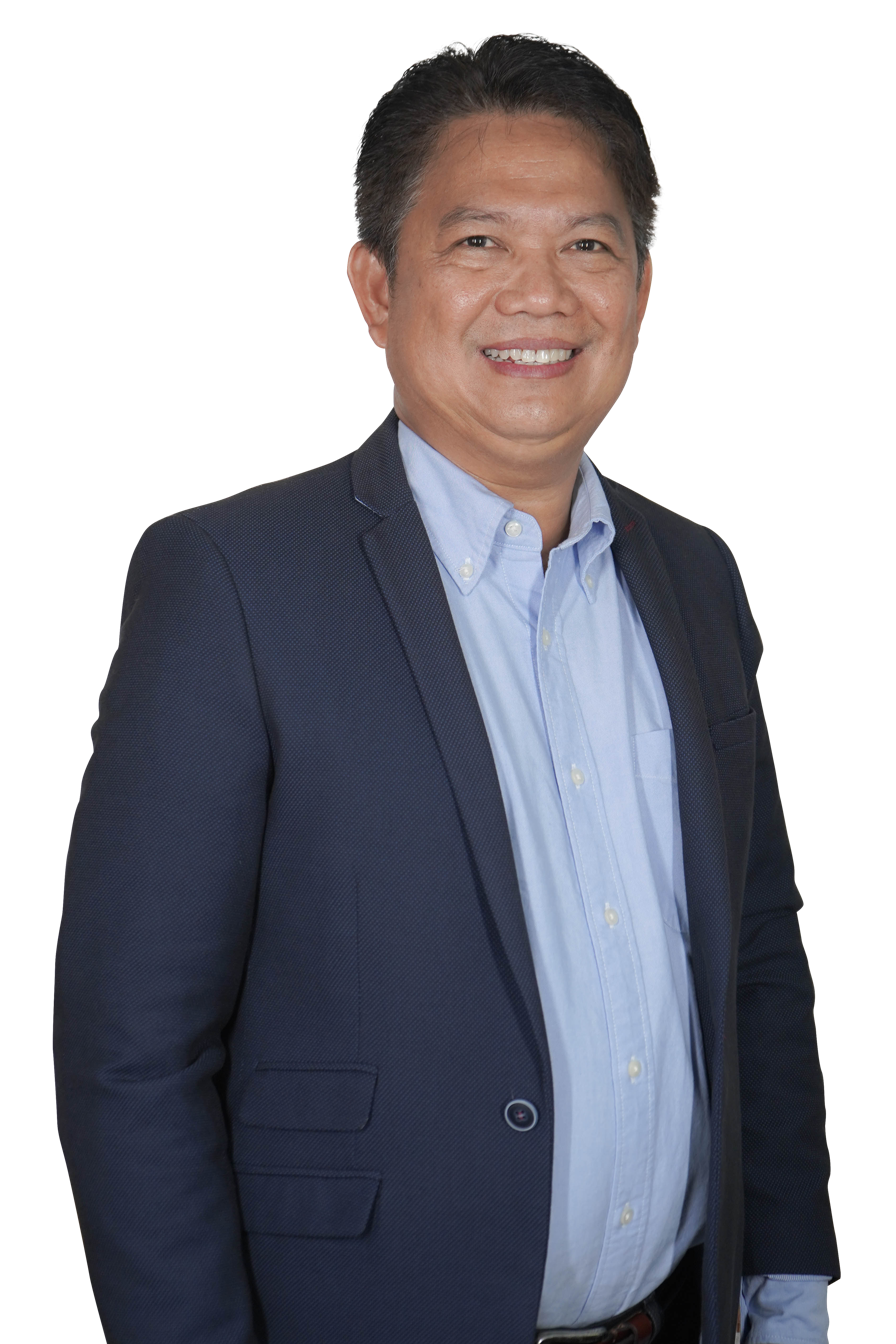

Personal details
- Education: Bicol University
- Occupation: Educator

Dr. Alberto N. Naperi is a Filipino educator and the current president of Central Bicol State University of Agriculture (CBSUA), one of the oldest universities in the Philippines. He currently serves as council chairperson of the Private Agriculture and Fishery Extension Service Provider (PAF-ESP).

He is the current vice president (2024–2025) of the Philippine Association of Extension Program Implementers, Inc. (PAEPI), a professional association whose membership comprises individuals and institutions collaborating with global reputable partners who share similar thrusts and objectives in career development. He also served as chair of the Regional Research and Development Coordinating Council (RRDCC) of the Bicol Consortium for Agriculture, Aquatic, and Natural Resources Research and Development (BCAARRD).

Before his current post as a state university president, he served as vice-president for administration at Sorsogon State University.

During his early tenure, Central Bicol State University of Agriculture hosted the Taboan National Writers’ Festival of the National Commission for Culture and the Arts which the Camarines Sur provincial governor Luis Miguel Villafuerte, Camarines Sur 4th district representative Gabriel Bordado, and other officials supported. In 2021, Naperi was criticized by Bordado for being neutral on the bill seeking to rename the school to Governor Luis R. Villafuerte University of Agriculture” (GLRVUA) during the hearing of the House of Representatives Committee on Higher and Technical Education. He eventually issued an official statement against the proposed bill by Camarines Sur 2nd district representative Luis Raymund Villafuerte.

Under his presidency, the state university has entered partnerships and agreements for quality education, community development, organic agriculture, environment, disaster risk reduction, zero-waste management, among others. Under his term, CBSUA, the Vietnam National University of Agriculture (VNUA), Ecosystem Research and Development Department (ERDB), and Ministry of Natural Resources and Environment, co-hosted the 2nd International Conference on Education, Environment and Agriculture (ICEEA 2021) connecting with individuals, organizations, universities and partners to address the pressing needs for food and livelihoods on the global context of unprecedented challenges.

In 2024, Naperi was honored as an alumni by the Bicol University for his accomplishments that brought prestige to the university in the field of education, leadership, character and service as an educator.

Academic offices
Preceded by Georgina J. Bordado	President of the Central Bicol State University of Agriculture; 2018–present	Succeeded by Ramona Isabel Ramirez
