= Central Bicol State University of Agriculture =

Public university in Camarines Sur, Philippines

- Pamantasang Pampamahalaan sa Agrikultura ng Gitnang Bikol
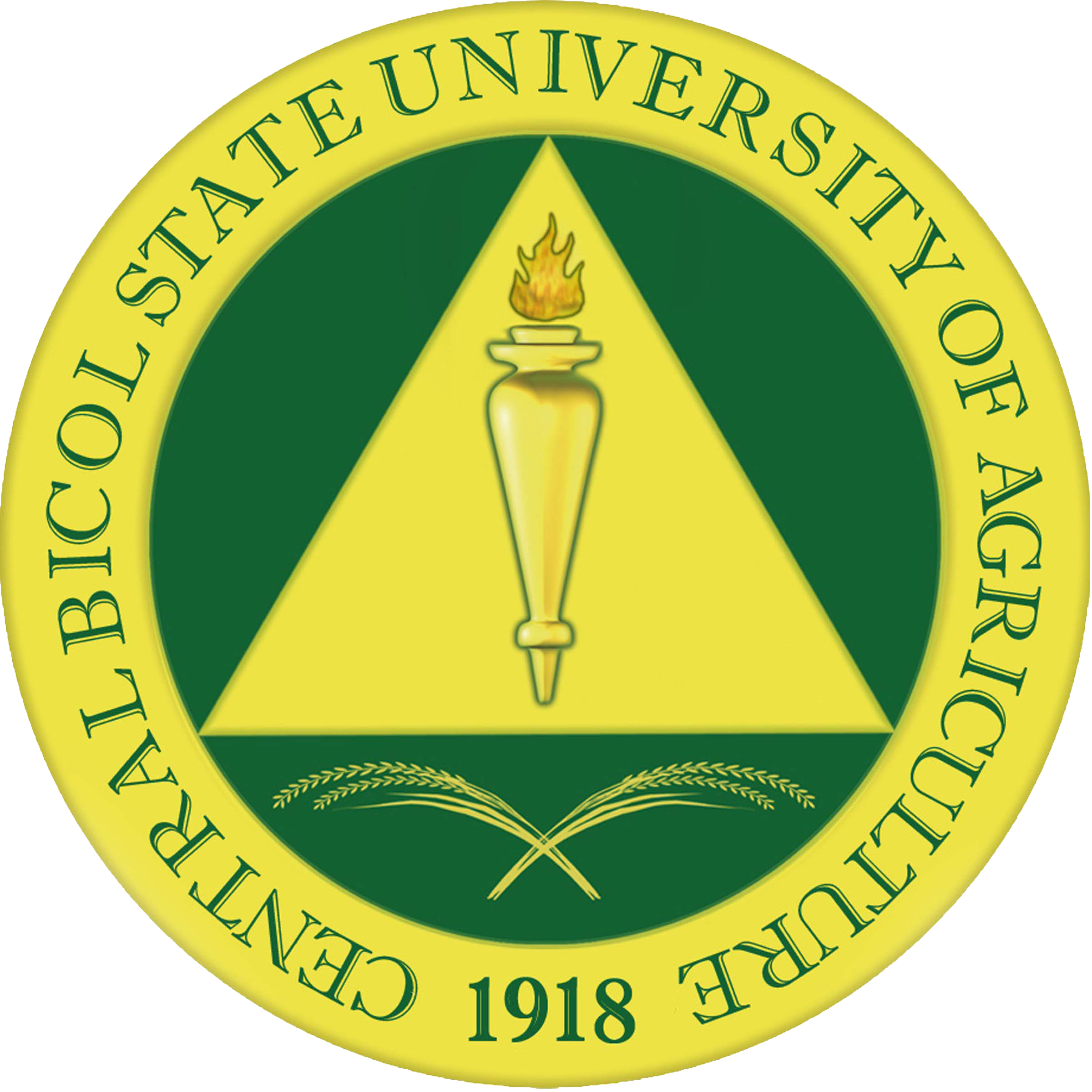
- Other name: CBSUA
- Former names: Camarines Sur Agricultural School (1918-1925); Camarines Sur Agricultural High School (1925-1954)); Camarines Sur Regional Agricultural School (1954-1960); Camarines Sur National Agricultural College (1960-1982); Camarines Sur State Agricultural College (1982-2009)
- Motto: Excellence in Agriculture and Industrial Technology
- Type: State University
- Established: 1918; 108 years ago
- President: Dr. Ramona Isabel S. Ramirez
- Location: Barangay San Jose, Pili, Camarines Sur, Philippines; 13°34′54″N 123°15′42″E
- Campus: Main Pili, Camarines Sur (736 hectares (1,820 acres)) Satellite; Pasacao; Sipocot; Calabanga
- Colors: Green and Yellow
- Sporting affiliations: SCUAA
- Website: www.cbsua.edu.ph

The Central Bicol State University of Agriculture (Filipino: Pamantasang Pampamahalaan sa Agrikultura ng Gitnang Bikol), or simply referred to by its acronym CBSUA, is a state university in the province of Camarines Sur, Philippines. It envisions itself as an agricultural research university of global standards.

Founded in 1918, the university is now SUC level IV and ISO 9001:2015 accredited. Its main campus is in the capital town of Pili, while its other campuses are located in Pasacao, Sipocot, and Calabanga. It is the regional center for higher learning in agriculture in the Bicol Region.

== History ==
=== 1918-1946 ===
CBSUA was founded in 1918 as farm school under Director Francis B. Harrison and Superintendent George C. Kindley. It was an intermediate school offering agricultural courses for boys and was known as Camarines Agricultural School (CAS). In 1923, Victor Oblifis became the superintendent. CAS changed into a national secondary under the name Camarines Agricultural High School (CAHS).

In 1928, William Pickell became superintendent, serving for two years. During this period, CAHS was changed to a provincial level school with a principal as head instead of a superintendent.

In 1930, Zosimo Montemayor became the first principal, followed by Santiago Medrana in 1936 and Camilo C. Guevara in 1938. In 1942, Guevara was forced to leave his position due to safety concerns from the Japanese Occupation of the Philippines. Delfin D. Divinagracia Sr. served as the officer-in-charge until 1945, Guevara returned as principal in 1946 and started repairing war damage.

=== 1950-1979 ===
In 1954, CAHS was moved into the regional level as the Camarines Sur Regional Agricultural School (CSRAS), which offered systematized agricultural courses. In 1956 CSRAS started offering two-year technical college course of Associate in Agriculture. In 1956, Guevarra retired in 1960.

In 1962, Leoncio Meneses became the superintendent of the school. It was during his term that the school acquired its national status and was named Camarines Sur National Agricultural School (CSNAS). The school then offered a four-year course in Bachelor of Science in education.

Alvaro R. Rabina became the superintendent of CSNAS in 1972 which later turned to Camarines Sur Agricultural College (CSAC) and offered an additional four-year course, the Bachelor of Science in agriculture (BSA) and in 1974 the two-year agricultural technician course.

In 1975, the college was designated by the Secretary of the Department of Education and Culture as an accrediting institution for the degree of Master of Arts in Teaching Elementary Agriculture (MATEA).

Ciriaco N. Divinagracia, the then incumbent research director of the college established a strong linkage between CSAC and the Philippine Council of Agricultural Resources and Research Development (PCARRD) in 1977 which led to CSAC being the base station of the Bicol Agricultural Research Consortium (BARC) in 1979. In the same year, Rabina also affirmed a strong linkage with USAID that made the college as one of the implementing schools of the Agricultural Education Outreach Project (AEOP).

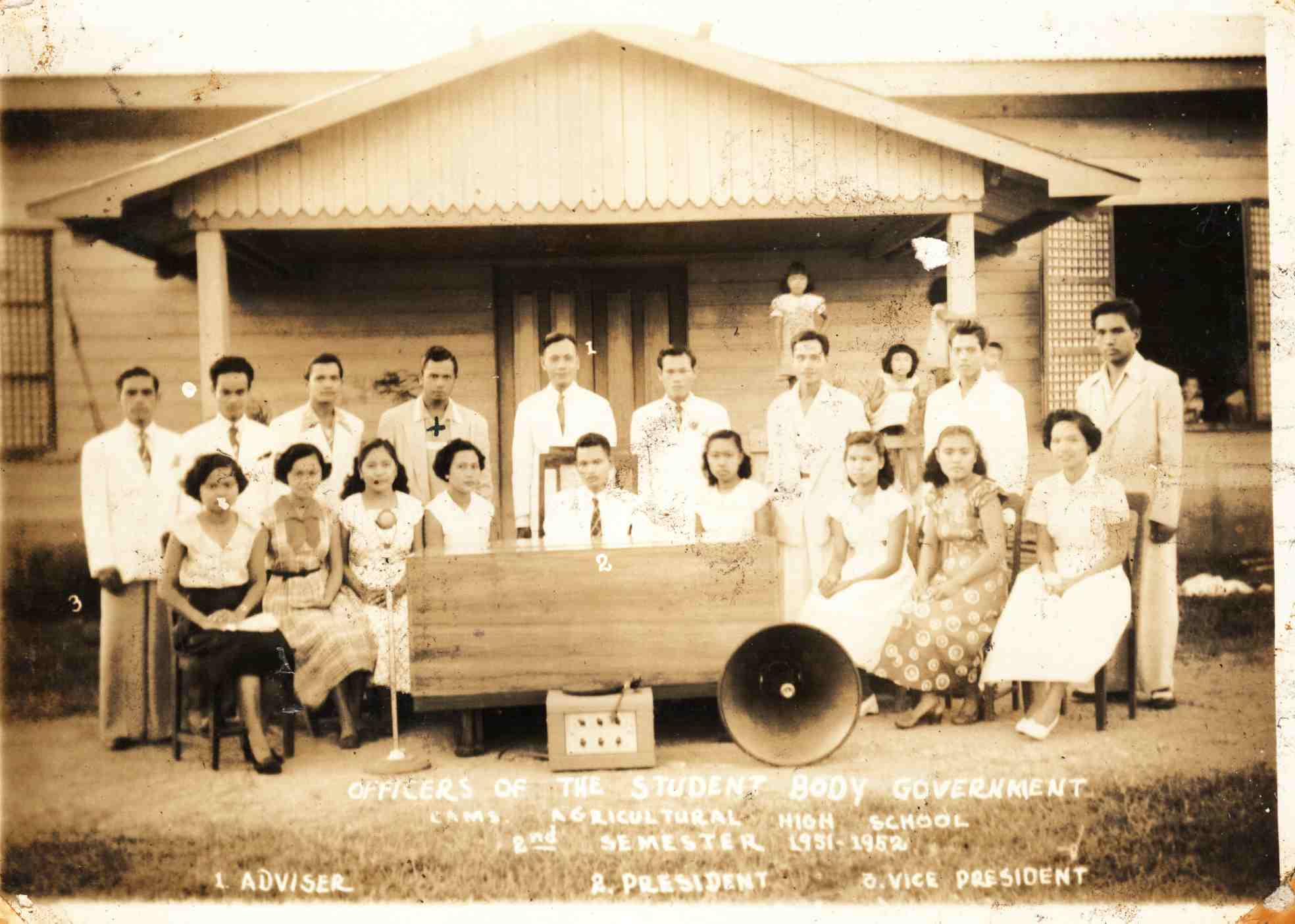
Officers of the Student Body Government Camarines Agricultural High School second semester 1951-1952

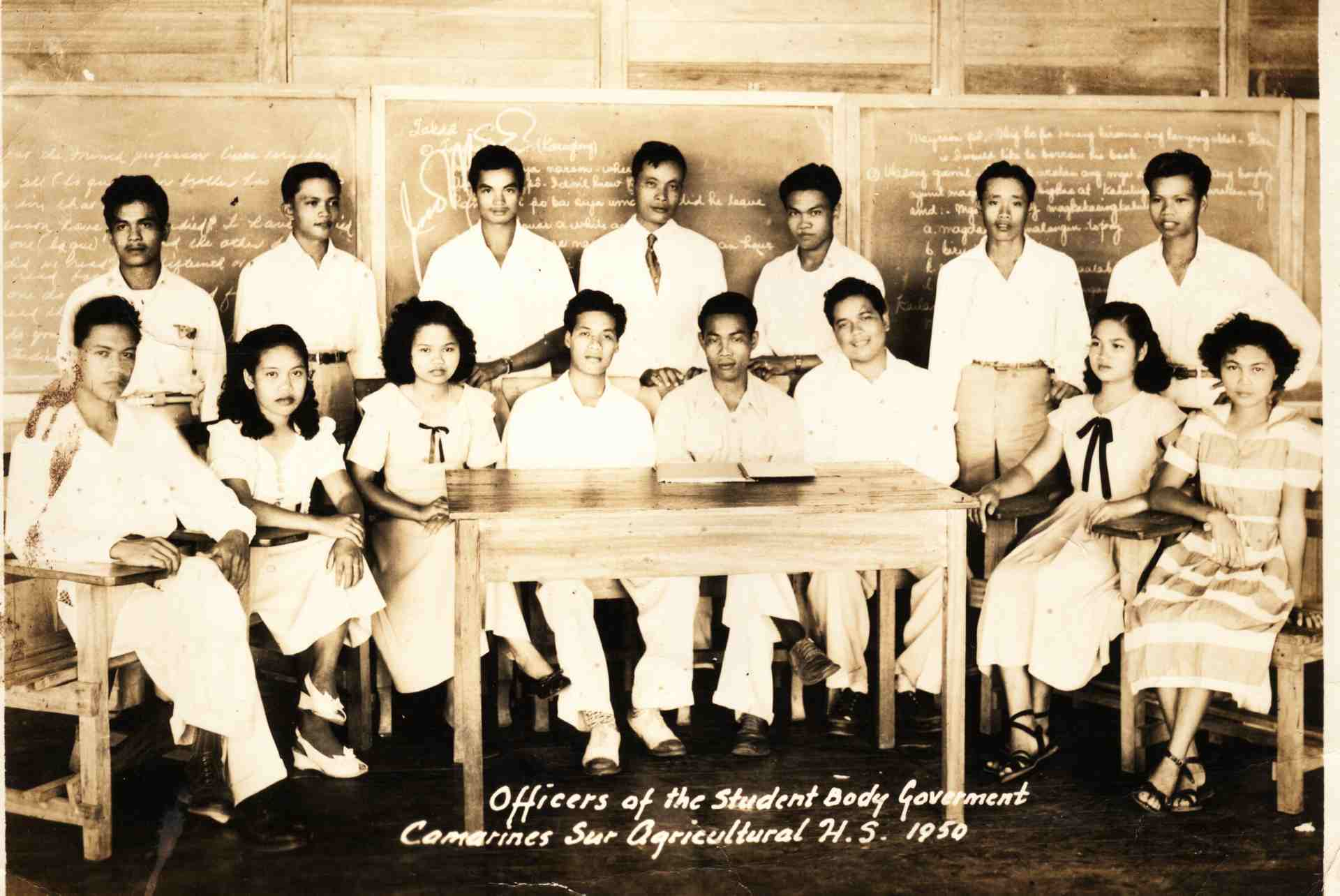
A photograph of Student Body Government Officers of the Camarines Sur Agricultural High School taken in 1950

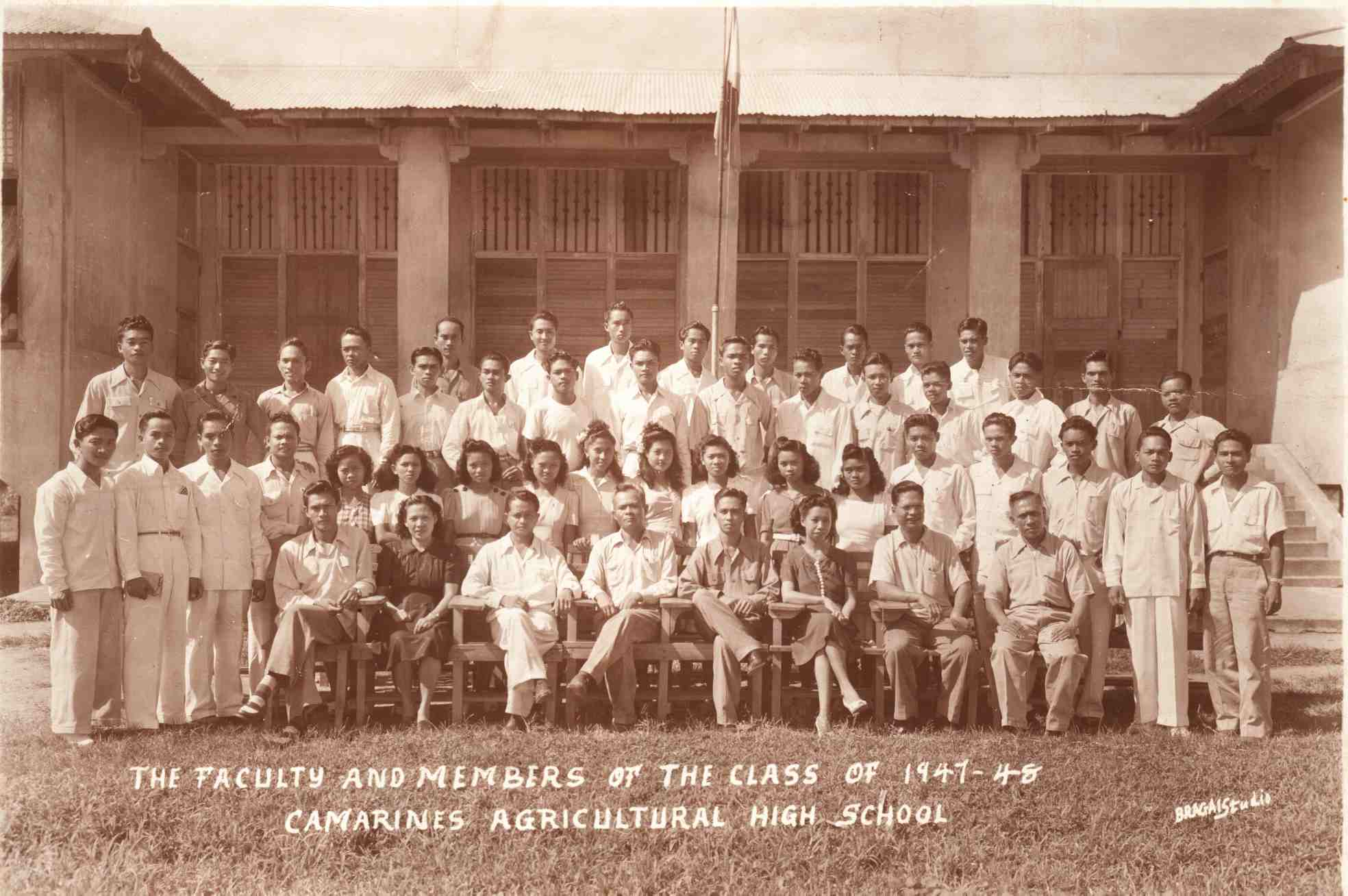
A class photograph of the graduates and members of the faculty of Camarines Sur Agricultural High School in 1948

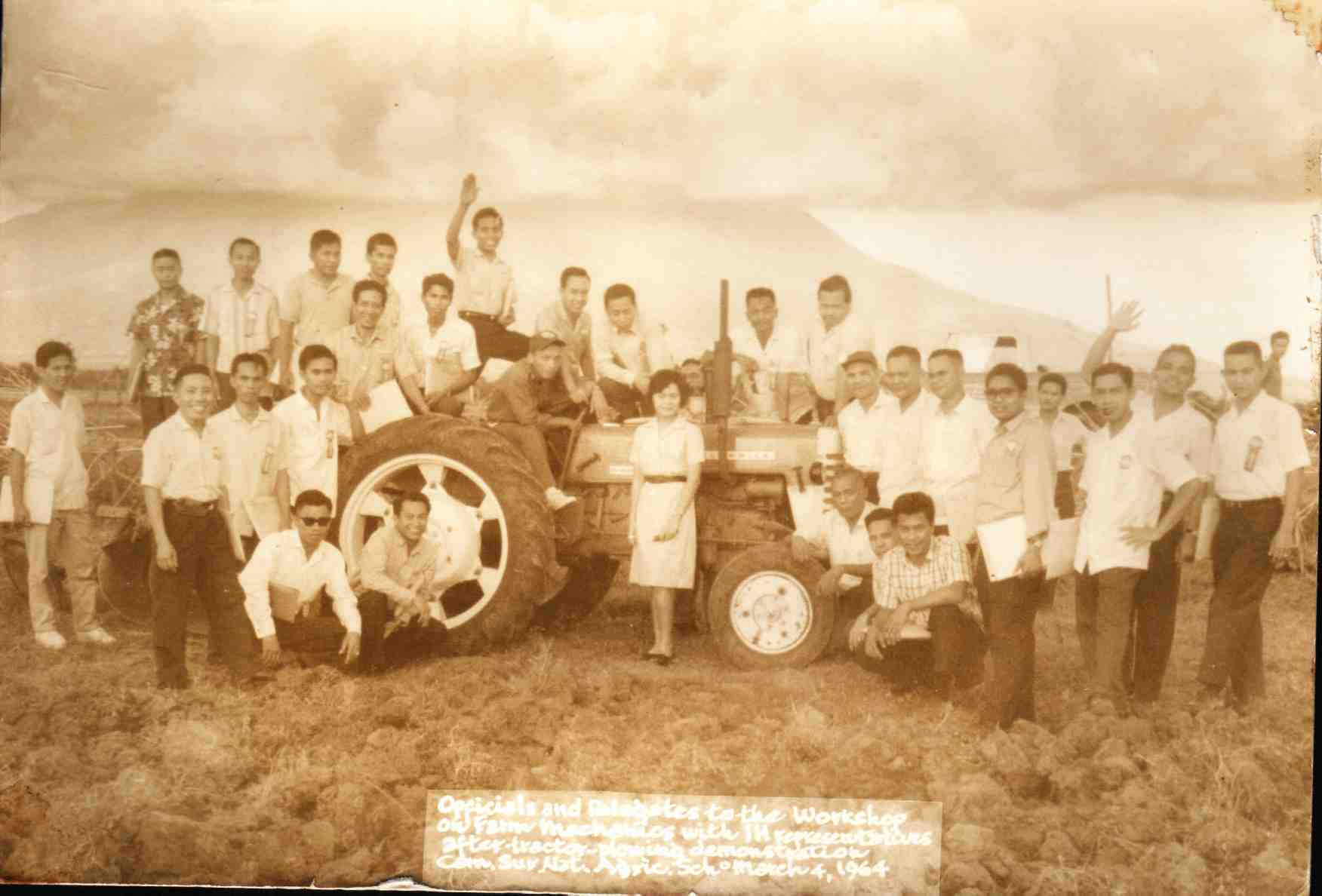
The officials and delegates to the 'Workshop on Farm Mechanics' with IH representatives after the tractor-plowing demonstration held on March 4, 1964

=== 1980-2010 ===
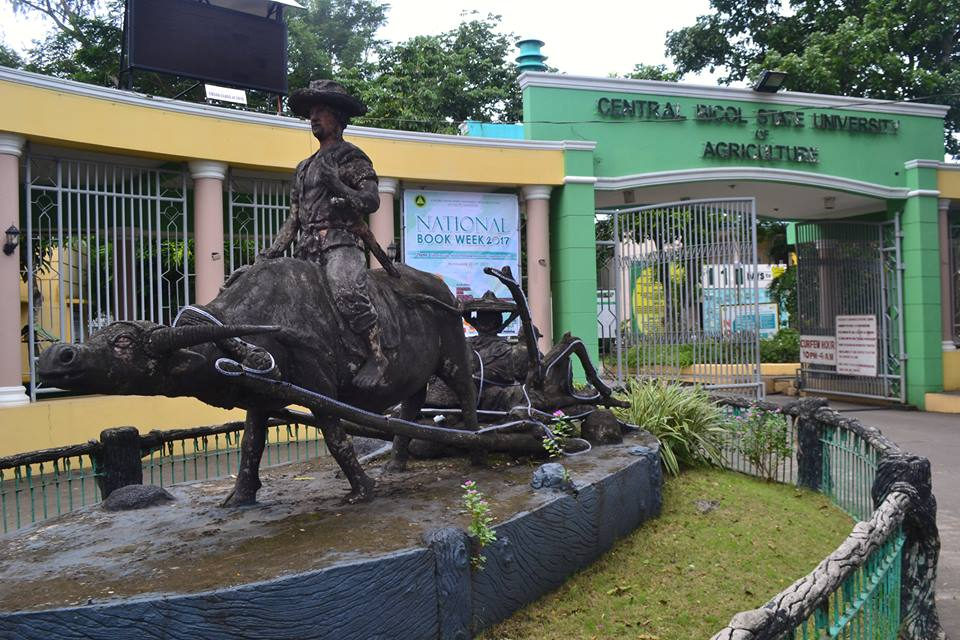
The Morning Way to the Fields Monument

In 1982, CSAC was elevated to the State College status and was named as Camarines Sur State Agricultural College (CSSAC), making Rabina the first College President serving the institution until 1983.

In 1984, Dr. Ciriaco N. Divinagracia became the Officer-in-Charge for the State College until he became the president in 1985. During his term, the college course offerings were expanded into six Bachelor of Science degrees: Bachelor of Science in agriculture, Bachelor of Science in agricultural engineering, Bachelor of Science in agricultural business, Bachelor of Science in food technology, Bachelor of Science in veterinary technology and Bachelor of Science in Agroforestry; and six masters programs: Master of Science in Resource Management, Master of Science in Management Extension, Master of Science in crop science, Master of Science in animal science, Master of Science in agricultural education, and Master of Science in crop protection.

The State College was identified as the Regional Research Center and the base agency of the Bicol Consortium for Agriculture and Resources Development (BICARRD) in 1985 and as the Regional Agricultural College by the 1986 Constitution and Executive No. 117 known as National Agricultural Education System (NAES) in 1989.

In 1997, Dr. Magno S. Conag was designated Officer-in-Charge until he was appointed on January 8, 1998. Under his term, a new curriculum was implemented as well as additional baccalaureate and graduate studies programs namely: Entomology, Environmental Science, Postharvest Pathology, Postharvest Entomology, Doctor of Philosophy in Development Education and Doctor of Philosophy in Plant Science.

In 2000, the State College expanded its institutional frontiers with the integration of CHED-supervised institutions: Calabanga Polytechnic College in Calabanga, Bicol Institute of Science and Technology in Sipocot and the Pasacao Extension Campus. Dr. Wilfredo G. Olaño, became the President of the State College in 2002.

Since 2002, the State College offered 26 undergraduate programs in four campuses. It has also strengthened its Extension programs focusing on Community Learning program like the Bayanihan Learning Community (BLC), Continuing Education and Training program, Publication and Communications Materials Development program, Monitoring and Evaluation, and Linkages and Special Projects which has become the core value of the Extension Services.

In 2007, Atty. Marito T. Bernales assumed the presidency. During this time, the state college was also undergoing preparations for its application to becoming a State University. In 2009, CSSAC was converted to CBSUA. The conversion led to development in instruction, research, extension, production and governance. Various University infrastructures have been upgraded.

On 12 October 2009, by virtue of Republic Act No. 9717, the Camarines Sur State Agricultural College was converted into a state university to be known as the Central Bicol State University of Agriculture. In the same year, the university started offering a new course on Bachelor of Science in Agri-Ecotourism.

=== 2010-present ===
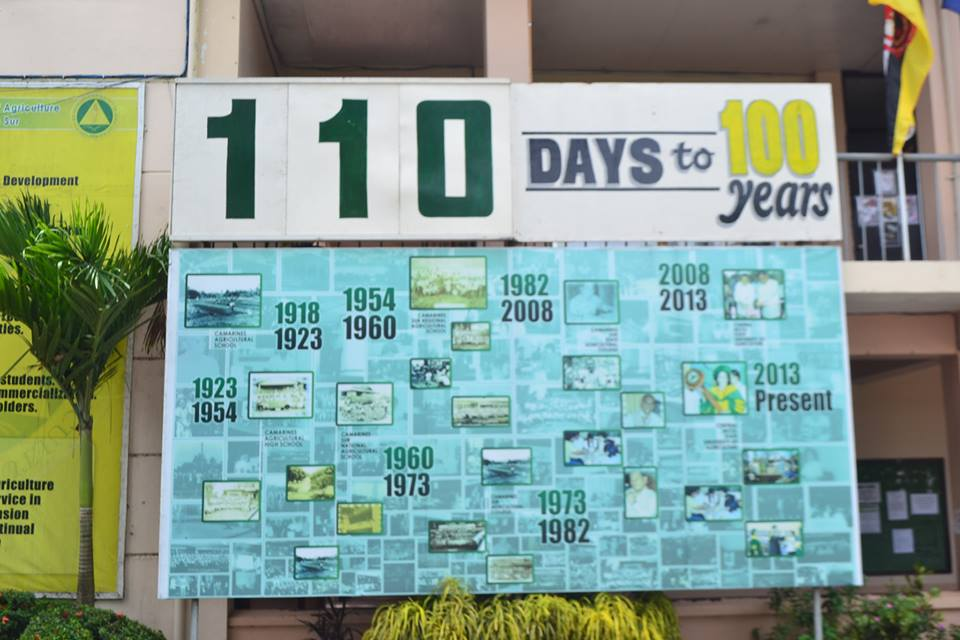
Centennial Countdown Board in the Main Campus

Bernales led the university in gaining various recognitions and international engagement as the university partnered with the Israeli government deploying its first batch of Interns for the Agrostudies Internship Program coordinated by the then College of Agriculture and Natural Resources Dean, Dr. Leonardo Sureta in 2010.

In 2014, Georgina J. Bordado, DBM, former dean of the College of Economics and Management was declared the new president of the university. She is the first lady president who is an alumnus of the university.

It is during her presidency that the scope of the university in terms of international engagements reached its peak. In 2014, the university renewed its partnership with the Australian Volunteers for International Development (AVID) deploying Australian Volunteers to help the university in its flagship program in Organic Agriculture, thus, establishing the Organic Agriculture Development Program (OADP) and opening the first Organic Techno-Science Park in the university.

On the same year of 2014, the university deployed its first student exchange to the University of Tsukuba in Ibaraki, Japan as part of the partnership with the same university under the ASEAN International Mobility for Students (AIMS). The partnership also enabled the university to take advantage of the opportunities and ventured into the Trans-ASEAN Global Agenda Program. The university has sent two students who are currently in University of Tsukuba, taking up a four-year course under the scholarship provided by the AIMS. The course started in September 2015 and will end by 2019.

In 2016, the university was recognized as one of the Most Sustainable and Eco-Friendly Schools in the Philippines after winning the Nation Search for the Sustainable and Eco-Friendly Schools in the Philippines. In 2016, CBSUA was also recipient of the prestigious award the Saringaya Award given every two years by the Department of Environment and Natural Resources. The university was also awarded various recognitions such as the Bangko Sentral ng Pilipinas (BSP) award on Outstanding Regional Partner for Advocacy Implementation of the BSP Programs and the Selyo ng Kahusayan sa Wika at Kultura.

It is also on 2016 that the university in partnership with the Department of Science and Technology (DOST), Department of Trade and Industry (DTI) and the Food and Nutrition Regulation Institute (FNRI) established the first Complementary Food Processing Facility and Food Testing Laboratory in Camarines Sur which will help the Micro, Small and Medium Enterprises (MSME) in the region to test their products and help in the production of nutritional infant food as part of the university's campaign on Poverty Alleviation and Nutrition.

The university continues to be a Center of Development first in Agricultural and then Education and Teaching Education in the country and is known as one of the National University/College of Agriculture (NUCA) in the Philippines.

== Current officials ==
The current president of the university is Dr. Ramona Isabel S. Ramirez. Below are the current vice presidents in four (4) major sectors of the university.

Vice Presidents
| Academic Affairs | Dr. Melinda Parro-Pan |
| Administration and Financial | Atty. Dominador F. Faurillo |
| Research and Innovation | Dr. Dariel A. Palmiano |
| Business and External Affairs | Dr. Cherry Love B. Montales |

== Gallery ==
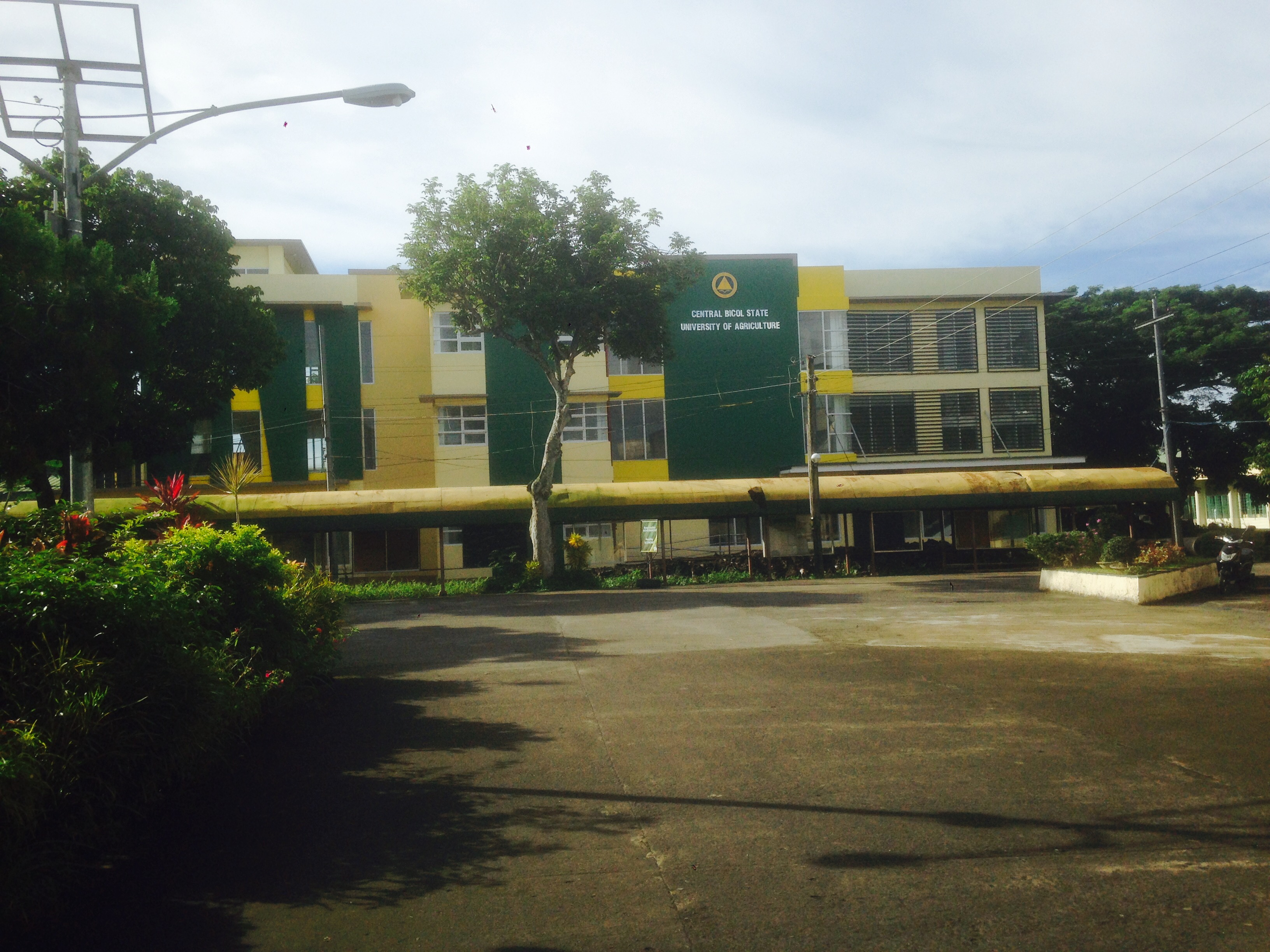
Administration Building

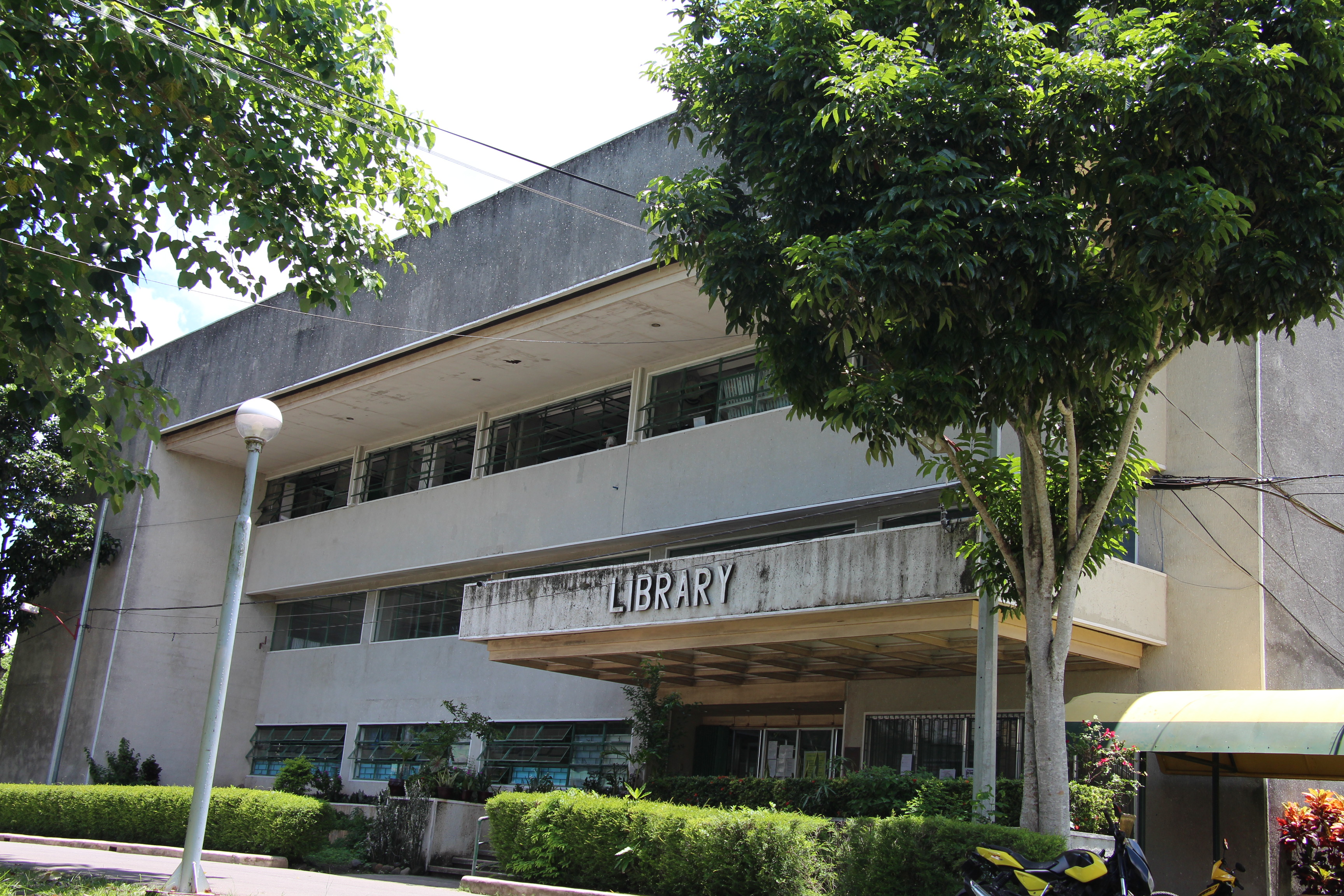
Main Library

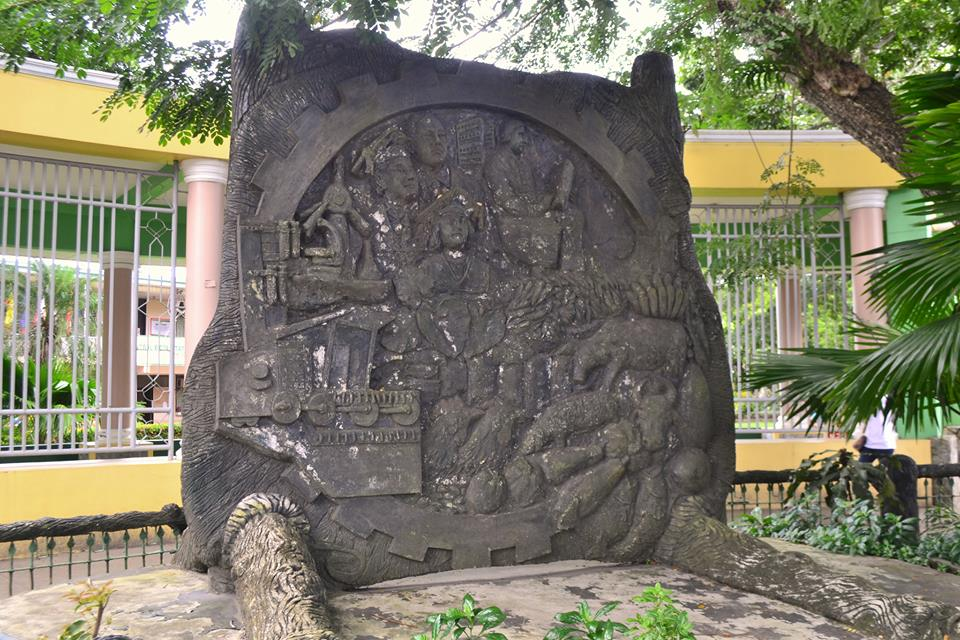
The Fruits of the Earth Monument

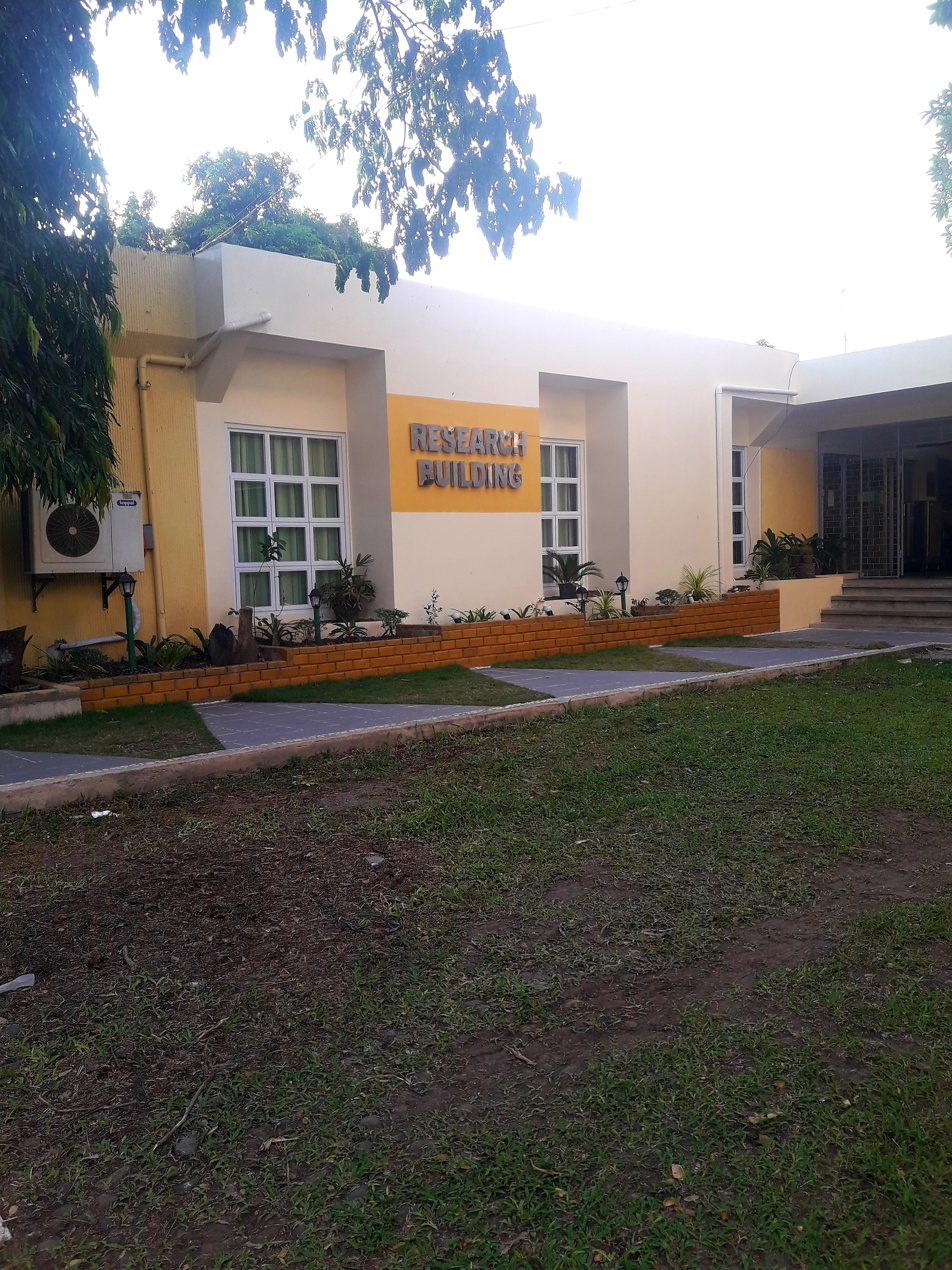
Research Building

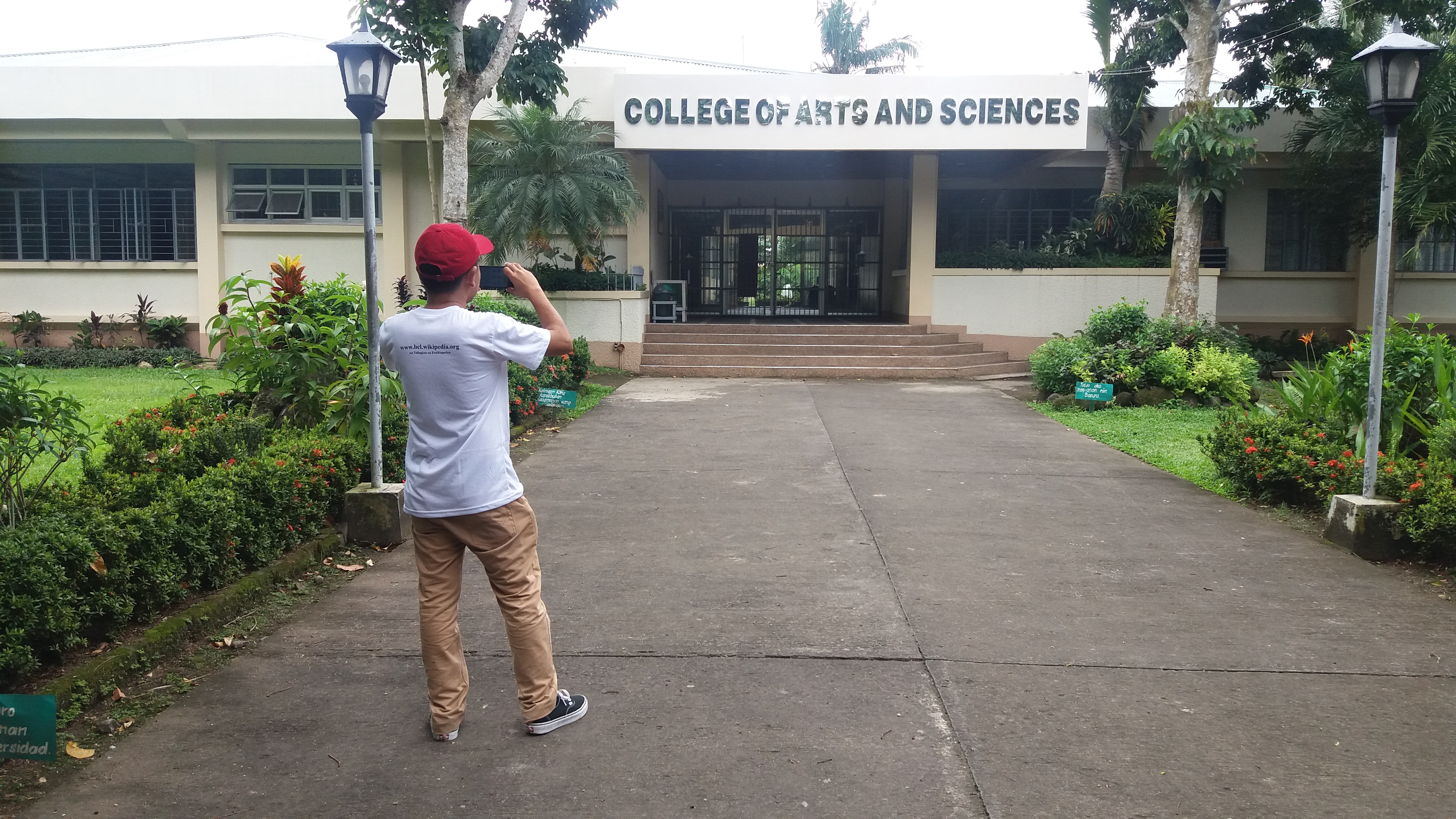
College of Arts and Science

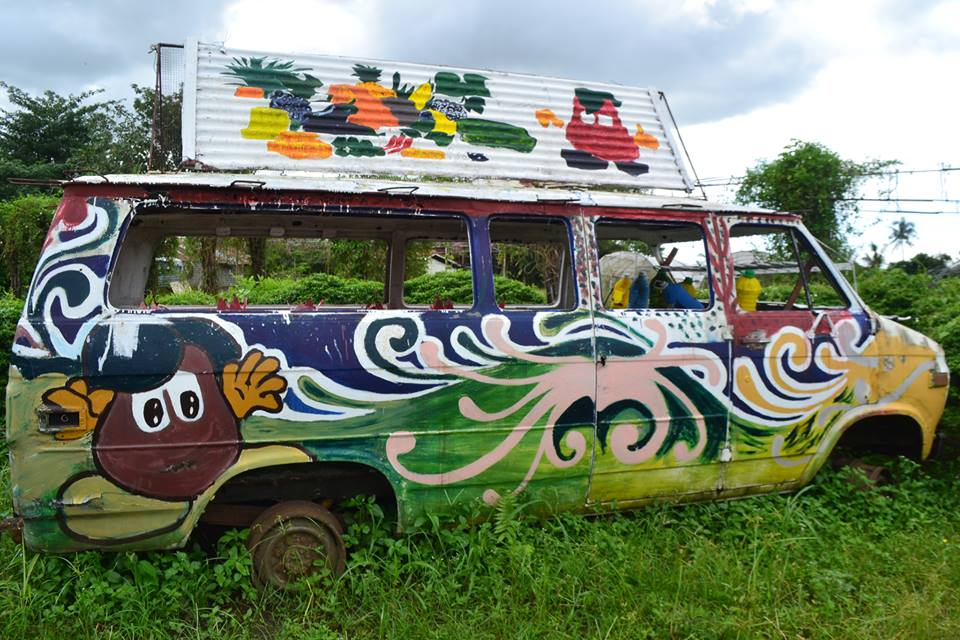
Organic Garden's Recycled Car
