= Dariel Palmiano =

Filipino writer and administrator

Dariel Ansay Palmiano

Personal details
- Education: Naga College Foundation
- Occupation: Educator

Dariel Ansay Palmiano is a Filipino educator, author, and current Vice President for Research and Innovation of Central Bicol State University of Agriculture (CBSUA), one of the oldest universities in the Philippines. He authored the books Logic Makes Sense (2010) and Philosophy of the Human Person (Prince Chariel Publishing House, 2015), and co-authored several academic works including Belief Persistence and Reliance on Traditional Healing of Students at Central Bicol State University of Agriculture with Yvette Jonathan Molina.

Before his current post as a state university vice president, he served as the campus administrator of CBSUA-Calabanga.

He is an Associate Member of the National Research Council of the Philippines (NRCP), an assembly of scientists, researchers, and innovators advancing research and development.

Academic offices
Preceded by Ramona Isabel Salcedo Ramirez	Vice President for Research and Innovation of the Central Bicol State University of Agriculture; 2025–present	Incumbent
Preceded by Cornelio Funtanar	Campus Administrator of the Central Bicol State University of Agriculture-Calabanga; 2024–2025	Succeeded by Jeremy Delloso
