= Ramona Isabel Ramirez =

- Citizenship: Filipino
- Education: Bicol University
- Occupation: Educator

Ramona Isabel Salcedo Ramirez is a Filipino academic, researcher, and university administrator who became the fourth president of the Central Bicol State University of Agriculture (CBSUA) in Pili, Camarines Sur, Philippines. Before she was appointed university president, she served as CBSUA's Vice President for Research and Innovation. Her academic work and research interests include chemistry education, climate change adaptation, disaster risk reduction, and agricultural research.

In 2026, she was appointed as the fourth president of the Central Bicol State University of Agriculture, succeeding Alberto Naperi, the university's previous administration.
