= Australian Volunteers for International Development =

The Australian Volunteers for International Development (AVID) program is an initiative of the Australian Government's Department of Foreign Affairs and Trade. The AVID program provides Australians with the opportunity to share their skills and establish connections with individuals and organizations in developing countries, as part of Australia's overseas aid initiative. This program is administered by three Core Partners on behalf of the Australian Government: Scope Global (formerly known as Austraining International), Australian Volunteers International, and the Australian Red Cross. Volunteers in the program come from diverse backgrounds, spanning ages 18 to 80, and they contribute various professional expertise. This diversity allows them to engage in a range of activities, such as assisting in the establishment of medical clinics for safe childbirth, constructing resilient homes to withstand cyclones, and supporting children with disabilities in accessing education.

The AVID program connects volunteers with Host Organizations (HOs) in regions like Asia, the Pacific, and Africa. These HOs encompass a wide range of entities, including government departments, international agencies, non-governmental organizations (NGOs) at various levels (local, national, and international), educational institutions, research institutes, and private companies. Each assignment is aligned with the priorities of the Australian Government and is tailored to meet the specific needs of the host country. Additionally, the AVID program collaborates with Australian Partner Organizations (APOs) to facilitate and support Australian volunteer assignments. APOs, which comprise Australian government departments, NGOs, educational institutions, and private companies, aim to establish connections with development-focused organizations in Asia, the Pacific, and Africa. For instance, APOs collaborate with HOs to create volunteer assignment proposals, promote opportunities to potential volunteers, and offer guidance and assistance to volunteers during their assignments. It's important to note that HOs can submit assignments to the AVID program independently of APOs.
