= List of Philippine historic sites =

Historic sites in the Philippines are designated by the National Historical Commission of the Philippines (NHCP) and its predecessor agencies through the installation of historical markers (Filipino: panandang pangkasaysayan). The following are lists of NHCP historical markers by region:

- National Capital Region
- Cordillera Administrative Region
- Region I: Ilocos Region
- Region II: Cagayan Valley
- Region III: Central Luzon
- Region IV-A: Calabarzon
- Region IV-B: Mimaropa
- Region V: Bicol Region
- Region VI: Western Visayas
- Region VII: Central Visayas
- Region VIII: Eastern Visayas
- Region IX: Zamboanga Peninsula
- Region X: Northern Mindanao
- Region XI: Davao Region
- Region XII: Soccsksargen
- Region XIII: Caraga
- Bangsamoro Autonomous Region in Muslim Mindanao

== See also ==
- Lists of Cultural Properties of the Philippines
- List of National Cultural Treasures in the Philippines
- National Historical Commission of the Philippines
