= List of Cultural Properties of the Philippines in Bangsamoro =

This list contains an overview of the government recognized Cultural Properties of the Philippines in Bangsamoro. The list is based on the official lists provided by the National Commission on Culture and the Arts, National Historical Commission of the Philippines and the National Museum of the Philippines.

Cultural Property wmph identifier (Note: wmph is an internal identifier used by Wikimedia Philippines to identify the monument. This is not an official identifier, and only shown temporarily in the templates until the government creates an updated complete list.)	Site name	Description	Province	City or municipality	Address	Coordinates	Image
PH-12-0001	Church of the Immaculate Conception of Tamontaka	Built by the Jesuits by the Tamontaka River in 1872 as part of the Tamontaka Mission to oversee the welfare of the youth and to spread the Gospel in the Cotabato region. A school for the boys were built under the Jesuits and for the girls under the Religious of the Virgin Mary. Transferred to its present site in 1879 and became the center of Jesuit missions. Abandoned in 1899 and was placed under the administration of the Jesuits in Zamboanga. It became part of the Cotabato Mission of the Oblates of Mary Immaculate in 1939. The church was destroyed by the August 17, 1976 earthquake, it was rebuilt in 1978. A fire burned down the church in 1994 and was rebuilt in the same year. Declared a National Historical Landmark on July 19, 2004. (See marker)	—	Cotabato City	Conception Street, Tamontaka	7°11′01″N 124°13′20″E	Upload file
PH-12-0002	Notre Dame Archdiocesan Seminary		Maguindanao del Norte	Sultan Kudarat 9605	Quezon Avenue	7°15′30″N 124°16′39″E	Upload Photo
PH-12-0003	Fort Pikit	Among the forts built during the Spanish regime to conquer Mindanao and prevent the Moros from asserting their independence from the colonial government, 1893. Used by the American forces and Philippine Constabulary composed of Christian and Muslim Filipinos. Occupied by Japanese forces, 1942–1945. Recovered by American forces to free eastern part of Mindanao, April 1945. Served as a Philippine Marine Corps station until 2005. Declared as a National Historical Landmark on April 24, 2012.	Cotabato (Note: Fort Pikit is in Cotabato, a province part of the Soccsksargen region. However Fort Pikit is in barangay Fort Pikit which is part of Bangsamoro's Special Geographic Area.)	Pikit			Upload file
PH-14-0001	Torogan House		Lanao del Sur	Pompongan-a-Marantao, Marawi			Upload Photo
PH-14-0002	Oblates of Notre Dame		Maguindanao del Norte	Datu Odin Sinsuat			Upload Photo
PH-14-0003	Camp Brigadier General Salipada K. Pendatun		Maguindanao del Norte	Parang			Upload Photo
PH-14-0004	Sheik Karimol Mahkdum Shrine		Tawi-Tawi	Tandu Banak, Sibutu			Upload Photo
PH-14-0005	Sheik Karimol Mahkdum Mosque		Tawi-Tawi	Tubig Indangan, Simunul			Upload file

== See also ==
- List of historical markers of the Philippines in Bangsamoro
