= List of historical markers of the Philippines in the Bicol Region =

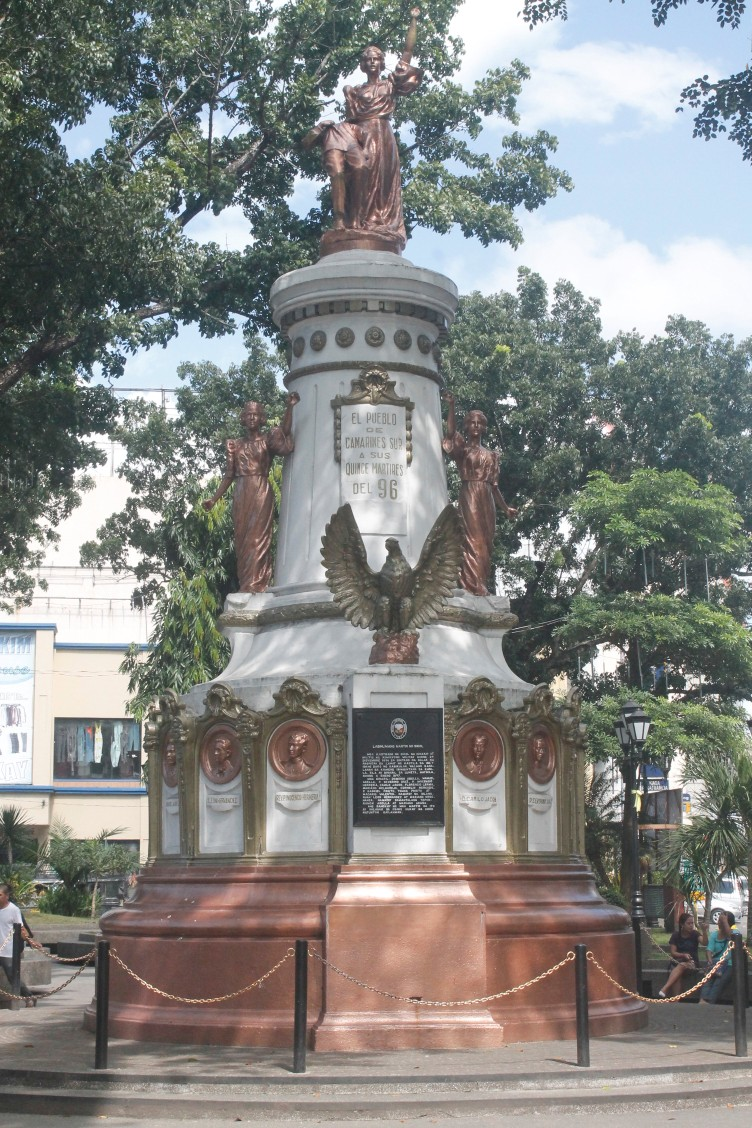
Fifteen Martyrs of Bicol monument and historical marker in Naga, Camarines Sur

This list of historical markers installed by the National Historical Commission of the Philippines (NHCP) in the Bicol Region (Region V) is an annotated list of people, places, or events in the region that have been commemorated by cast-iron plaques issued by the said commission. The plaques themselves are permanent signs installed in publicly visible locations on buildings, monuments, or in special locations.

While many Cultural Properties have historical markers installed, not all places marked with historical markers are designated into one of the particular categories of Cultural Properties.

This article lists 75 markers from the Bicol Region.

== Albay ==
This table lists 21 markers from the province of Albay.

Marker title	Description	Location	Language	Date issued	Image
Angela Manalang Gloria (1907–1995)	First Filipina poet to write and publish poems in English. Became editor of Philippines Herald Magazine.	Tabaco City	Filipino	2007	
Bahay-Kalakal ng Smith, Bell & Co. Tabaco, Albay (Note: Commercial building of Smith, Bell & Co.: Tabaco, Albay)	Built by Mariano Villanueva during the 19th century. Became known as one of the largest houses in Tabaco.	Tabaco City	Filipino	2007	
Bicol Regional Training and Teaching Hospital	Started as a military reserve hospital under the Regan Barracks Reservation.	Legazpi City	Filipino	September 3, 2018	
Church of Cagsaua	Almost buried due to an 1814 Mayon eruption by ash, rocks, and mud.	Daraga	English	1940	
Church of Cagsaua	Ruins of Cagsaua Church. The church was destroyed by the eruption of Mayon Volcano on February 1, 1814.	Daraga	English	1954	
Church of Legazpi	The present church was built in 1834. Legaspi was formerly called Puevlo Viejo until 1856.	Legazpi City	English	1940	
Church of Oas	Built by Franciscans, 1605. Fray Marcos de Lisbo served as first curate.	Oas	English	1950	
Simbahan ng Camalig (Note: Church of Camalig)	Founded by the Franciscans. Administered by Franciscans for four centuries, from 1579 to 1983.	Camalig	Filipino	December 15, 2014	
Camilo Jacob	One of the Fifteen Martyrs of Bicol. A mason from Camarines who sought better conditions for the country.	Polangui	Filipino	March 7, 2017	
Church of Tabaco	Church built by Franciscans in 1587. Became an independent parish in 1664.	Tabaco City	English	June 22, 2012	
Heneral Jose Ignacio Paua; Heneral na Tsino sa Himagsikang Pilipino (Note: General Jose Ignacio: Chinese General of the Philippine Revolution)	Chinese immigrant-turned-general who served in the revolution.	Legazpi City	Filipino	July 12, 1989	
The International Chamber of Commerce of Albay	Founded on August 13, 1904 by Filipino, American, Spanish, Chinese, and English businessmen.	Legazpi City	English	1940	
Katedral ng Albay (Note: Cathedral of Albay)	Established by the Franciscans as a visita of Cagsaua in 1587. Established the first church in 1616 under the patronage of St. Gregory the Great.	Legazpi City	Filipino	September 3, 2018	
Labanan sa Legazpi (Note: Battle of Legazpi)	On January 23, 1900, about 800 Filipinos under Com. Antonio Reyes fought the Americans.	Legazpi City	Filipino	January 23, 2001	
Pagdaong sa Legazpi (Note: Landing at Legazpi)	American forces landing on April 1, 1945. Together with the guerrillas, the San Bernardino Strait was recovered from the Japanese.	Legazpi City	Filipino	2008	
Potenciano V. Gregorio, Sr.	Famous musician and composer. Studied music under the guidance of Mons. Jorge Barlin.	Santo Domingo	Filipino	May 19, 2005	
Simbahan ng Daraga (Note: Church of Daraga)	First stone church by Franciscans in 1773. Where citizens of Cagsaua relocated after the 1814 Mayon eruption.	Daraga	Filipino	October 16, 2008	
Simeon Arboleda Ola (1865–1952)	General of the revolutions against both the Spanish and the American.	Guinobatan	Filipino	September 25, 2003	
St. Agnes' Academy	Built by German Benedictine Sisters of Tutzing, July 1, 1912. Secondary school was opened in June 1917.	Legazpi City	Filipino	2012	
Tabaco Presidencia Building	Neoclassical building built in 1929 under architect Juan Arellano.	Tabaco Municipal Hall, Tabaco City	Filipino	March 24, 2023	
Town of Cagsaua	Previously occupied by the town of Cagsaua, which was destroyed by the Mayon eruption of February 1, 1814.	Daraga	English	1940	

== Camarines Norte ==
This table lists 12 markers from the province of Camarines Norte.

Marker title	Description	Location	Language	Date issued	Image
(untitled)	First Rizal Monument in the Philippines. Unveiled on December 30, 1898.	Daet	English	1961	
Bantayog Para Sa Kapayapaan (Note: Monument for Peace)	Site of where witnesses saw the first shot of USAFFE Camarines Norte Station of Wenceslao Vinzons against the Japanese.	Basud	Filipino	1980	
Bahay ni Wenceslao Vinzons (Note: House of Wenceslao Vinzons)		Vinzons	Filipino	September 28, 2024	
Birthplace of Wenceslao Q. Vinzons	Born on September 28, 1910. Organized troops during World War II.	Vinzons	English	1950	
Jose Ma. Panganiban y Enverga (1863–1890)	Propagandist born on February 1, 1863. Translator of the La Solidaridad.	Jose Panganiban	Filipino	February 1, 1985	
Jose P. Rizal	Memorial to José Rizal. Once the biggest Rizal monument outside of Metro Manila.	Rizal Square, Kalayaan Park, in front of provincial capitol, Daet	Filipino	June 19, 1991	
Martir ng Camarines Norte (Note: Martyr of Camarines Norte)	Monument to Katipunan revolutionaries of 1898 who offered their lives.	Daet	Filipino	June 23, 1992	
Pambansang Palatandaang Pangkasaysayan ni Vinzons (Note: Vinzons National Historical Monument)	Declared as a national historical landmark by the NHCP.	Vinzons Shrine	Filipino	September 28, 1977	
Paracale	Established as a Franciscan mission in 1581. Reached its height in gold mining in 1936.	Paracale	Filipino	December 20, 1981	
Simbahang San Pedro Apostol (Note: Church of St. Peter the Apostle)	Oldest church in Camarines Norte. The town was established in 1581.	Vinzons	Filipino	June 29, 1980	
Sitio del Nacimiento de Jose Maria Panganiban (Note: Birthplace of Jose Maria Panganiban)	Birthplace of Jose Maria Panganiban, who was born on February 1, 1863.	Jose Panganiban	Spanish		
Wenceslao Q. Vinzons	Lawyer, patriot, and soldier. Governor of Camarines Sur in 1940. World War II hero.	Vinzons	English	September 28, 1991	

== Camarines Sur ==
This table lists 32 markers from the province of Camarines Sur.

Marker title	Description	Location	Language	Date issued	Image
Church of Baao	First built in 1684, at the junction of Langday and Bahay Rivers.	Baao	English	1939	
Church of Bula	Town dates back to 1578. The present church was completed in 1706.	Bula	English	1939	
Church of Buhi	Present church was built by Rev. Angel Malumbre, O.F.M. between 1870-1884.	Buhi	English	1939	
Church of Calabanga	The present church was constructed between 1874 and 1897.	Naga- Calabanga-Siruma-Partido North Road, Calabanga	English	1939	
Church of Iriga	The present church was constructed after the fire of 1841.	Iriga	English	1939	
Church of Magarao	The first church was destroyed by the earthquake of 1811. Present church was completed in 1849.	Magarao	English	1939	
Church of Milaor	First church started in 1725 and was completed in 1735. Present church was built in 1740.	Pan-Philippine Highway, Milaor	English	1939	
Church of Nabua	One of the oldest churches in the Bicol Region. Constructed in 1578 by the Franciscans.	Pan-Philippine Highway, Nabua	English	1939	
Church of Naga	Erected of Padi-an when the Diocese of Nueva Caceres was created by a papal bull on August 14, 1595.	Elias Angeles Street, Santa Cruz, CBD I, Naga City	English	1939	
Cathedral of Naga	First erected in 1595 for the creation of the Diocese of Nueva Caceres. The present cathedral was built between 1808-1843.	Naga Cathedral, Naga City	English	1950	
Church of Nuestra Señora de Peña de Francia	Early church built about 1711 dedicated to the Nuestra Señora de Peña de Francia.	Balatas Road, Balatas, Naga City	English	1940	
Church of San Francisco (Naga City)	Erected in 1578 out of light materials. The last Spanish governor of Ambos Camarines surrendered here to Elias Angeles and Felix Plazo on September 18, 1898.	Peñafrancia St., Naga City	English	1950; Re-unveiled, February 20, 2025	
Colegio de Santa Isabel	Blessed and opened on September 18, 1870. First normal school for girls in the Philippines.	Naga City	English	1939	
Domingo Abella	Healer and church historian. Became a director of the National Archives.	Iriga City	Filipino	May 2, 1982	
Jesse M. Robredo; 1958–2012	Mayor of Naga City. Became secretary of the Interior and Local Government.	Museo Jesse Robredo, Naga City	Filipino	August 18, 2017	
Jorge Barlin é Imperial (1850–1909)	First native Filipino bishop. Born on April 23, 1850. Was assigned to Sorsogon in 1896.	Barlin National Park, Baao	Filipino	April 23, 1988	
Jose Ma. Panganiban y Enverga	Member of the propaganda movement who pushed for freedom and speech and education.	Jose Maria Panganiban Monument, Naga Central School I, Naga City	Filipino	February 1, 2016; 1863-1890	
Holy Rosary Seminary	Town dates from 1578. The first church was also built during the same year.	Naga City	Filipino	September 9, 1988	
Hospital de San Lazaro	Founded by the Franciscans in 1586. Destroyed by the earthquake of 1907.				
Labinlimang Martir ng Bikol (Note: Fifteen Martyrs of Bicol)	Fifteen illustrados accused by Spanish as conspirators during the Philippine Revolution (1896-1898).	Elias Angeles Street, San Francisco, CBD I, Naga City	Filipino	May 2, 1982	
Ang Lungsod ng Iriga (Note: The City of Iriga)				September 13, 1969	
Ang Lungsod ng Naga (Note: The City of Naga)	Juan de Salcedo became the first European to set here in 1573. Became a merger of two towns to become Nueva Caceres.	Plaza Nueva Caceres, Naga City	Filipino	December 15, 1972	
Seminario de Santissimo Rosario (Note: Holy Rosary Minor Seminary)	Founded by the Rt. Rev. Domingo Collantes, O.P. in 1597 as part of the evangelization of the Bicol Region.	Elias Angeles Street, Santa Cruz, CBD I, Naga City	English	1939	
Philtranco Service Enterprises, Inc.	Established in 1914, became the first commuter bus company of the Americans in the Philippines.	Philtranco Transport Heritage Museum, Iriga	Filipino	July 6, 2000	
Seminary of Nueva Caceres	Founded on March 7, 1797 by Rev. Domingo Collantes, Bishop of Nueva Caceres.	Elias Angeles Street, San Francisco, CBD I, Naga City	English	1939	
Simbahan ng Canaman (Note: Church of Canaman)	At first, a doctrina of Nueva Caceres (Naga), 1583. Became an independent parish, 1599.	Canaman	Filipino	November 9, 2022	
Simbahan ng San Francisco (Note: Church of San Francisco)	First church in the Naga. First church built in 1575, but was bombed by Allied Forces during the World War II. Reconstructed in 1957.	Peñafrancia Avenue, San Francisco, CBD I, Naga City	Filipino	December 15, 1972	
Simbahan ni Nuestra Señora de Peñafrancia (Note: Church of Our Lady of Peñafrancia)	Constructed from 1742 to 1750. Spearheaded by Bishop Ysidore Arevalo.	Peñafrancia Avenue, San Felipe, Naga City	English	1939	
Simbahang Parokya ng Quipayo (Note: Parish Church of Quipayo)	One of the oldest churches in the Bicol Region. Was constructed in 1578.	Calabanga, Camarines Sur	Filipino	December 7, 1978	
Tangcong Vaca Guerilla Unit	Founded by Elias V. Madrid at Barrio San Nicolas, Canaman to fight off the Japanese during WWII.	Canaman	Filipino	March 8, 2017	
Universidad de Santa Isabel	Declared as a national historical landmark by the NHCP.	Naga City	Filipino	January 30, 2019	
University of Nueva Caceres	Established in 1948. Became a university on December 15, 1954.	Naga City	Filipino	2008	

== Catanduanes ==
This table lists two markers from the province of Catanduanes.

Marker title	Description	Location	Language	Date issued	Image
Dambana sa Batalan (Note: Shrine in Batalay)	Pilgrimage site of the burial site of Fr. Diego de Herrera, the first Christian missionary of the Legazpi-Urdaneta mission.	Batalay, Bato	Filipino	April 27, 1973	
Simbahan ng Bato (Note: Church of Bato)	Roman Catholic parish established by the Franciscans with the current church building erected in 1852. Damaged by typhoons and restored by the NHCP in 2020 and 2022.	Poblacion, Bato	Filipino	May 17, 2022	

== Masbate ==
There are no markers from the province of Masbate.

== Sorsogon ==
This table lists nine markers from the province of Sorsogon.

Marker title	Description	Location	Language	Date issued	Image
Ang Astilyero sa Isla ng Bagatao (Note: The Shipyard of Bagatao Island)	Founded under the administration of Governor General Juan de Silva, 1610.	Bagatao Island, Sorsogon City	Filipino	2007	
Ang Escuela Pia ng Prieto-Diaz (Note: The Escuela Pia of Prieto-Diaz)	Nineteenth century school made of corals. Now part of Prieto Diaz Central School.	Prieto Diaz	Filipino	2002	
Kapitolyo ng Sorsogon (Note: Capitol of Sorsogon)	Current neoclassical building was built under Governor Victor Eco from 1915 to 1917.	Sorsogon City	Filipino	October 17, 2018	
Mga Moog ng Bulusan (Note: The Forts of Bulusan)	Military forts built from 18th-19th century as defense against Moro raids.	Bulusan	Filipino	February 7, 2015	
Parola ng San Bernardino (Note: San Bernardino Lighthouse)	Inaugurated in 1896, have lights up to 19 miles.	Bulusan	Filipino	July 26, 2023	
Restoration Marker	Old Provincial Jail of Sorsogon restored and converted into a museum.	Sorsogon City	English	March 12, 2021	
Salvador Escudero Sr. 1887–1978	Guerilla warrior during WWII. Governor of Sorsogon, 1941, 1946-1955.	PNP Provincial Headquarters, Sorsogon City	Filipino	August 15, 2020	
Simbahan ng Bacon (Note: Church of Bacon)	Became a separate Franciscan parish under Father Antonio de San Francisco, 1671.	Bacon Church, Bacon, Sorsogon City	Filipino	September 20, 2021	
Simbahan ng Barcelona (Note: Church of Barcelona)	Church erected in 1874 and made out of corals; restored by the NHCP in 2020.	Barcelona	Filipino	September 25, 2020	

== See also ==
- List of Cultural Properties of the Philippines in the Bicol Region

== Bibliography ==
- National Historical Institute (1994). Historical Markers: Regions V-XIII. National Historical Institute.
- National Historical Institute (2008). Historical Markers (1992 - 2006). National Historical Institute.
- A list of sites and structures with historical markers, as of 16 January 2012
- A list of institutions with historical markers, as of 16 January 2012
