= First José Rizal Monument =

Monument in Daet, Camarines Norte, Philippines

- Unang Bantayog ni José Rizal
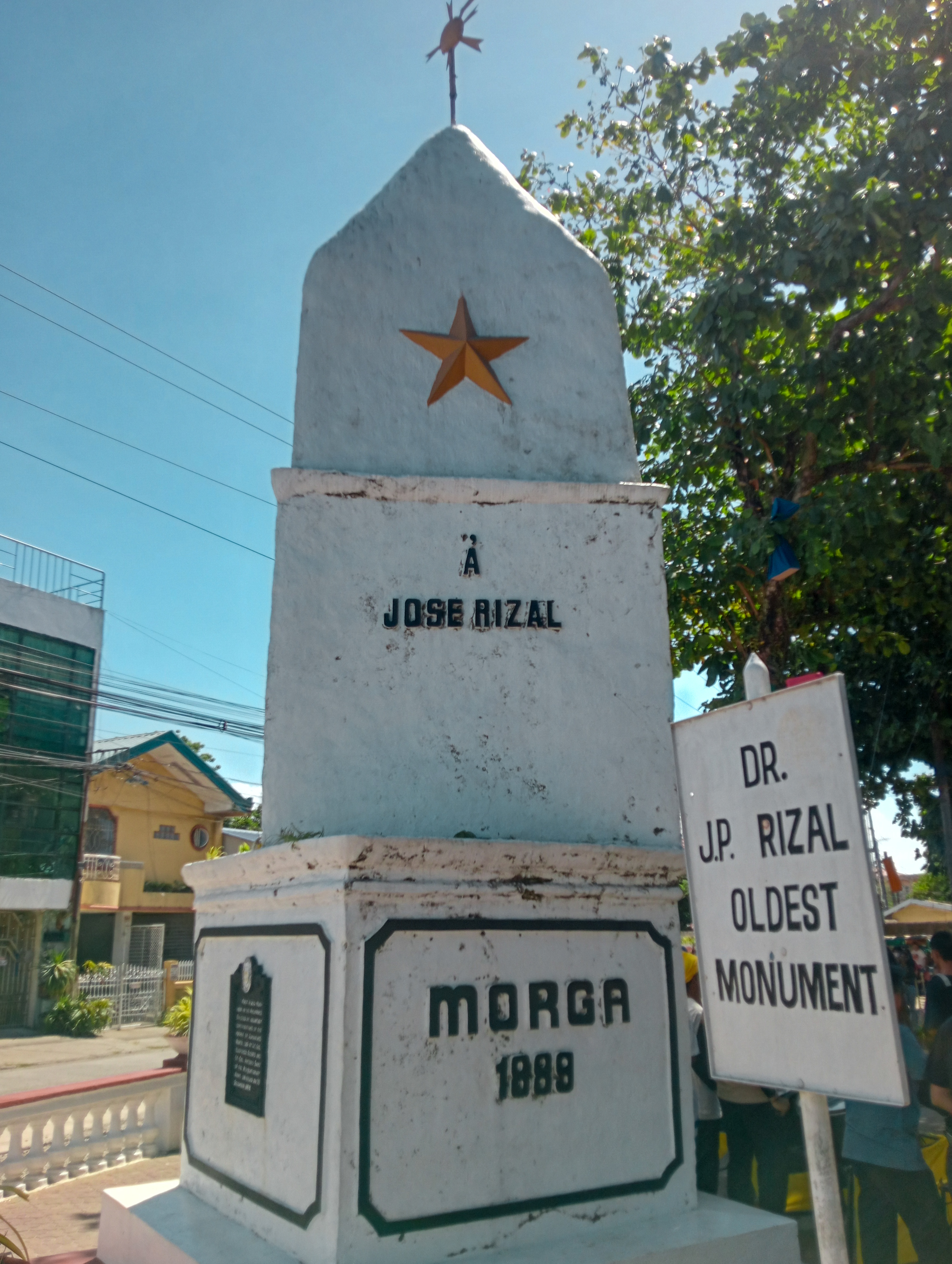
- The first monument in honor of Jose Rizal
- Interactive map of First José Rizal Monument
- Location: Rizal Park, Justo Lukban cor. J.P. Rizal Streets, Daet, Camarines Norte
- Coordinates: 14°06′47″N 122°57′16″E
- Designer: Lt. Colonel Antonio Sanz and Ildefonso Alegre
- Type: Monument
- Completion date: February 1899
- Dedicated to: José Rizal

National Historical Landmarks
- Official name: First Rizal Monument
- Type: Monument, structure
- Designated: July 9, 2008; 18 years ago
- Legal basis: Resolution No. 12, s. 2008
- Region: Bicol
- Marker date: 1961; 65 years ago

The Rizal Monument in Daet, Camarines Norte was the first monument built to honor José Rizal, and is the oldest surviving such monument in the Philippines. It was designed by Lt. Colonel Antonio Sanz with the help of Ildefonso Alegre of the Philippine Revolutionary Army and through the financial contributions of the locals of Camarines Norte. The three-tiered stone pylon with its square base supporting a triangle in two stages was the first monument and memorial marker in memory of the Philippines' National Hero.

== History ==
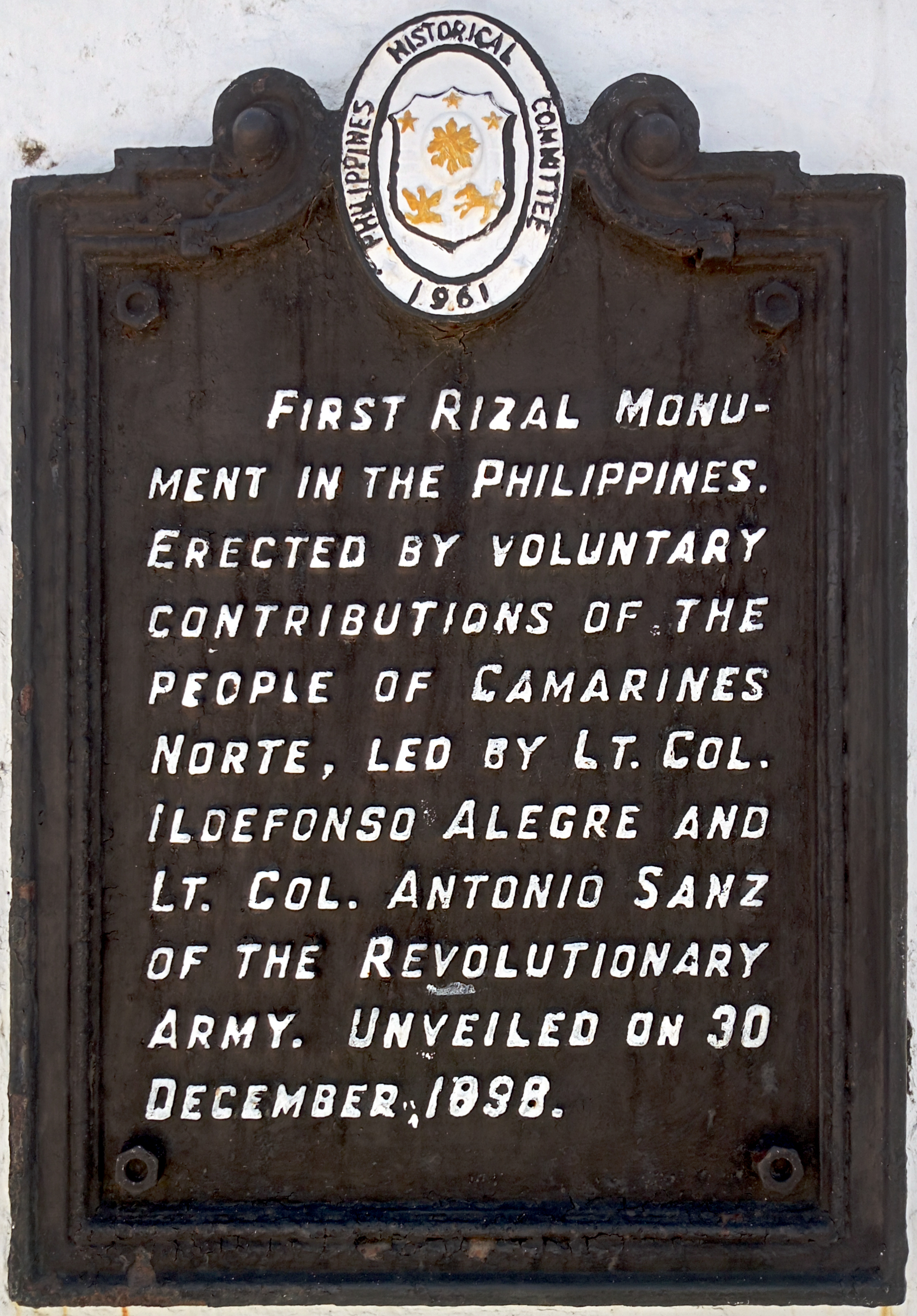
Historical marker installed in 1961 at the base of the monument

The construction of the memorial marker started on December 30, 1898, two years after the execution of José Rizal and in compliance with a decree of Gen. Emilio Aguinaldo to observe the said date as a national holiday in the "Free Philippines." The monument was completed in February 1899.

It was declared as a historical landmark in 1961 by the National Historical Commission and was declared a national monument on July 9, 2008, by virtue of Resolution No. 12 by the National Historical Institute (now the National Historical Commission of the Philippines).

== Parts of the memorial ==
Standing at about 20 feet (6.1 m), the three-tiered stone pylon has a cube for a base, a three-sided pyramid in the middle, and a triangular pyramid which tapers off to a point at the top. Pinned on top is an eight-ray sun and on each of the three sides (middle) is a bas-relief of a golden star. The famous "Three Stars and a Sun" was originally a symbol of the Katipuneros fighting for the independence of the country.

The phrase "A Jose Rizal" (To Jose Rizal) can be found on two of the sides of the middle tier (no inscription at the back).

The podium was inscribed with the titles and publication year of Rizal's novels: "Noli Me Tangere" (1887), "El Filibusterismo" (1891), and "Morga" (1889). The last is not really an original but an annotation of Antonio de Morga's "Sucesos de las Islas Filipinas" (1609), which he copied verbatim from the British Museum.
