= List of historical markers of the Philippines in Soccsksargen =

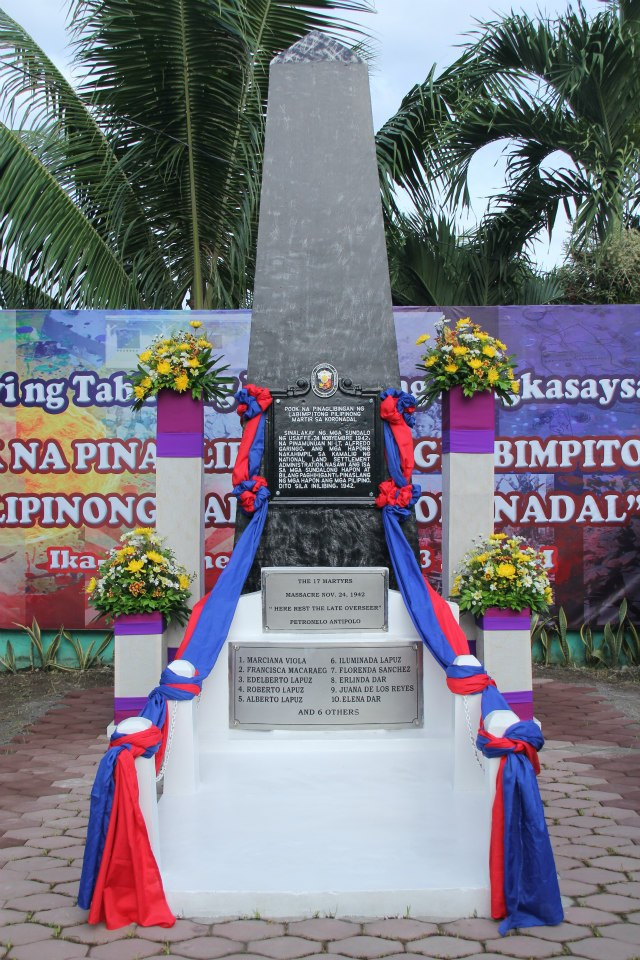
Monument of the Seventeen Martyrs of Koronadal in Koronadal, South Cotabato

This list of historical markers installed by the National Historical Commission of the Philippines (NHCP) in SOCCSKSARGEN (Region XII) is an annotated list of people, places, or events in the region that have been commemorated by cast-iron plaques issued by the said commission. The plaques themselves are permanent signs installed in publicly visible locations on buildings, monuments, or in special locations.

While many Cultural Properties have historical markers installed, not all places marked with historical markers are designated into one of the particular categories of Cultural Properties.

This article lists four markers from the SOCCSKSARGEN, including two that are part of the Quincentennial historical markers series.

== Cotabato ==
This are currently no markers from the province of Cotabato. A marker commemorating Fort Pikit, while geographically located in the province, is part of the Bangsamoro Autonomous Region in Muslim Mindanao (BARMM) as a Special Geographic Area.

== Sarangani ==
This table lists two markers from the province of Sarangani.

Marker title	Description	Location	Language	Date issued	Image
Batulaki; Ruta ng Ekspedisyong Magallanes–Elcano sa Pilipinas (Note: Batulaki: Route of the Magellan–Elcano expedition in the Philippines)	From Benaian, approximately Maasim, Magellan's fleet went here on October 26, 1521.	Brgy. Batulaki, Glan	Filipino	October 26, 2021	
Benaian; Ruta ng Ekspedisyong Magallanes–Elcano sa Pilipinas (Note: Benaian: Route of the Magellan–Elcano expedition in the Philippines)		Kamanga, Maasim	Filipino	October 25, 2021	

== South Cotabato ==
This table lists two markers from the province of South Cotabato, including the independent city of General Santos.

Marker title	Description	Location	Language	Date issued	Image
Hen. Paulino Santos (1880–1945) (Note: Gen. Paulino Santos (1880–1945))	Became the first commander of the Armed Forces of the Philippines.	Plaza Heneral Santos, General Santos	Filipino	September 9, 1981	
Pook na Pinaglibingan ng Labimpitong Pilipinong Martir sa Koronadal (Note: Burial site of the Seventeen Filipino Martyrs of Koronadal)	Burial site of martyrs killed by the Japanese because of a USAFFE forces attacked Japanese forces on November 24, 1942.	Koronadal Central I Elementary School, Rizal St. cor. Rafael R. Alunan Sr. Ave., Koronadal	Filipino	January 4, 2013	

== Sultan Kudarat ==
There are no markers from the province of Sultan Kudarat.

== See also ==
- List of Cultural Properties of the Philippines in Soccsksargen

== Bibliography ==
- National Historical Institute (1994). Historical Markers: Regions V-XIII. National Historical Institute.
- National Historical Institute (2008). Historical Markers (1992 - 2006). National Historical Institute.
- A list of sites and structures with historical markers, as of 16 January 2012
- A list of institutions with historical markers, as of 16 January 2012
