= Historical markers of the Philippines =

Commemorative plaques in the Philippines

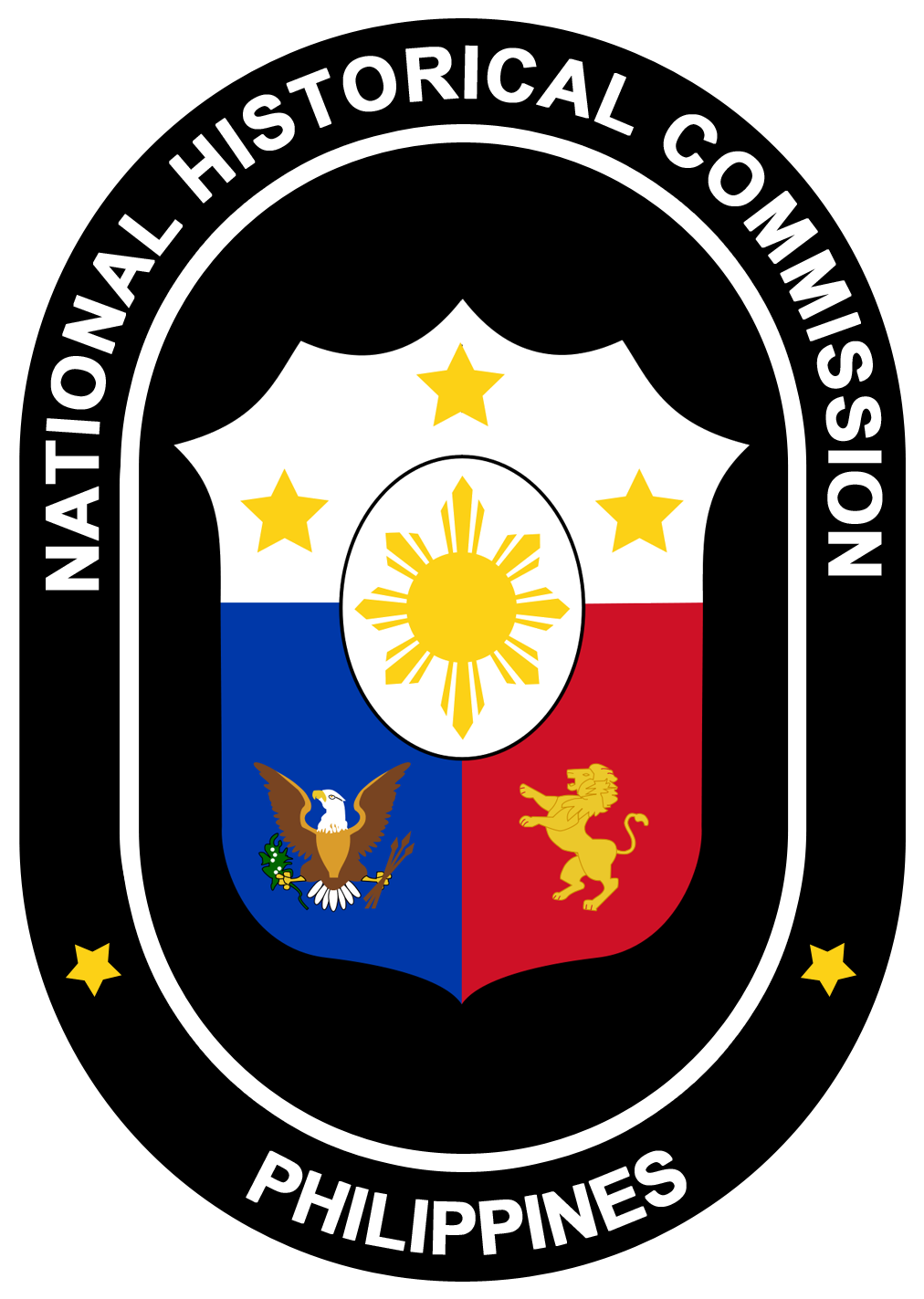
Current seal design on top of markers

Historical markers of the Philippines (Filipino: Panandang pangkasaysayan ng Pilipinas; Spanish: Marcador histórico de Filipinas or Placa histórica de Filipinas) are commemorative plaques installed in the Philippines and overseas by the National Historical Commission of the Philippines (NHCP) and its predecessor agencies to commemorate significant and historic events, persons, sites, structures, and institutions.

The markers are installed in publicly visible locations such as on buildings, monuments, and other notable sites, and are intended to be permanent. The NHCP also allows local municipalities and cities to install markers honoring figures and events of local significance, although these markers are prohibited from using the seal of the Republic of the Philippines.

"Level II" markers in the NHCP classification system are installed at sites or structures that possess historical significance but which have not been formally declared higher-tier national treasures or landmarks ("Level I"), and as of December 2023 the total number of Level II historical markers included in the NHCP's registry was 1,381. However, the number of markers from all lists and levels at that time exceeded 1,820, including those that were decommissioned, lost, destroyed, of unknown location, or bore the official seal but were not listed on known official records. Such inadequacies in listing and mapping from the NHCP itself have led to private initiatives to document historical markers.

== History ==
Colonial era markers and memorials

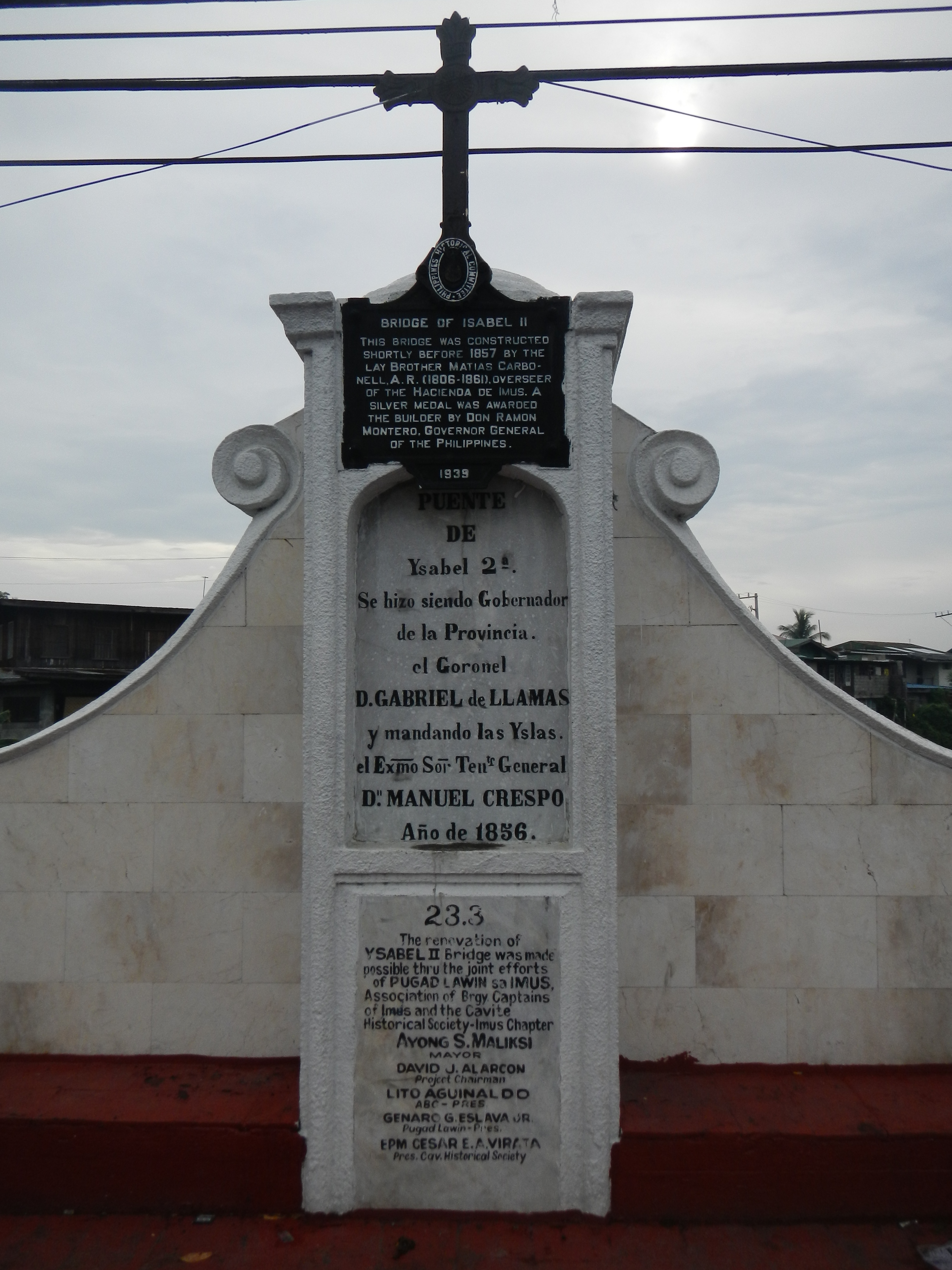
Spanish-era memorial on the Bridge of Isabel II (1856). A PHRMC marker was added in 1939 and another plaque was added during the term of Mayor Ayong Maliksi (1988–1998).

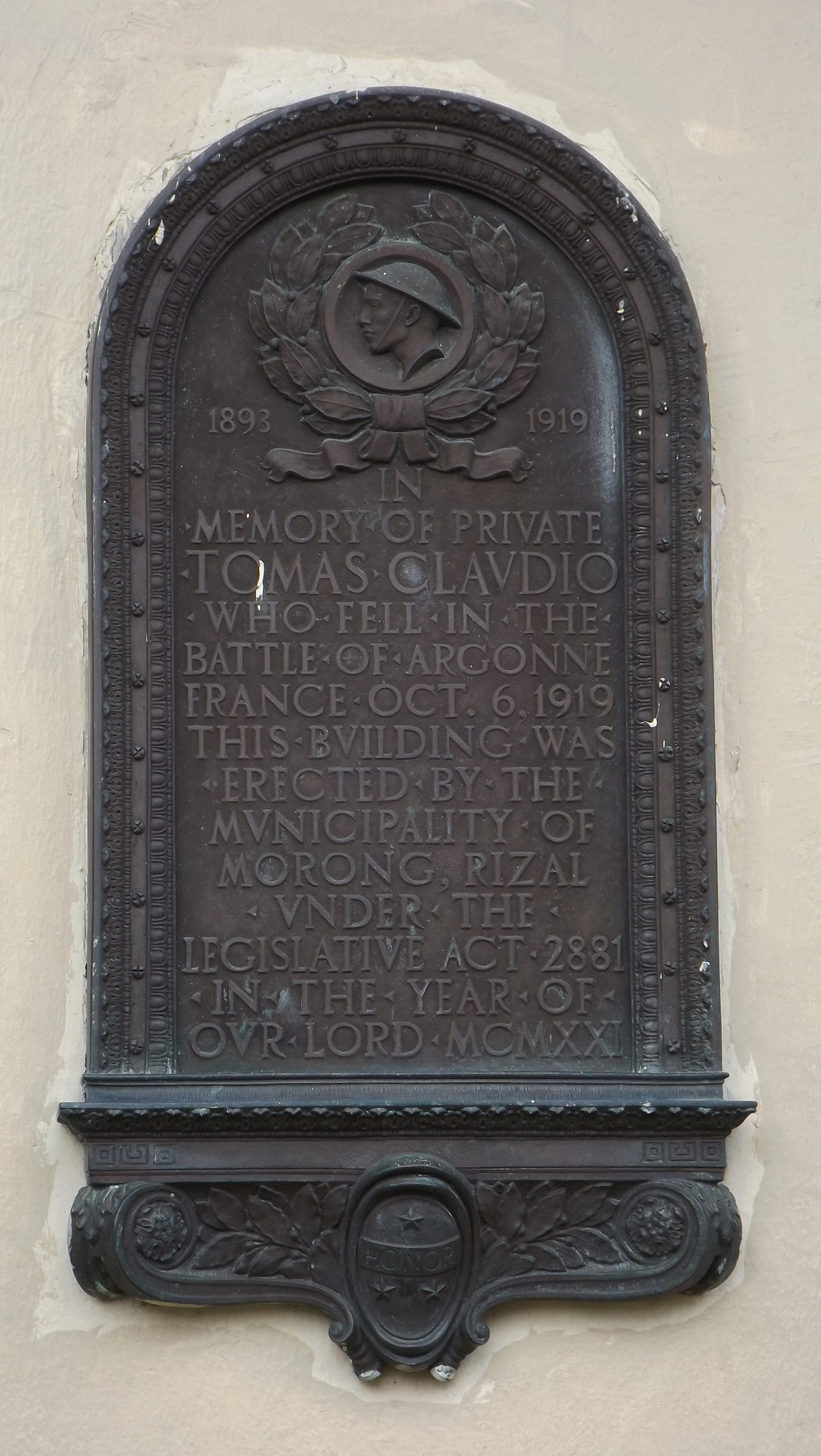
American-era plaque for Filipino WWI soldier Tomas Claudio at Tomas Claudio Memorial Elementary School (1921).

Monuments and plaques marking relevant personages and events were installed under the Spanish colonial government, such as the dedication monument to Ferdinand Magellan erected in 1866. During the American colonial era several efforts to create monuments and mark historic sites and events were initiated, such as the Cry of Balintawak, the José Rizal Monument, and the birthplace of Andrés Bonifacio. However, many more historical sites from that era are yet to be recognized or marked.

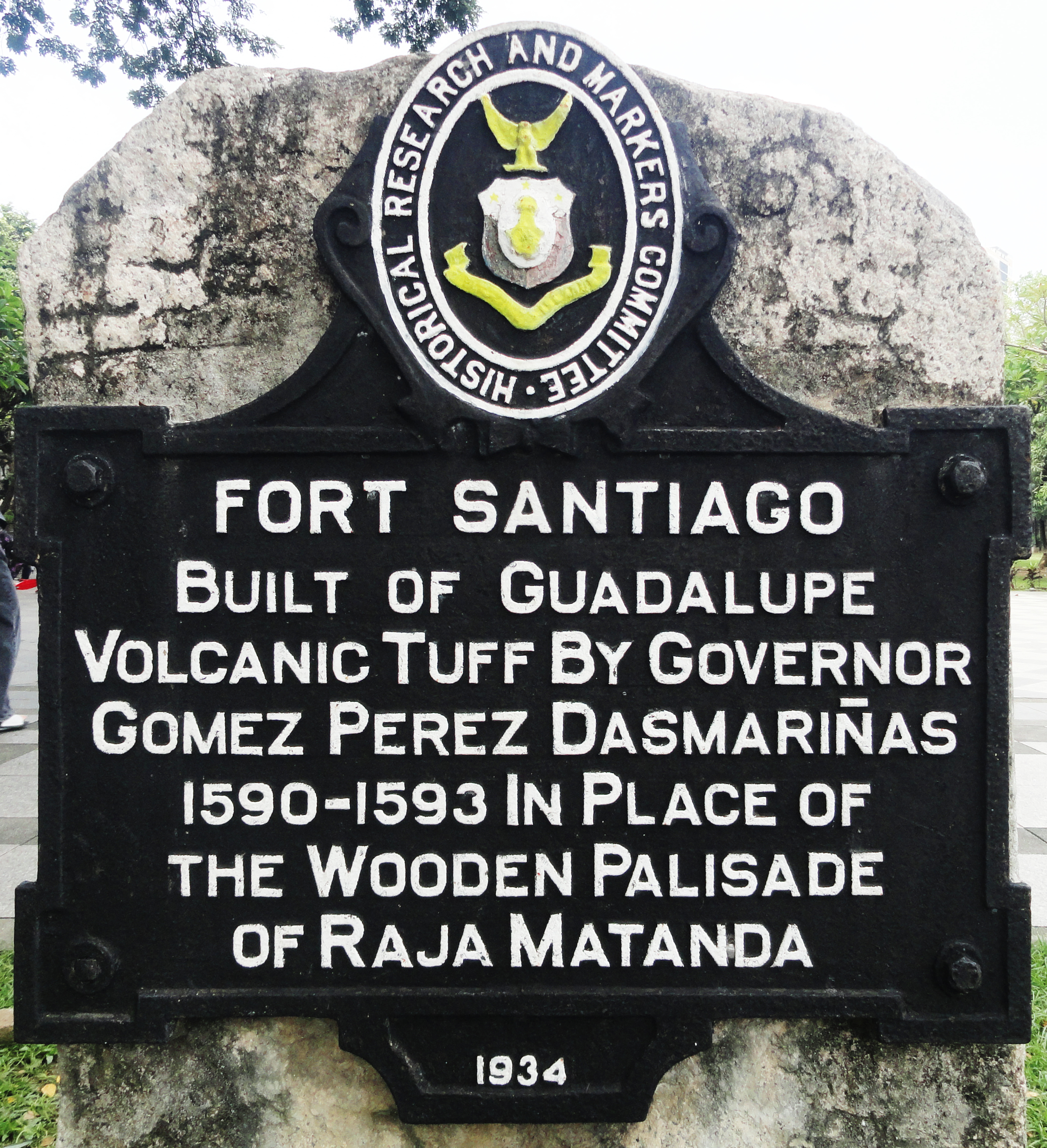
One of the first PHRMC markers was installed in 1934 at Fort Santiago, Manila.

The Philippine Historical Research and Markers Committee (PHRMC) was established on October 23, 1933 in the American colonial era via Public Act 451 during the governorship of Frank Murphy, and was the earliest predecessor of the NHCP. Its first committee was composed of eight members: Walter Robb as chairman; Richard Ely as secretary; and Miguel Selga, Conrado Benitez, Edward Hyde, H. Otley Beyer, Jaime C. de Veyra, and Eulogio Rodriguez as members. Its original remit to mark cultural and historical antiquities in Manila was later expanded to cover the rest of the Philippines.

The first PHRMC markers were installed in 1934, including ones for the Church of San Agustin, Fort Santiago, Plaza McKinley, Roman Catholic Cathedral of Manila, San Sebastian Church, Concordia College, Manila Railroad Company, Dr. Lorenzo Negrao, Church of Nuestra Señora de Guia, and University of Santo Tomas (Intramuros site). These markers bore the name of the committee, the coat of arms of the Commonwealth Government, a historical narrative written in English, and the year of the marker's installation.

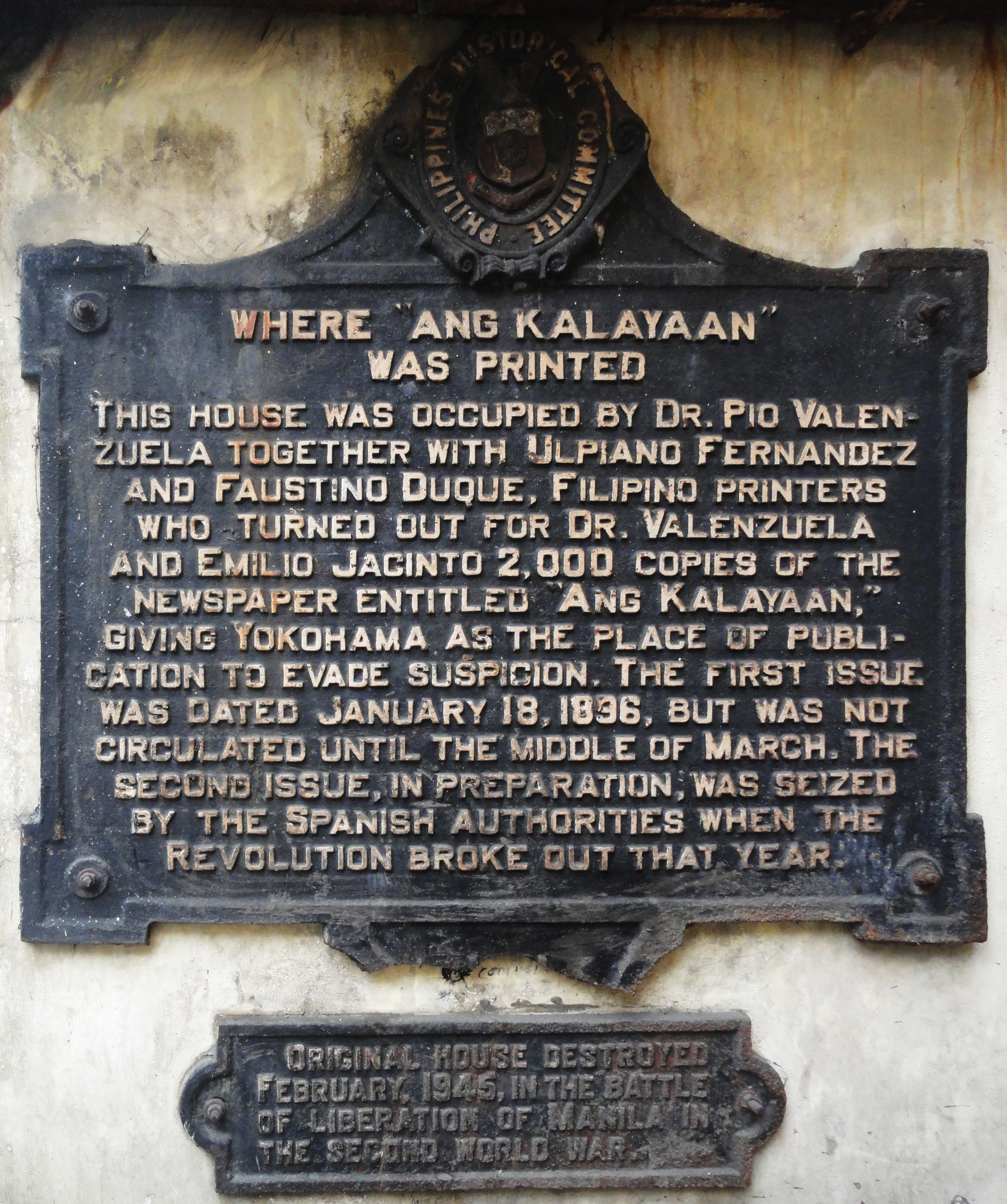
This marker commemorating the revolutionary publication of the Katipunan in San Nicolas, Manila was damaged when its original site was destroyed during World War II.

The installation of markers generally stopped during World War II with the exception of one for Ang Unang Limbagan sa Pilipinas (The First Publishing House in the Philippines), which is dated 1943 and was the first marker in Tagalog language. Some of the pre-war markers were either lost or destroyed during the war, and over the years other markers have gone missing, reportedly stolen and sold as scrap metal. For example, new markers had to be installed as replacements for missing ones at San Agustin Church and Manila Cathedral.

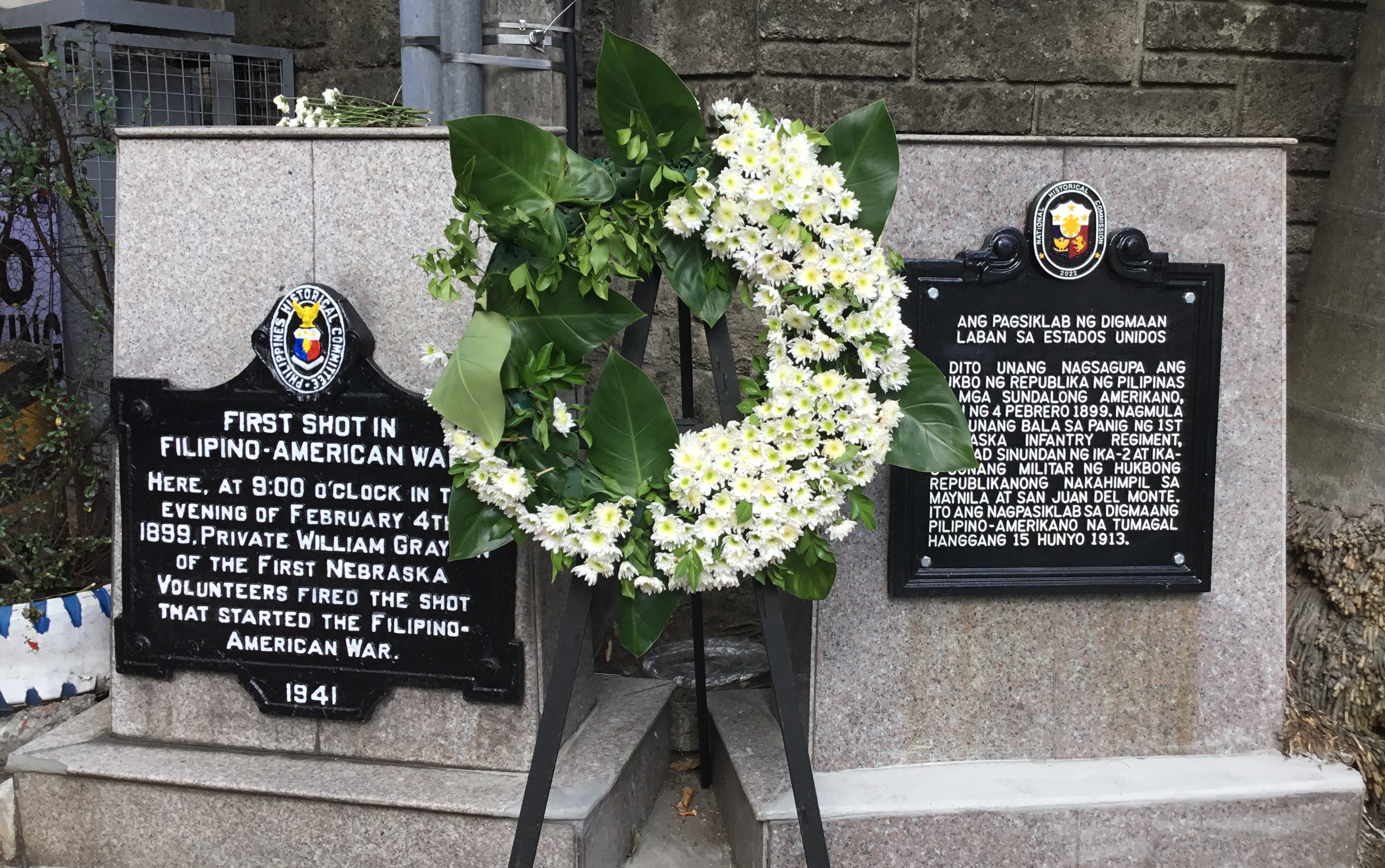
Markers installed by the PHRMC in 1941 (left), and by the NHCP in 2022, both commemorating the first shot of the Philippine–American War. A 2023 study done by Ronnie Miravite Casalmir proves that the correct location for these markers should be at the corner of Sociego Street and Arguelles Street, not at Sociego-Silencio where they are erroneously placed. Prof. Ambeth R. Ocampo finds the evidence presented by Ronnie Miravite Casalmir as new and compelling, and does show that the markers should be transferred to Sociego-Arguelles.

Since then the installation of markers has been continued by the successors of the PHRMC: the Philippines Historical Committee (PHC), the National Historical Institute (NHI), and the National Historical Commission of the Philippines (NHCP), with the NHCP overseeing the installation of some landmark markers in the 21st century. Citing the concentration of markers in Luzon, the NHCP stated in 2011 that it will pursue more markers for Visayas and Mindanao so as to further their inclusion in national history. On March 3, 2014 the NHCP granted a national historical landmark marker to The Kudan, the Philippine embassy building in Tokyo, the first overseas site to be granted such status. During the unveiling of the marker, Ambassador Manuel Lopez called the building "the crown jewel of Philippine foreign service". On June 3, 2016 the NHCP installed a marker for a nameless personality for the first time. Located in Macabebe, it commemorated Tarik Sulayman, the leader of the Battle of Bangkusay Channel, as the "first native to give up his life for independence". And on July 3, 2025 the Bangsamoro Autonomous Region in Muslim Mindanao (BARMM), in coordination with the NHCP through its Bangsamoro Commission for the Preservation of Cultural Heritage (BCPCH), unveiled its first historical marker at Camp Abubakar, Barira, Maguindanao del Norte, commemorating the former home of Sheikh Salamat Hashim, the former chairperson of the Moro Islamic Liberation Front.

The NHCP and various volunteers have conducted restoration activities of markers in display or in storage, involving technicians, engineers, conservators, teachers, property owners, and enthusiasts. Some groups have aimed to restore vandalized markers.

== Criteria and policies ==
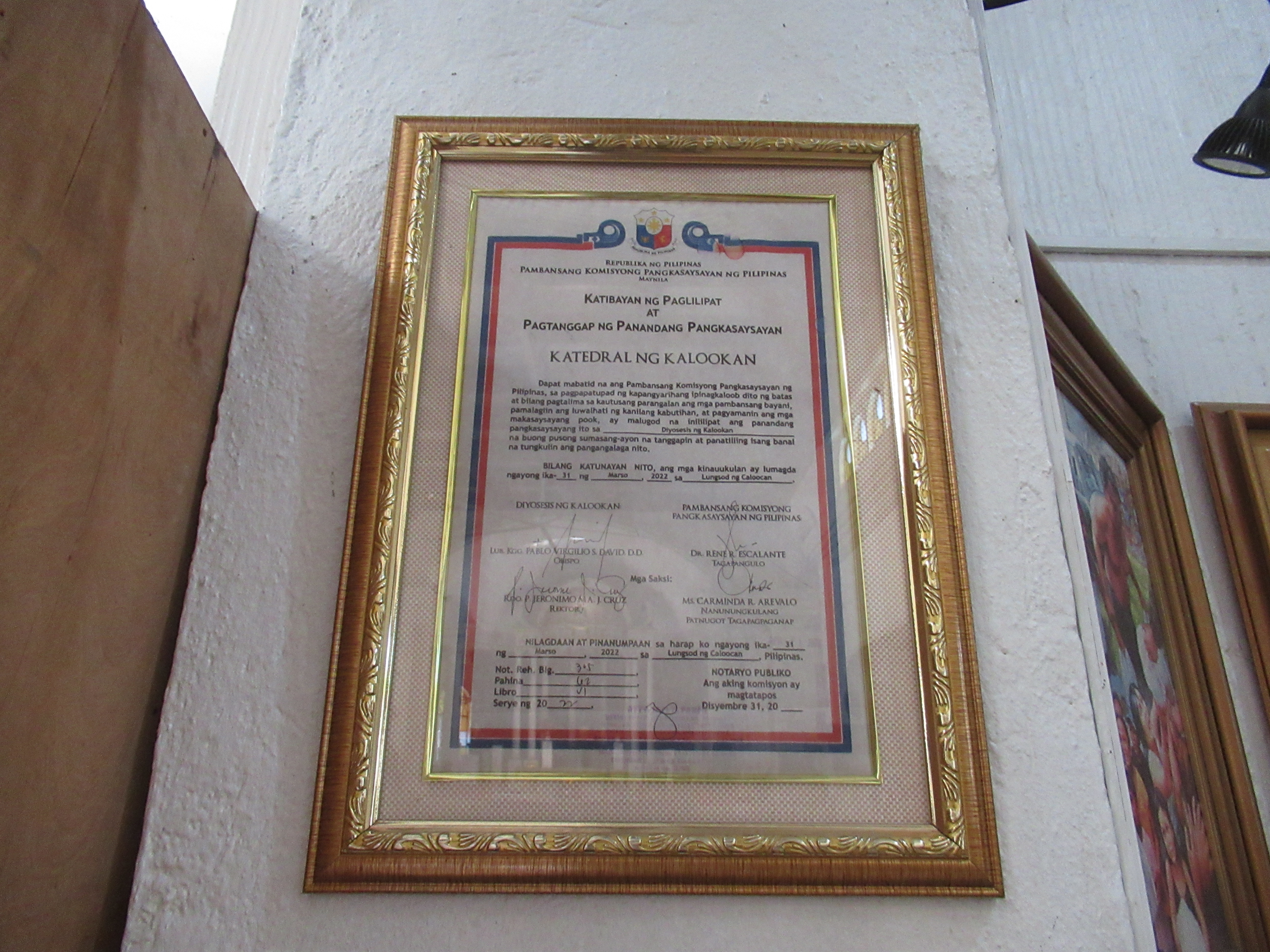
A certificate of transfer and acceptance for a marker

The NHCP has issued and operates according to the following criteria and policies on the installation of markers.

1. Markers shall be installed for Filipino heroes, historic events and places involving historical acts and patriotic endeavors to dramatize the need to focus to the national consciousness the history of our country from the Filipino viewpoint and to evoke pride in our national heritage and identity.
2. Installation of historical markers that honor Filipino heroes shall be undertaken after proper and thorough study.
3. Historical markers shall only be installed in places with great historical value as determined by the NHI Board.
4. Historical markers for religious personalities may be installed in recognition of social or historical value.
5. Historical markers shall not be installed to honor persons deceased less than fifty years, unless they are considered outstanding figures.
6. Requests for historical markers may be granted during the centenary year of deserving persons, places, or structures.
7. Historical markers shall not be installed in honor of persons who are still living.
8. Historical markers may be installed in honor of foreigners, only in exceptional cases.
9. Markers of local significance shall be allowed upon approved application to the NHI provided they are installed and financed by the agency, person, or organization making the request and in such cases, the seal of the Republic of the Philippines shall not be allowed to be used.
10. In consonance with the national policy, all texts of historical markers shall be in the National Language.
11. The historical marker shall have a uniform design, size, and materials. The NHI shall exercise the exclusive right (patent) over its use and production.
12. The historical markers are government property. Any act to destroy or remove the said markers without the written authority from the NHI Board shall be charged criminally in accordance with existing laws. The NHI shall conceptualize the standard design, size, and materials of the pedestals for the historical marker.
13. To ensure the protection, upkeep, and maintenance of the historical markers, the NHI and the client (i.e. local executives, descendant of the hero, etc.) shall both officially agree and sign the Certificate of Transfer.

== Changing styles ==
The standard style of markers has changed in a number of ways over the years. In 1946, following the end of World War II, the language of the markers reverted to English, with a new rectangular portrait-formatted design featuring the coat of arms of the Third Philippine Republic as well as the year of installation. Markers from 1955 have different colored bolts and an accented border. Markers from 1963 feature italicized texts, while markers from 1966 bear the name of the new agency responsible for them, the NHC, with markers bearing the name of the NHI starting in 1974. During the 1970s the use of Tagalog became more consistent, with the markers having a plain design and the coat of arms contained entirely within the body of the plaque.

By 1977 the markers had gone back to their previous shape, although using a thinner metal instead of cast iron. Some 1980 markers have the coat of arms incorporated into the body of the plaque, and 1981 markers use a similar style from the early 1970s. From 1982 markers for artists have had an oval shape with an ornate border, similar to an egg-and-dart motif. Since 1983 marker design has been similar to other post-war forms, with changes on the coats of arms following changes in governments. By the 1990s the markers had shorter texts with unique designs.

Design changes over the years

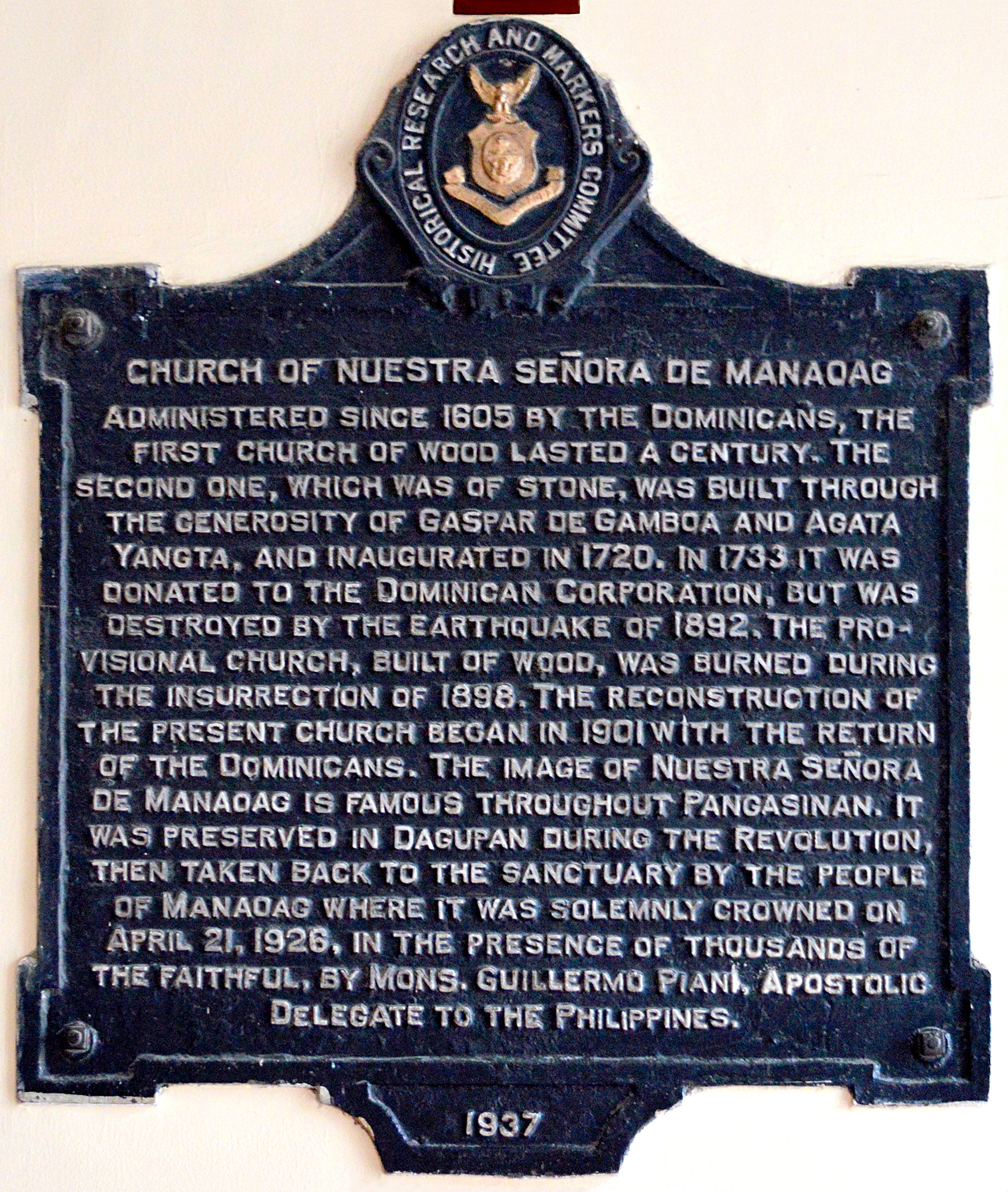

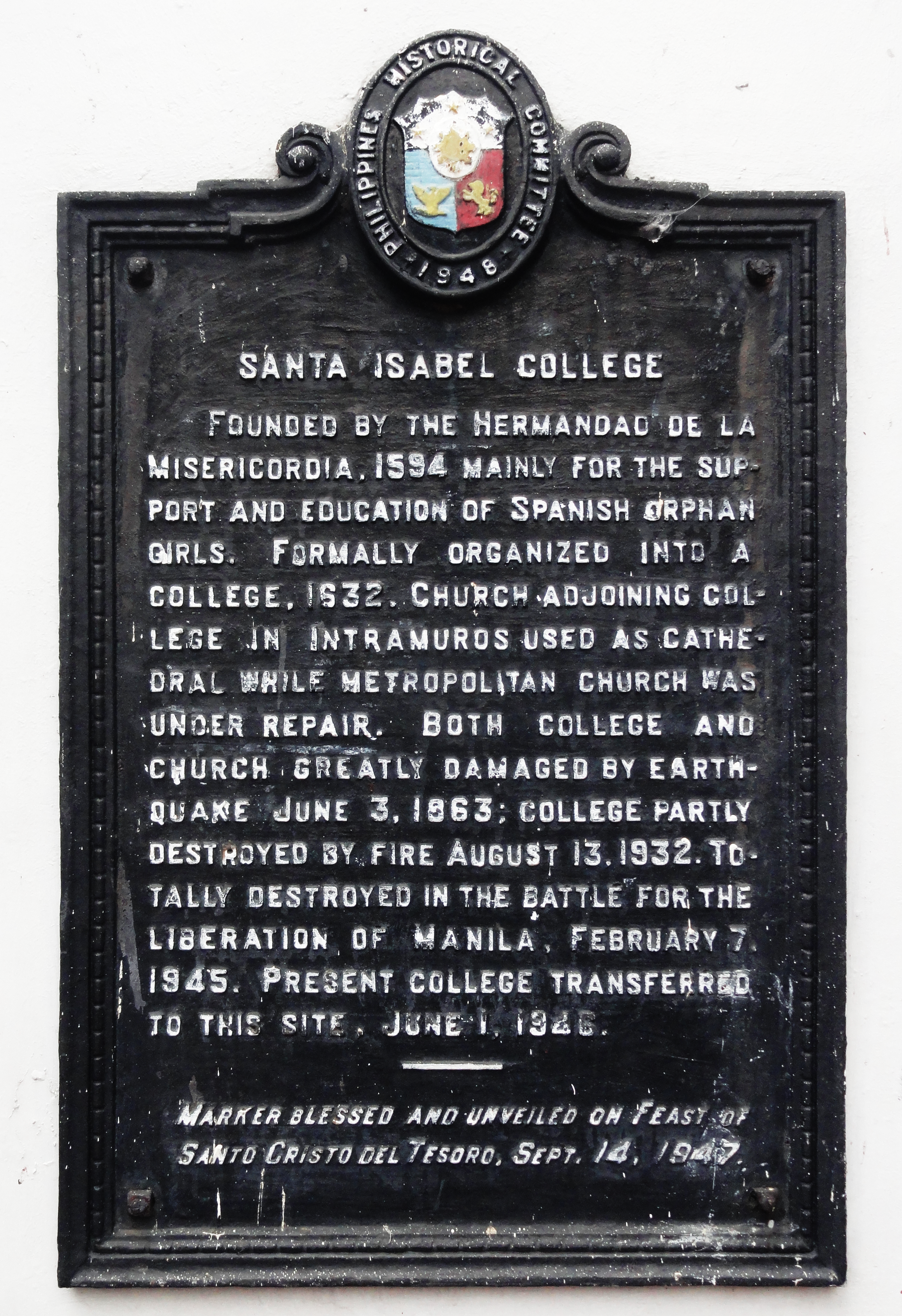

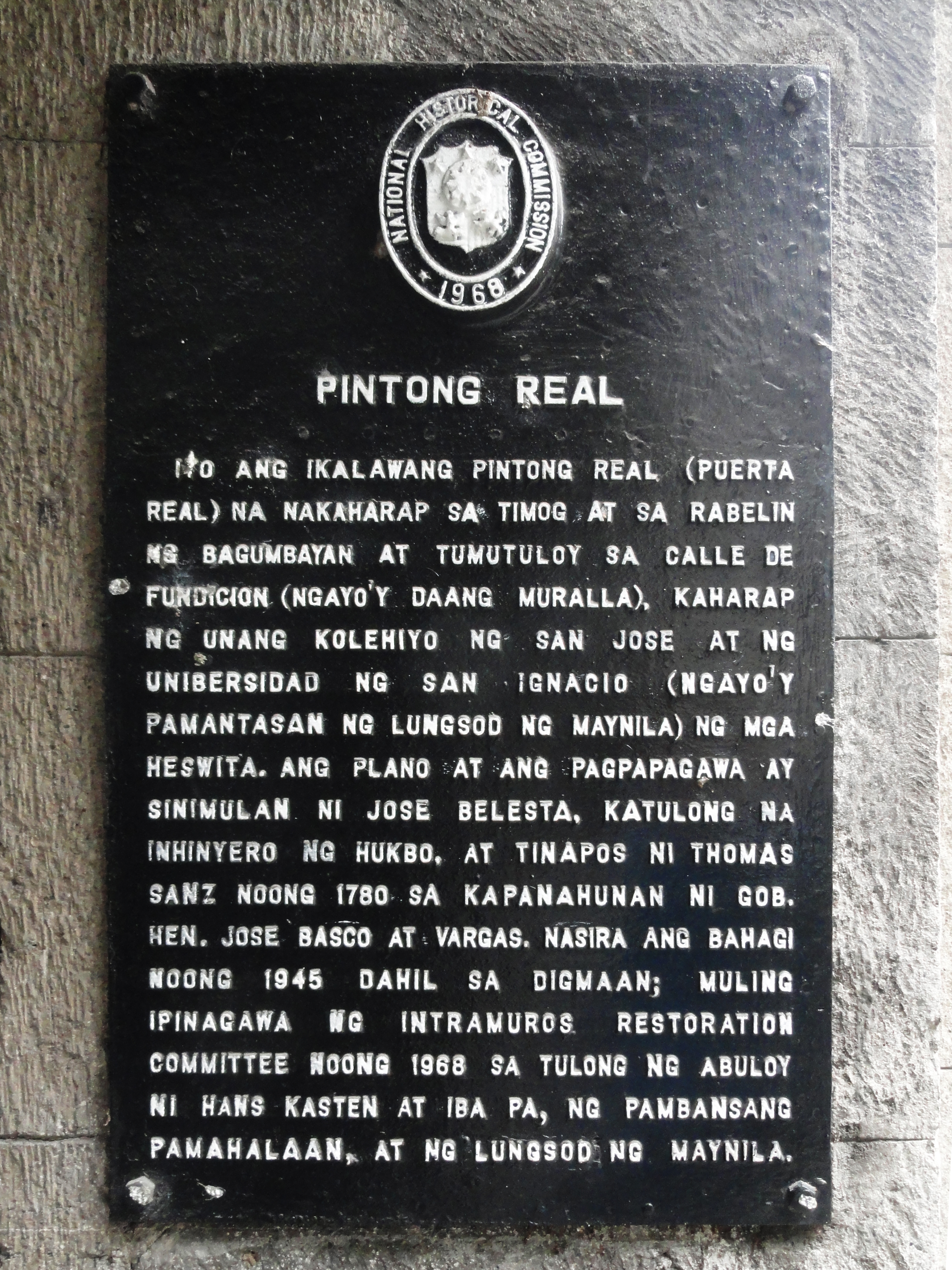

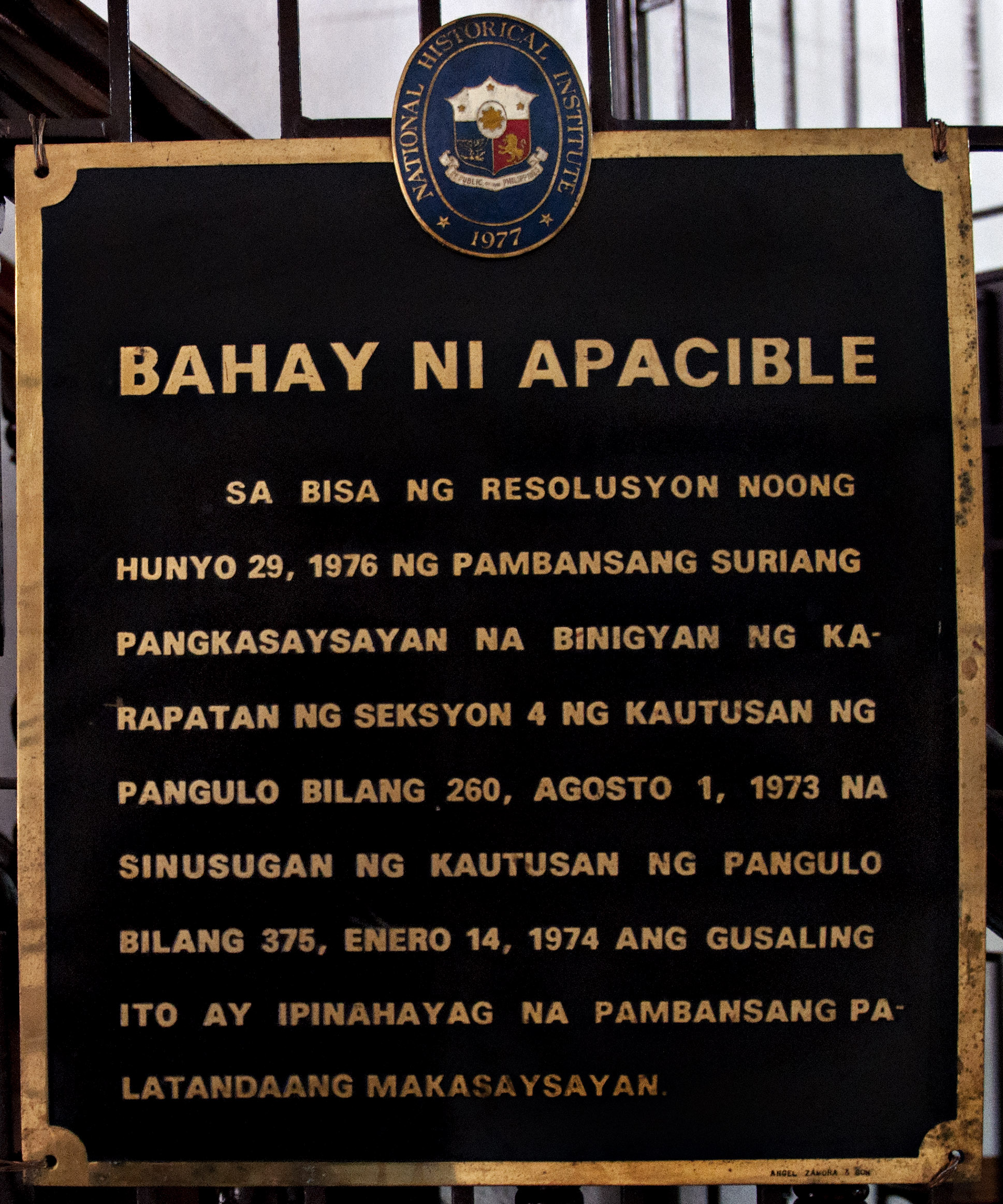

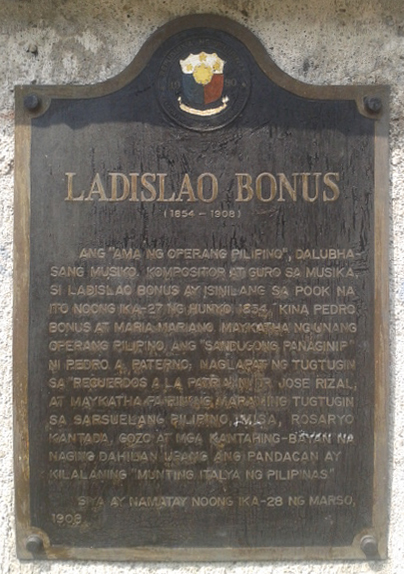

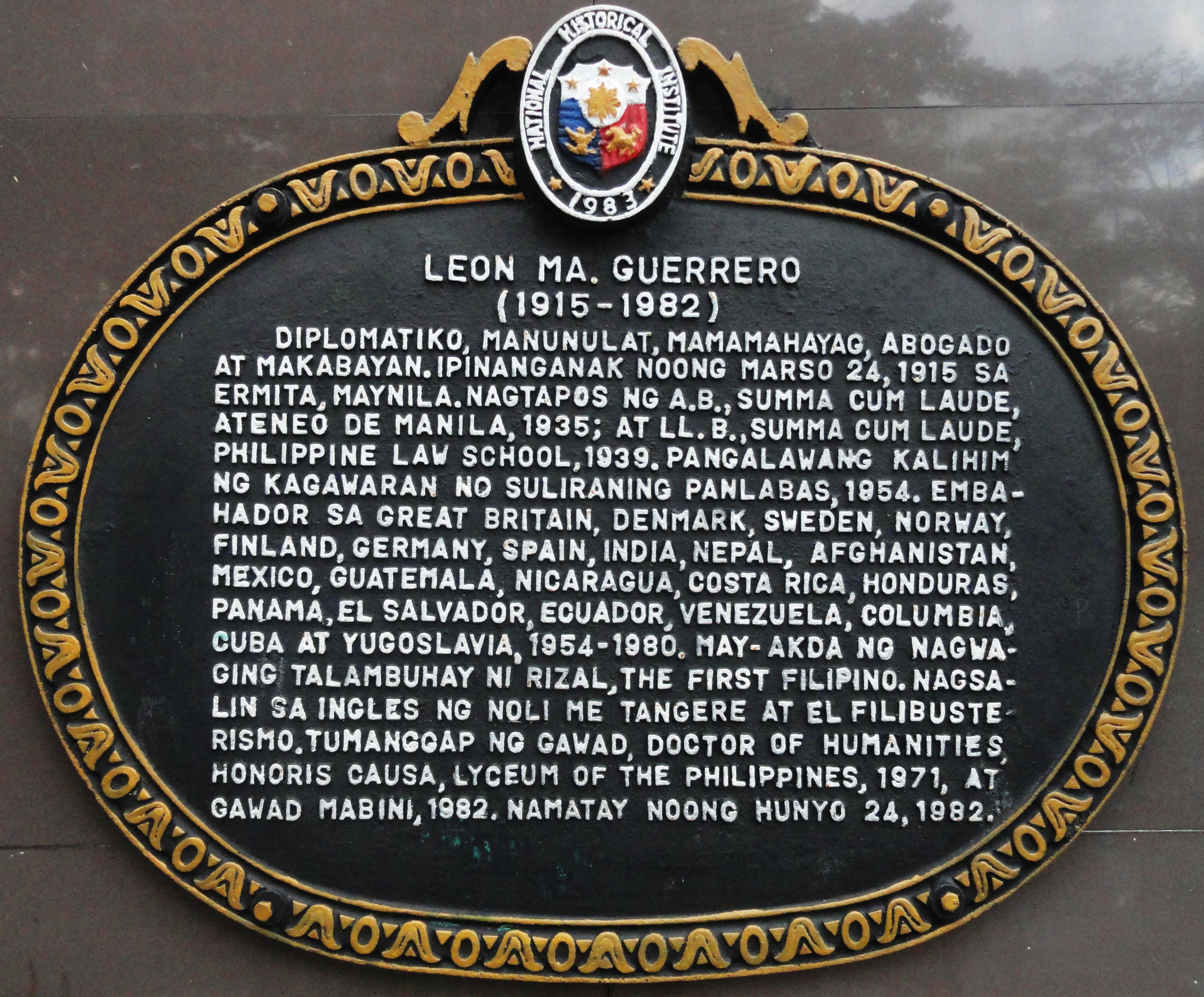

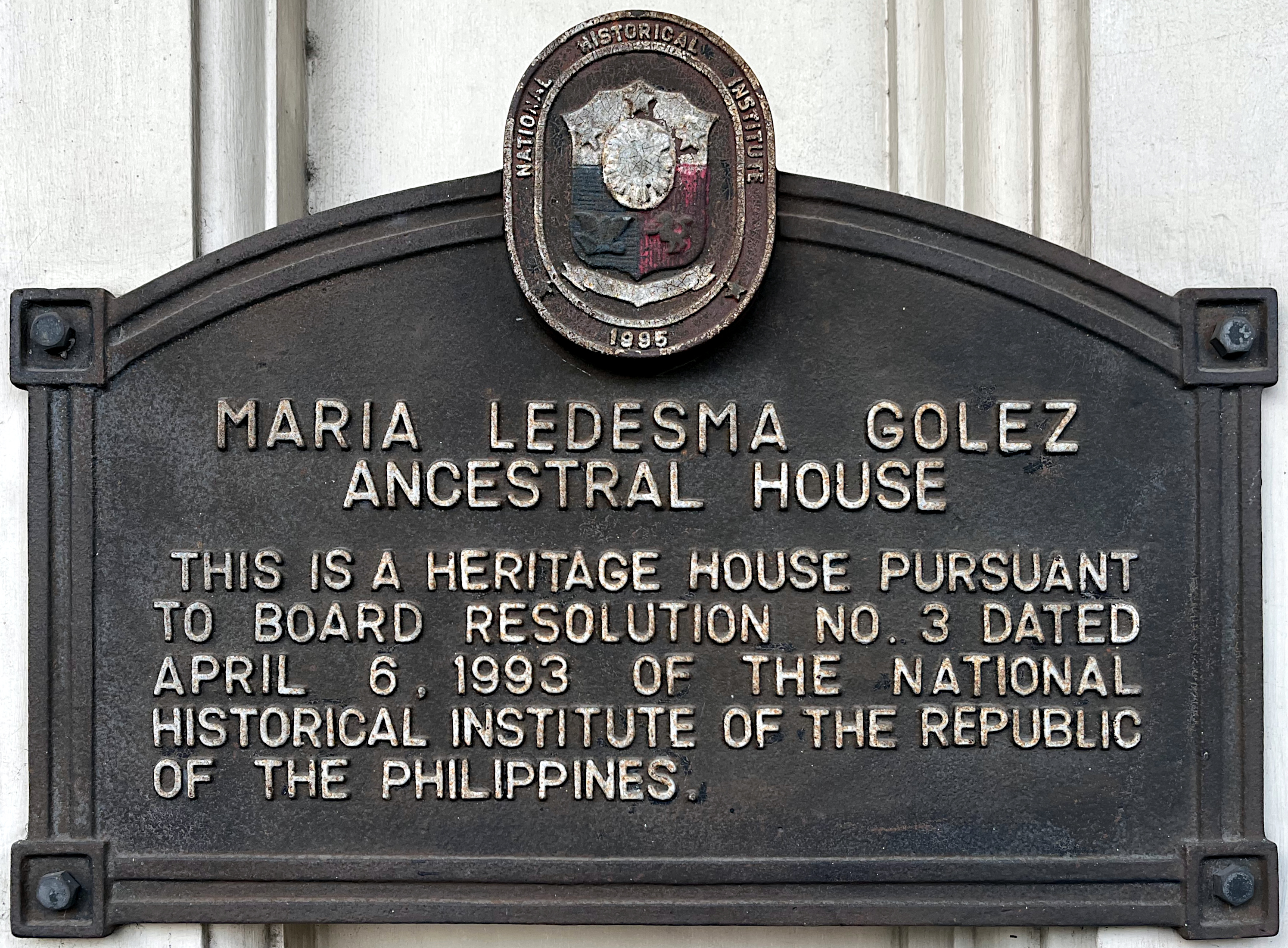

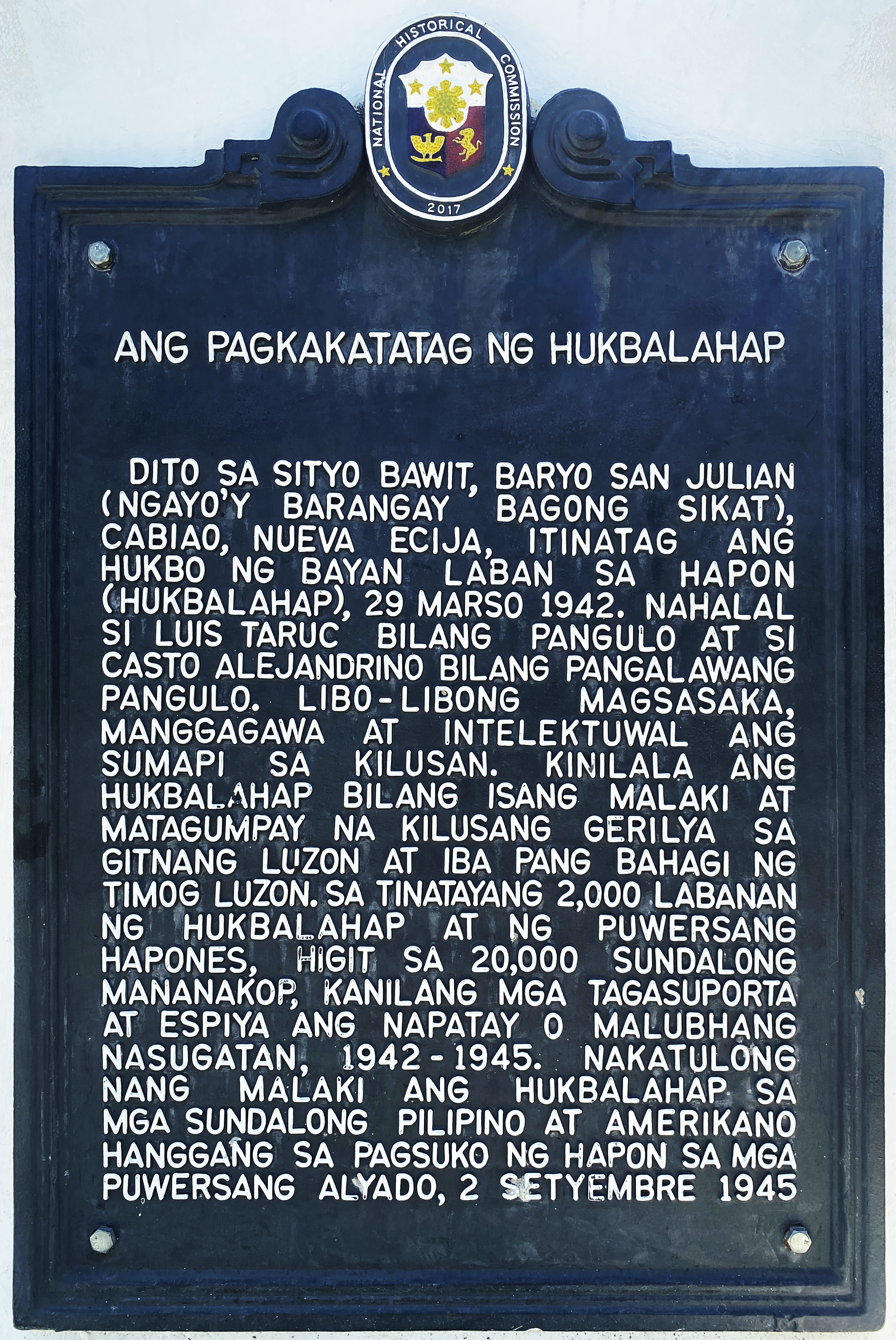

The language of contemporary markers is mostly Filipino, with some markers also featuring English, Spanish, and regional languages as some Filipinos have refused to read markers if the language on them is not a local one. The first two markers to contain a regional language were installed in 2008, written in both Cebuano and Filipino to commemorate the Cebu Provincial Capitol in Cebu City. The first marker in Ilocano was installed in 2009 to commemorate Mansion House in Baguio, and the first marker in Kapampangan was installed in 2017 to commemorate the Holy Rosary Parish Church in Angeles. Two of the first markers outside of the Philippines were installed in 1959, one in Ghent, Belgium, commemorating the residence of José Rizal where El Filibusterismo was published, and the second in Dezhou, China, commemorating Paduka Batara, a King of Sulu who paid tribute to the Yongle Emperor and died there. Historical markers outside of the Philippines can also be written in the local language of the country, as with the markers commemorating José Rizal in German in Berlin, Germany and in French in Ghent, Belgium.

There are more markers relating to Rizal than for any other historical figure or item, and Filipino historian Teodoro A. Agoncillo revealed that during his time on the NHCP board from 1963 to 1985 the board's efforts were mostly devoted to approving, discussing, and rewriting the marker texts. The number of marker requests relating to Rizal led him to joke: "Aba! Pati ba naman eskinitang inihian ni Rizal ibig lagyan ng marker!" ("What, they even want us to mark obscure side streets where Rizal relieved himself!").

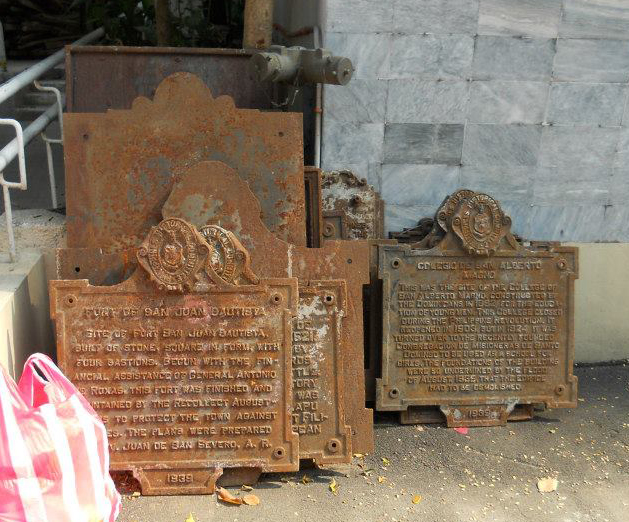
Markers in storage at the NHCP

The method of unveiling markers also changed after 2002, when during the unveiling ceremony of the marker for the National Federation of Women's Clubs in the Philippines in Manila Hotel, former president Fidel Ramos joked that the curtain raising reminded him of striptease, and everybody laughed. It was the last time the curtains were pulled upward, with unveiling always now involving the curtains being pulled sideways.

A number of markers have been decommissioned because they have been lost or stolen, because they are worn or have faded texts due to natural causes, or because have been replaced by an updated marker. The surviving decommissioned markers are held in storage at the NHCP, where they are displayed and restored, to perhaps be reinstalled in the future.

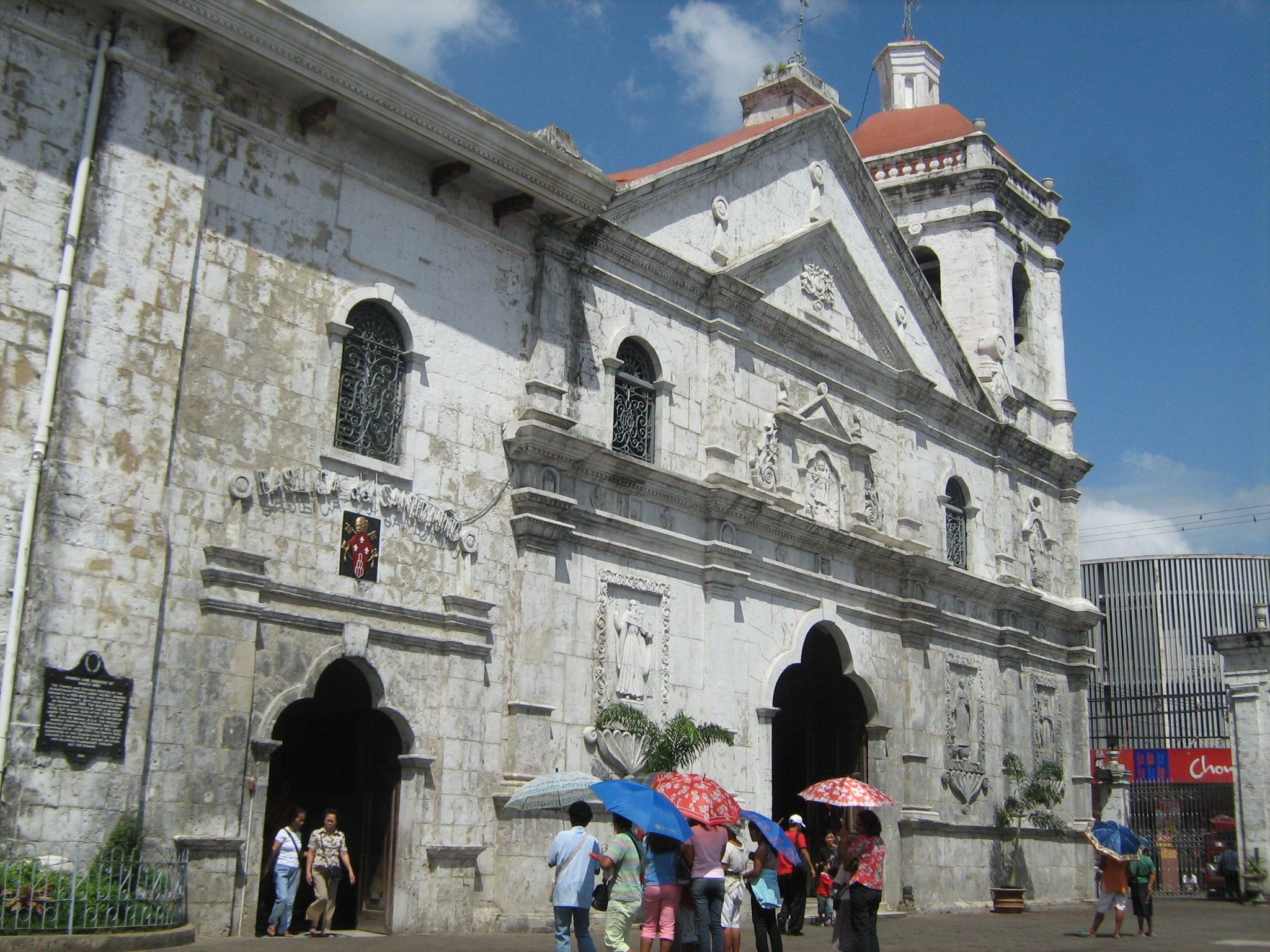
Marker on the façade of a structure

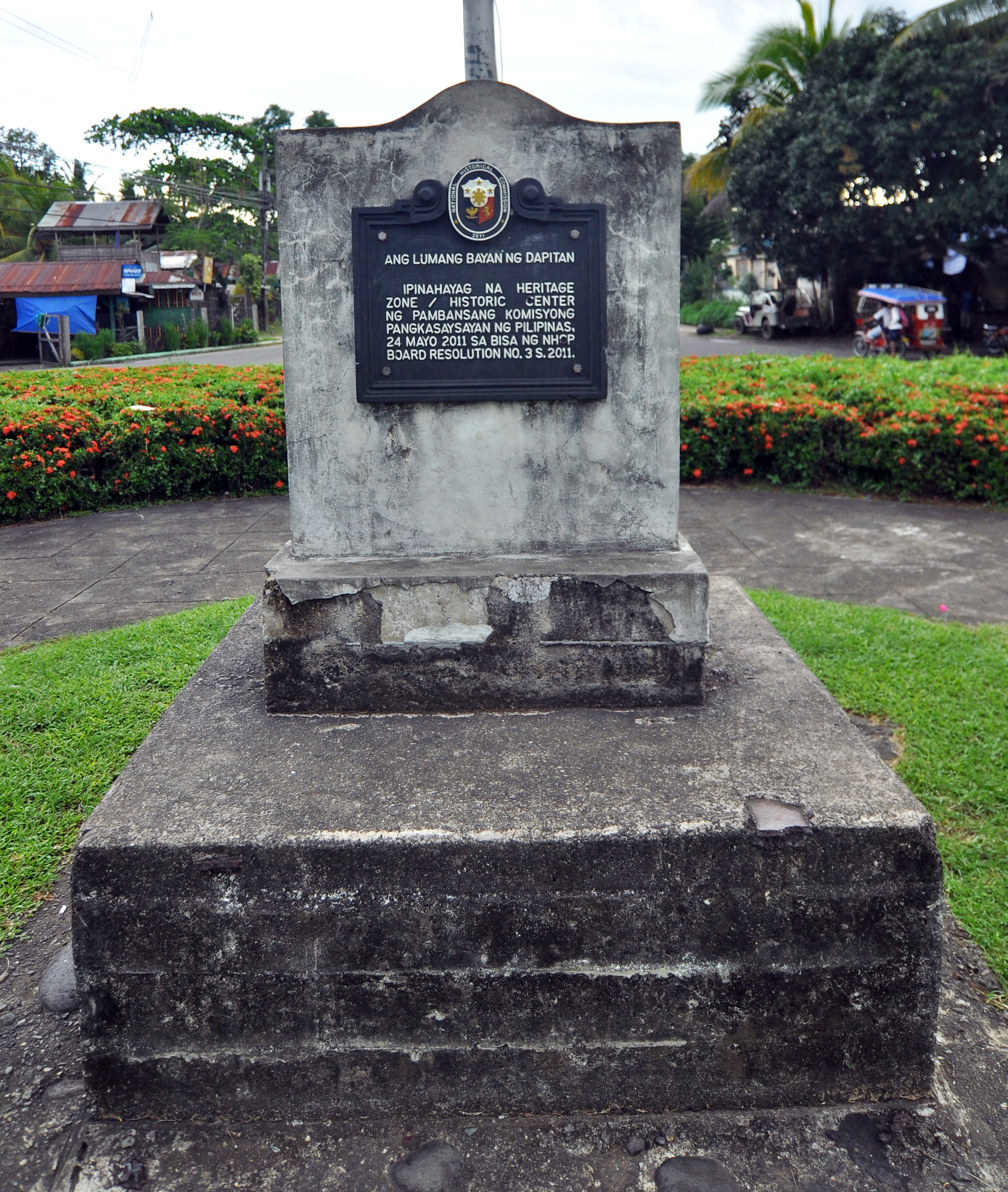
Marker on a stand-alone pedestal

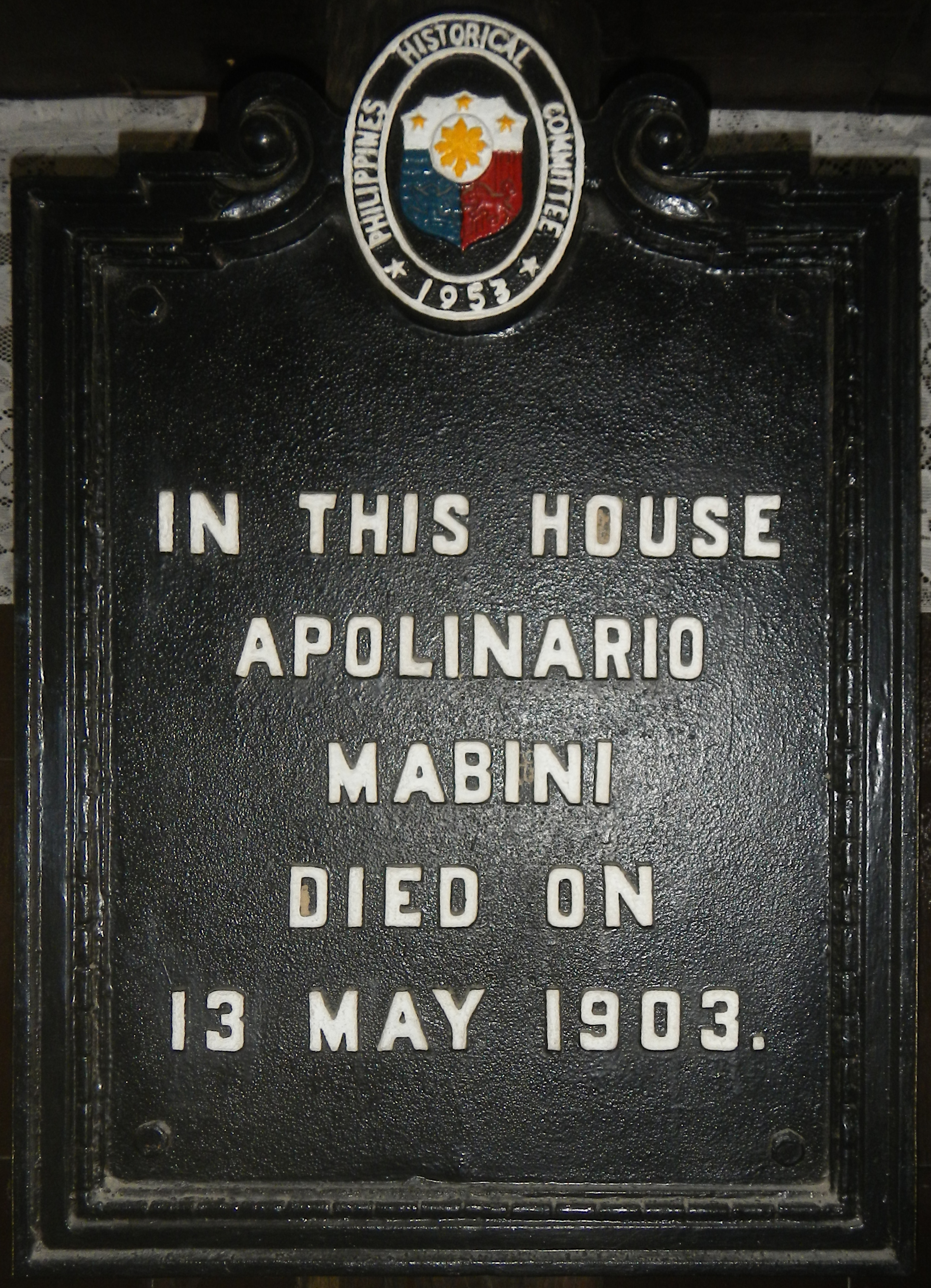
Marker inside a building

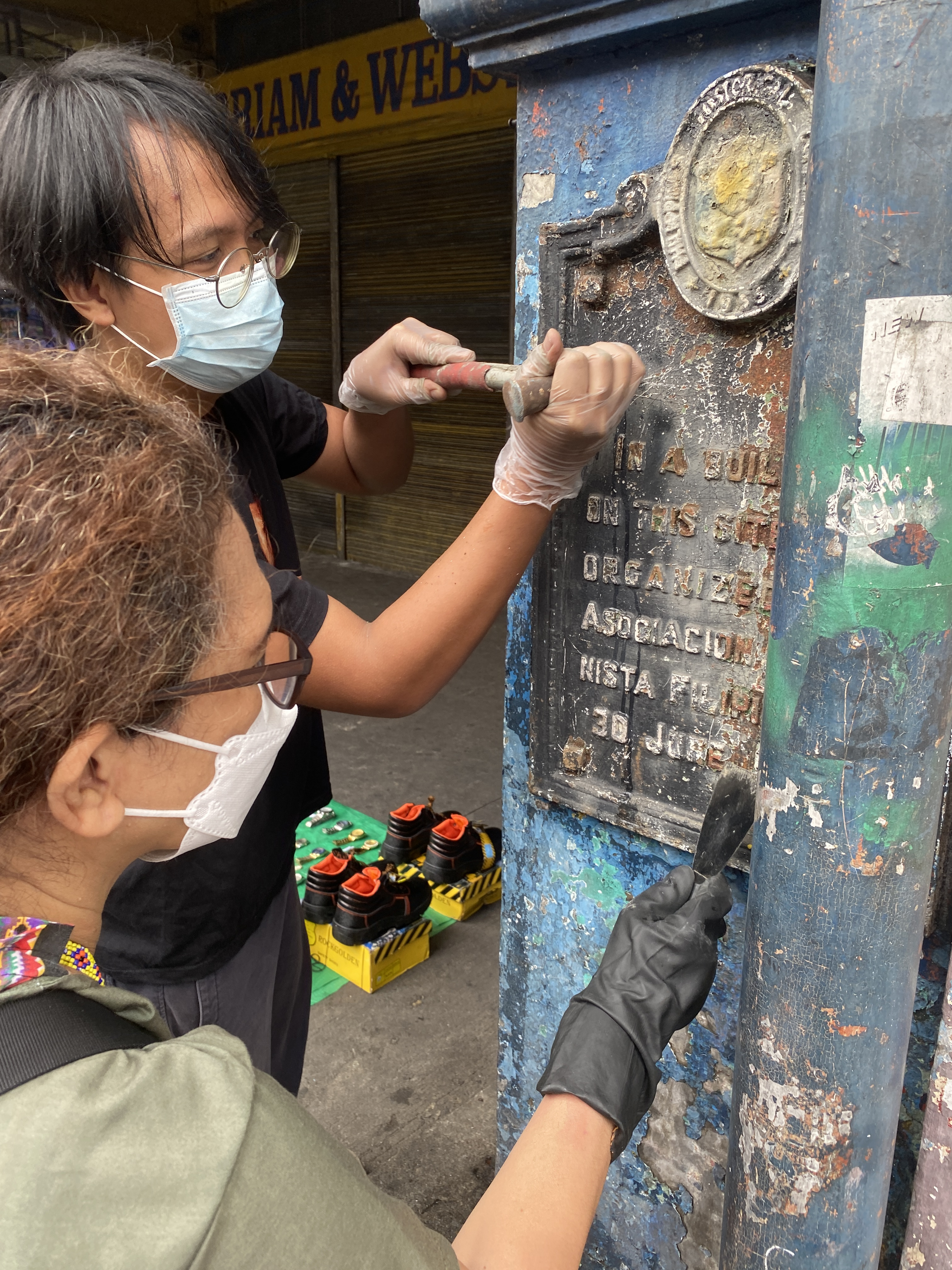
Restoration of a marker

== Markers series ==
The NHCP has overseen the installation of two major series of markers: the Quincentennial historical markers series in 2021, and the Philippine Nationhood Trail markers series starting in 2023.

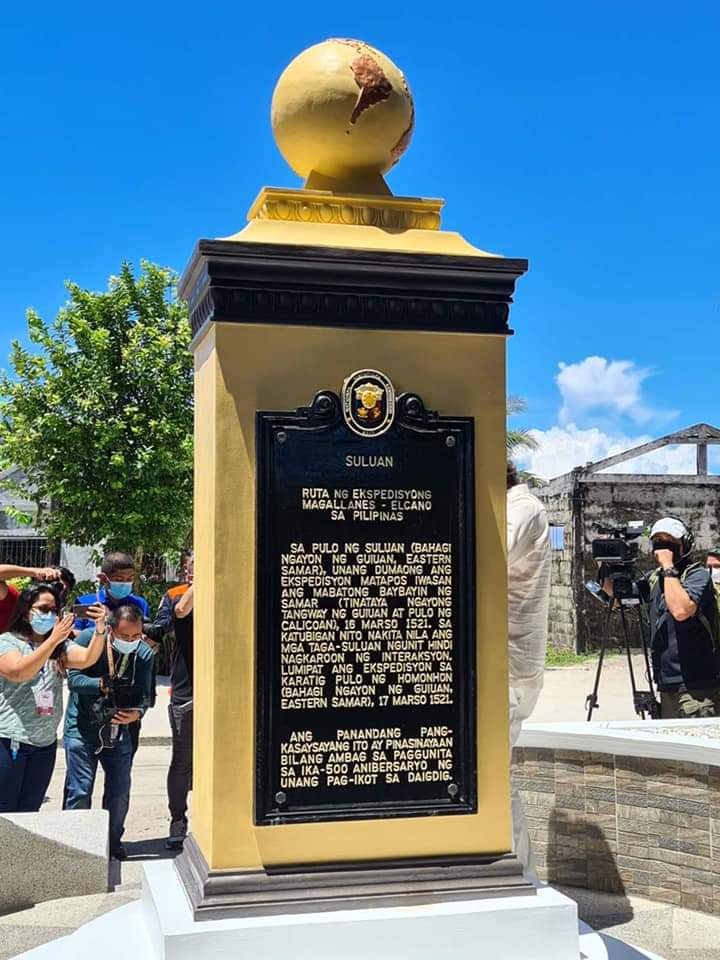
Suluan quincentennial monument and historical marker, Suluan, Guiuan, Eastern Samar, unveiled on March 16, 2021

=== Quincentennial series ===
From March to October 2021, the NHCP and the National Quincentennial Committee issued quincentennial markers as part of the 2021 Quincentennial Commemorations in the Philippines (QCP).

Thirty-four historical markers were unveiled at sites in the regions of Mimaropa, Central Visayas, Eastern Visayas, Caraga, Zamboanga Peninsula, and Bangsamoro, with ten of them in Eastern Visayas. The markers were installed with the help of the Department of the Interior and Local Government (DILG) and the Armed Forces of the Philippines. The first marker unveiled was the Suluan marker on Suluan island in Guiuan, Eastern Samar, on March 16, 2021.

The markers collectively depict select events in the Magellan-Elcano voyage through the Philippine archipelago. Each marker consists of a pedestal with a globe motif on top as a finial, with the tilt of the globe certified by the Philippine Space Agency. One side of the pedestal bears the commemorative plaque and another side bears a marble dust relief with a design dependent on the specific marker. The reliefs were made by sculptors Jonas Roces and Francis Apiles, and are based on sketches by muralist Derrick Macutay. The NHCP described the designs as an attempt to depict events of the expedition from a Filipino point of view, rather than the typical "orientalist" depictions of pre-colonial Filipinos as savages done by foreigners.

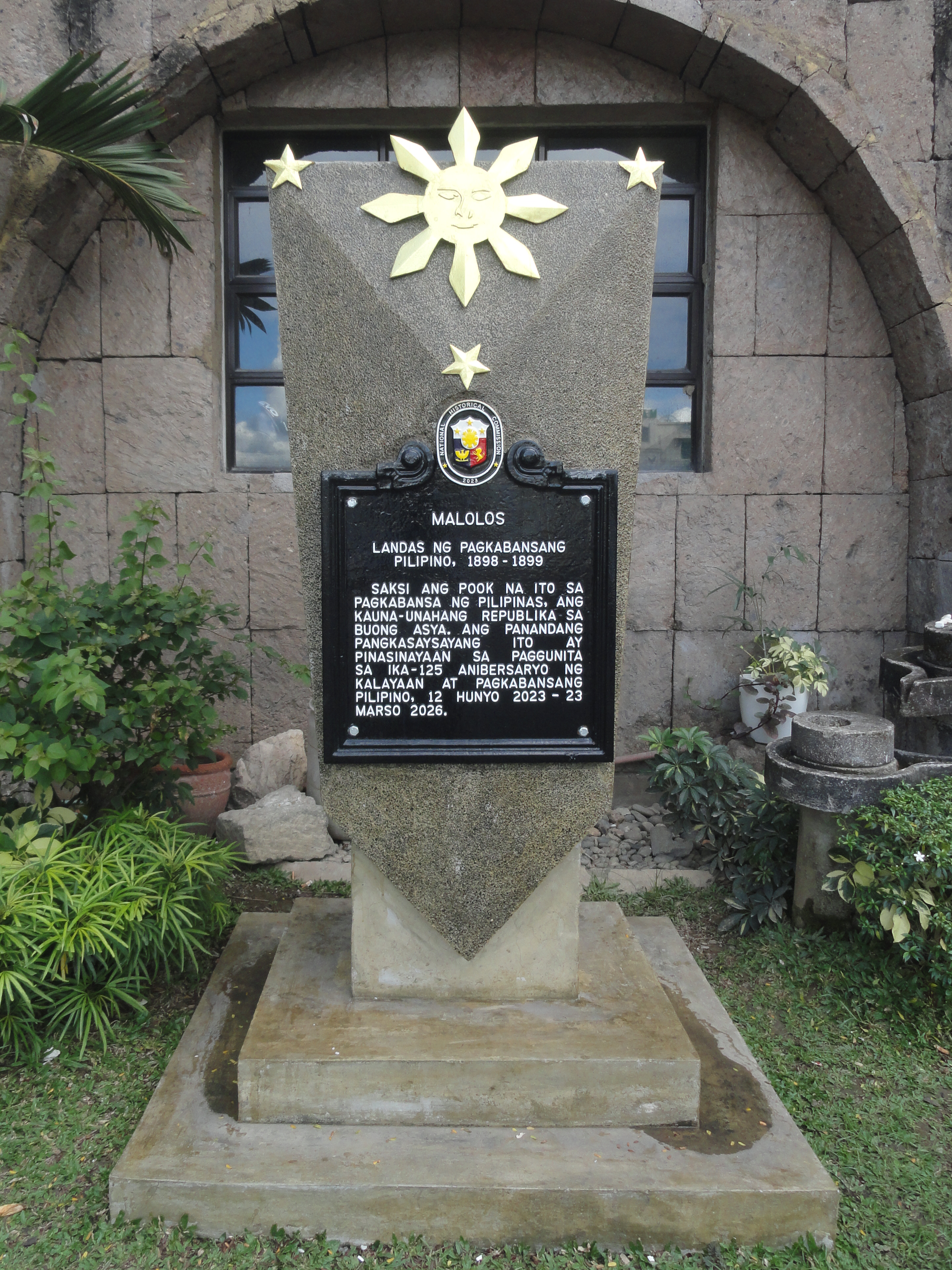
Marker and pedestal for Malolos

=== Nationhood Trail series ===
In 2023 the NHCP launched the marker series Landas ng Pagkabansang Pilipino (Philippine Nationhood Trail) to commemorate the 125th anniversary of the 1898 Philippine declaration of independence, stating that: "The markers will highlight the struggle of Asia's first democratic constitutional republic against colonialism as it fought to survive by moving across the country where it met and was aided by Filipinos of all ethnic and cultural backgrounds".

The series of markers tracks events that gave birth to the Philippine nation, starting from the proclamation of independence in Kawit, Cavite through to Emilio Aguinaldo's capture by the Americans in Palanan, Isabela in 1901. The marker locations also follow the movement of the capitals of the Philippines during the revolutionary period, with many markers depicting locations Aguinaldo and his men passed through.

Three markers were revealed in 2023, 43 in 2024, and the total markers released by 2026 will be 74. The series is expected to yield 100 markers with a standard memorial marker and pedestal.

== Historical markers by region ==
The number of NHCP historical markers by region, and overseas, are as follows:

- National Capital Region (553)
- Cordillera Administrative Region (38)
- Region I: Ilocos Region (128)
- Region II: Cagayan Valley (37)
- Region III: Central Luzon (229)
- Region IV-A: Calabarzon (294)
- Region IV-B: Mimaropa (40)
- Region V: Bicol Region (75)
- Region VI: Western Visayas (101)
- Negros Island Region (62)
- Region VII: Central Visayas (88)
- Region VIII: Eastern Visayas (51)
- Region IX: Zamboanga Peninsula (31)
- Region X: Northern Mindanao (15)
- Region XI: Davao Region (9)
- Region XII: Soccsksargen (4)
- Region XIII: Caraga (6)
- Bangsamoro Autonomous Region in Muslim Mindanao (23)
- Overseas (47)

Total = 1829

== Controversies ==
Over the years, the installation or proposal of historical markers has caused controversies over a range of issues. For example, in the late 1950s a book published by the Department of Education pointed out that there had been only three markers until then that commemorated pre-colonial conquest items; those concerning Ifugao Rice Terraces, Code of Kalantiaw (now considered a hoax), and Lapulapu. The book also pointed out how colonial resistance figures such as Apolinario dela Cruz, Andrés Malong, and Gumapos did not have markers back then, and neither did cultural heroes such as Fr. Modesto de Castro, author of Urbana at Feliza. The gravity of these historical erasures regarding pre-colonial history destroyed under Spanish conquest was seen to parallel the experience of the Mesoamericans.

Since then concerns have included the vast concentration of markers in and around Metro Manila, the language of markers, and even blatant political motivations, amongst other reasons, as listed below.

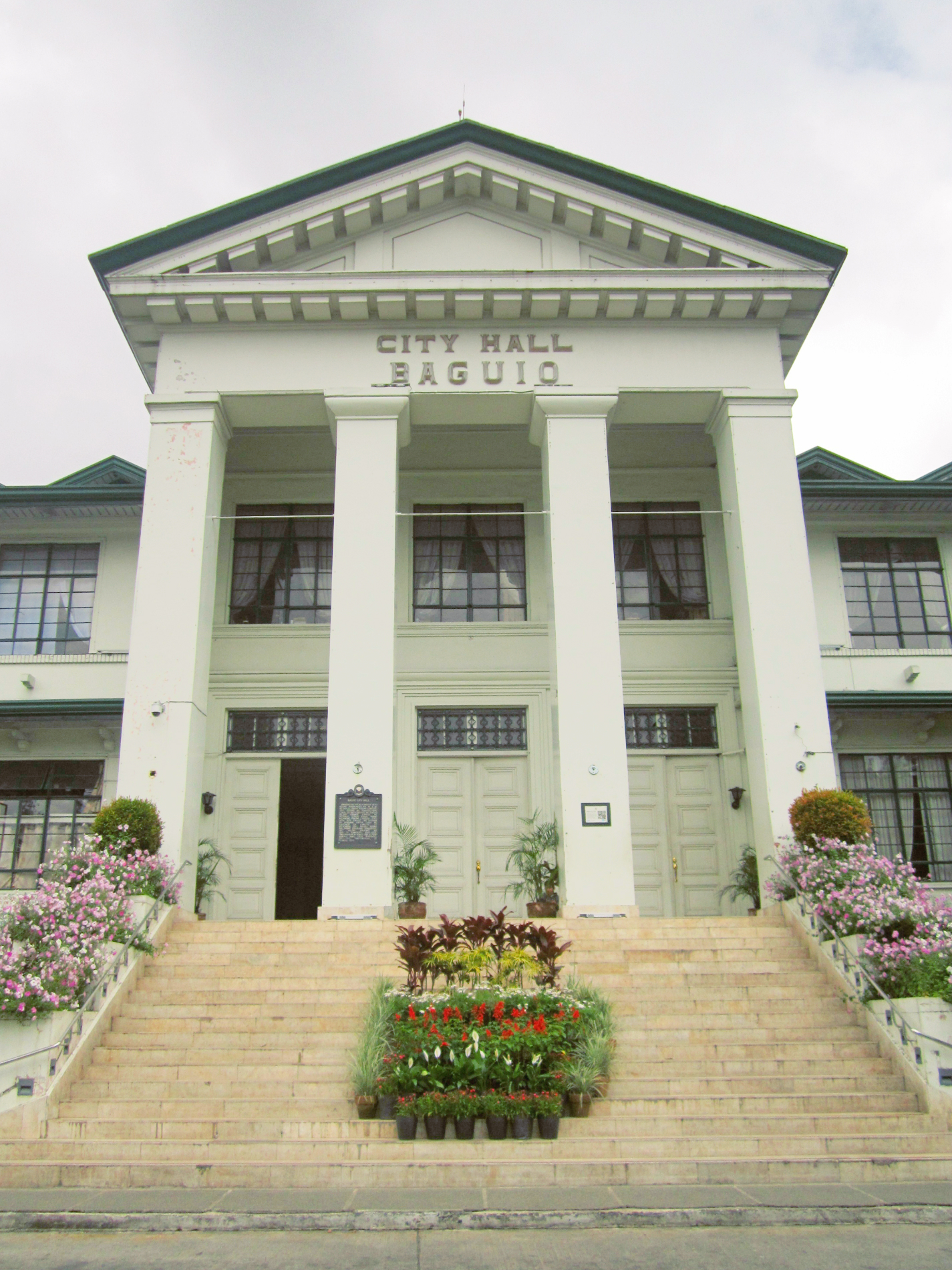
Baguio City Hall façade, with the historical marker on one of its columns

- Baguio City Hall: Markers have been used to justify the historicity of a place and help preserve the area, as with the development fo the City Hall site in Baguio. Despite the lack of resolutions or consultations, former NHCP Chairperson Maria Serena Diokno affirmed the historical significance of the area under the National Cultural Heritage Act, preventing alterations on the historical site.
- Blood Contact Between Sikatuna and Legaspi: The site of the historical marker of the Sandugo – the blood compact between Sikatuna and Legazpi – became an issue because of an NHCP board resolution that the site was located off the waters of Loay and not Tagbilaran. Despite the resolution, the marker remains in its original place.
- The Code of Kalantiaw: Installed in Batan on December 8, 1956, this historical marker remained in place even after William Henry Scott proved in 1968 that The Code of Kalantiaw and Datu Kalantiaw were hoaxes and a consequent resolution was issued by the NHI in 2004.
- Ferdinand Marcos (1917–1989): A historical marker commemorating the centennial birth anniversary of President Ferdinand Marcos in Batac, Ilocos Norte that was unveiled on September 11, 2017 was accused of being a case of historical revisionism following the controversial burial of the dictator. Baybayin, an Ateneo de Manila student organization, issued an alternative marker online which contained details of atrocities under the Marcos regime as well as a statement against historical revisionism.
- The First Congress of the Republic of the Philippines (1946–1949): The marker concerning the first congress is the biggest marker installed, measuring 52 inches by 72 inches. The original 1946 marker was replaced on January 27, 2010 after governor Carlos Padilla of Nueva Vizcaya asked why his father Constancio Padilla was missing from the list of the legislators, leading to other discrepancies emerging. Luis Taruc, Jesus Lava, and Amado Yuson of the Democratic Alliance were not on the marker even though they appeared in the congressional records, while Luis Clarin, Carlos Fortich, and Narciso Ramos were on the 1946 marker but not in the congressional records. The Lava brothers and Yuzon were dismissed from Congress, although the latter moved to the Nacionalista Party. Fortich died before completing his term and was replaced by his widow Remedios Ozamiz Fortich. Ramos was elected as the congressman for the 5th district of Pangasinan but was appointed to the United Nations soon after, being replaced by Cipriano Allas.
- Francisco "Soc" Rodrigo (1914–1998): A historical marker dedicated to Francisco "Soc" Rodrigo in Bulakan was possibly relocated due to ownership issues over the heritage house.
- Jose Rizal (1861–1896) Tarlac City, Tarlac: In 2001 the historical marker for José Rizal in Tarlac City was reported to be in a state of rot after 58 years of neglect. The marker was relocated to a better position in front of the city plaza.
- Labanan sa Karagatan ng Sibuyan (Battle of Sibuyan Sea): A group has been pushing for the transfer of the marker for the wrecked Japanese ship Musashi from the town of Alcantara to Sibuyan Island, Romblon.
- La Ignaciana: Installed in 1939, the marker for the Jesuit institution La Ignaciana in Santa Ana, Manila was stolen. A replacement marker was planned to be installed by the end of 2014, but as of 2026 this has not been done.
- Macapagal-Macaraeg Ancestral House: Installed in 2002, the marker for the mid-century Macapagal-Macaraeg house in Iligan became an issue because President Diosdado Macapagal never lived there, although it became a home for his daughter President Gloria Macapagal Arroyo.
- Bonifacio Monument in Makati: Days before Bonifacio Day in 2017 the Bonifacio centennial monument in Makati was demolished by the Department of Public Works and Highways (DPWH), along with its historical marker, so as to build a bridge connecting Ortigas and Bonifacio Global City business districts. Done without informing and seeking the approval of the NHCP, the DPWH did however state that it had informed the local government unit and temporarily removed the statue to protect it from the construction. The department also said that it had allotted ₱39 million for the restoration of the park after the project was completed.
- Comfort Women Statue in Malate: A marker to accompany the Filipina Comfort Women Statue was installed on December 8, 2017 on Baywalk, Roxas Boulevard, Malate, Manila, in memory of the comfort women of World War II. It caught the attention of officials from the Department of Foreign Affairs and the Japanese Embassy in Manila, with activist Teresita Ang-See saying that the memorial should not become an insult to Japan. On April 27, 2018 the DPWH removed the memorial to allow for a drainage improvement project along the Baywalk. Many individuals and groups, including Gabriela Women's Party, condemned the removal as unlawful since the heritage act protects markers and memorials installed by the NHCP, claiming that it was an example of historical revisionism and submission to Japanese policy. President Duterte remarked that the memorial should be placed in a private property, since the state would not want to "antagonize" other countries.
- Patricio Mariano (1877–1935): In 2015 the marker dedicated to Patricio Mariano in Escolta, Binondo, Manila received social media attention regarding its then derelict state after being pointed out to unaware local residents by reporters. On the occasion of Mariano's 80th death anniversary the Escolta Revival Movement wrote to the NHCP regarding the state of the marker, and the NHCP renovated the marker the day after.
- Pisamban Maragul (Pisamban ning Angeles) and Mansyong Pamintuan (The Large Church of Angeles and Pamintuan Mansion): The Angeles City markers for Santo Rosario Church and the Pamintuan Mansion were replaced by new ones bearing the corrected information that the 1899 anniversary of Philippine independence was celebrated at the church rather than the mansion, as previously thought.
- Pook Kung Saan Sinulat ang "Filipinas", Liriko ng Pambansang Awit Bautista, Pangasinan (Site Where "Filipinas", Lyrics to the National Anthem, was Written, Bautista, Pangasinan): Delayed negotiations with the family that owns Casa Hacienda prompted the local government of Bautista to install the marker for where "Filipinas"/"Lupang Hinirang" was composed in the town's plaza instead.
- Pook Na Kinamatayan ni Doña Aurora Aragon Quezon (Death place of Aurora Aragon Quezon): A marker in Bongabon for the site where Aurora Aragon Quezon was assassinated was rededicated on April 28, 2013 after the original marker dated February 13, 1991 went missing.
- Unang Putok sa Digmaang Filipino-Amerikano and Tulay ng San Juan (First Shot in the Filipino-American War and San Juan Bridge): Following the move to relocate the marker of the first shot of the Filipino-American War from San Juan Bridge to the corner of Sociego and Silencio Streets in Santa Mesa, Manila, former NHI Chairperson Ambeth Ocampo was declared persona non grata in San Juan. The NHI then installed a replacement marker on the bridge, identifying it as a boundary between Filipino and American soldiers during the war instead of it being the site of the first shot. A later 2023 study done by Ronnie Miravite Casalmir placed the correct location of the first shot of the Philippine-American War at the corner of Sociego and Tomas Arguelles Streets, debunking the previous findings of Dr. Benito Legarda which were the basis for the erroneous placement of the marker at the corner of Sociego and Silencio Streets.
- Alberto House, Biñan: In 2004 the NHCP approved a marker for the Alberto House, Biñan for its significance in relation to Teodora Alonso, José Rizal, and the city. However, the marker did not eventuate because the owner refused to follow preservation requests.
- Some markers have been worn out or have faded texts because of natural reasons. There have also been some markers that have been refused to be read by other Filipinos because the language was not in a local one.

== See also ==
- List of Quincentennial historical markers in the Philippines
- List of Philippine Nationhood Trail historical markers
- Lists of Cultural Properties of the Philippines
- List of National Cultural Treasures in the Philippines
