= List of historical markers of the Philippines in Bangsamoro =

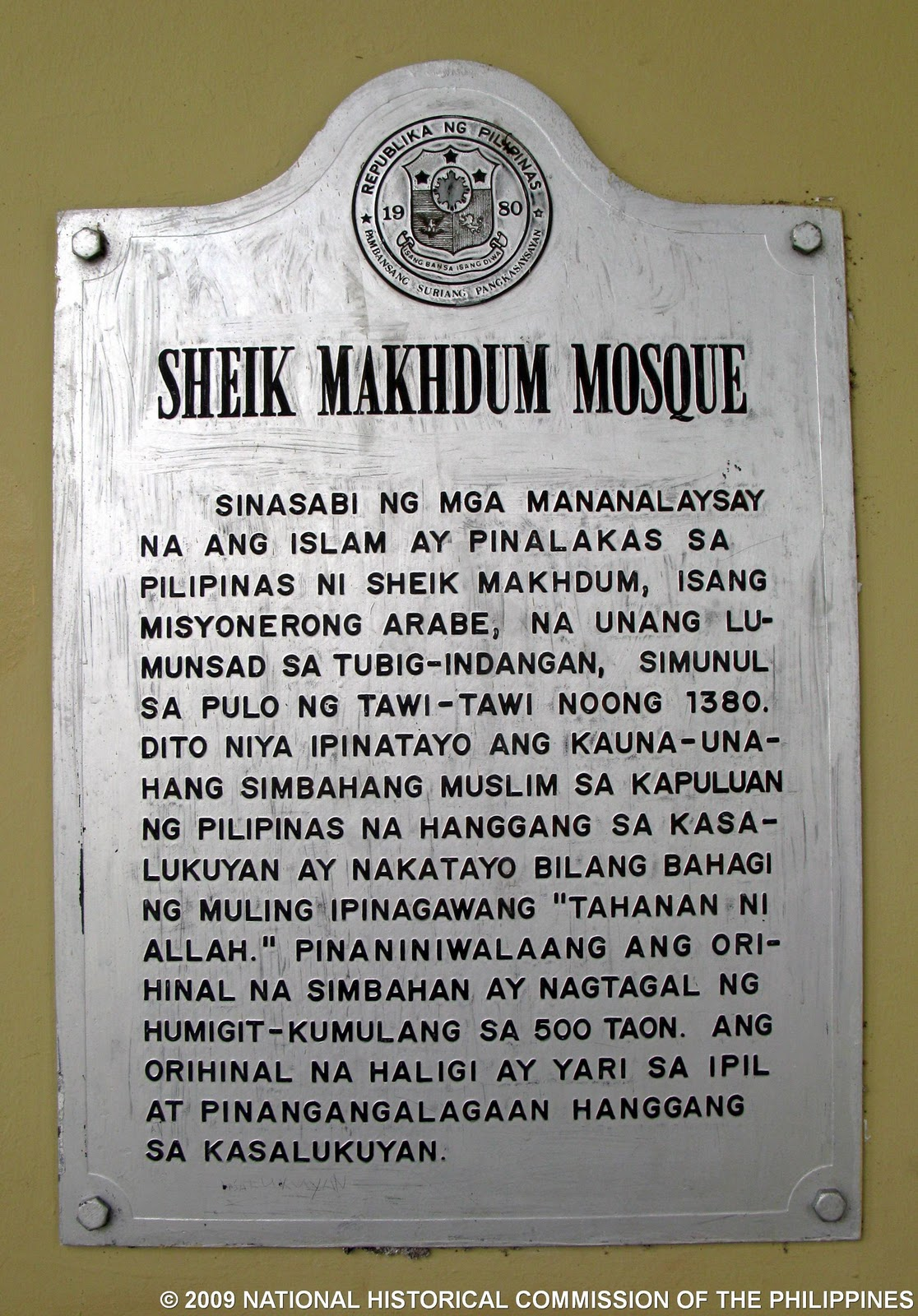
Historical marker for the Sheik Makhdum Mosque, the first mosque in the Philippines

This list of historical markers installed by the National Historical Commission of the Philippines (NHCP) in Bangsamoro Autonomous Region in Muslim Mindanao (BARMM) is an annotated list of people, places, or events in the region that have been commemorated by cast-iron plaques issued by the said commission. The plaques themselves are permanent signs installed in publicly visible locations on buildings, monuments, or in special locations.

While many Cultural Properties have historical markers installed, not all places marked with historical markers are designated into one of the particular categories of Cultural Properties.

This article lists 23 markers from the Bangsamoro Autonomous Region in Muslim Mindanao, including two that are part of the Quincentennial historical markers series.

== Lanao del Sur ==
This table lists six markers from the province of Lanao del Sur.

Marker title	Description	Location	Language	Date issued	Image
Amai Pakpak	Defended Marawi from the sieges of Govs. Gen. Valeriano Weyler and Ramón Blanco.	Amai Pakpak Central Elementary School, Marawi City	Filipino	August 18, 2024	
José Abad Santos (1886–1942)	Statesman who was martyred during World War II as he declined allegiance to the Japanese forces.		English		
José Abad Santos (1886–1942)	Where he was executed on May 7, 1942 for refusing to take the oath of allegiance to the Japanese.	Malabang	English	March 6, 2025	
Kota Marawi (Note: Fort Marawi)	Established by Dato Akadir Akobar (Amai Pakpak).	City Gymnasium, Marawi City Hall, Marawi City	Filipino	August 18, 2024	
Labanan sa Marawi 1891 (Note: Battle of Marawi 1891)	Fort Marawi, site of the battle between Amai Pakpak and Gov. Valeriano Weyler.	Lanao People's Park, Marawi City,	Filipino	August 18, 2024	
Pagtatanggol sa Marawi (Note: Defense of Marawi)	Defense under Amai Pakpak against the sieges of Govs. Gen. Valeriano Weyler and Ramón Blanco.	Lanao People's Park, Marawi City	Filipino	August 18, 2024	

== Maguindanao del Norte ==
This table lists seven markers from the province of Maguindanao del Norte.

Marker title	Description	Location	Language	Date issued	Image
Camp Brigadier General Salipada K. Pendatun	Formerly named Camp Parang, named after Salipada K. Pendatun.	Camp Parang, Parang	English	January 29, 1992	
Maguindanao; Ruta ng Ekspedisyong Magallanes–Elcano sa Pilipinas (Note: Maguindanao: Route of the Magellan–Elcano Expedition in the Philippines)	The expedition arrived at the capital of the Sultanate of Maguindanao in October 1521 and became involved in a skirmish with the warriors of Maguindanao, capturing the brother of the sultan who pointed them in the direction of Maluku.	Old Cotabato City Hall Museum, Cotabato City	Filipino	October 19, 2021	
Notre Dame Archdiocesan Seminary; Archdiocese of Cotabato	Established in 1960 in Kidapawan. Became instrumental in the evangelization of Christianity in Mindanao.	Notre Dame Archdiocesan Seminary, Sultan Kudarat	Filipino	December 12, 2010	
Oblates of Notre Dame	Established in 1956. Organized evangelization in Mindanao.	Oblates of Notre Dame, Datu Odin Sinsuat	Filipino	May 1, 2009	
Salipada K. Pendatun (1912–1985)	Established the guerilla movement in Cotabato in WWII. Became the representative of Maguindanao at the Regular Batasang Pambansa from 1984 to 1985.	Camp Brigadier Gen. Salipada K. Pendatun, Parang	Filipino	April 2, 2014	
Simbahang Inmaculada Concepcion ng Tamontaka (Note: Church of the Immaculate Conception of Tamontaka)	Church built in 1872 which became a center for the evangelization of Cotabato.	Tamontaka, Cotabato City	Filipino	December 8, 2004	
Sultan Dipatuan Kudarat c. 1590–1671	Unified Muslim leaders and fought against the Spaniards from 1635 to 1645.	Sultan Kudarat Statue, Cotabato City	Filipino	December 19, 2004	

== Maguindanao del Sur ==
This table lists one marker from the province of Maguindanao del Sur.

Marker title	Description	Location	Language	Date issued	Image
Salipada K. Pendatun (1912–1985)	Established the guerilla movement in Cotabato in WWII. Became the representative of Maguindanao at the Regular Batasang Pambansa from 1984 to 1985.	Salipada K. Pendatun tomb, General Salipada K. Pendatun	Filipino	2012	

== Tawi-Tawi ==
This table lists eight markers from the province of Tawi-Tawi.

Marker title	Description	Location	Language	Date issued	Image
Bantayog ng Kalayaan sa Tawi-Tawi (Note: Tawi-Tawi Freedom Monument)	Commemorates the Sama people's contribution to freedom.	Bongao	Filipino	November 3, 2026	
Burial Site of Sheik Karimol-Makhdum in Sibutu, Tawi-Tawi	Declared as a National Historical Shrine.	Sibutu	English	November 6, 2023	
Cagayan (Mapun); Ruta ng Ekspedisyong Magallanes–Elcano sa Pilipinas (Note: Cagayan (Mapun): Route of the Magellan–Elcano Expedition in the Philippines)	It was described that the inhabitants here were Muslim and brave fighters.	Isla Keana, Brgy. Iruk-Iruk, Mapun	Filipino	September 6, 2021	
Sheik Makdum Mosque	First mosque in the country.	Tubing Indangan, Simunul	Filipino	November 7, 1980	
Sheik Karimul Makhdum Mosque in Tubig-Indangan, Simunul, Tawi-Tawi	Declared as a National Historical Landmark.	Tubig Indangan, Simunul	English	November 7, 2023	
Turtle Islands	Leased by the sultan of Sulu to the British North Borneo Company.	Taganak, Turtle Islands (marker currently within NHCP storage)	English	1948	
Turtle Islands	Leased by the sultan of Sulu to the British North Borneo Company.	Taganak, Turtle Islands	Filipino, English	1968	
Turtle Islands	Leased by the sultan of Sulu to the British North Borneo Company.	Taganak, Turtle Islands	Filipino	October 1969	

== Special Geographic Area (Cotabato) ==
This table lists one marker from the Special Geographic Area located geographically in the province of Cotabato.

Marker title	Description	Location	Language	Date issued	Image
Fort Pikit	Fort built by Spaniards in 1893 for their conquest of Mindanao. Used by American and Japanese troops.	Pikit	Filipino	January 8, 2013	

== See also ==
- List of Cultural Properties of the Philippines in Bangsamoro

== Bibliography ==
- National Historical Institute (1994). Historical Markers: Regions V-XIII. National Historical Institute.
- National Historical Institute (2008). Historical Markers (1992 - 2006). National Historical Institute.
- A list of sites and structures with historical markers, as of 16 January 2012
- A list of institutions with historical markers, as of 16 January 2012
