= Lists of Cultural Properties of the Philippines =

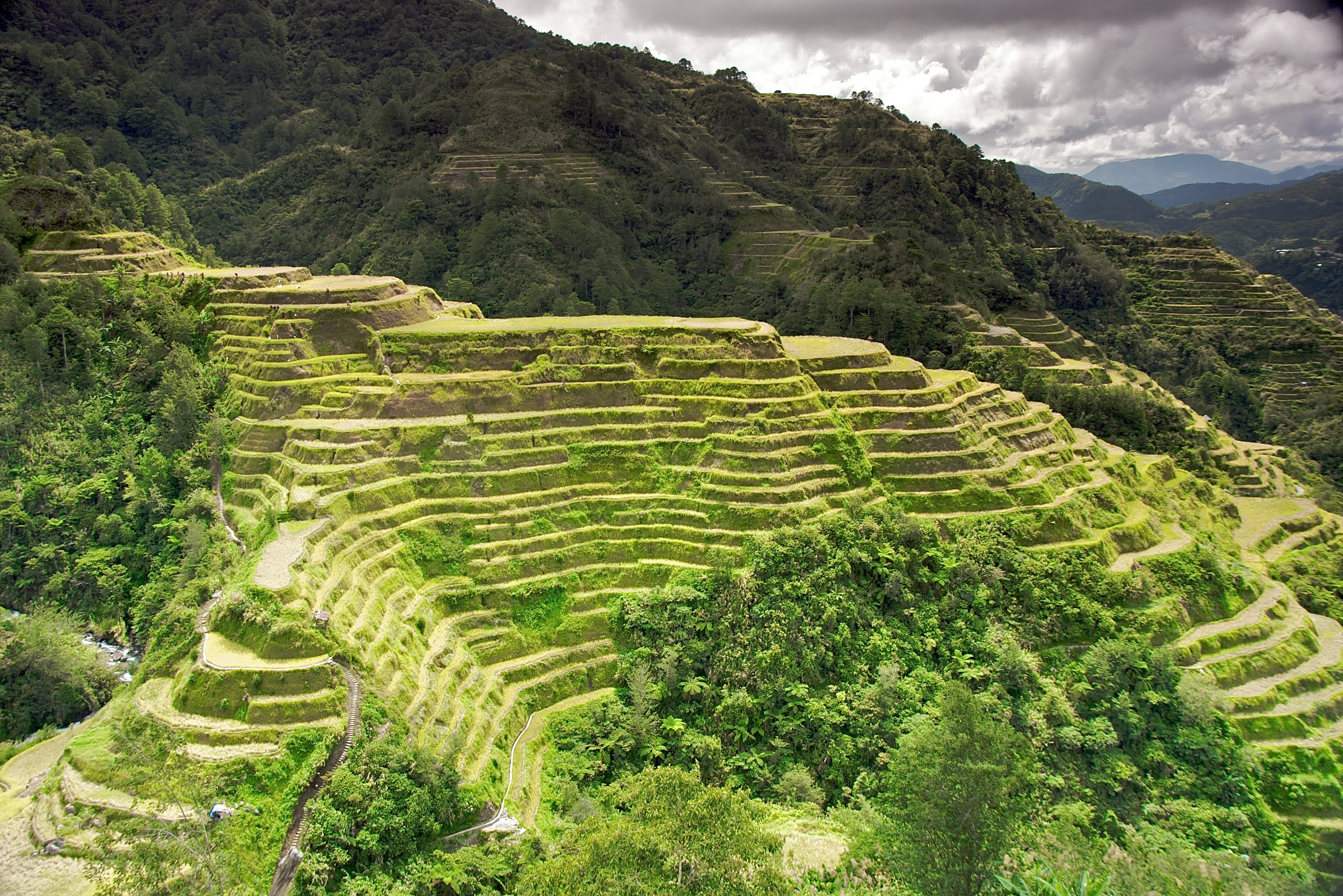
The Banaue Rice Terraces is an example of a nationally recognized cultural property.

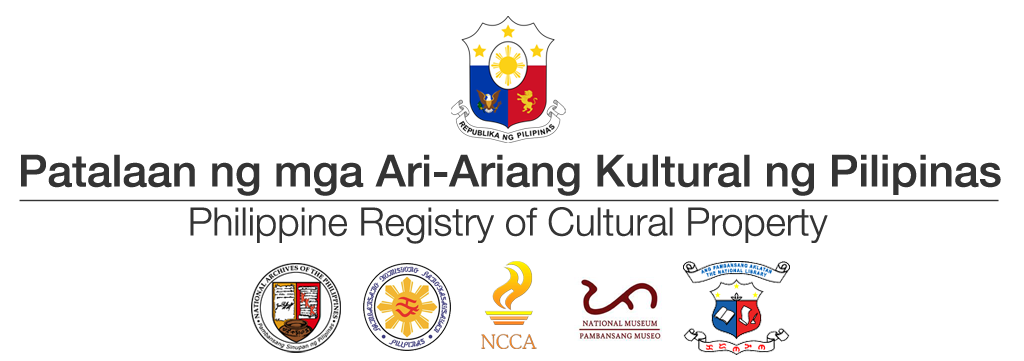
Current logo for the Philippine Registry of Cultural Property

These lists contain an overview of the government recognized cultural properties in the Philippines. The lists are based on official lists provided by the National Commission for Culture and the Arts, National Historical Commission of the Philippines, and the National Museum of the Philippines. The lists have been subdivided per region.

== Cultural sites by region ==
- List of Cultural Properties of the Philippines in Metro Manila
- List of Cultural Properties of the Philippines in the Cordillera Administrative Region
- List of Cultural Properties of the Philippines in the Ilocos Region
- List of Cultural Properties of the Philippines in Cagayan Valley
- List of Cultural Properties of the Philippines in Central Luzon
- List of Cultural Properties of the Philippines in Calabarzon
- List of Cultural Properties of the Philippines in Mimaropa
- List of Cultural Properties of the Philippines in the Bicol Region
- List of Cultural Properties of the Philippines in Western Visayas
- List of Cultural Properties of the Philippines in the Negros Island Region
- List of Cultural Properties of the Philippines in Central Visayas
- List of Cultural Properties of the Philippines in Eastern Visayas
- List of Cultural Properties of the Philippines in Zamboanga Peninsula
- List of Cultural Properties of the Philippines in Northern Mindanao
- List of Cultural Properties of the Philippines in the Davao Region
- List of Cultural Properties of the Philippines in Caraga
- List of Cultural Properties of the Philippines in Bangsamoro

There are no designated cultural properties in Soccsksargen.

== Cultural sites by inscription ==
- List of World Heritage Sites in the Philippines
- List of National Cultural Treasures in the Philippines
- List of National Geological Monuments in the Philippines
- List of Important Cultural Properties in the Philippines
- List of National Shrines in the Philippines
