= List of Catholic churches in the Philippines =

This is a list of Roman Catholic churches and cathedrals in the Philippines. Roman Catholicism is the most common religion in the Philippines.

== Abra ==
- Bangued Cathedral
- Tayum Church

== Aklan ==
- Kalibo Cathedral

== Albay ==
- Cagsawa Ruins
- Daraga Church
- Legazpi Cathedral
- Tabaco Church

== Basilan ==
- Isabela Cathedral

== Bataan ==
- Abucay Church
- Balanga Cathedral
- Hermosa Church
- Mariveles Church
- Orani Church
- Orion Church
- Samal Church

== Batanes ==
- Basco Cathedral
- Itbayat Church
- Ivana Church
- Mahatao Church
- Sabtang Church

== Batangas ==
- Archdiocesan Shrine of Our Lady of Caysasay
- Bauan Church
- Ibaan Church
- Minor Basilica of the Immaculate Conception (Batangas City)
- Immaculate Conception Parish Church (Balayan)
- Lobo Church
- Lemery Church
- Lipa Cathedral
- Padre Pio Shrine
- Saint Joseph the Patriarch Church (Batangas)
- Taal Basilica

== Benguet ==
- Baguio Cathedral
- San Jose Parish Church (La Trinidad)

== Biliran ==
- Naval Cathedral (Biliran)

== Bohol ==
- Alburquerque Church
- Baclayon Church
- Calape Church
- Dauis Church
- Loay Church
- Loboc Church
- Loon Church
- Maribojoc Church
- San Nicolas Church (Dimiao)
- Tagbilaran Cathedral
- Talibon Cathedral

== Bulacan ==
- Saint Augustine Parish Church (Baliwag)
- Barasoain Church
- Diocesan Shrine and Parish of Nuestra Señora de la Asuncion
- Guiguinto Church
- Immaculate Conception Parish Church (Santa Maria)
- Malolos Cathedral
- Meycauayan Church
- National Shrine of Saint Anne (Philippines)
- National Shrine of the Divine Mercy (Philippines)
- Obando Church
- Our Lady of Most Holy Rosary Parish Church (Makinabang)
- Our Lady of Mount Carmel Parish Church (Pulong Buhangin)
- Saint Martin of Tours Parish Church (Bocaue)
- Pandiyosesis na Dambana at Parokya ni Sta. Rita de Cascia -Guiguinto, Bulacan
- San Isidro Labrador Church (Pulilan)
- San Juan Bautista Church (Calumpit)
- San Juan de Dios Church (San Rafael)
- San Lorenzo de Roma Church (Balagtas)
- San Miguel Arcangel Church (Marilao)
- San Miguel Arcangel Church (San Miguel, Bulacan)
- Santa Monica Parish Church (Angat)
- Santiago Apostol Church (Plaridel)
- Shrine of Saint Andrew Kim
- Sub-Parish Church of Santo Cristo

== Cagayan ==
- Lal-lo Church
- Basilica of Our Lady of Piat
- Pamplona Church
- Pata Church Ruins
- Saint Raymond of Peñafort Parish Church (Malaueg)
- Tuguegarao Cathedral

== Camarines Norte ==
- Daet Cathedral
- Saint John the Baptist Church (Daet)
- Saint Peter the Apostle Church (Vinzons)

== Camarines Sur ==
- Baao Church
- Buhi Church
- Bula Church
- Iriga Church
- Magarao Church
- Milaor Church
- Nabua Church
- Naga Cathedral
- Our Lady of Peñafrancia Shrine
- Peñafrancia Basilica
- Quipayo Church
- St. Anthony of Padua Parish Church (Camaligan)

== Capiz ==
- Roxas Cathedral
- Panay Church

== Cavite ==
- Diocesan Shrine of Saint Augustine
- Immaculate Conception Parish Church (Dasmariñas)
- Imus Cathedral
- Maragondon Church
- Naic Church
- Our Lady of Candelaria Parish Church (Silang)
- St. Francis of Assisi Parish Church (General Trias)
- Saint Gregory the Great Parish Church (Indang)
- San Roque Church (Cavite City)
- St. Mary Magdalene Church (Kawit)

== Cebu ==
- Archdiocesan Shrine of Santa Teresa de Avila
- Argao Church
- Basilica del Santo Niño
- Boljoon Church
- Cebu Metropolitan Cathedral
- Dalaguete Church
- Mandaue Church
- Senior Citizens' Park Chapel
- Sibonga Church
- St. Catherine's Church, Carcar

== Cotabato ==
- Cotabato Cathedral
- Santo Niño Church (Midsayap)

== Davao del Sur ==
- Davao Cathedral

== Davao Oriental ==
- San Salvador del Mundo Church (Caraga)

== Eastern Samar ==
- Borongan Cathedral
- Guiuan Church

== Ilocos Norte ==
- Bacarra Church
- Badoc Basilica
- Dingras Church
- Laoag Cathedral
- Paoay Church
- Piddig Church
- San Nicolas Church (Ilocos Norte)
- Santa Monica Parish Church (Sarrat)

== Ilocos Sur ==
- Bantay Church
- Candon Church
- Magsingal Church
- Santa Maria Church (Ilocos Sur)
- Sinait Basilica
- Vigan Cathedral

== Iloilo ==
- Arevalo Church
- Saint Anthony of Padua Church (Barotac Nuevo, Iloilo)
- Dingle Church
- Dumangas Church
- Guimbal Church
- Jaro Cathedral
- La Paz Church (Iloilo)
- San Vicente Ferrer Church (Leganes, Iloilo)
- Mandurriao Church
- Miagao Church
- Molo Church
- Oton Church
- Passi Church
- San Joaquin Church (Iloilo)
- San Jose Church (Iloilo)
- Santa Barbara Church, Santa Barbara, Iloilo
- Tigbauan Church

== Isabela ==
- Gamu Cathedral
- Gamu Church
- Ilagan Cathedral
- National Shrine of Our Lady of the Visitation of Guibang
- San Pablo Church Ruins
- Tumauini Church

== Kalinga ==
- Tabuk Cathedral

== La Union ==
- Bacnotan Church
- Balaoan Church
- Bangar Church
- Namacpacan Church
- Basilica Minore of Our Lady of Charity
- San Fernando Cathedral (La Union)

== Laguna ==
- Saint John the Baptist Parish Church (Calamba)
- Cavinti Church
- Saint John the Baptist Parish Church (Liliw)
- Immaculate Conception Parish Church (Los Baños)
- Nuestra Señora de Candelaria Parish Church (Mabitac)
- Nagcarlan Church
- Saint James the Apostle Parish Church (Paete)
- Our Lady of Guadalupe Parish Church (Pagsanjan)
- Saint Peter of Alcantara Parish Church (Pakil)
- Pangil Church
- Pila Church
- Saint Gregory the Great Parish Church (Majayjay)
- Saint Paul the First Hermit Cathedral
- Saint Therese of the Child Jesus Parish Church (UPLB)
- Saints Peter and Paul Parish Church (Siniloan)
- San Agustin Parish Church (Bay, Laguna)
- San Sebastian Parish Church (Lumban)
- Immaculate Conception Parish Church (Santa Cruz)
- Santa Maria Magdalena Parish Church (Magdalena, Laguna)
- Nuestra Señora de los Angeles Parish Church (Santa Maria)
- Santa Rosa de Lima Parish Church (Santa Rosa, Laguna)

== Lanao del Norte ==
- Iligan Cathedral

== Lanao del Sur ==
- St. Mary's Cathedral (Marawi)

== Leyte ==
- Palo Cathedral
- Santo Niño Church (Tacloban)
- Tanauan Church (Leyte)

== Marinduque ==
- Boac Cathedral

== Masbate ==
- Masbate Cathedral

== Misamis Occidental ==
- Jimenez Church
- Ozamiz Cathedral

== Misamis Oriental ==
- Immaculate Conception Parish Church (Jasaan)
- Saint Augustine Metropolitan Cathedral

== Mountain Province ==
- Bontoc Cathedral

== Negros Occidental ==
- Kabankalan Cathedral
- San Carlos Cathedral (Negros Occidental)
- San Diego Pro-Cathedral, Silay
- San Sebastian Cathedral (Bacolod)
- St. Joseph the Worker Chapel, Victorias

== Negros Oriental ==
- Bacong Church
- Dumaguete Cathedral

== Northern Samar ==
- Capul Church
- Catarman Cathedral

== Nueva Ecija ==
- Cabanatuan Cathedral
- Gapan Church
- Peñaranda Church
- San Jose Cathedral (Nueva Ecija)

== Nueva Vizcaya ==
- Bayombong Cathedral
- San Vicente Ferrer Church (Dupax del Sur)
- Santa Catalina de Siena Church (Bambang)

== Occidental Mindoro ==
- St. Joseph Cathedral (San Jose, Occidental Mindoro)

== Oriental Mindoro ==
- Calapan Cathedral
- Kuta Church Ruins
- Simbahang Bato (Naujan)

== Palawan ==
- Puerto Princesa Cathedral
- Taytay Cathedral

== Pampanga ==
- Betis Church
- San Vicente Ferrer Church (Calulut)
- Guagua Church
- Holy Rosary Parish Church (Angeles City)
- Nuestra Señora de la Merced Parish
- Pio Chapel
- San Agustin Church (Lubao)
- San Andres Apostol Church (Candaba)
- San Bartolome Church (Magalang)
- San Fernando Cathedral (Pampanga)
- San Guillermo Parish Church (Bacolor)
- San Jose Obrero Church (Floridablanca)
- San Jose Matulid Chapel
- San Luis Gonzaga Parish Church
- San Miguel Arcangel Church (Masantol)
- San Nicolas de Tolentino Church (Macabebe)
- San Pedro Apostol Church (Apalit)
- San Simon Church
- Santa Catalina de Alejandria Church (Porac)
- Santa Catalina Parish Church (Arayat)
- Santa Monica Parish Church (Minalin)

== Pangasinan ==
- Alaminos Cathedral
- Dagupan Cathedral
- Epiphany of Our Lord Co-Cathedral Parish
- Manaoag Church
- Minor Basilica of Saint Dominic (San Carlos)
- Our Lady of Lourdes Parish Church (Bugallon)
- Saint Ildephonse of Seville Parish Church (Malasiqui)
- Saint James the Great Parish Church (Bolinao)
- Saint Joseph the Patriarch Parish Church (Aguilar)
- Saint Peter the Martyr Parish Church (Sual)
- Saint Raymond of Peñafort Parish Church (Mangatarem)
- Saint Vincent Ferrer Parish Church (Bayambang)
- Saints Peter and Paul Parish Church (Calasiao)
- Santo Niño Parish Church (Mabini)
- Santuario de San Juan Evangelista
- Urdaneta Cathedral

== Quezon ==
- Atimonan Church
- Gumaca Cathedral
- Infanta Cathedral
- Kamay ni Hesus Healing Church
- Lucban Church
- Lucena Cathedral
- Mauban Church
- Saint Anne Parish Church (Pagbilao)
- Saint Francis of Assisi Parish Church (Sariaya)
- Tayabas Basilica

== Rizal ==
- Antipolo Cathedral
- Baras Church
- Binangonan Church
- Bosoboso Church
- Cainta Church
- Morong Church
- Pililla Church
- Tanay Church
- Taytay Church

== Romblon ==
- Banton Church
- Romblon Cathedral
- St. Vincent Ferrer Parish Church (Odiongan)

== Samar ==
- Calbayog Cathedral

== Sorsogon ==
- Sorsogon Cathedral

== Siquijor ==
- Lazi Church

== Southern Leyte ==
- Maasin Cathedral

== Sulu ==
- Jolo Cathedral

== Surigao del Norte ==
- Surigao Cathedral

== Tarlac ==
- Immaculate Conception Parish Church (Concepcion)
- Tarlac Cathedral

== Zambales ==
- Iba Cathedral
- Masinloc Church

== Zamboanga del Norte ==
- Dipolog Cathedral

== Zamboanga del Sur ==
- Pagadian Cathedral
- Zamboanga Cathedral

== Zamboanga Sibugay ==
- Ipil Cathedral
- Nuestra Señora de los Remedios Parish

== Metro Manila ==
- Baclaran Church
- Caloocan Cathedral
- Dambanang Kawayan
- Diocesan Shrine of the Five Wounds of Our Lord Jesus Christ
- Ermita de San Nicolas de Tolentino
- Jesús de la Peña Chapel
- Las Piñas Church
- Nature Church
- Christ the King Parish Church (BF Homes, Caloocan)
- National Shrine of Our Lady of Fatima
- Nuestra Señora de Gracia Church
- Our Lady of the Abandoned Parish Church (Marikina)
- Parañaque Cathedral
- Pasig Cathedral
- Pateros Church
- Pinaglabanan Church
- Polo Church
- Saint Andrew the Apostle Church
- San Bartolome Church (Malabon)
- San Pedro Macati Church
- Santo Rosario de Pasig Church
- Santo Tomas de Villanueva Church
- Santuario de San Jose
- Santuario del Santo Cristo
- Shrine of St. Therese of the Child Jesus
- Christ The King Parish, Las Piñas City
- Taguig Church

=== Manila ===
* Archdiocesan Shrine of Espiritu Santo
- Kambal na Krus Chapel
- Malate Church
- Manila Cathedral
- National Shrine of Saint Jude (Philippines)
- Our Lady of Montserrat Abbey
- Paco Church
- Pandacan Church
- PLM Chapel
- Quiapo Church
- Sampaloc Church
- San Agustin Church (Manila)
- San Francisco Church (Manila)
- San José de Trozo Parish
- San Miguel Church (Manila)
- San Sebastian Church (Manila)
- San Vicente de Paul Church (Manila)
- Santa Ana Church (Manila)
- Santa Cruz Church (Manila)
- Tondo Church

=== Quezon City ===
- Church of the Gesù, Quezon City
- Cubao Cathedral
- EDSA Shrine
- Mount Carmel Shrine (Quezon City)
- National Shrine of Our Lady of Lourdes
- Novaliches Cathedral
- Parish of the Holy Sacrifice
- San Nicolas de Tolentino Parish Church (Quezon City)
- Santo Domingo Church (Quezon City)
- Basilica Minore de San Pedro Bautista
- Shrine of Our Lady of Mercy

== Cotabato City ==
- Tamontaka Church

== See also ==
- List of Catholic dioceses in the Philippines
- List of cathedrals in the Philippines
- List of Anglican churches in the Philippines
- List of Philippine Independent Church churches
- Baroque Churches of the Philippines
- List of Baroque churches in the Philippines
- Church architecture

== Sources ==
- "Diocese". Claretian Publications. Claretian Communications Foundation, Inc. Archived from the original on January 2, 2024.
