= List of Cultural Properties of the Philippines in the Bicol Region =

This list contains an overview of the government recognized Cultural Properties of the Philippines in the Bicol Region. The list is based on the official lists provided by the National Commission on Culture and the Arts, National Historical Commission of the Philippines and the National Museum of the Philippines.

Cultural Property wmph identifier (Note: wmph is an internal identifier used by Wikimedia Philippines to identify the monument. This is not an official identifier, and only shown temporarily in the templates until the government creates an updated complete list.)	Site name	Description	Province	City or municipality	Address	Coordinates	Image
PH-05-0001	Cagsawa Ruins	Located in the town of Daraga, Albay in the Philippines. The church of Cagsaua was built after 1734 by Francisco Blanco. The February 1, 1814 eruption of Mt. Mayon located 10 kilometres (6.2 mi) away destroyed the church.	Albay	Daraga		13°09′58″N 123°42′04″E	Upload file
PH-05-0004	Legazpi Church		Albay	Legazpi		13°08′18″N 123°44′00″E	Upload file
PH-05-0006	Oas Church		Albay	Oas		13°15′31″N 123°30′01″E	Upload file
PH-05-0007	Tabaco Church		Albay	Tabaco	Rizal Street	13°21′35″N 123°43′45″E	Upload file
PH-05-0008	Smith, Bell & Co. Trading House		Albay	Tabaco			Upload file
PH-05-0009	First José Rizal Monument		Camarines Norte	Daet			Upload file
PH-05-0010	Wenceslao Vinzons Shrine		Camarines Norte	Vinzons			Upload file
PH-05-0011	Freedom Monument		Camarines Norte	Basud			Upload Photo
PH-05-0012	San Pedro Apostol Church		Camarines Norte	Vinzons		14°10′22″N 122°54′24″E	Upload file
PH-05-0013	Jorge Barlin Monument		Camarines Sur	Baao			Upload file
PH-05-0014	Filipino-Japanese Friendship Historical Landmark		Camarines Sur	Boncao Hill, Mount Isarog, Pili			Upload Photo
PH-05-0015	Quipayo Church		Camarines Sur	Calabanga		13°41′57″N 123°12′03″E	Upload Photo
PH-05-0016	Holy Rosary Minor Seminary		Camarines Sur	Naga City		13°37′42″N 123°11′11″E	Upload file
PH-05-0017	Baao Church		Camarines Sur	Baao		13°27′16″N 123°21′59″E	Upload file
PH-05-0018	Buhi Church		Camarines Sur	Buhi		13°25′59″N 123°31′02″E	Upload file
PH-05-0019	Bula Church		Camarines Sur	Bula		13°28′07″N 123°16′39″E	Upload file
PH-05-0020	Calabanga Church		Camarines Sur	Calabanga		13°42′29″N 123°12′58″E	Upload file
PH-05-0021	Iriga Church		Camarines Sur	Iriga		13°25′12″N 123°24′45″E	Upload file
PH-05-0022	Philtranco Service Enterprises, Inc.		Camarines Sur	Iriga City			Upload file
PH-05-0023	Magarao Church		Camarines Sur	Magarao		13°39′41″N 123°11′24″E	Upload file
PH-05-0024	Milaor Church		Camarines Sur	Milaor			Upload file
PH-05-0025	Holy Cross Parish	Constructed in 1578, the third oldest church in the Bicol Region, after the Naga Cathedral and San Francisco Parish, both in Naga City.	Camarines Sur	Nabua		13°24′27″N 123°22′22″E	Upload file
PH-05-0026	Naga Cathedral	The oldest known church in the Bicol Region. Known as the mother church of all churches in Southern Luzon, it is also the biggest of all churches in the same area. The Naga Cathedral was constructed in 1575.	Camarines Sur	Naga City	Elias Angeles Street, Santa Cruz, CBD I, Naga City	13°37′42″N 123°11′14″E	Upload file
PH-05-0027	Our Lady of Peñafrancia Shrine	One of the oldest shrines in the Philippines. It was the old home of the Our Lady of Peñafrancia before she was transferred to the Basilica. The church was constructed in 1742 and completed in 1750.	Camarines Sur	Naga City		13°38′04″N 123°11′44″E	Upload file
PH-05-0028	Minor Basilica of the Our Lady of Peñafrancia	National Shrine and the new home of Our Lady of Peñafrancia	Camarines Sur	Naga City	Balatas Road, Balatas, Naga City		Upload file
PH-05-0029	San Francisco Parish Church	Instituted by the Franciscans in 1578 in their first evangelical mission in the Philippines. Second oldest church in the Bicol Region, after Naga Cathedral.	Camarines Sur	Naga City	Peñafrancia Ave. cor. San Francisco Drive, San Francisco, CBD I, Naga City.		Upload file
PH-05-0005	International Chamber of Commerce of Bicol	Instituted in Naga City by the American colonizers to keep track of Bicol trade.	Camarines Sur	Naga City	Barlin Street, Santa Cruz, CBD I, Naga City		Upload Photo
PH-05-0007	Casa Tribunal de Nueva Caceres	The old Casa Tribunal or Ayuntamiento of Nueva Caceres established during the Spanish times.	Camarines Sur	Naga City	Elias Angeles corner Arana Streets, San Francisco, CBD I, Naga City		Upload Photo
PH-05-0030	Universidad de Santa Isabel	Oldest normal school for girls in Southeast Asia	Camarines Sur	Naga City	Elias Angeles Street cor. Santonja Street, Peñafrancia, Naga City		Upload file
PH-05-0031	University of Nueva Caceres	Oldest university in Luzon outside of Metro Manila	Camarines Sur	Naga City	J. Hernandez Avenue, Santa Cruz, Naga City		Upload file
PH-05-0032	Batalay Shrine		Catanduanes	Bato			Upload file

== See also ==
- List of historical markers of the Philippines in the Bicol Region
