= Mauban Church =

Roman Catholic church in Quezon, Philippines

- Saint Bonaventure Parish Church
- Parokya ni San Buenaventura (Filipino)
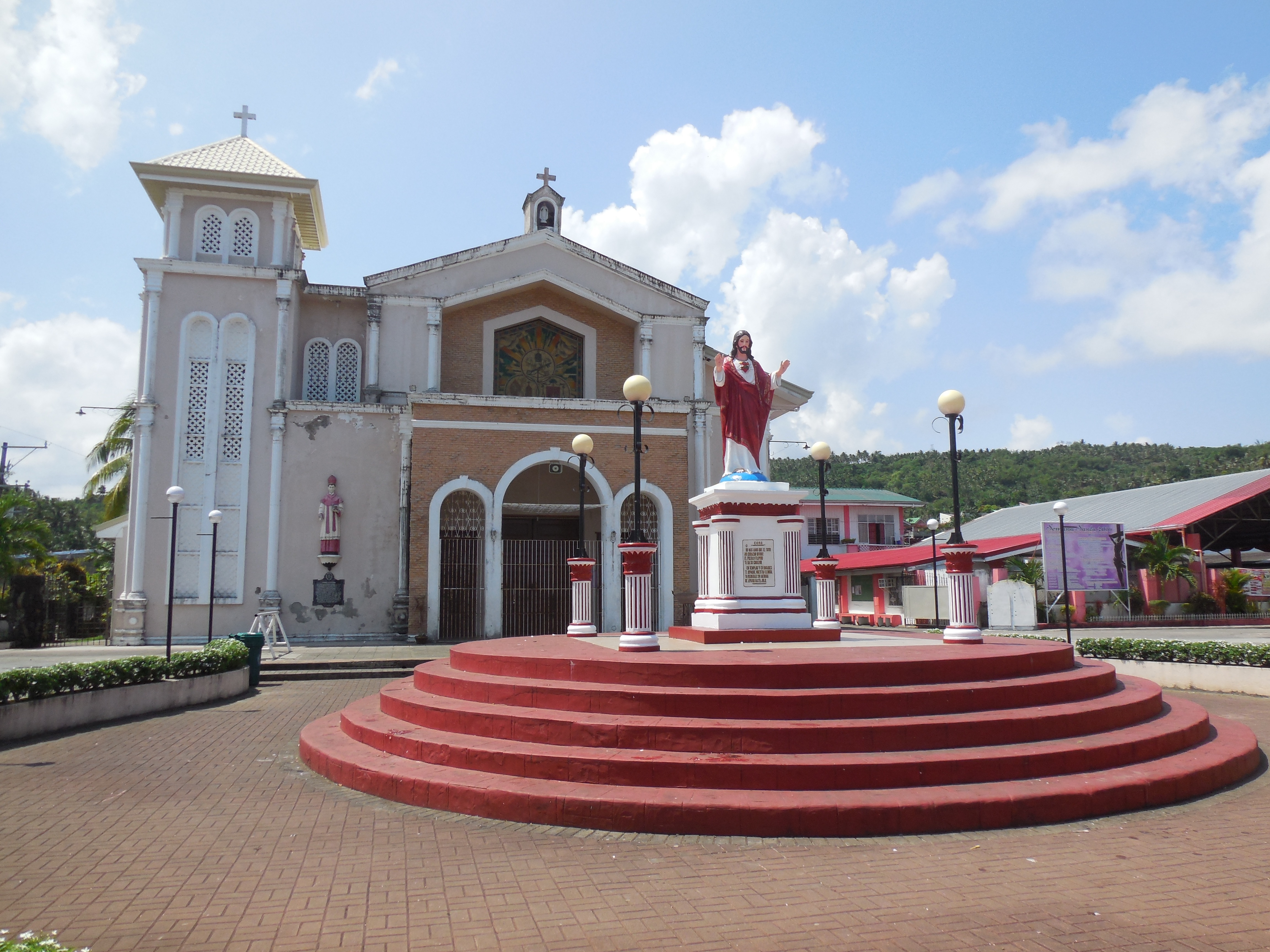
- Saint Bonaventure Parish in 2016

- Location in Luzon Location in the Philippines
- 14°11′25″N 121°43′51″E
- Location: Mauban, Quezon
- Country: Philippines
- Denomination: Roman Catholic

History
- Status: Parish church
- Dedication: Bonaventure

Architecture
- Functional status: Active
- Heritage designation: National Historical Landmark
- Designated: 1939
- Architectural type: Church building
- Completed: 1891; 135 years ago

Administration
- Diocese: Lucena

Saint Bonaventure Parish Church, commonly known as Mauban Church, is a Roman Catholic church located in Mauban, Quezon, Philippines. It is under the jurisdiction of the Diocese of Lucena. The church was first built in 1647, but it was later demolished and rebuilt in 1773. It sustained damage during the 1880 earthquake that struck the town. The present structure was completed in 1891. Saint Bonaventure Parish Church stands in the oldest settlement in the Philippines—and the first in the Philippines and in Asia—placed under the protection of El Seráfico Padre Doctor San Buenaventura as early as 1599. In 1647, an image of Saint Bonaventure was reportedly discovered on a branch of a Malauban tree. In the same year, the parish priest formally recognized San Buenaventura as Patron del Pueblo of Mauban. According to the writings of Fray Huertas, in 1759, an unknown man dressed in the colors of San Buenaventura defended the town from a Moro attack. The people of Mauban have since regarded this event as a miracle attributed to their Santo Patron. The largest bell in Mauban, recast in 1843, is named after San Buenaventura and is rung during the Consecration, Angelus, and Plegaria. The church was solemnly dedicated on April 25, 1996, during a celebration of the Holy Eucharist presided over by Ruben T. Profugo, then Bishop of Lucena.

The National Historical Commission of the Philippines declared the church a national historical landmark in 1939.

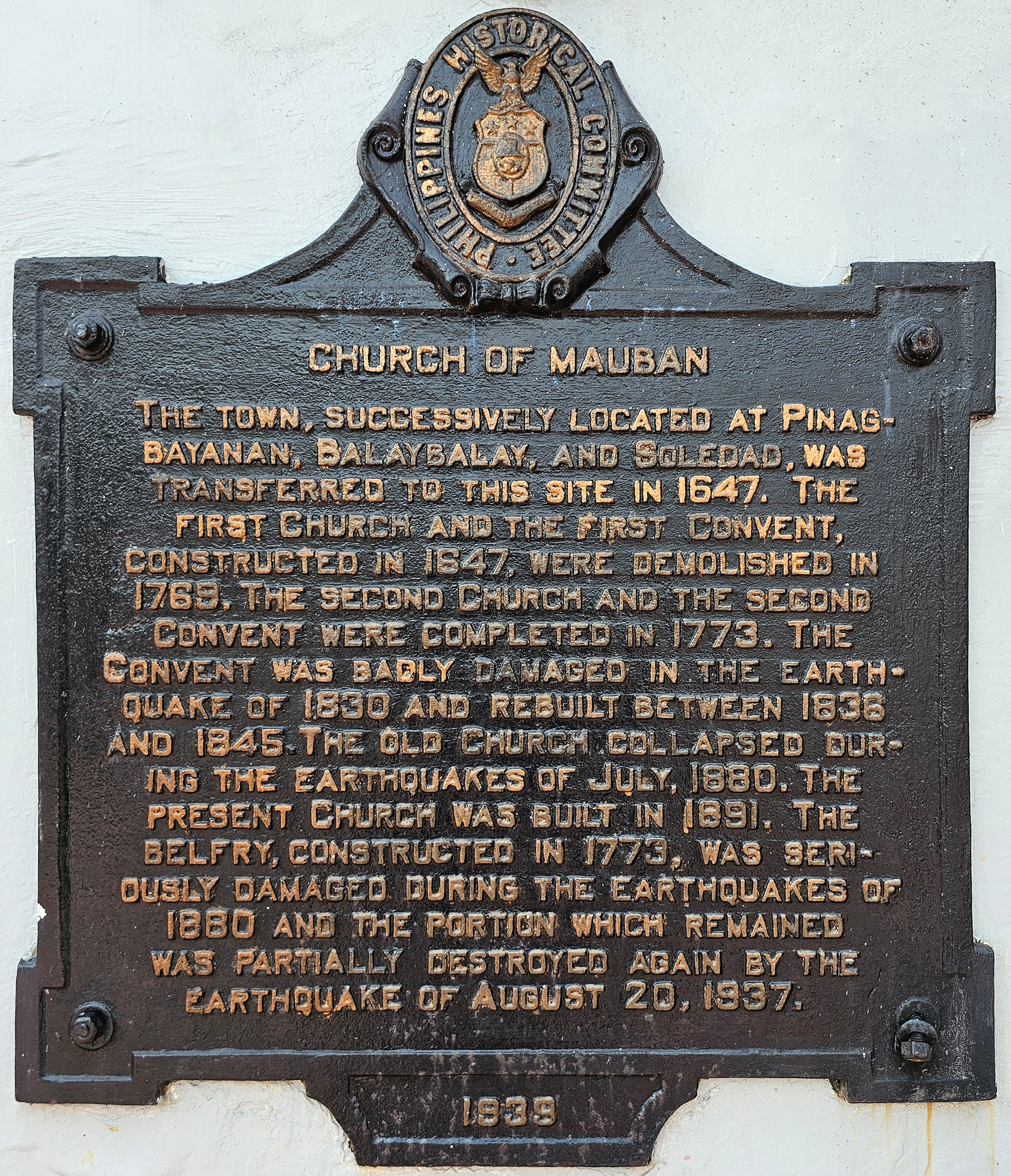
Church PHC historical marker installed in 1939
