= Nuestra Señora de los Remedios Parish =

Roman Catholic church in Zamboanga Sibugay, Philippines

- Location in Mindanao Location in the Philippines
- 7°18′34″N 122°50′36″E
- Location: Solar, Olutanga Island, Zamboanga Sibugay
- Country: Philippines
- Denomination: Roman Catholic

History
- Status: Parish church

Architecture
- Functional status: Active
- Architectural type: Church building

Administration
- Archdiocese: Zamboanga
- Diocese: Ipil

Nuestra Señora de los Remedios Parish is a Roman Catholic parish church situated in Solar, Olutanga Island, Zamboanga Sibugay, Mindanao, Philippines. The parish has 32 chapels; some of these are located in Muslim dominated areas.

Nuestra Señora de los Remedios Parish began as a Jesuit mission in 1950 when Fr. Raimundo Argarate, SJ, came to the island and established basic ecclesiastical communities. The statue of the patroness of the parish was donated by the Miranda family.

In 2005, the pastoral care of the Nuestra Señora de los Remedios was turned over to the Divine Word Missionaries or the SVD. Fr. Roger Alasan, SVD, became its first SVD parish priest.

== Sources ==
- Witness to the Word, Logos Publications, 2009.
- NSDR 50th Anniversary, n. p., 2003.
