= Cavinti Church =

Roman Catholic church in Laguna, Philippines

- Transfiguration of Our Lord Parish Church
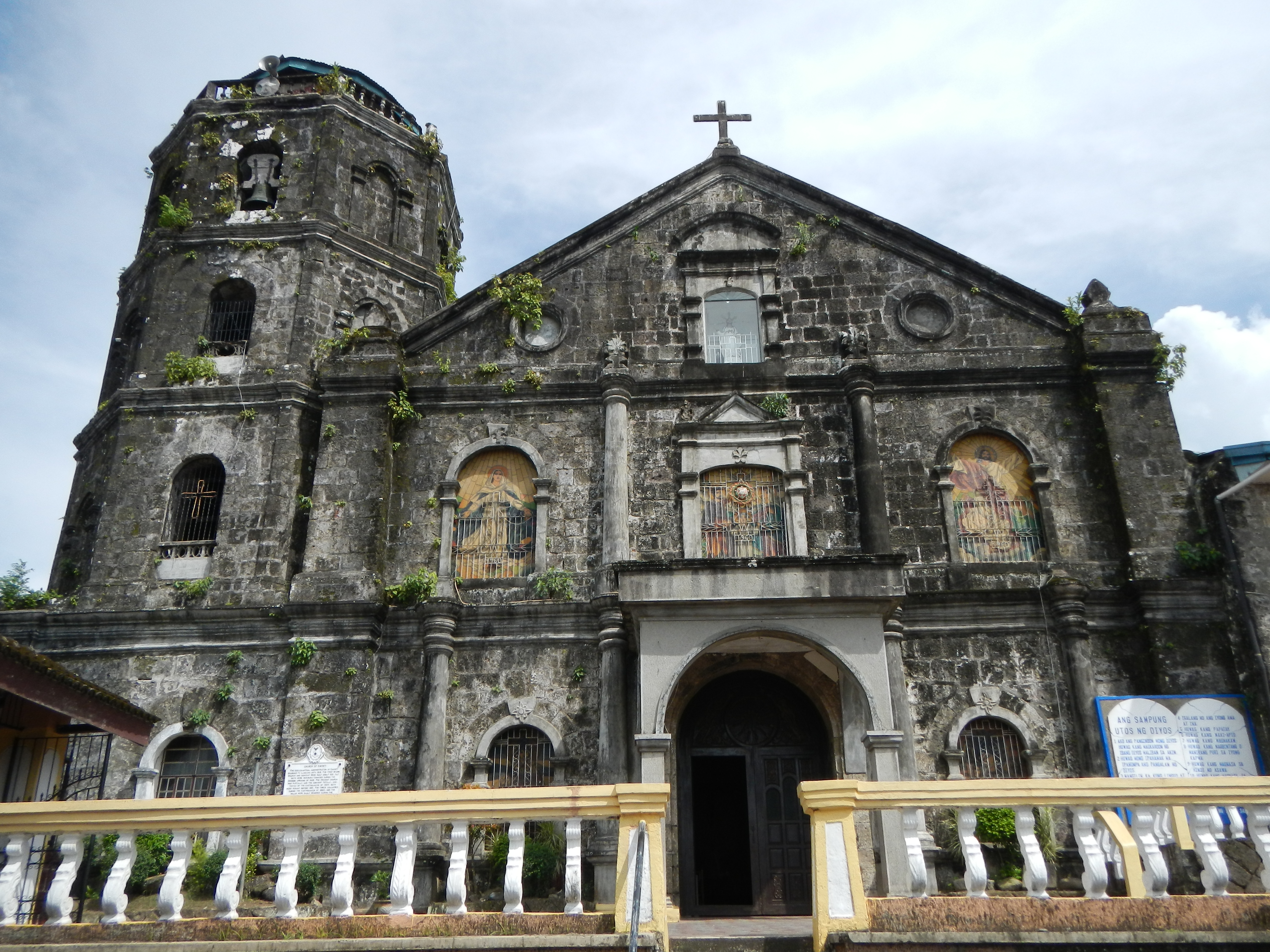
- Church facade in 2013

- Location in Laguna Location in Luzon Location in the Philippines
- 14°14′42″N 121°30′27″E
- Location: Cavinti, Laguna
- Country: Philippines
- Denomination: Roman Catholic

History
- Status: Parish church
- Founded: 1619

Architecture
- Functional status: Active
- Architectural type: Church building

Specifications
- Materials: Adobe

Administration
- Province: Manila
- Metropolis: Manila
- Archdiocese: Manila
- Diocese: San Pablo
- Deanery: Our Lady of Guadalupe

Clergy
- Priest: Armin G. Genota

The Transfiguration of Our Lord Parish Church is the only Roman Catholic church in Cavinti, Laguna, Philippines. It is under the jurisdiction of the Diocese of San Pablo. Its titular patron is Señor del Trasfiguracion or commonly known as El Salvador del Mundo (Divine Savior of the World) whose feast day is celebrated every August 6. The Our Lady of Snows (Nuestra Señora de las Nieves) and Saint Joseph, husband of Mary served as the town's secondary patrons.

== History ==
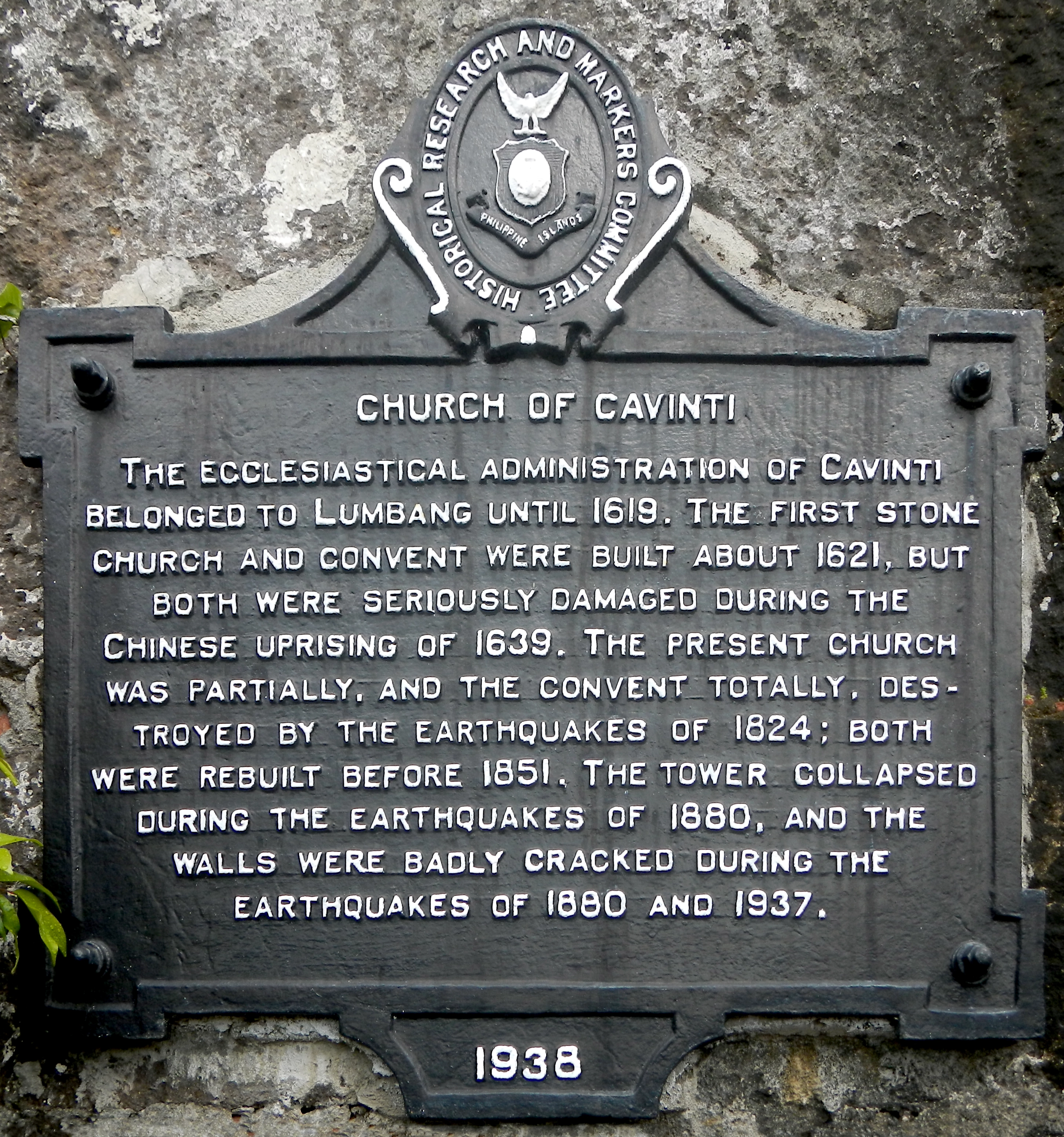
Church HRMC historical marker installed in 1938

Cavinti was part of the ecclesiastical administration of the town of Lumbang until 1619 with Alonso de Ampudia as parish priest. The first church was made up of temporary materials as the stone version came later. The church was built at an unusual location that had been revealed to two men known as the Puhawan brothers. This legend says that these two brothers were searching for something to eat when they discovered an image of El Salvador at this spot in the early 1600s. When they took the picture to their home in Lumban, in their amazement, they found that the image is lost. They continued to look and were amazed to find the image in exactly the place they first found it. The church of Cavinti now stands on the holy ground where the image was discovered.

The first stone church and convent were built in 1621 under the supervision of Pedro de San Martin, but it was severely damaged during the 1639 Chinese uprising. Cavinti became an independent parish from Lumban in 1819. Three years later a bell tower was started for the church and this was completed by 1831 despite the 1824 earthquake which partially damaged the stone church and totally destroyed the convent. The present church was first built during Manuel Benitez's term in 1834 and was completed by Manuel Gonzalez before 1851.

One of the largest earthquakes in the Philippines, the Luzon earthquake, happened in July 1880. It completely destroyed the church's bell tower and damaged the church walls. Another earthquake in 1937 also damaged the church walls.

== Gallery ==
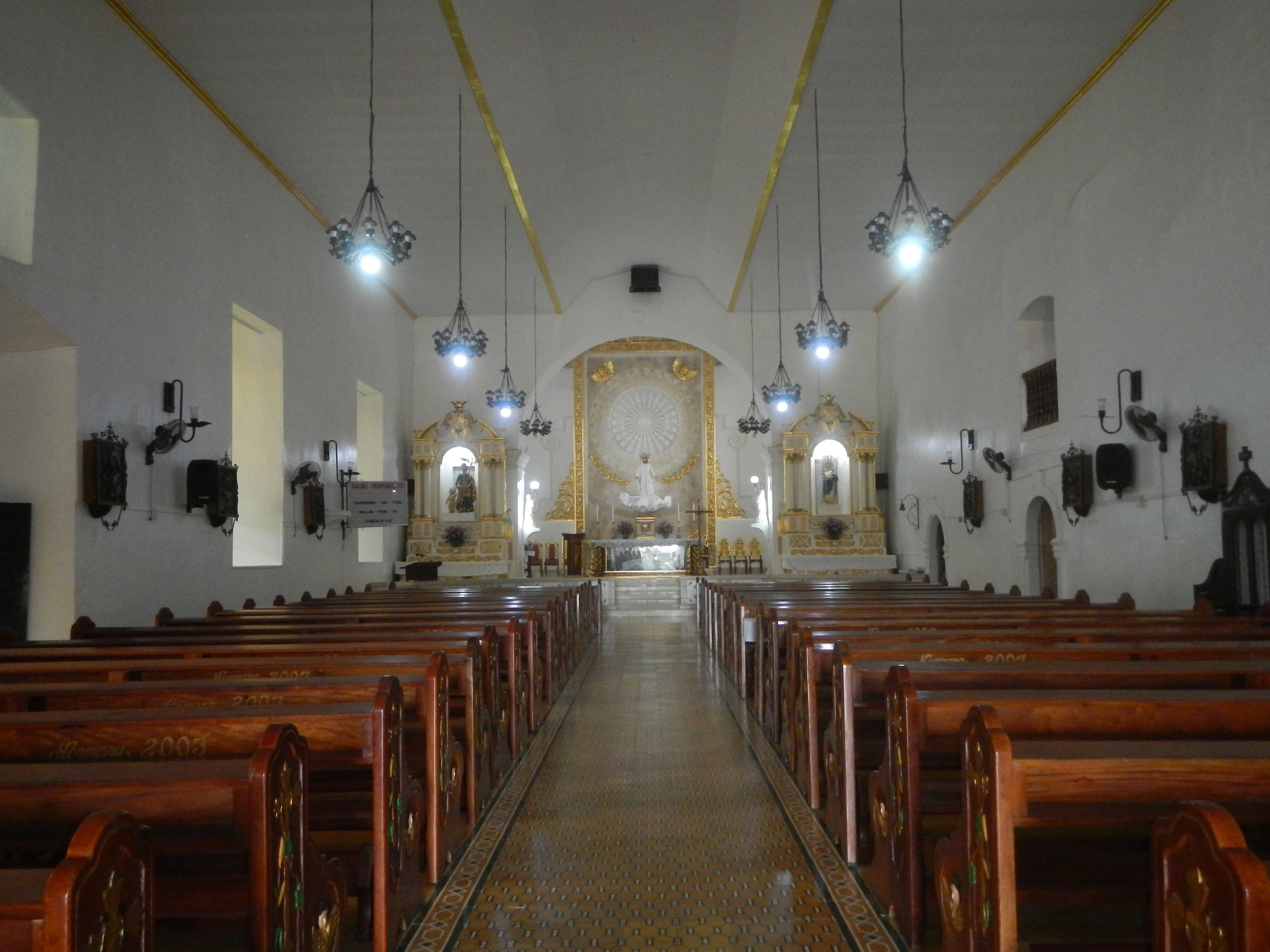
Church interior in 2019

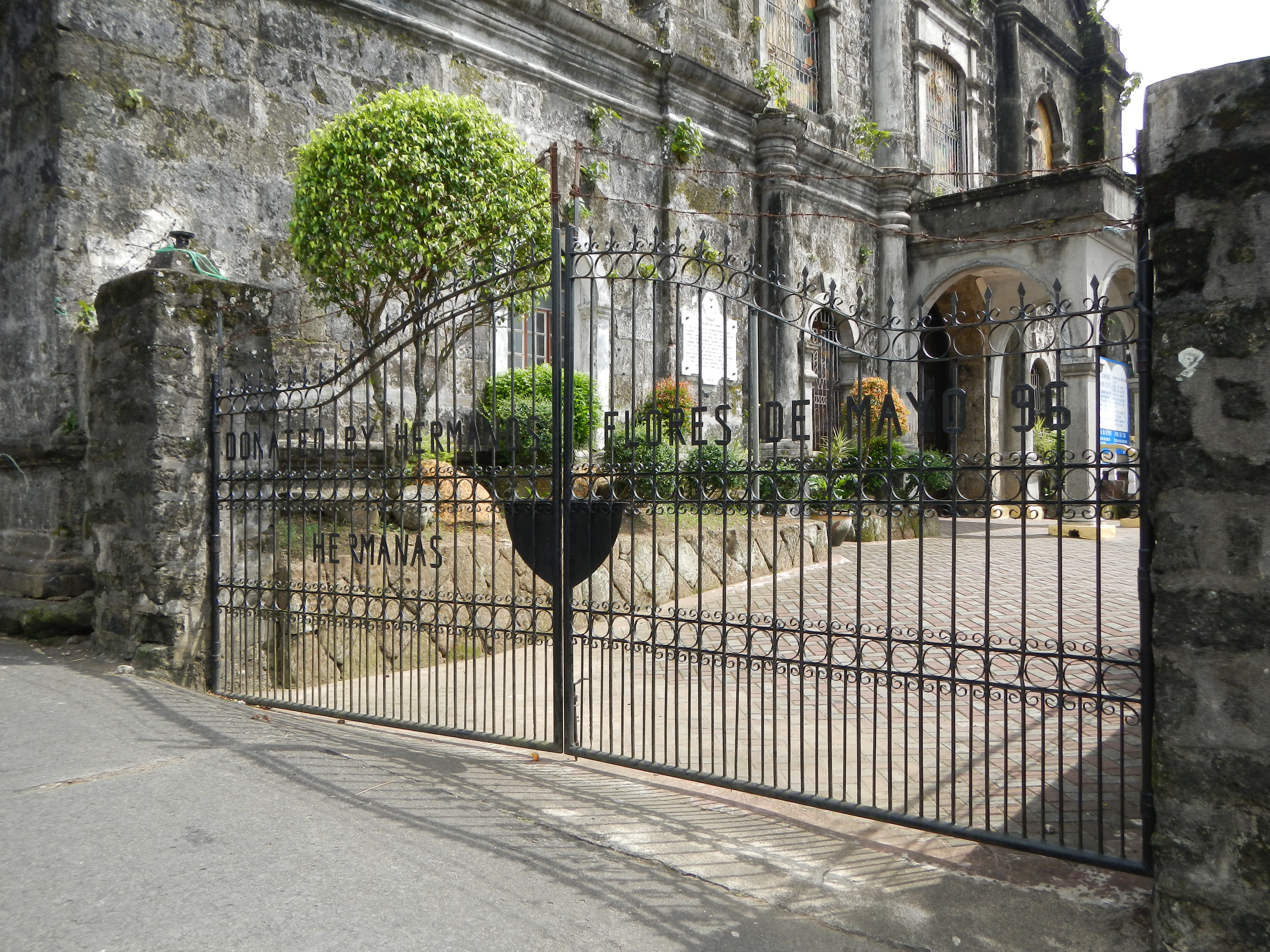
Church gate

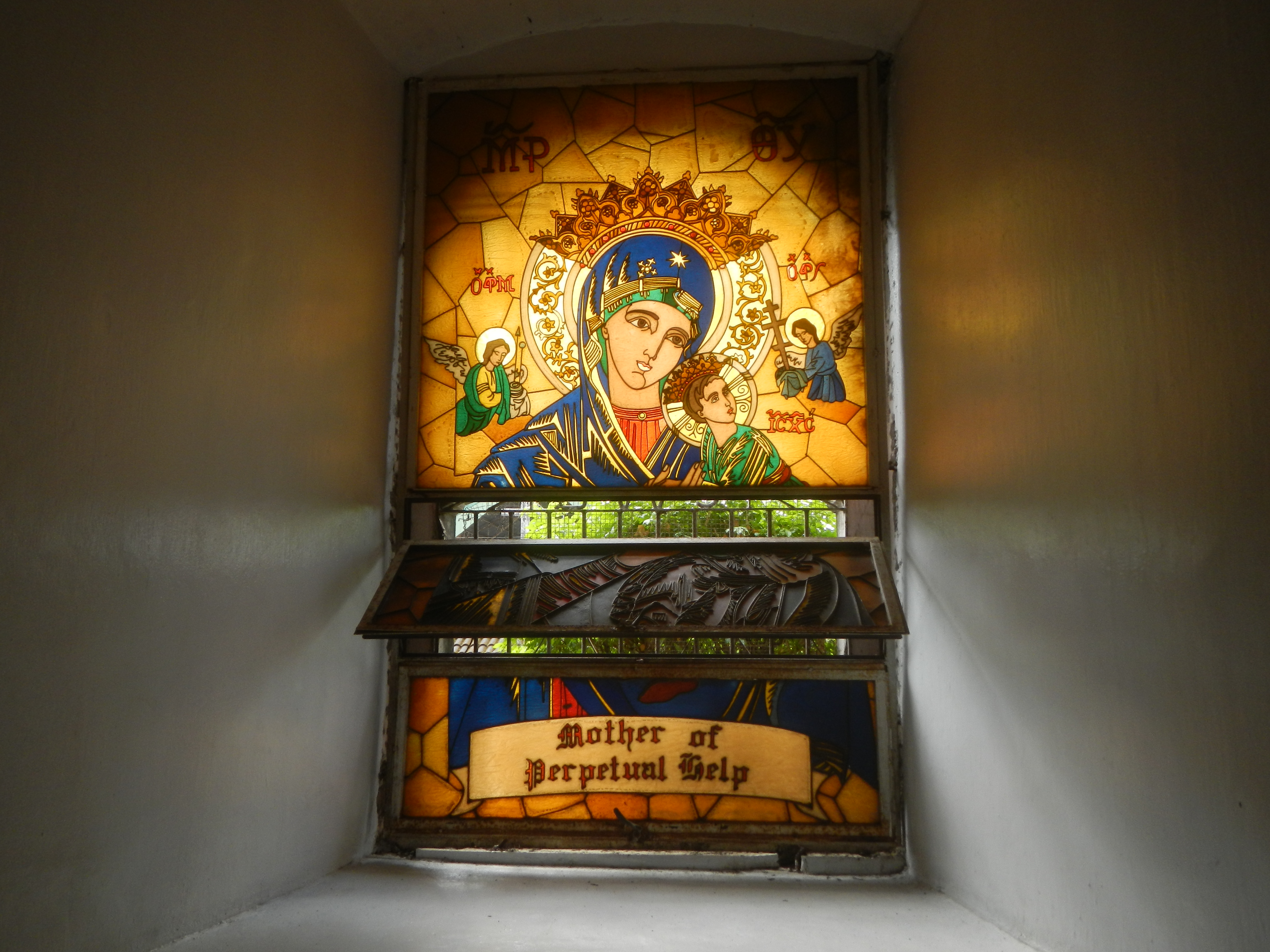
Stained glass window featuring Our Lady of Perpetual Help

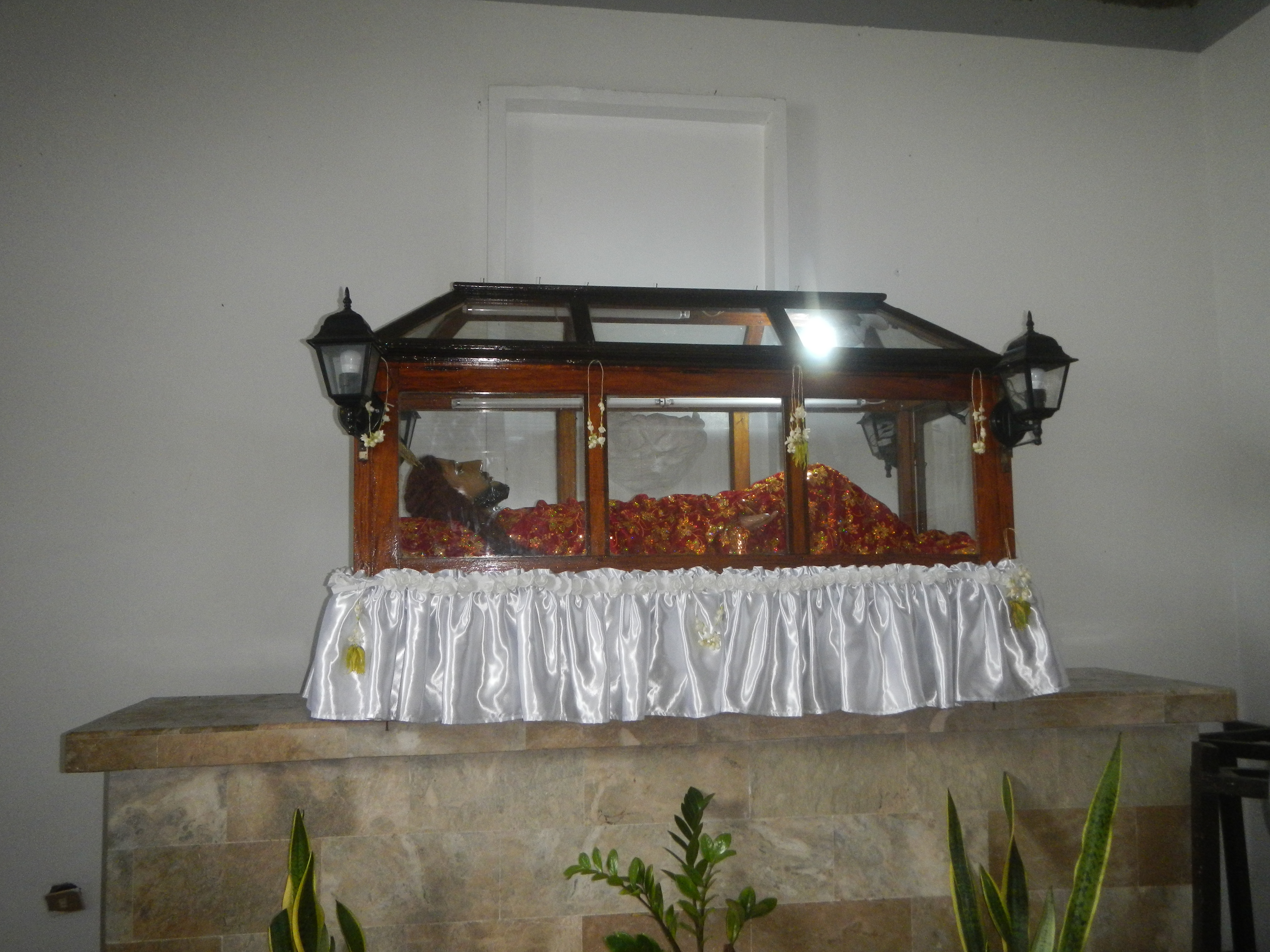
Santo Entierro

== Bibliography ==
- Huerta, Felix de (1865). Estado geográfico, topográfico, estadístico, histórico-religioso. Binondo: Imprenta de M. Sanchez y Ca.
- Historical Markers: Regions I–IV and CAR. Manila: National Historical Institute (Philippines). 1993. p. 46. ISBN 9715380611.
