= Sibonga Church =

Roman Catholic church in Cebu, Philippines

- Our Lady of the Pillar Parish Church
- Nuestra Señora del Pilar de Zaragoza Church; Virgin of the Pillar Parish Church
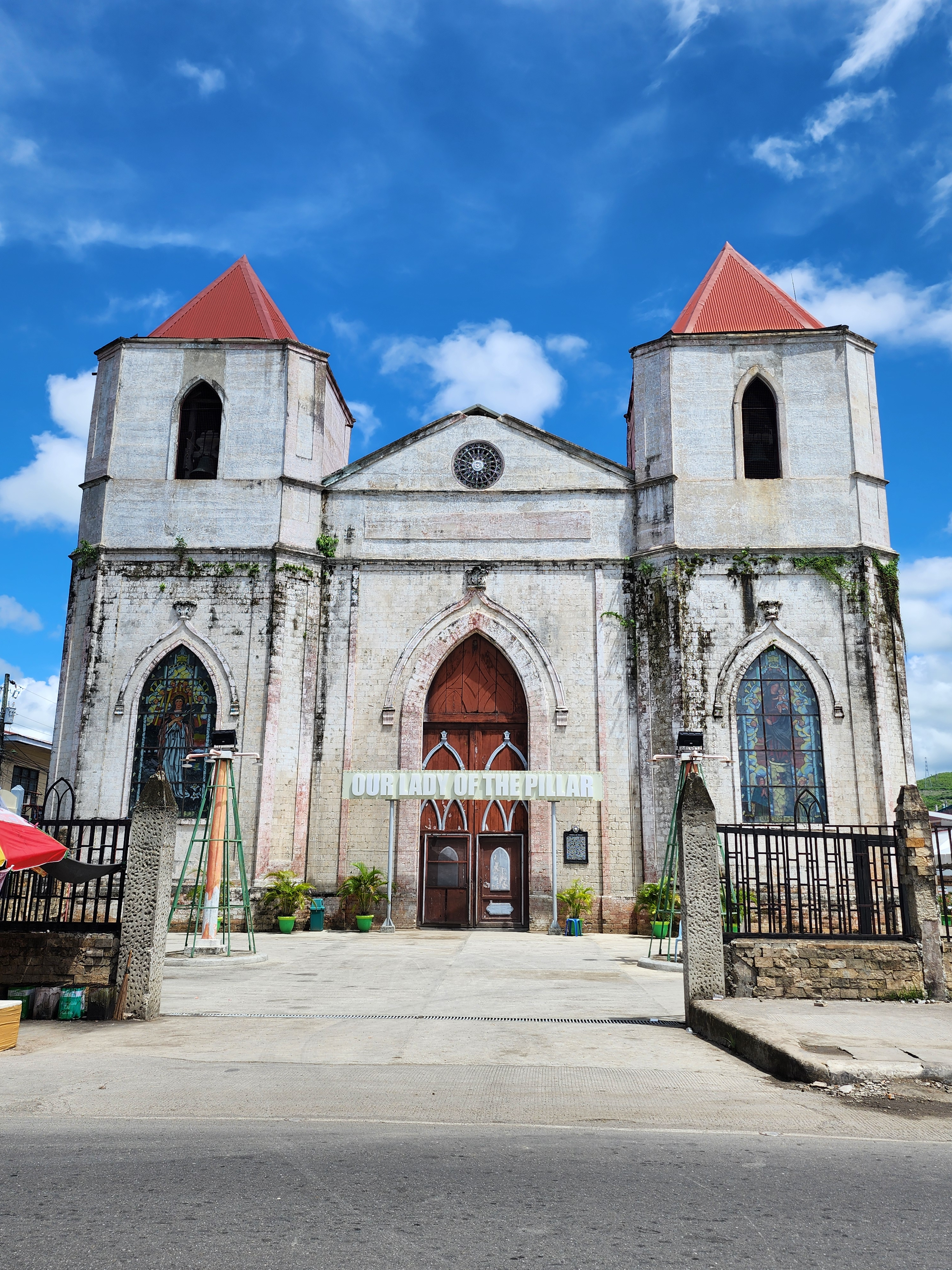
- Church facade in 2024

- Location in Cebu Location in the Visayas Location in the Philippines
- 10°01′01.7″N 123°37′09.3″E
- Location: Sibonga, Cebu
- Country: Philippines
- Denomination: Roman Catholic

History
- Dedication: Our Lady of the Pillar
- Dedicated: 1830

Architecture
- Architectural type: Church building
- Style: Neo-Gothic
- Years built: 1866–1898

Administration
- Archdiocese: Cebu
- Deanery: San Antonio de Padua
- Parish: Our Lady of the Pillar

Clergy
- Priest: Fr. Agustin Abella

Our Lady of the Pillar Parish Church, also known as the Virgin of the Pillar Parish Church or simply Sibonga Church, is a Roman Catholic church in Sibonga, Cebu, Philippines. It is under the jurisdiction of the Archdiocese of Cebu.

== Background ==
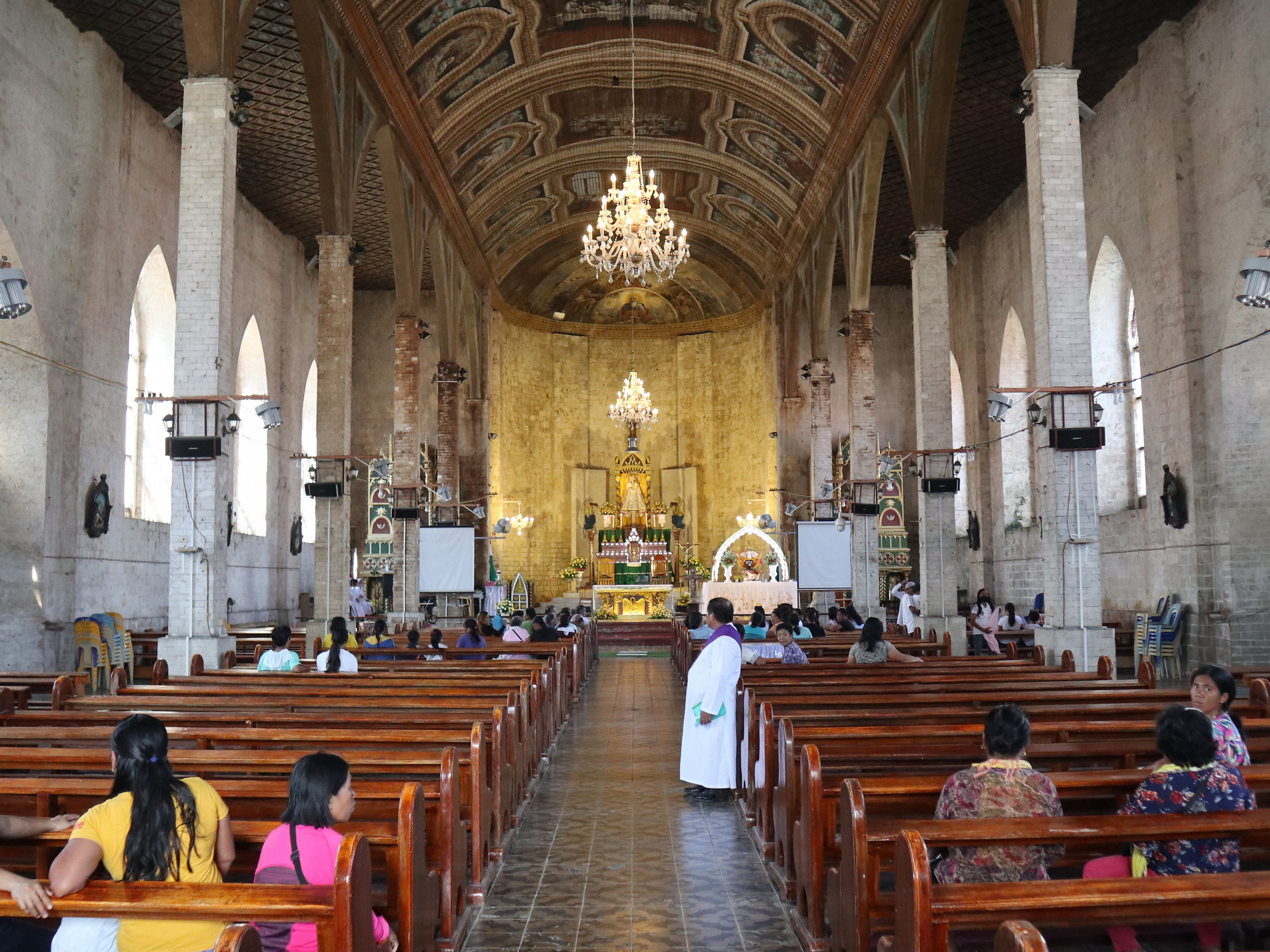
Church interior in 2023

The church was established as a visita of Carcar in 1690 by the Augustinians. The site became a parish dedicated to the Our Lady of the Pillar of Zaragoza in 1830 with the initial church building made in wood. A convent made in stone and coral was built according to the design of Bishop Santos Gómez Marañón of Cebu under the watch of Fr. Prospero Puerto in 1939. The current church building made in stone and coral was built from 1866 to 1898. The building is an example of Neo-Gothic architecture

The church building was renovated under Fr. Francisco Latorre and was inaugurated on November 17, 1907, by Manila Archbishop Jeremiah Harty.

The Sibonga Church is also noted for its interior artworks, especially its ceiling mural. Parish priest Julio Fernandez commissioned Cebuano artist Raymundo Francia who accomplished the artworks from 1927 to 1931. Francia's ceiling mural is noted by the historical marker at the church to be an example of trompe-l'œil.

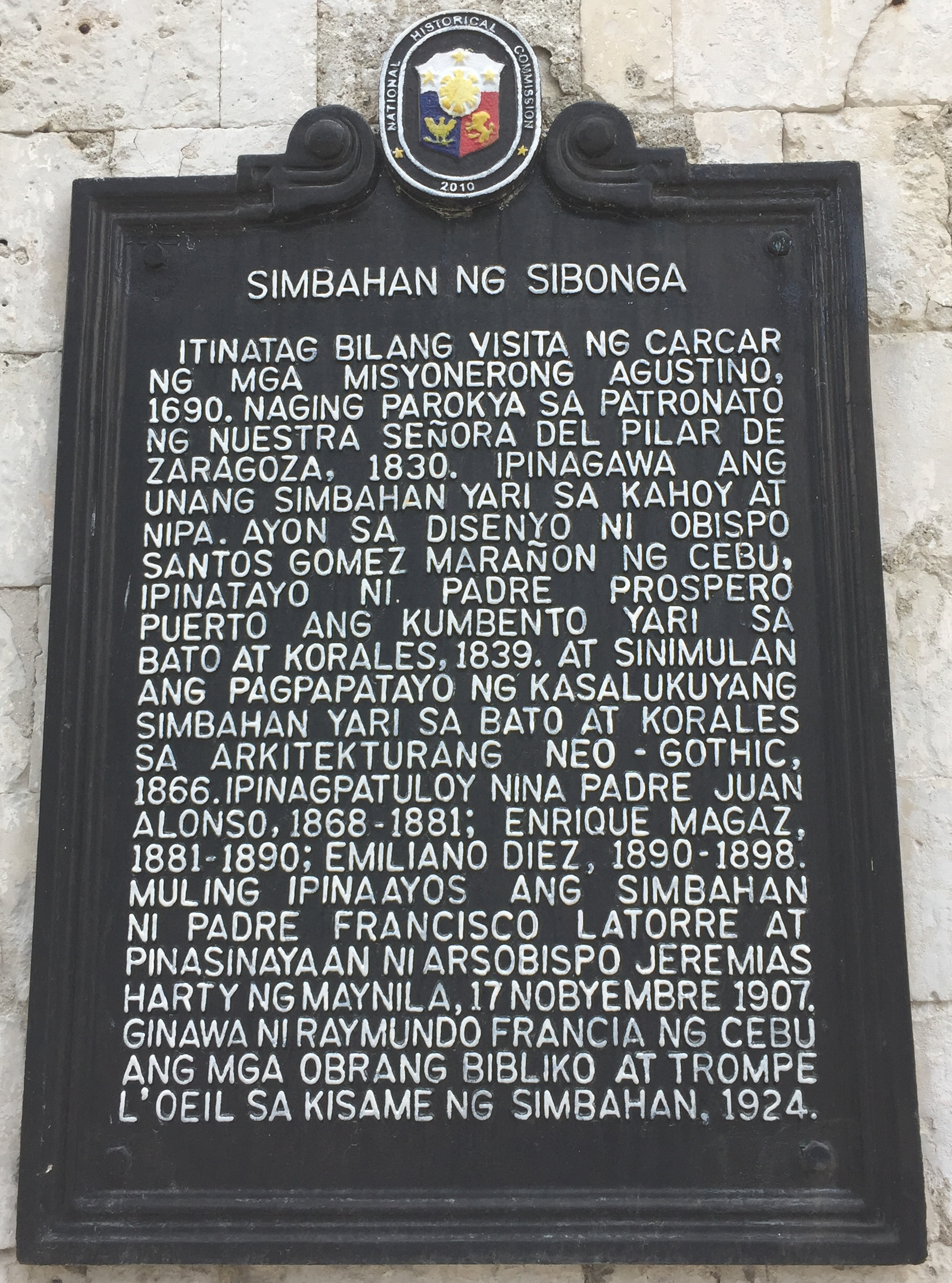
Church NHC historical marker installed in 2010

A historical marker was unveiled at Sibonga Church on December 2, 2010, by the National Historical Commission of the Philippines. It is recognized as a Level II historical site.

In May 2024, the Cebu Archdiocesan Commission for the Cultural Heritage of the Church requested the removal of the red-colored light-emitting diode signage installed at the Porta Sancta entrance. The Commission said that the NHCP did not approve the same which is incompatible with the church's “historic and heritage value.”
