= Saint Anne Parish Church (Pagbilao) =

Roman Catholic church in Quezon, Philippines

Saint Anne Parish and Diocesan Shrine
- St. Anne Parish
- Parokya at Dambana ni Santa Ana (Filipino)

- Location in Luzon Location in the Philippines
- 13°58′50″N 121°47′22″E
- Location: Sitio Santa Ana, Brgy. Silangang Malicboy, Pagbilao, Quezon
- Country: Philippines
- Denomination: Roman Catholic

History
- Status: Parish & Diocesan Shrine
- Founded: 1908
- Founder: "Grupo" (1st Ermita)
- Dedication: St. Anne
- Dedicated: March 17, 1958
- Consecrated: July 15, 2000
- Events: Sayaw Parangal Kay Sta. Ana (Street Dancing)

Architecture
- Functional status: Active
- Architectural type: Church building
- Groundbreaking: July 2, 1960
- Completed: July 15, 2000

Specifications
- Capacity: 470

Administration
- Province: Quezon
- Archdiocese: Lipa
- Diocese: Lucena
- Parish: St. Anne Parish

Clergy
- Archbishop: Most Rev. Gilbert A. Garcera, D.D.
- Bishop(s): Most Rev. Emilio Z. Marquez, D.D
- Rector: Rev. Fr. Severino Hernandez
- Priest: Rev. Fr. Severino Hernandez

Saint Anne Parish and Diocesan Shrine, also known as Saint Anne Parish, is a Roman Catholic church located in Silangang Malicboy in the municipality of Pagbilao, Quezon, Philippines. It is under the jurisdiction of the Diocese of Lucena. The parish's patroness is Saint Anne.

== Features ==
=== Facade ===
The Stained glass in the front of the church symbolizes the motherhood of St. Anne to Mary, and to the whole of Malicboy.

=== Candle park and garden ===
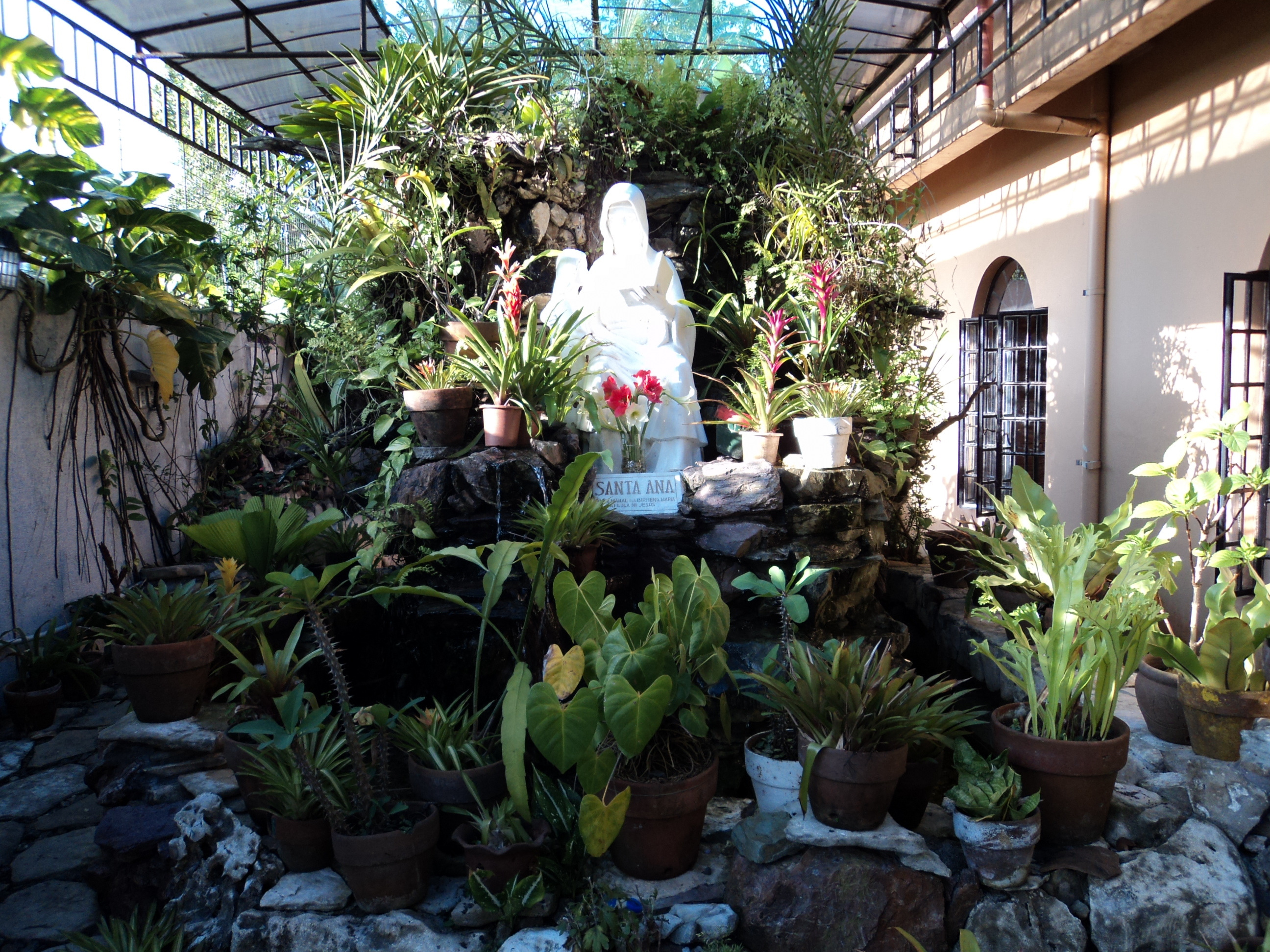
Garden of St. Anne Parish

Constructed in 2000, the Candle Park and Garden is one of the places of meditation for devotees and parishioners of St. Anne. People may light their candles and wish to St. Anne. There are different sites for meditation in the garden, including sites for the sick people, people who want to have children, etc.

== Administration ==
St. Anne Parish and Diocesan Shrine is in the jurisdiction of the Vicariate of St. Andrew in the District of St. Matthew of the Diocese of Lucena.

== Bibliography ==
- Tolentino, Raphael (2007). Recuerdo (in Tagalog).
- Tolentino, Raphael (2007). St.Anne Parish and Diocesan Shrine (in Tagalog).
- Tolentino, Raphael (2007). larawAnne (in Tagalog).
- Tolentino, Raphael (2007). Golden Jubilee Celebration (in Tagalog).
- Mula sa Dangal At Pag-Asa (in Tagalog). 1983.
- Desrochers, Gerard. Sainte Anne's Prayer Book.
