= Bangar Church =

Roman Catholic church in La Union, Philippines

- Saint Christopher Parish Church
- Parokya ni San Cristobal (Filipino)
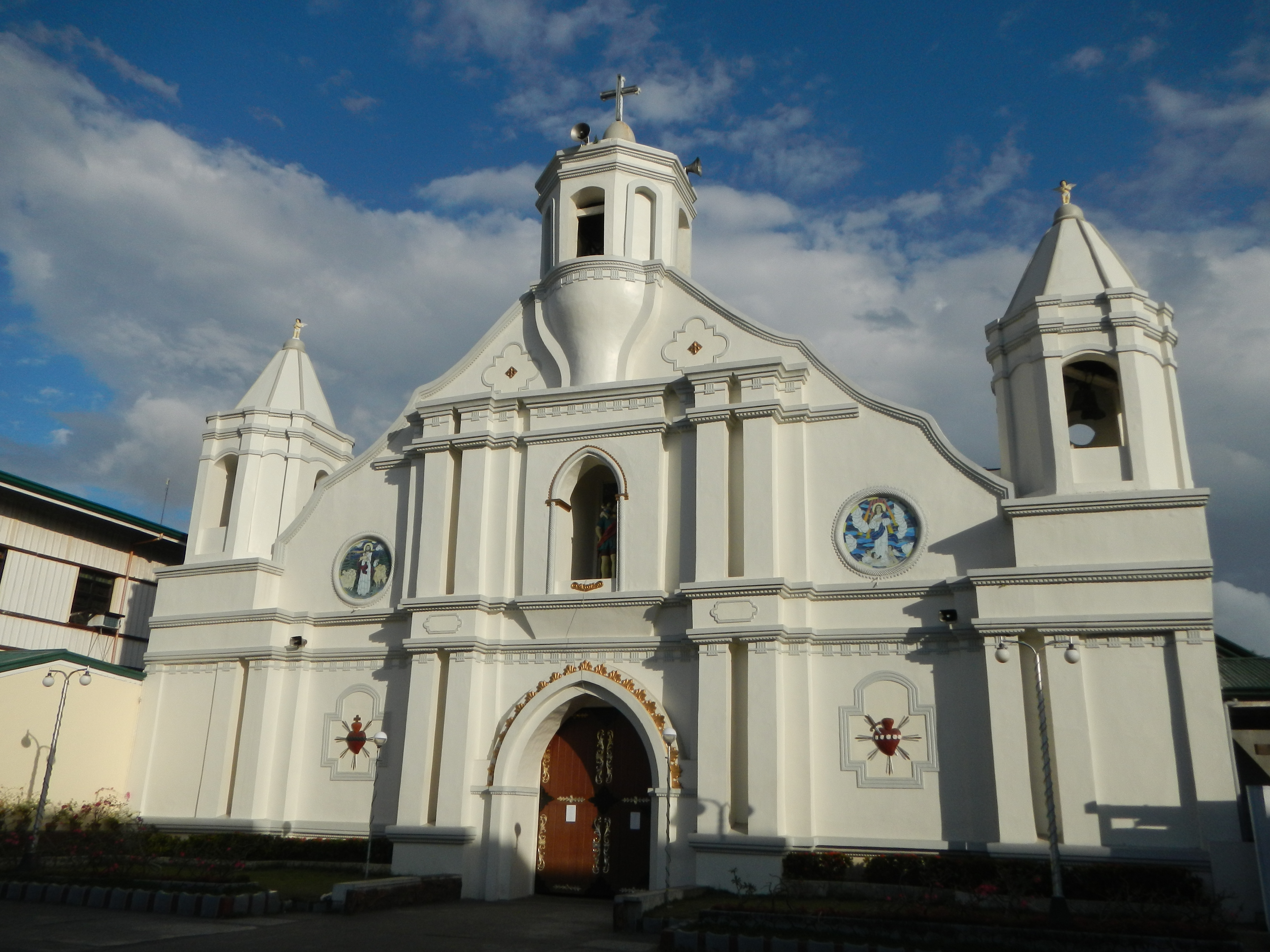
- Church facade in 2013

- Location in Luzon Location in the Philippines
- 16°53′35″N 120°25′27″E
- Location: Poblacion, Bangar, La Union
- Country: Philippines
- Denomination: Roman Catholic

History
- Status: Parish church
- Dedication: Saint Christopher

Architecture
- Functional status: Active
- Architectural type: Church building
- Style: Baroque
- Completed: 1689

Administration
- Archdiocese: Lingayen-Dagupan
- Diocese: San Fernando de La Union

Clergy
- Archbishop: Socrates B. Villegas
- Bishop: Daniel O. Presto

Saint Christopher Parish Church, commonly known as Bangar Church, is a Roman Catholic church located in Bangar, La Union, Philippines, under the jurisdiction of the Diocese of San Fernando de La Union. The church is placed under the advocacy of Saint Christopher.

== History ==
Bangar was formerly a visita of Tagudin. The first church was built by Father Francisco Albear when Bangar was still a visita of Tagudin. A church made of stone and molave on a floor made of lime and pebbles, and roof of split bamboo was completed by Father Albear in 1689. Bangar became an independent parish on 1700 with Saint Christopher as its patron saint. The first parish priest of Bangar, Father Agustin Ancheta was assigned to the parish in 1708. Father Evaristo Guadalupe built a new convent in 1866 and completed in 1878.

== Architecture ==
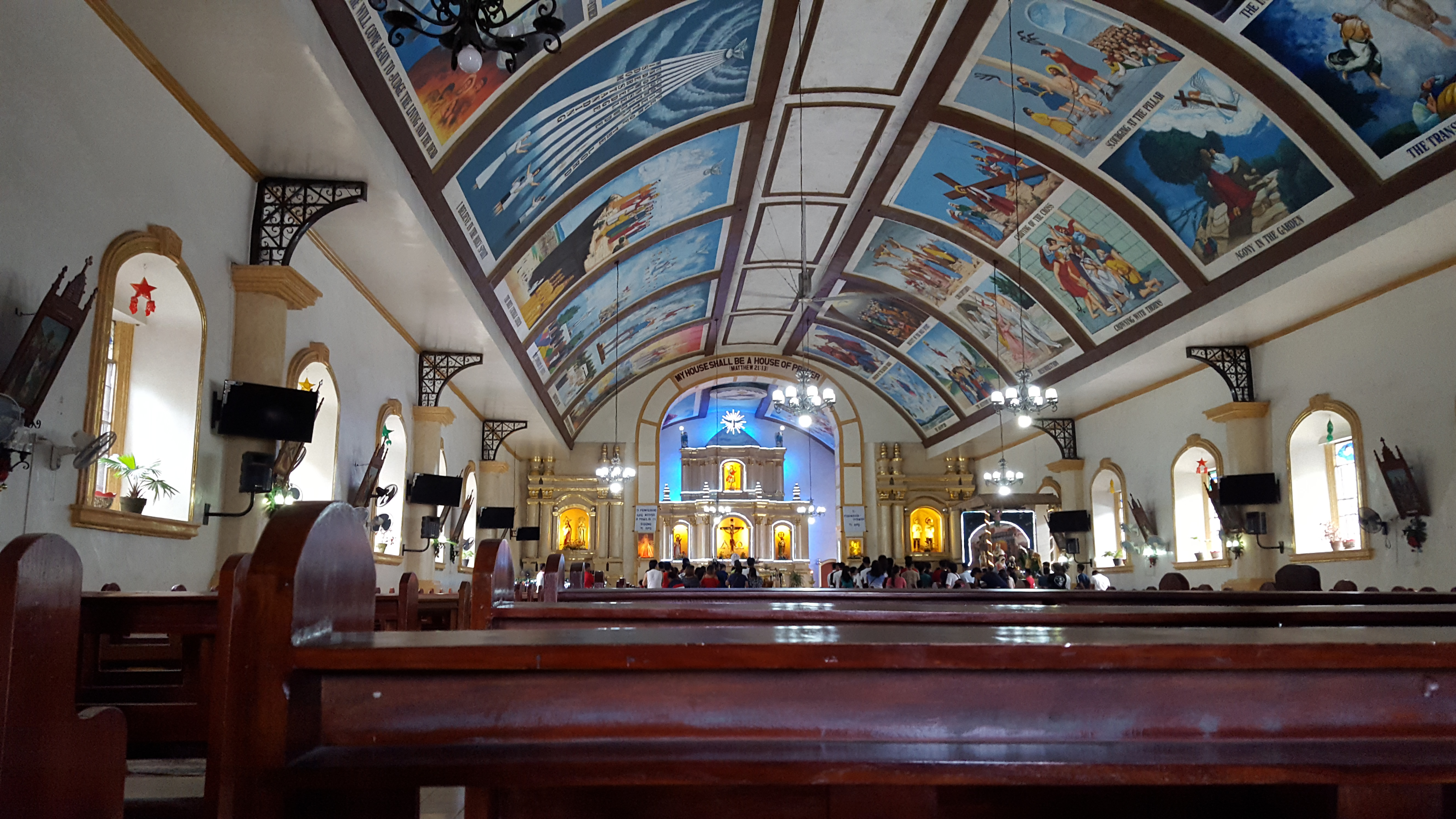
Church interior in 2018

The church is a mix of Baroque architecture with Neoclassical features. Its facade has a mixture of Baroque, Gothic and Moorish embellishments. The Gothic features are present on the lancet-arched doorway and the choir loft windows; Renaissance features on the scallops framing the pediment; and Moorish features on the twin bell towers on the facade and another campanile on top of the pediment. It is the only church in Northern Luzon and possibly on the entire Philippines to have three bell towers.

In 2003, the ceiling was renovated and mural paintings were painted on the ceilings.

== Bibliography ==
- Dela Torre, Visitacion (2006). The Ilocos Heritage. Makati: Tower Book House. ISBN 978-971-91030-9-7.
