= St. Vincent Ferrer Parish Church (Odiongan) =

Roman Catholic church in Romblon, Philippines

Saint Vincent Ferrer Parish Church
- Diocesan Shrine and Parish of Saint Vincent Ferrer
- Parokya ni San Vicente Ferrer (Filipino)
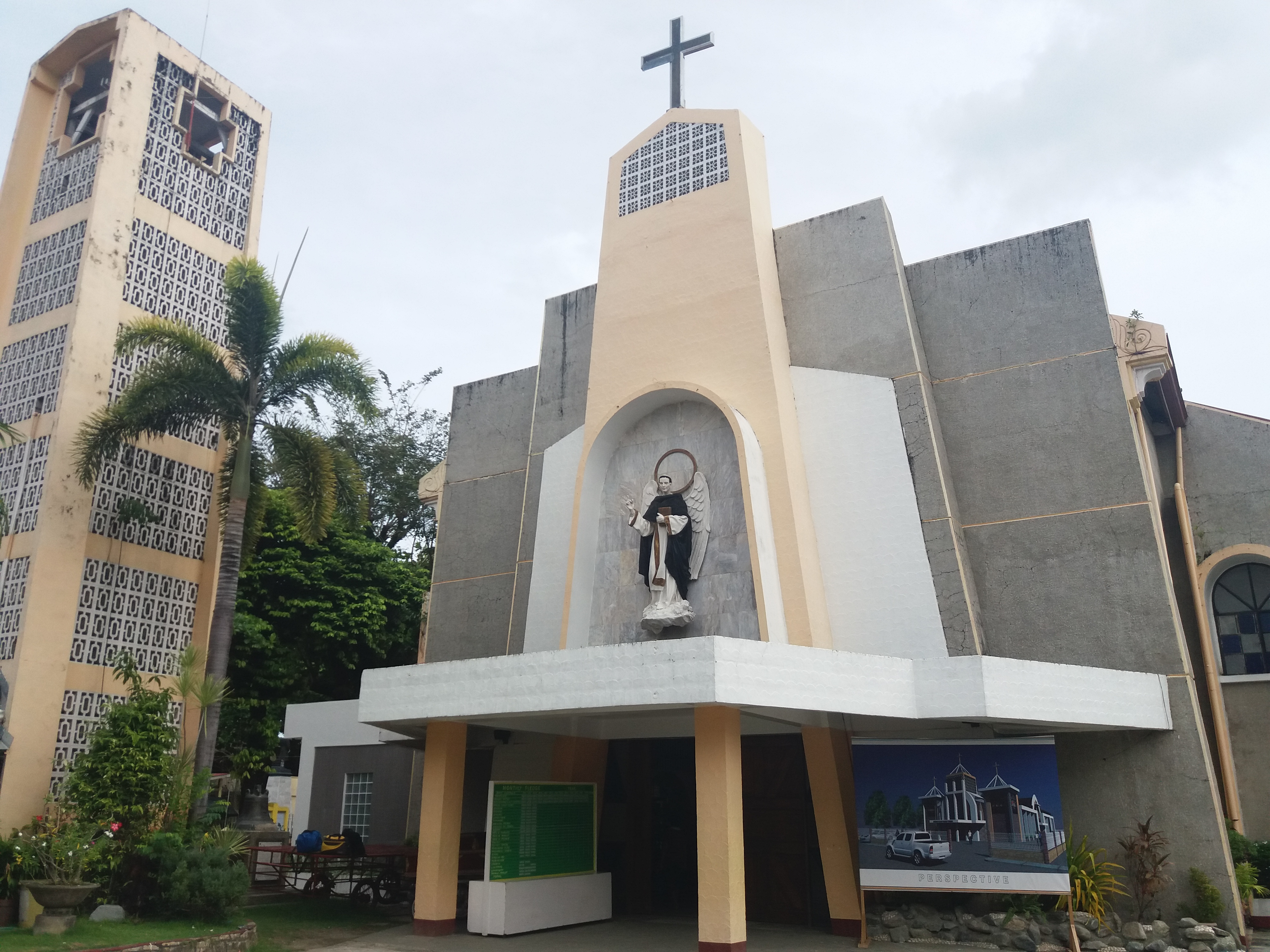
- Church facade in 2017

- Location within Luzon Location within Philippines
- 12°24′00″N 121°58′56″E
- Location: Odiongan, Romblon, Philippines
- Denomination: Roman Catholic

History
- Status: Parish Church
- Dedication: Saint Vincent Ferrer

Architecture
- Functional status: active
- Architectural type: Church building

Specifications
- Materials: hollow blocks, pebble

Administration
- District: Diocese of Romblon

The Diocesan Shrine and Parish of Saint Vincent Ferrer, also known as Saint Vincent Ferrer Parish Church, is the Roman Catholic parish church of Odiongan in Romblon in the Philippines. It falls under the jurisdiction of the Diocese of Romblon which in turn falls under the Archdiocese of Capiz. The church is located in Poblacion, the central town of the said municipality. The Church has a separate bell tower. It has porte-cochère with the statue of St. Vincent above but attached to the front outer wall of the church and is lit at night.

== History ==
One night in March 1888, the whole town of Odiongan including the church and the convent was set ablaze. The old remnant bell of the original church is said to have saved the town and the people. The bell was rung to wake up sleeping citizens and for them to evacuate. The bell was kept in casa tribunal (court house) and was recovered later on by Rev. Fr. Antonio Villar and was returned to the Catholic Church in 1970. The Church was renovated on April 15, 1985, through the efforts of the parishioners. It was inaugurated during the pontificate of John Paul II and blessed by The Most Reverend Nicolas Mondejar, Bishop of Romblon, on April 5, 1988.

== Parish priests ==
The parish priests who took charge of the parish of St. Vincent Ferrer were recorded by Mateo Meñez, chronicler of Odiongan, and was revised by Judge Silvino Cabrera, Sr.

Period	Parish priest
1810 - 1840	none
1840 - 1841	Fray (Father) Jose Aznar de los Dolores
1841 - 1858	The Parish was visited by priests from the Parish of Banton
1858 - 1862	Rev. Fr. Pedro de San Nicolas Tolentino
1862 - 1863	Rev. Fr. Mateo Bernard
1863 - 1865	Rev. Fr. Eladio Lagonio
1865 - 1867	Rev. Fr. Ignacio Noguerrar
1867 - 1869	Rev. Fr. Juan Boguing
1869 - 1875	Rev. Fr. Jacinto Ferrez
1875 - 1881	Rev. Fr. Pedro Moro
1881 - 1885	Rev. Fr. Blas Martinez
1885 - 1890	Rev. Fr. Miguel Galan
1890 - 1894	Rev. Fr. Blas Martinez
1894 - 1905	Rev. Fr. Agustin Ferrez
1906 - 1934	vacant
1934 - 1939	Rev. Fr. Laureano Ureta
1939 - 1941	Rev. Fr. Francisco Padios
1941 - 1946	Rev. Fr. Salvador Mabasa
1946 - 1948	Rev. Fr. Celso Pasadero
1948 - 1951	Rev. Fr. Federico Velasco
1951 - 1953	Rev. Fr. Sergio Nacionales
1953 - 1957	Rev. Fr. Efren Layson
1957 - 1968	Rev. Fr. Juan Alba
1968 - 1976	Rev. Fr. Antonio Villar
1976 - 1983	Rev. Fr. Manuel de los Santos
1983 - 1998	Monsignor Agustin Gialogo
1998 - 2004	Rev. Fr. Nestor Gadon
2004 - 2009	Rev. Fr. Aristeo Royo
2009 - 2015	Monsignor Nonato Ernie Fetalino
2015 – 18 July 2025	Rev. Fr. John Mary Vianney Parago
18 July 2025 - incumbent	Rev. Fr. Billy V. Gregorio

== See also ==
- Banton Church
