= Baao Church =

Roman Catholic church in Camarines Sur, Philippines

- Saint Bartholomew Parish Church
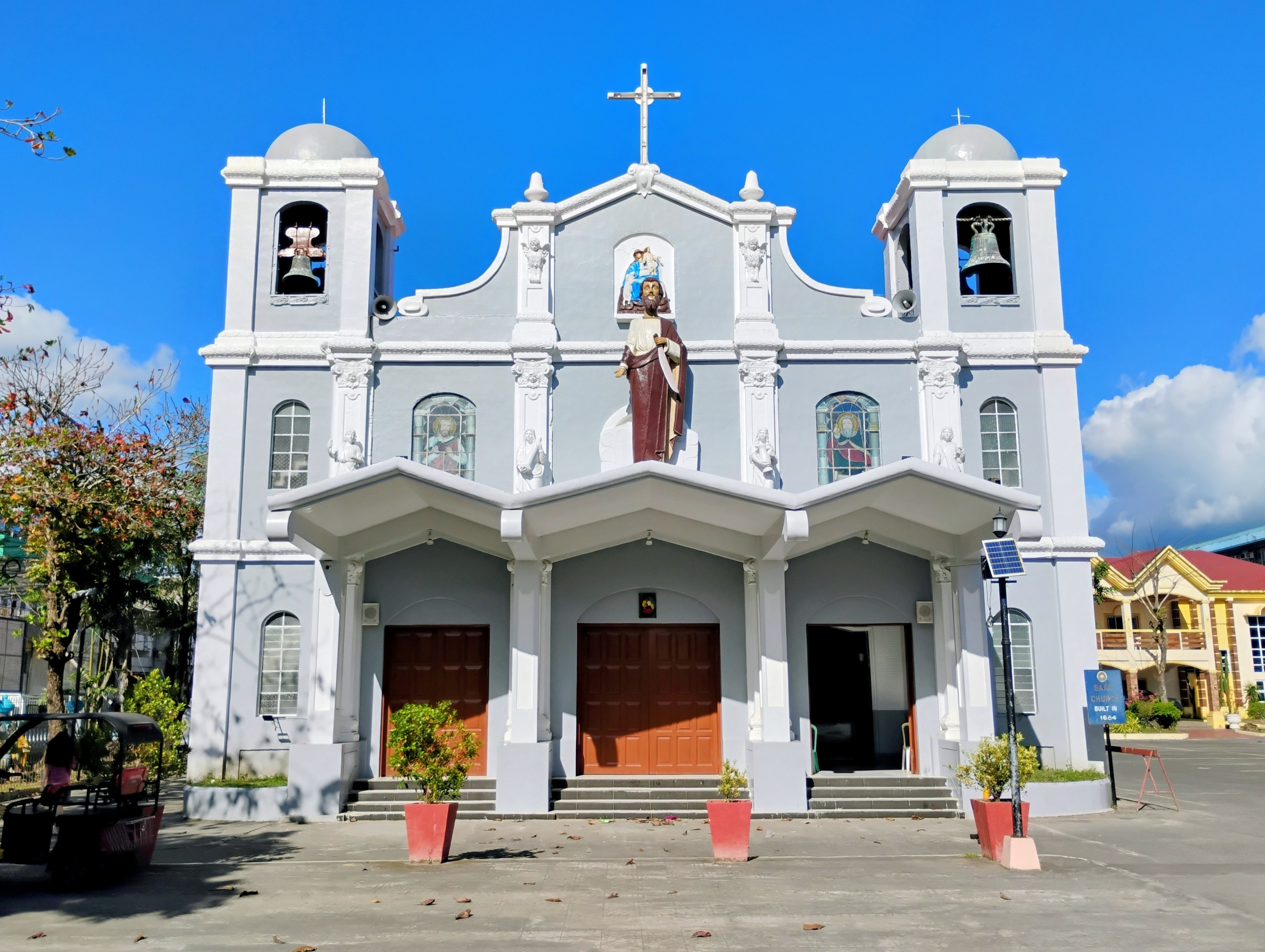
- Church facade in 2026

- Location in Luzon Location in the Philippines
- 13°27′15″N 123°21′59″E
- Location: Baao, Camarines Sur
- Country: Philippines
- Denomination: Roman Catholic

History
- Status: Parish church
- Dedication: Bartholomew the Apostle

Architecture
- Functional status: Active
- Heritage designation: National Historical Landmark
- Designated: 1939
- Architectural type: Church building
- Completed: 1850; 176 years ago

Administration
- Archdiocese: Caceres

Saint Bartholomew Parish Church, commonly known as Baao Church, is a Roman Catholic church located in Baao, Camarines Sur, Philippines. It is under the jurisdiction of the Archdiocese of Caceres.

The first church, which was constructed in 1684, was destroyed by a typhoon in 1706. The second church, erected in 1731, was damaged by an earthquake in 1811. The church's subsequent reconstruction was completed only in 1850.

The National Historical Commission of the Philippines declared it a national historical landmark in 1939.

== Gallery ==
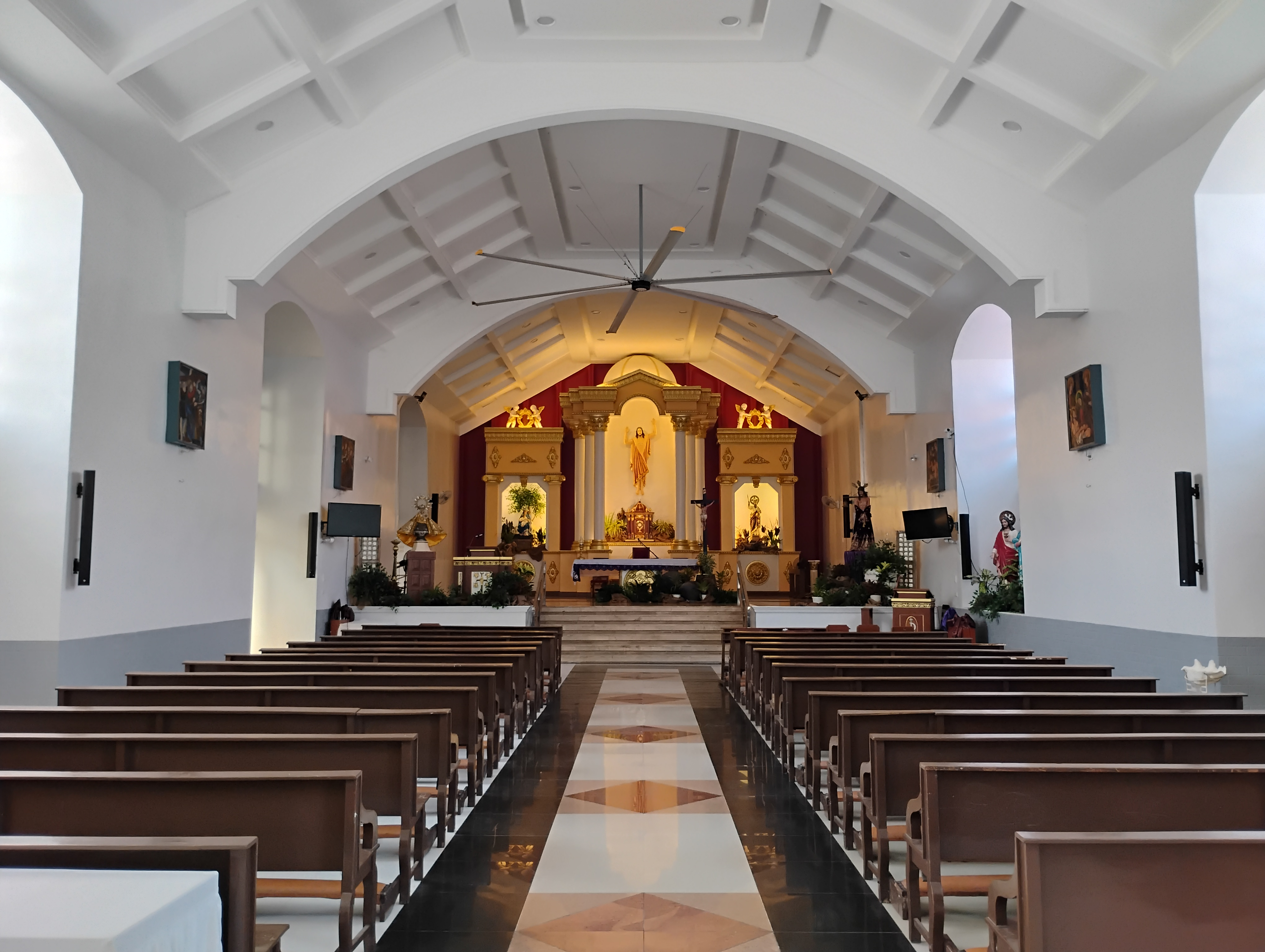
Church interior in 2026

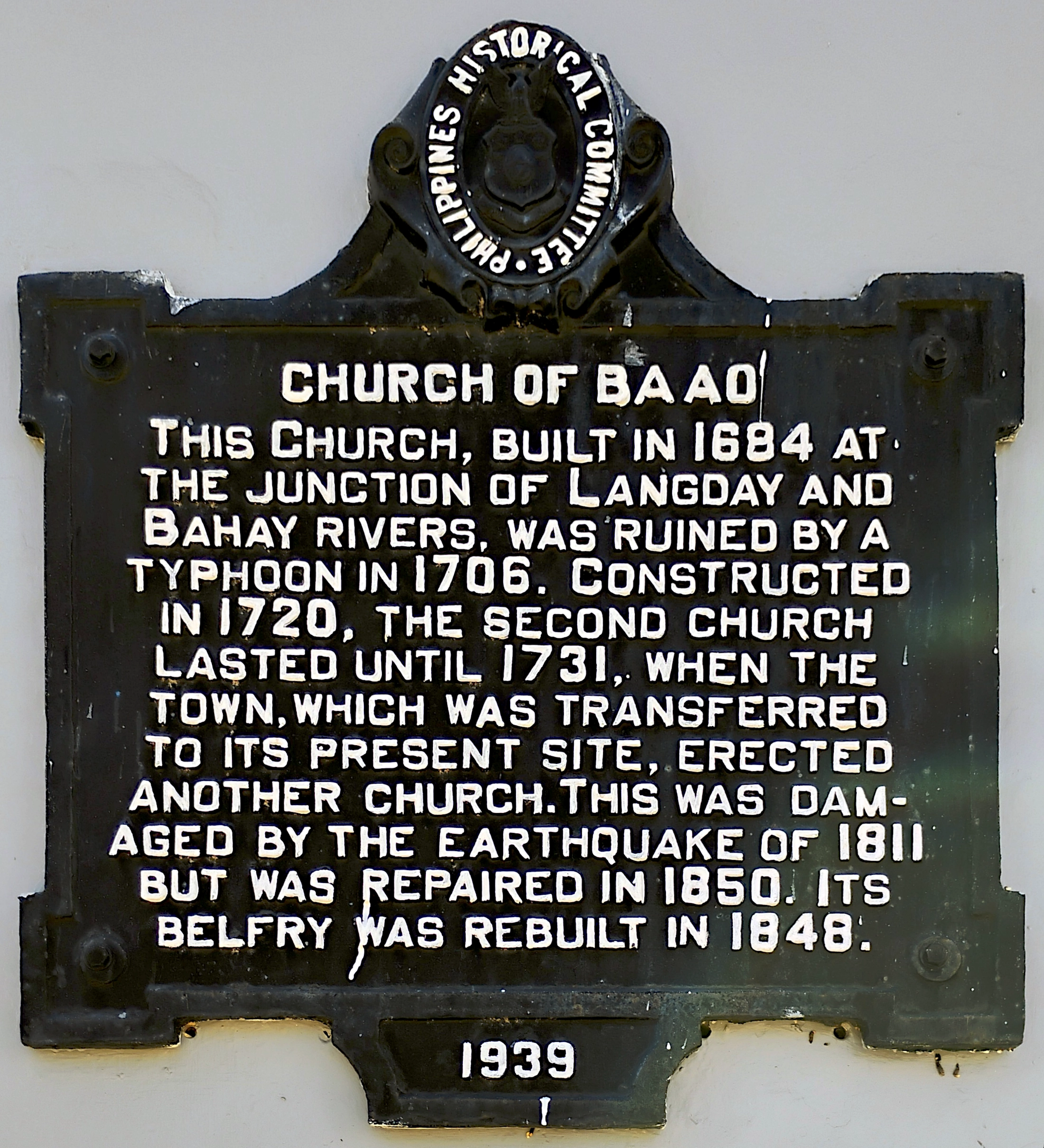
Church PHC historical marker installed in 1939
