= Magarao Church =

Roman Catholic church in Camarines Sur, Philippines

- Saint Anne Parish Church
- Parokya ni Santa Ana (Filipino); Parroquia de Santa Ana (Spanish)
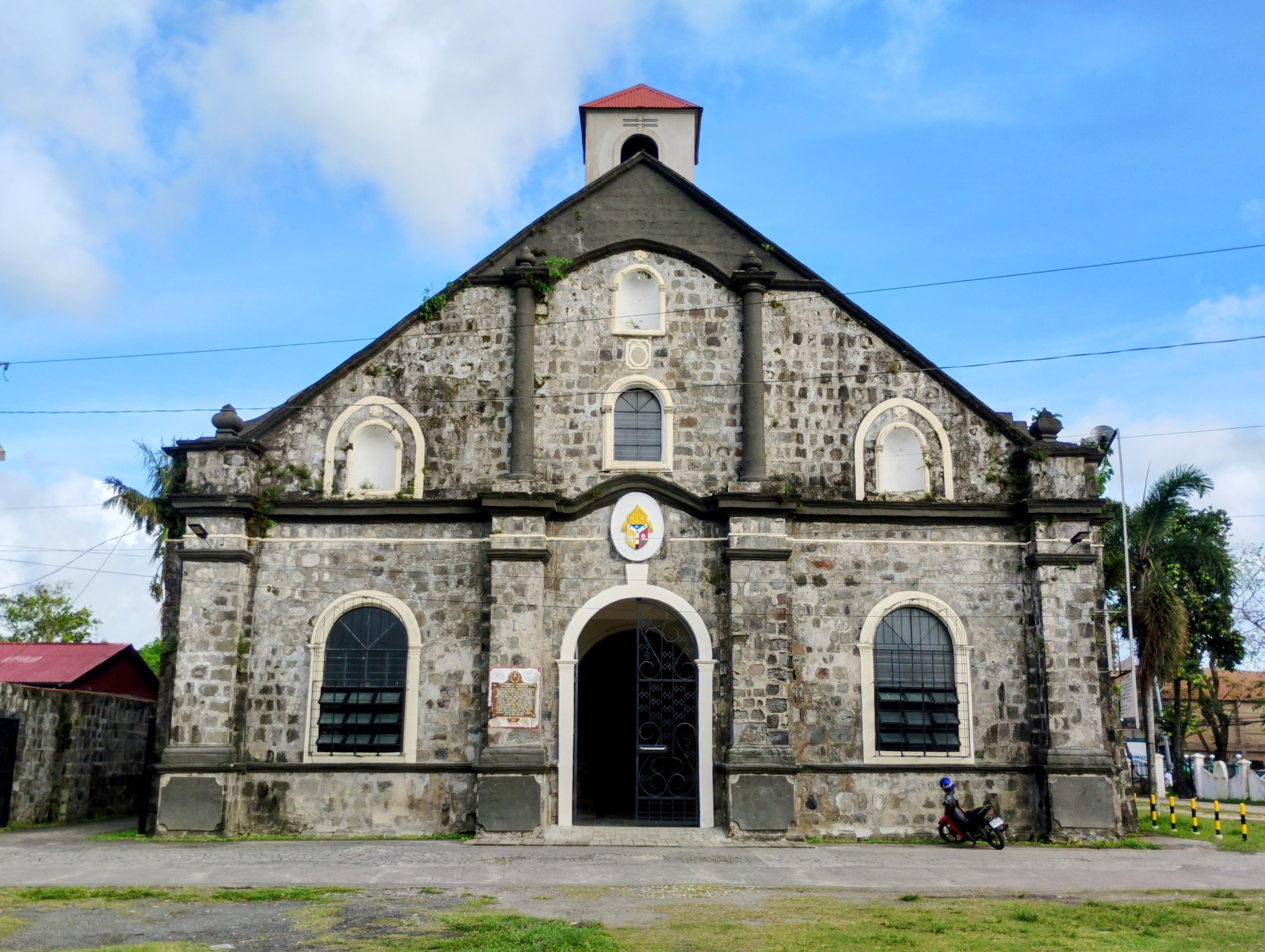
- Church facade in 2025.

- Location in Luzon Location in the Philippines
- 13°39′41″N 123°11′24″E
- Location: Magarao, Camarines Sur
- Country: Philippines
- Denomination: Roman Catholic

History
- Status: Church
- Founded: 1750; 276 years ago
- Dedication: Saint Anne
- Dedicated: August 23, 2020

Architecture
- Functional status: Active
- Heritage designation: National Historical Landmark
- Designated: 1939; 87 years ago
- Architectural type: Church building
- Style: Spanish Colonial architecture
- Completed: 1849; 177 years ago

Administration
- Archdiocese: Caceres
- Deanery: Saint Anne

The Saint Anne Parish Church, commonly known as Magarao Church, is a Roman Catholic church located in Magarao, Camarines Sur. It is under the jurisdiction of the Archdiocese of Caceres.

== History ==
The name “magarao” is derived from garao, a thorny shrub formerly abundant in the locality. Franciscan missionaries visited the settlement as early as 1570, with missionary activity renewed in 1690. The settlement was initially a visita of Canaman and became an independent parish in 1750.

An early church was destroyed by earthquakes in 1811, leading to the construction of a temporary structure made of wood, bamboo, and nipa. In 1826, construction of the present stone church commenced and was completed in 1849 together with the convent.

The church sustained significant damage during the earthquake of March 1887 and was subsequently repaired under Rev. Vicente Rojo and Rev. Higinio del Alamo, O.F.M. It also suffered damage from typhoons in 1942 and June 1972, with repairs recorded in 1948.

== Architecture ==
The church is an example of colonial-era ecclesiastical architecture characterized by thick masonry walls and massive supports. The façade features arched openings and pilasters resting on plinths, with decorative cartouches. The National Historical Commission of the Philippines declared it a national landmark and installed a historical marker on the church's facade on a pilaster near the main entrance on the gospel side in 1939.

The pediment contains an arched window and three alcoves, while a quadrangular belfry with a pyramidal roof rises above the structure. Finials are present along the outermost sections of the façade. The interior is distinguished by fiberglass panels bearing religious imagery and ornamental designs.

== Gallery ==
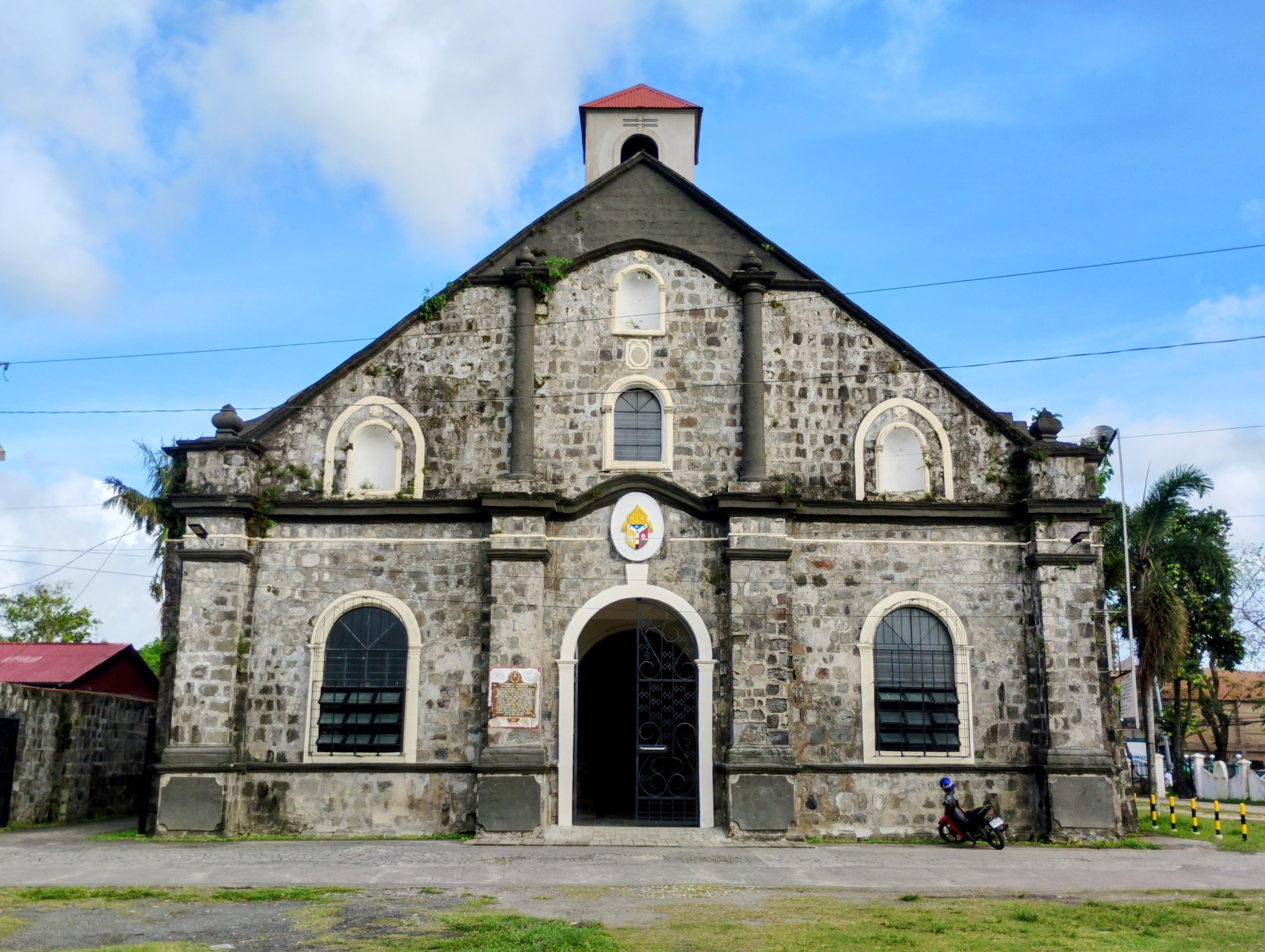
The church facade in 2025.

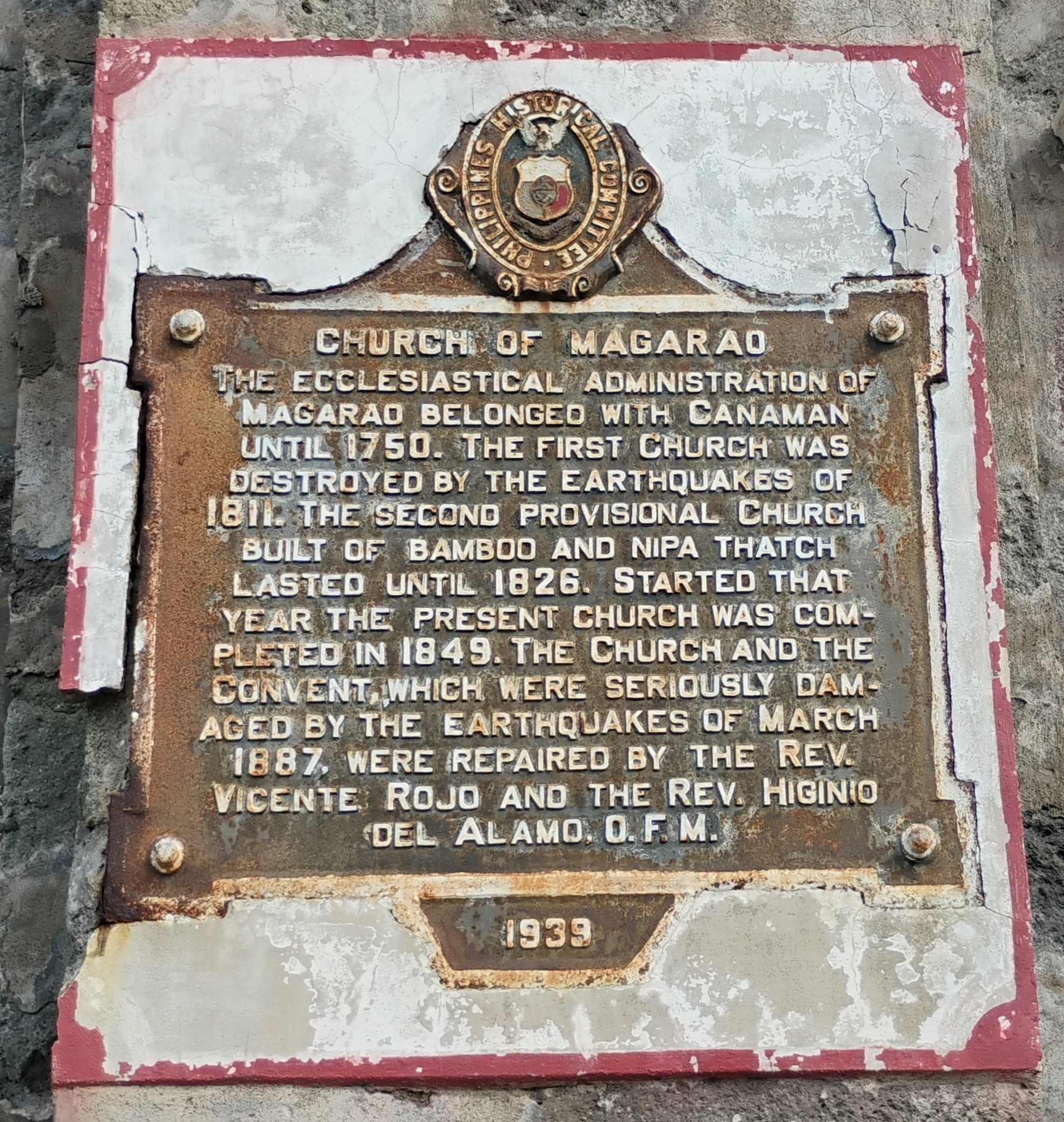
Church NHCP marker installed in 1939.

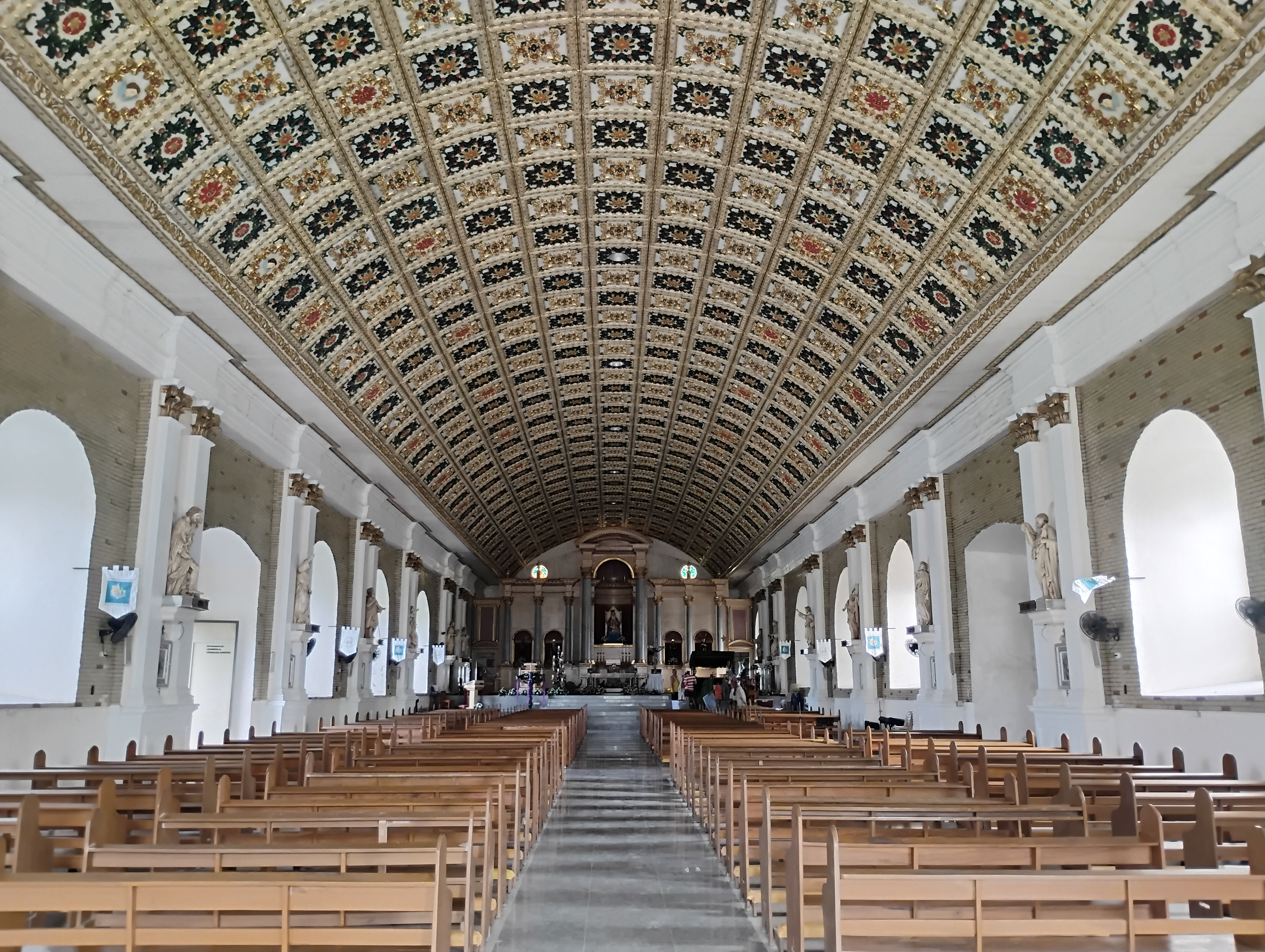
The church interior in 2025.

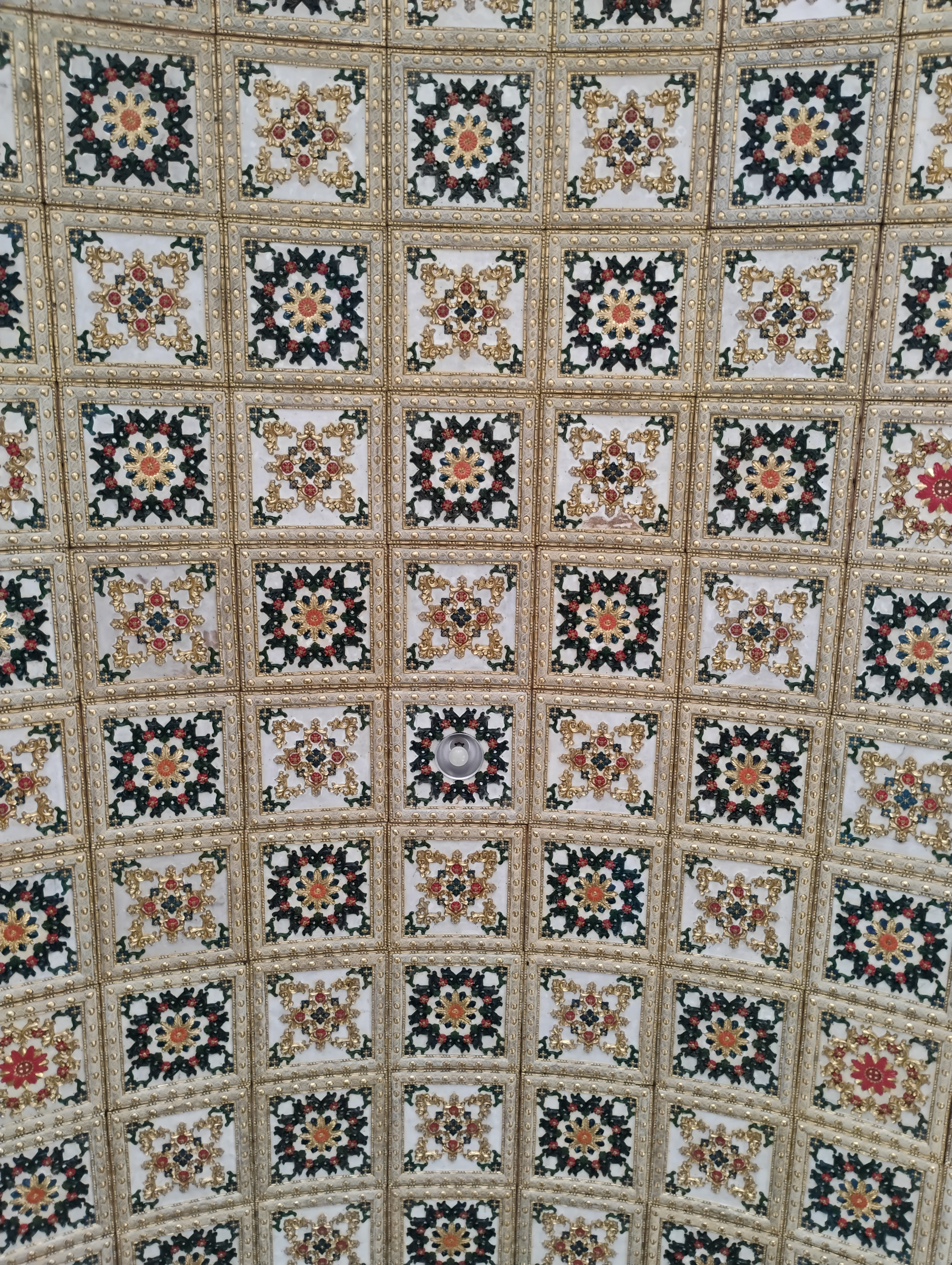
The details of the church's ceiling.

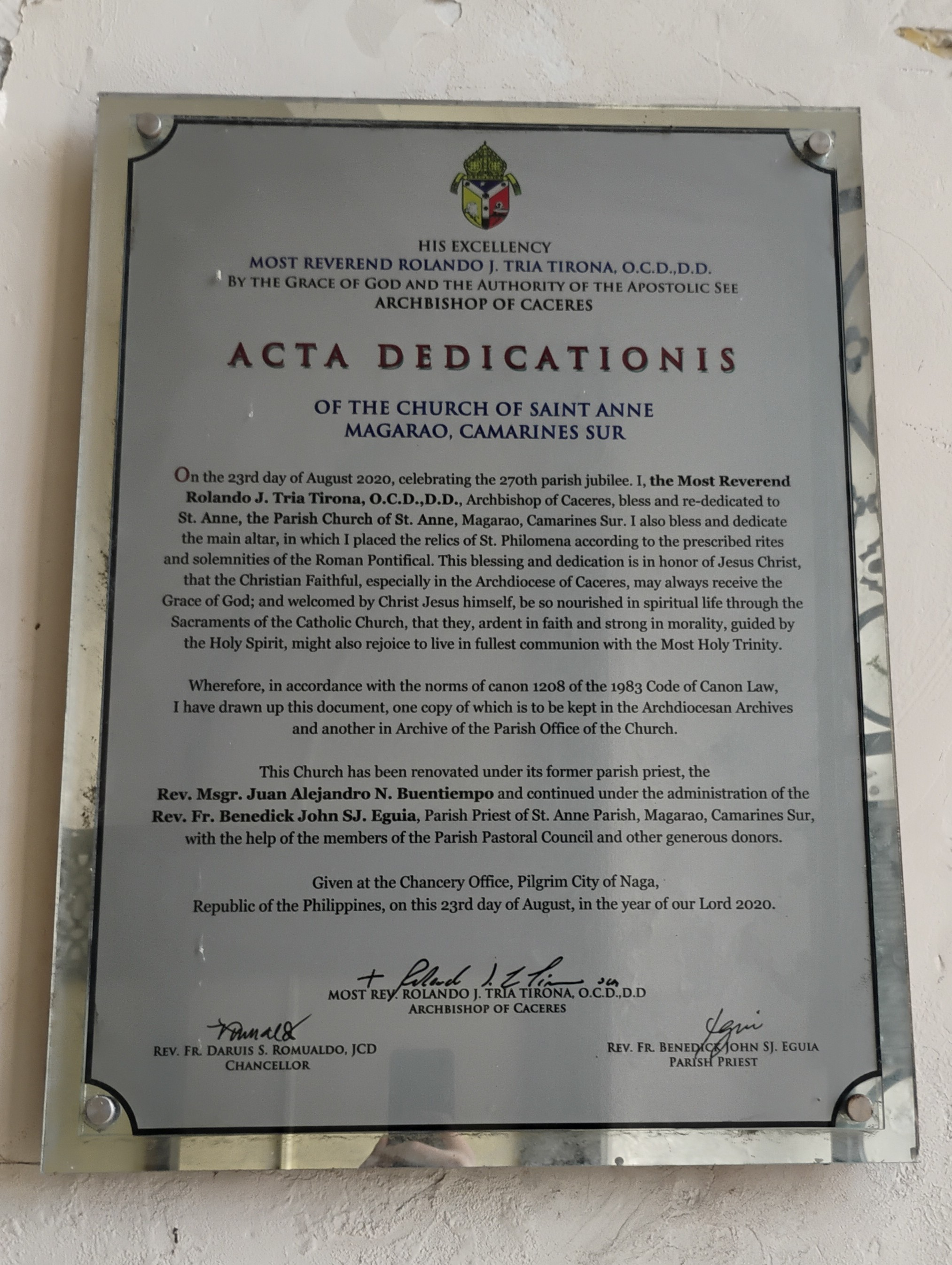
The church's dedication marker.

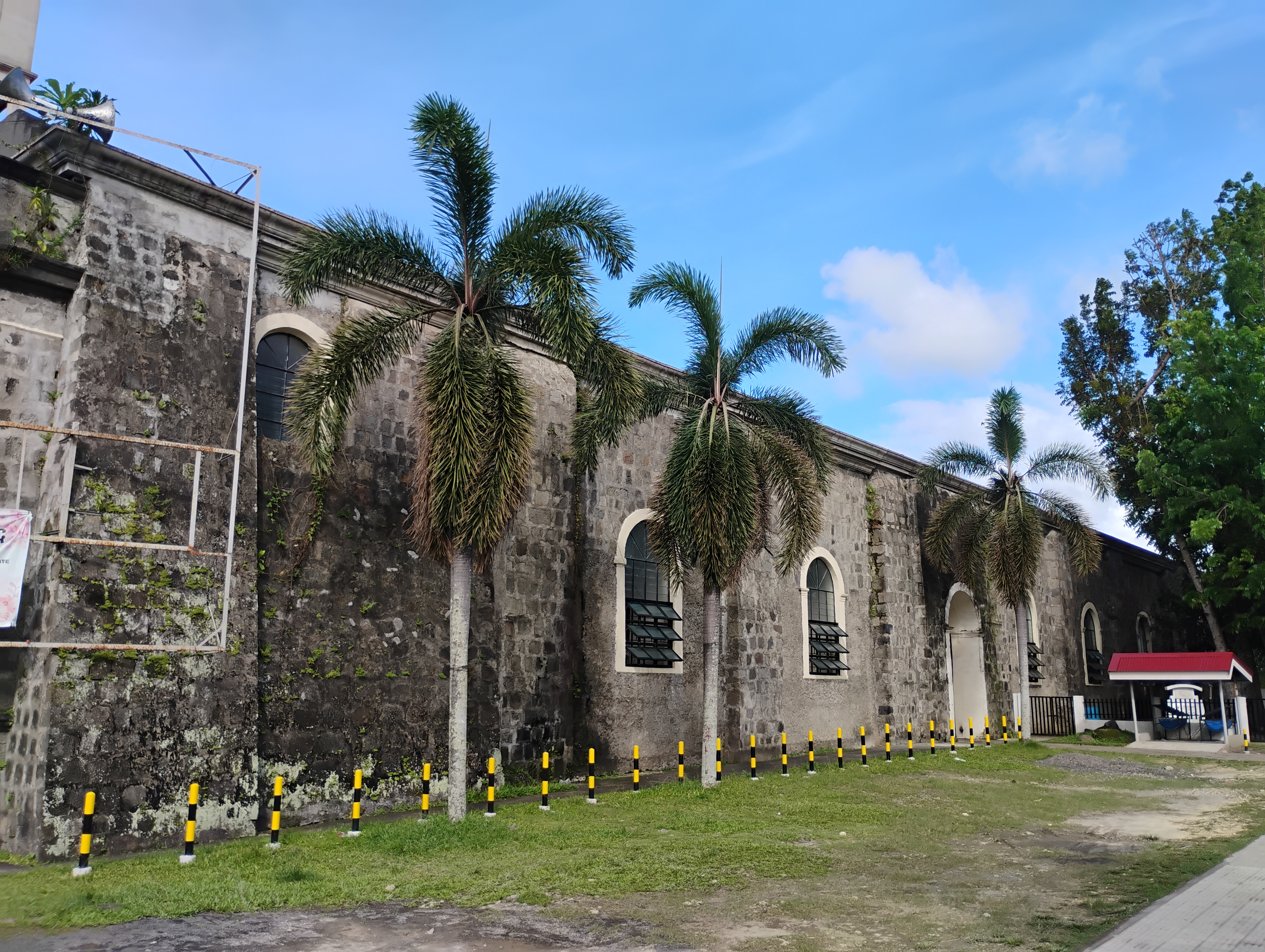
The side of the church.

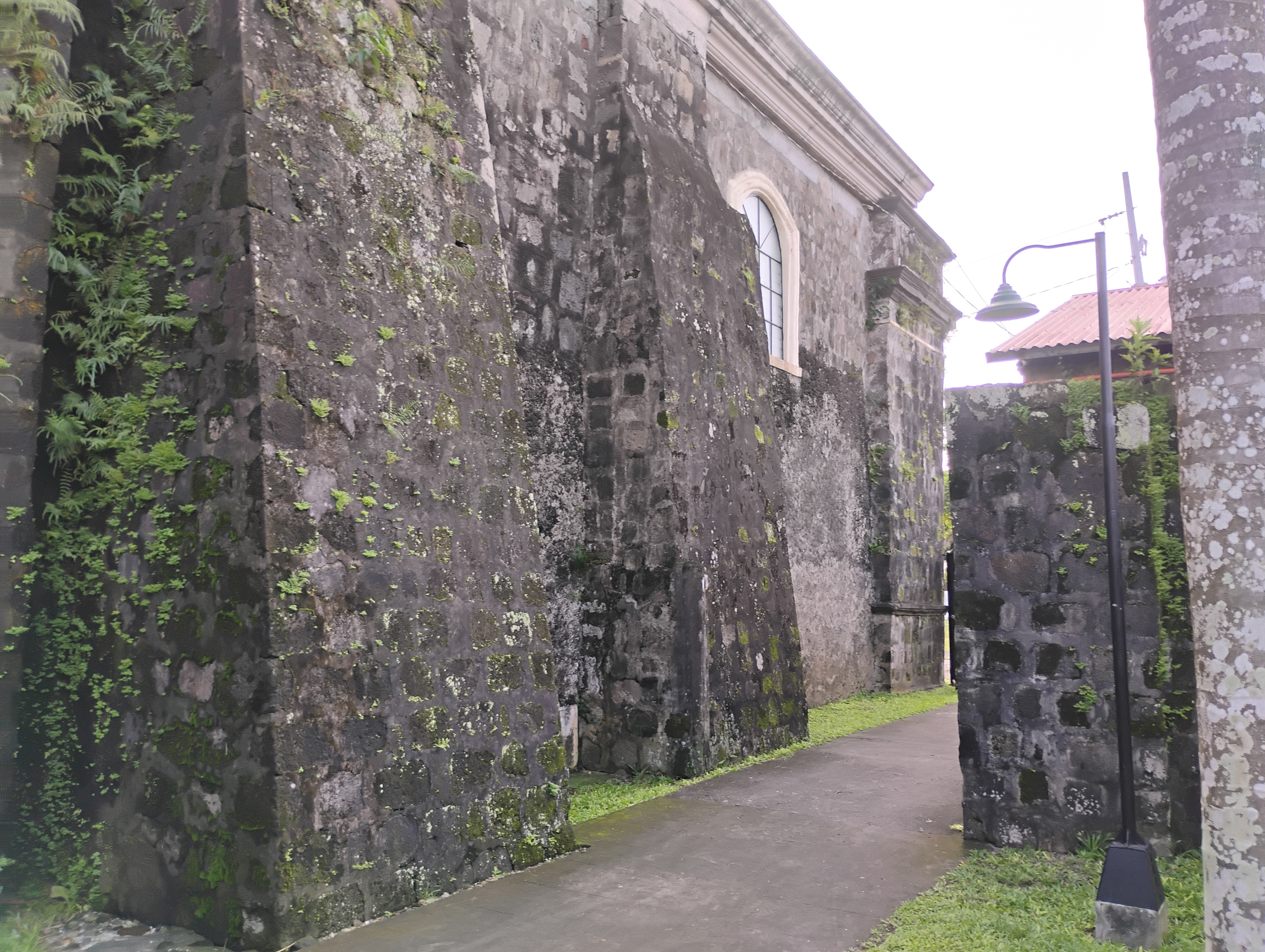
The church's buttresses.

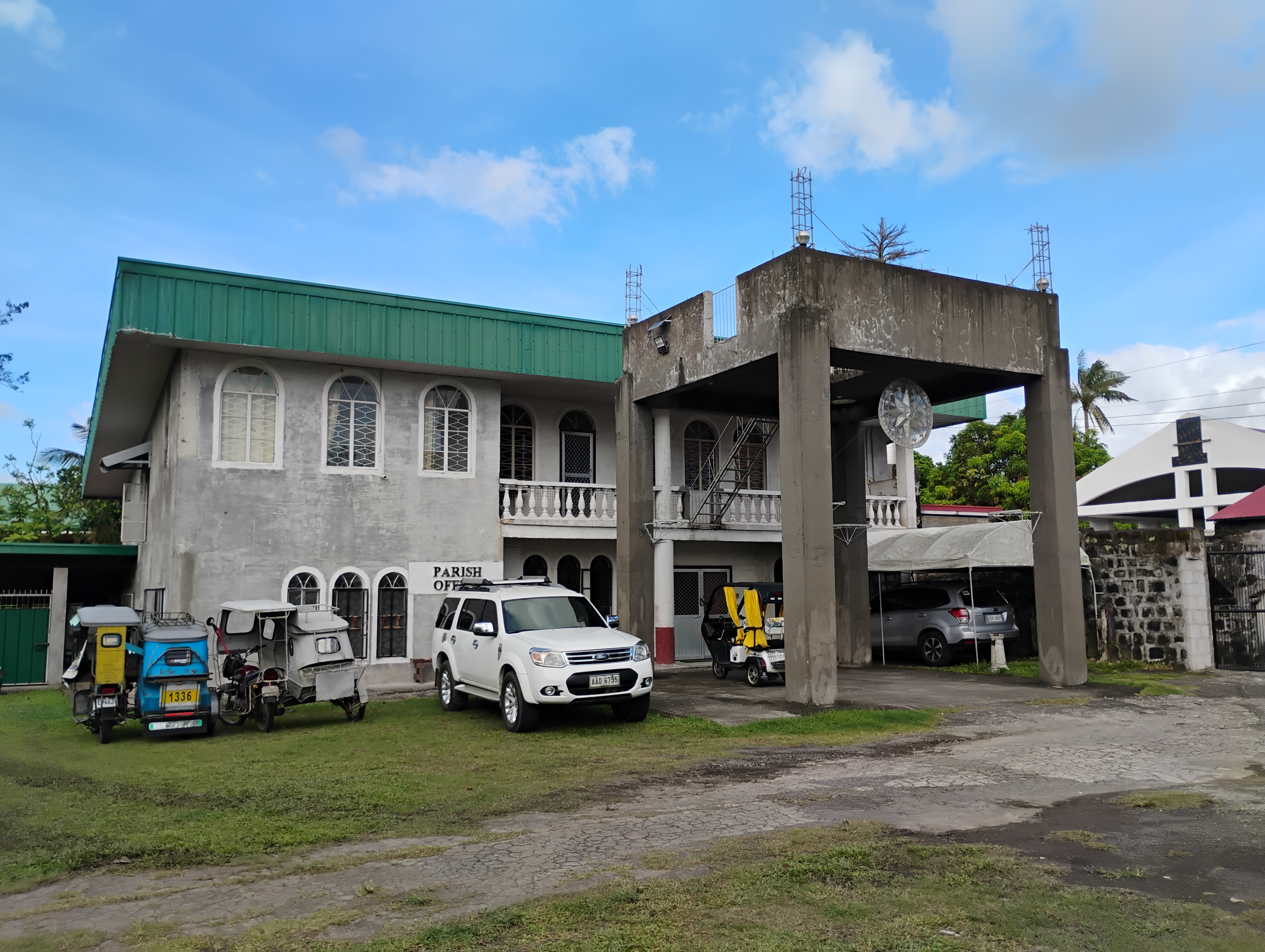
The parish office.
