= Bula Church =

Roman Catholic church in Camarines Sur, Philippines

- Saint Mary Magdalene Parish Church
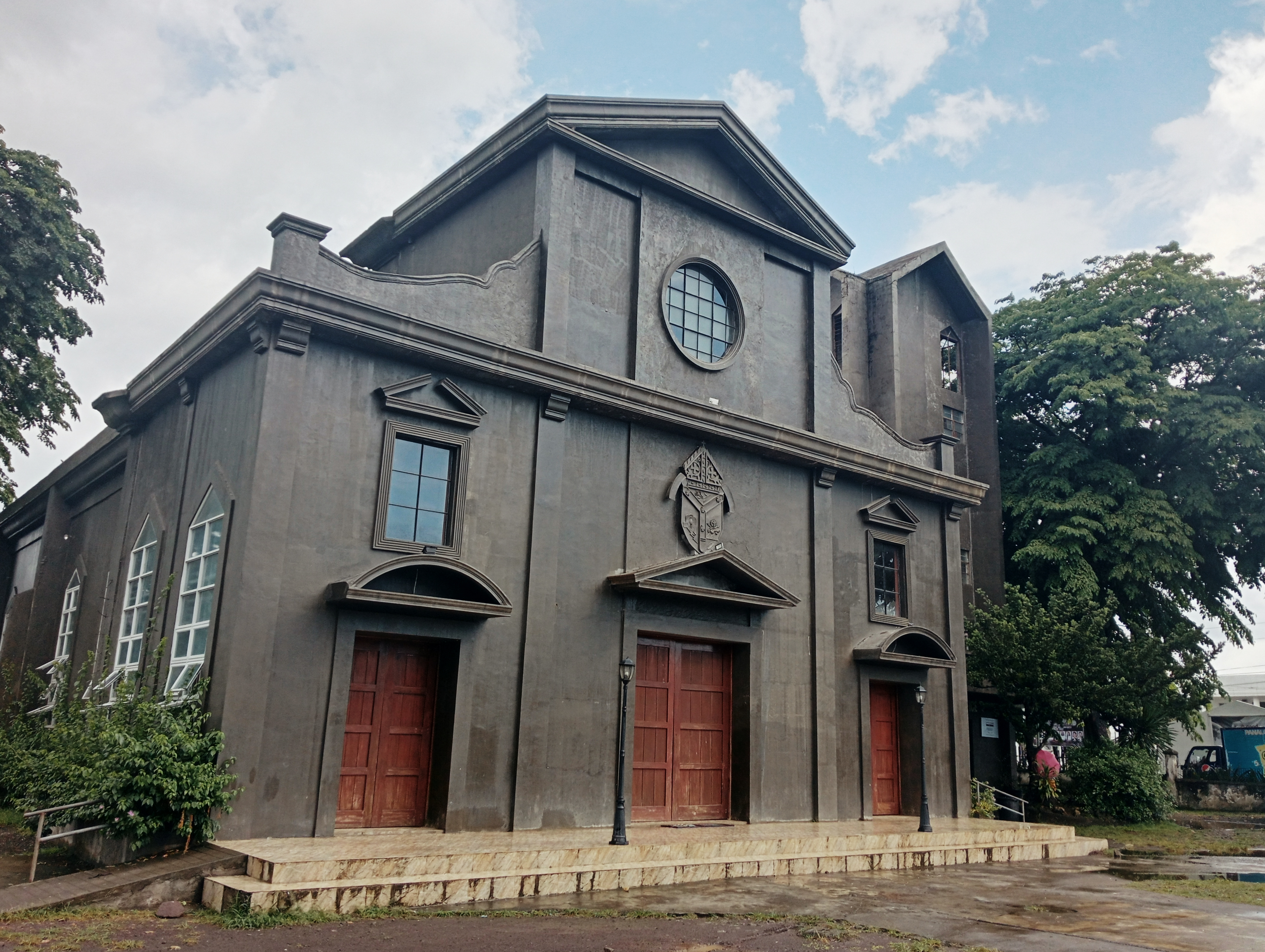
- Church facade in 2022

- Location in Luzon Location in the Philippines
- 13°28′07″N 123°16′39″E
- Location: Bula, Camarines Sur
- Country: Philippines
- Denomination: Roman Catholic

History
- Status: Parish church
- Dedication: Mary Magdalene

Architecture
- Functional status: Active
- Heritage designation: National Historical Landmark
- Designated: 1939
- Architectural type: Church building
- Completed: 1706; 320 years ago

Administration
- Archdiocese: Caceres

Saint Mary Magdalene Parish Church, commonly known as Bula Church, is a Roman Catholic church located in Bula, Camarines Sur, Philippines. It is under the jurisdiction of the Archdiocese of Caceres.

The church was destroyed by fire in 1676 and a typhoon in 1700. The present structure was completed in 1706, and repaired in 1876 and 1885.

The National Historical Commission of the Philippines declared it a national historical landmark in 1939.

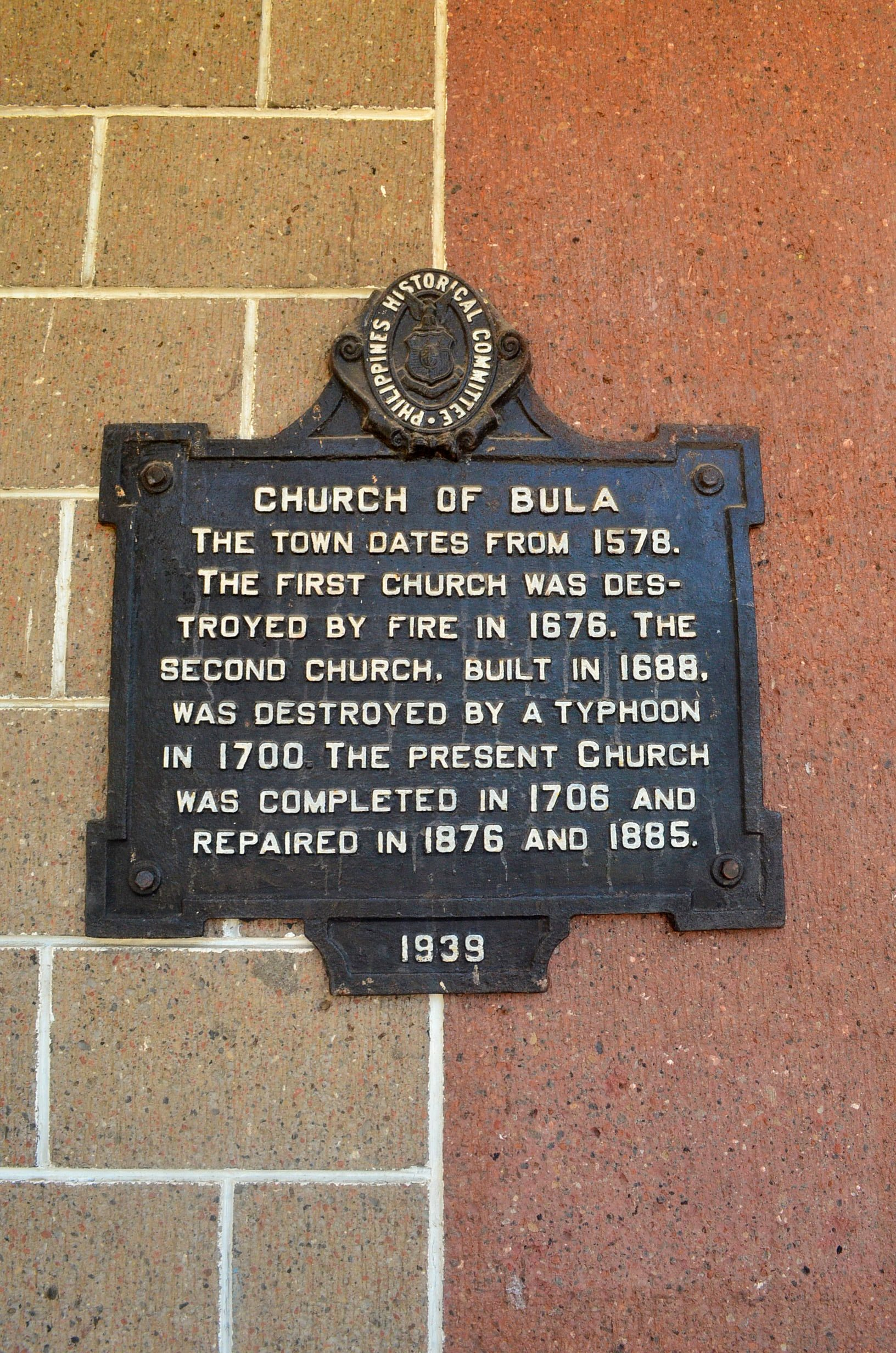
Church PHC historical marker installed in 1939
