= Philippines National Historical Landmarks =

Philippines National Historic Landmarks is a registry of historic sites in the Philippines that have been officially declared by the Philippine Registry of Cultural Property.

There appear to be about 120 of them, as of August 2018. (Note: The PRCP's "blogspot" webpage indicates 118 postings by the National Historical Commission of the Philippines tagged as "National Historic Landmark" as of August 2018. However then there turns out to be 124 such postings.) These are:

1. Basilica Minore del Sto. Niño and Convent (Cebu City)
2. Session Hall of the Senate of the Philippines
3. Bradford Memorial Chapel
4. Manila Bay and Waterfront from Del Pan Bridge to the Cultural Center of the Philippines
5. Embassy of the Philippines - Tokyo
6. Zapote Battlefield
7. Fort Pikit
8. Old Iloilo City Hall
9. Simbahan ng San Joaquin
10. Simbahan ng Dauis
11. Simbahan ng Molo
12. Casa de Comunidad de Tayabas
13. Church of Tabaco
14. Leyte Provincial Capitol
15. Simbahan ng Loon
16. Simbahan ng Ivana
17. Church, Convent and Site of the Beaterio of Sabtang
18. Old Legislative Building (now National Museum of Fine Arts)
19. Miag-ao Church Historical Landmark
20. Bahay Nakpil-Bautista
21. Quezon Provincial Capitol Building
22. Cebu Provincial Capitol
23. Baptistry of the Church of Calamba
24. Dauis Church Complex
25. Church of San Agustin
26. Church of San Sebastian Historical Landmark
27. Church of Paete
28. Simbahan ng Dumangas
29. Ang Kapilya ng Ermita
30. Rosendo Mejica Historical Landmark (try Rosendo Mejica)
31. Bantayan ng Punta Cruz
32. President Carlos P. Garcia House
33. Simbahan ng Lazi
34. MacArthur Landing Site/Leyte Landing Site
35. Katedral ng Maasin
36. Intramuros and its Walls
37. Birthplace of Antonio Luna (try Antonio Luna)
38. Church of the Holy Sacrifice
39. P. Burgos Elementary School Historical Landmark (try P. Burgos Elementary School)
40. Filipino-Japanese Friendship Historical Landmark
41. First Rizal Monument in the Philippines
42. Wenceslao Vinzons Historical Landmark
43. Cuartel de Santo Domingo
44. Corregidor
45. Labanan sa Imus
46. Parola ng Malabrigo
47. Taal Church Historical Landmark
48. Church of Baler Historical Landmark (try Church of Baler)
49. Birthplace of General Gregorio del Pilar
50. Teodoro Brillantes House
51. Gen. Juan Araneta Historical Landmark (try Gen. Juan Araneta)
52. Gen. Aniceto Lacson Historical Landmark (try Gen. Aniceto Lacson)
53. Belfry of the Jaro Cathedral
54. Vicente Manansala Historical Landmark (try Vicente Manansala)
55. Ang Sigaw ng Pugadlawin
56. Birthplace of Felix Y. Manalo (Felix Y. Manalo)
57. Simbahan ng Boac
58. Capas Concentration Camp
59. Church of Abucay
60. Church of Lubao
61. Balantang Memorial Cemetery
62. Elks Club Building Historical Landmark
63. Army and Navy Club Building
64. Paciano Rizal House
65. Battle of Alapan
66. Torogan House
67. President Diosdado P. Macapagal Museum and Library (Diosdado P. Macapagal)
68. The Tejeros Convention (Casa Hacienda and its Environs) (Tejeros Convention, Casa Hacienda)
69. Simbahan Parokya ng Quipayo
70. Baldomero Aguinaldo Historical Landmark (Baldomero Aguinaldo)
71. Miguel Malvar Historical Landmark (Miguel Malvar)
72. Barasoain Church Historical Landmark (Barasoain Church)
73. Leon Apacible Historical Landmark (Leon Apacible)
74. Marcela Agoncillo Historical Landmark (Marcela Agoncillo), birthplace of Doña Marcela Mariño de Agoncillo, maker of the first Philippine Flag.
75. Nagcarlan Underground Cemetery Historical Landmark (Nagcarlan Underground Cemetery)
76. Portion of the Town of Taal (Town of Taal, Taal)
77. Parola ng Cape Melville
78. Church of Pan-ay
79. Church, Convent, and Cemetery of Barotac
80. Malacañang Palace
81. Luneta Hotel
82. Town Center of Pila (Town of Pila, Pila)
83. Town Center of Malolos (Town of Malolos, Malolos)
84. Mehan Gardens
85. Fuerte De La Conception Y Del Triunfo
86. Plaza Libertad
87. Parola ng Bagacay Point
88. Jose P. Laurel Monument, Batangas (Jose P. Laurel, Jose P. Laurel Monument)
89. Sergio Osmeña House Historical Landmark (Sergio Osmeña House Historical Landmark)
90. Birthplace of Father Jacinto Zamora (Jacinto Zamora)
91. Mansion House
92. Surrender Site of General Tomuyuki Yamashita (Tomuyuki Yamashita, Surrender of General Yamashita)
93. Old Casa Real and Provincial Capitol of Pangasinan
94. Simbahan ng Sta. Maria
95. Church of Bacarra
96. Church of Paoay
97. Battle Site Memorial of Pulang Lupa
98. Bank of the Philippine Islands
99. Dapitan - Liwasan ng Dapitan) Liwasan ng Dapitan)
100. Sheik Karimul Makhdum Mosque
101. Iwahig Penal Prison and Farm (Iwahig Penal Prison, Iwahig Penal Colony)
102. Simbahan ng Baclayon
103. Simbahan ng Boljoon
104. Ramon Magsaysay Historical Landmark (Ramon Magsaysay)
105. Bonifacio Trial House
106. Church of San Pedro Apostol (Loboc Church) (Church of San Pedro Apostol, Loboc Church)
107. Ang Tahanan Ng Pamilyang Aquino
108. Simbahan ng Santisima Trinidad ng Loay
109. Manila Hotel
110. Church of Nuestra Senora De La Consolacion (Argao Church) (Church of Nuestra Senora De La Consolacion, Argao Church)
111. Mausoleo de los Veteranos de la Revolucion
112. Simbahang Immaculada Conception ng Tamontaka
113. Parola ng Bojeador
114. Negros Occidental Provincial Capitol
115. Manila Metropolitan Theater
116. Pinaglabanan Memorial Shrine
117. Church of San Guillermo de Aquitania (Dalaguete Church) (Church of San Guillermo de Aquitania, Dalaguete Church)
118. Silliman University
119. Rizal National Monument
120. Mabini Shrine, PUP
121. Seminary of Nueva Caceres
122. Mercado Mansion
123. Ang Dakong Balay (Don Florencio Noel House), (Ang Dakong Balay, Don Florencio Noel House)
124. Silva House
125. Balay na Tisa (Sarmiento-Osmeña House) (Balay na Tisa, Sarmiento-Osmeña House)
126. Philippine Military Academy
127. Tumauini Church (St. Matthias Church in Tumauini, Isabela)
