= Dalaguete Church =

Roman Catholic church in Cebu, Philippines

- San Guillermo de Aquitania Church
- Saint William of Aquitaine Church
- Parokya ni San Guillermo de Aquitania (Filipino)
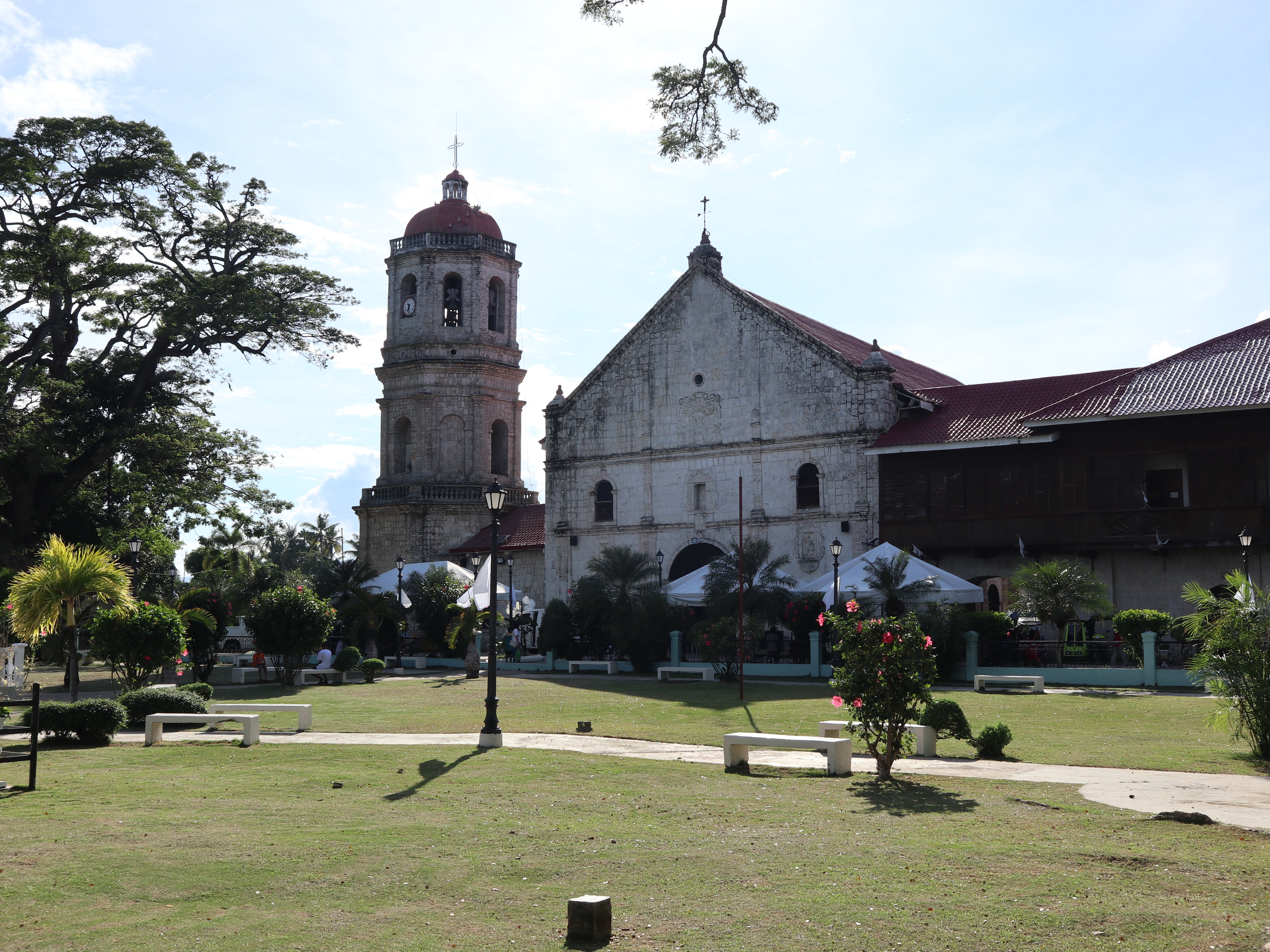
- Church facade in 2023

- Location in Cebu Location in the Visayas Location in the Philippines
- 9°45′45.32″N 123°32′06.68″E
- Location: Dalaguete, Cebu
- Country: Philippines
- Denomination: Roman Catholic

History
- Status: Parish church
- Dedication: William of Gellone, also known as William of Aquitaine

Architecture
- Functional status: Active
- Heritage designation: National Historical Landmark and National Cultural Treasure
- Designated: 2004 and 2024
- Architectural type: Church building
- Style: Baroque-Rococo
- Completed: 1825; 201 years ago

Administration
- Archdiocese: Cebu

San Guillermo de Aquitania Parish Church, commonly known as Dalaguete Church, is a Roman Catholic church located in Dalaguete, Cebu, Philippines. Dedicated to the French saint William of Gellone, also known as William of Aquitaine, it is under the jurisdiction of the Archdiocese of Cebu. The church was constructed in 1802 and was completed in 1825.

== Architecture and style ==
Dalaguete Church is built of coral stones, has a three-level facade with religious embellished carvings and architectural features, a three-bodied bell tower, and a convent. The church's main building is connected to the bell tower by a low structure and the convent stands across the belfry.

The side windows of the church has pointed arches at the top, hinting a Gothic influence. Inside the church are the ornate main and side retablos in Rococo style, and the ceiling paintings by Canuto Avila and his sons in 1935.

== Patron saint ==
The true identity of the church's patron saint has been a debate for years. It is because the town fiesta of Dalaguete is celebrated not on May 28, which is the feast day of Saint William of Gellone. Instead, the town fiesta is celebrated every February 10, the feast day of another saint with the same name, William of Maleval.

== Recognitions ==
The National Historical Commission of the Philippines declared the church as a national historical landmark in 2004. On June 27, 2019, the National Museum of the Philippines declared the "San Guillermo De Aquitania Church of Dalaguete", a National Cultural Treasure under the National Heritage Act, the fourth structure in Cebu. However, it was only on February 9, 2024, that the National Historical Commission of the Philippines historical marker was installed when José S. Palma and NMP-Cebu head Audrey Dawn Tomada led the unveiling ceremony.

== Thefts ==
In 2002, several colonial era relics, including sculptures of the Sacred Heart of Jesus and Saints Thomas of Villanova, John of Sahagún, Vincent Ferrer and Anthony of Padua were stolen from the church. In 2024, the Dalaguete Parish Pastoral Council announced plans to file claims against auction house Leon Gallery after two religious sculptures suspected to be that of Saints Thomas of Villanova and John of Sahagún were found to have been auctioned off by the latter in 2017 and 2018.

== Gallery ==
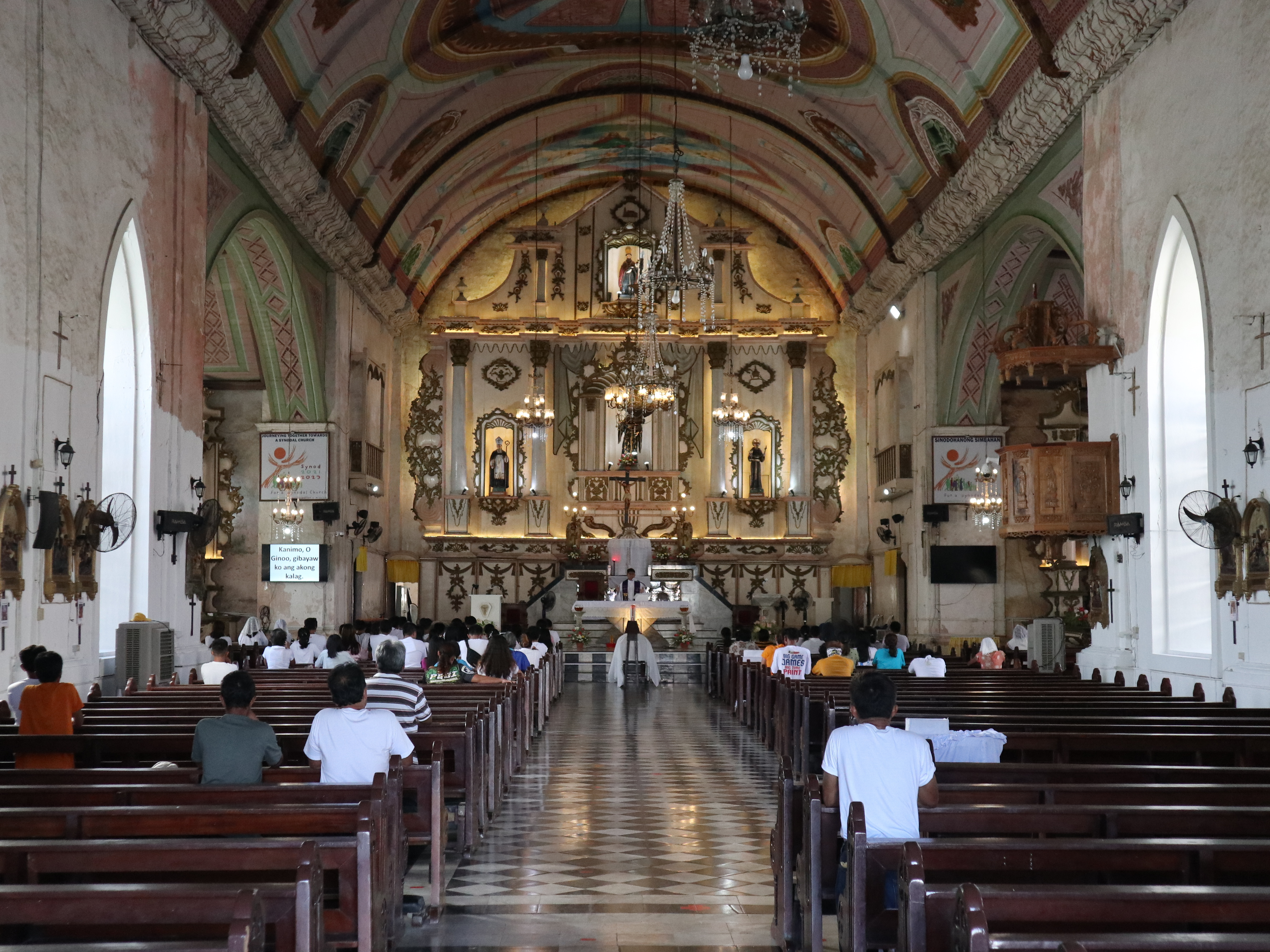
Church interior in 2023

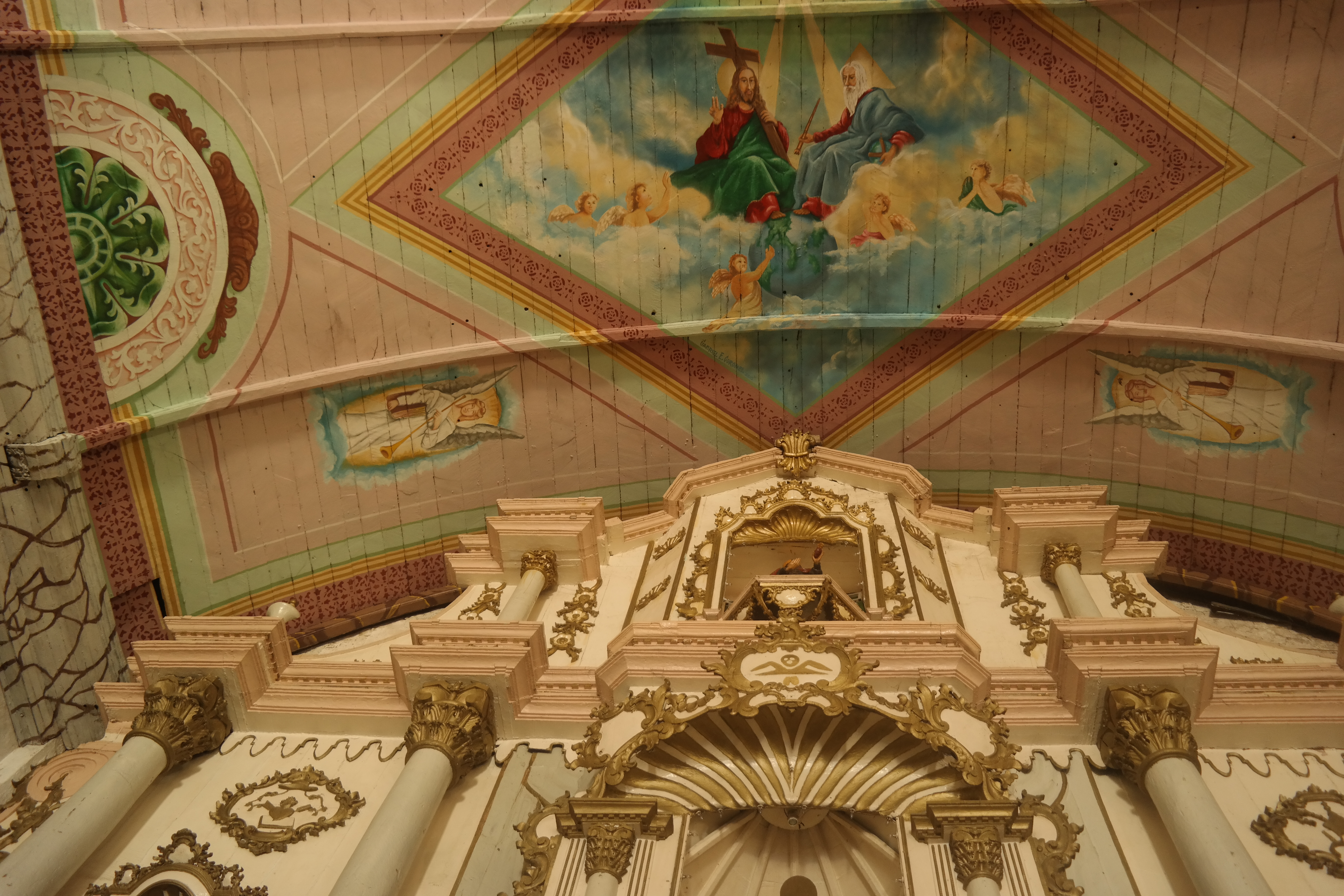
Church ceiling

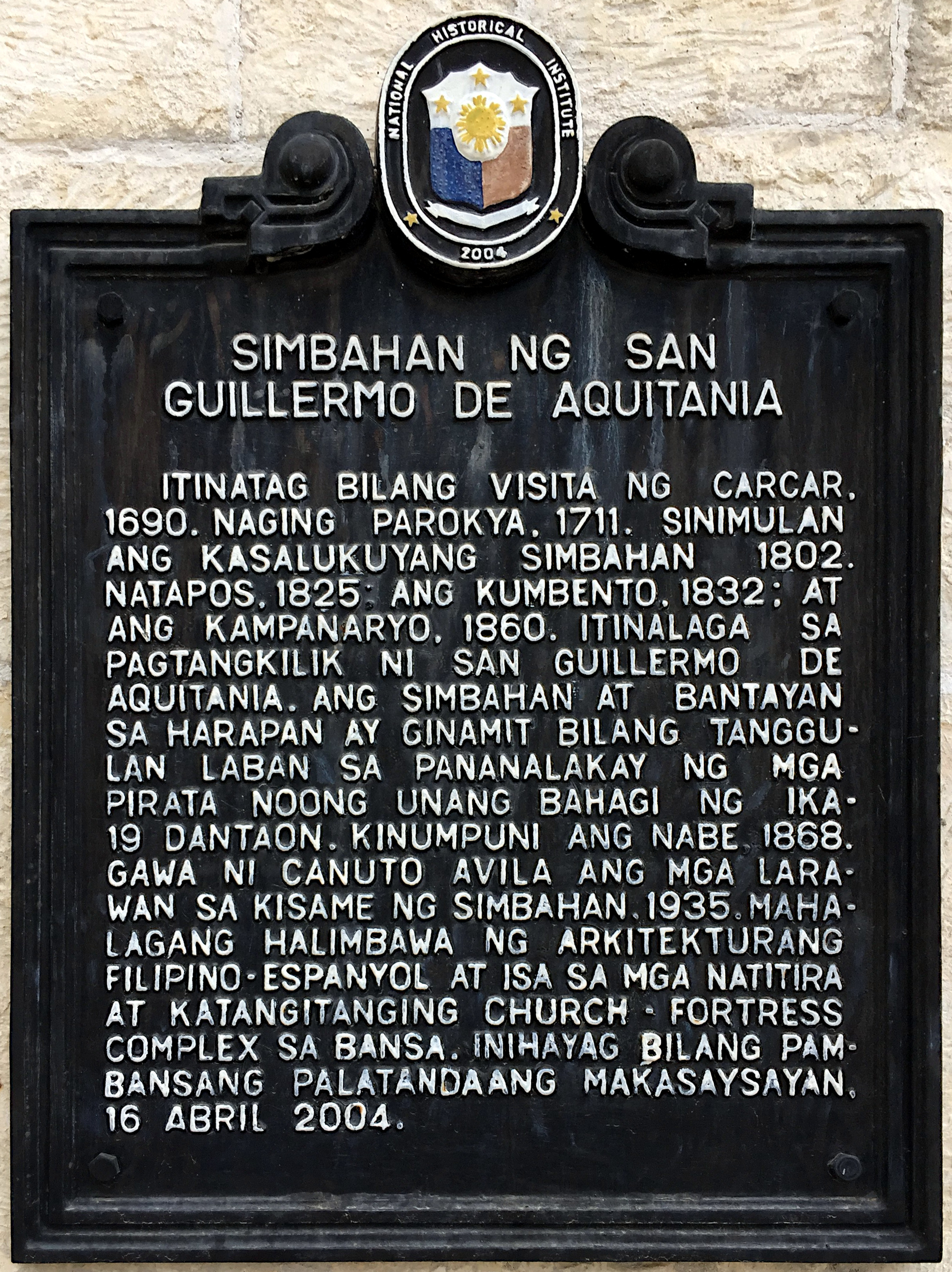
Church NHI historical marker installed in 2004
