= Cuartel de Santo Domingo =

- Fort Santo Domingo
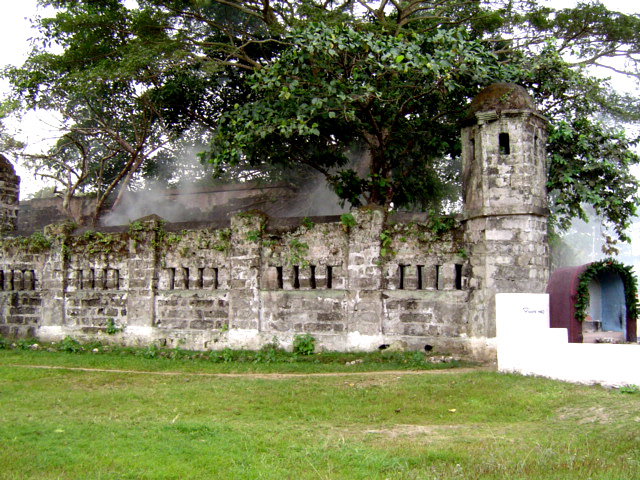
- Walls of Cuartel de Santo Domingo
- Interactive map of the Cuartel de Santo Domingo area
- Alternative names: Intramuros of Santa Rosa

General information
- Type: Fortification
- Architectural style: Bastioned fort
- Location: Santa Rosa–Tagaytay Road, Santa Rosa, Laguna, Philippines
- Coordinates: 14.23081°N 121.04986°E
- Current tenants: Philippine National Police; Special Action Force
- Named for: Saint Dominic
- Completed: 1877
- Owner: Philippine Government

Dimensions
- Other dimensions: 8.2 hectares (20 acres)

Technical details
- Structural system: Masonry

Design and construction
- Designations: National Historical Landmark

Cuartel de Santo Domingo, also known as Fort Santo Domingo and Intramuros of Sta. Rosa, is an old two-storey Spanish barracks building in Santa Rosa, Laguna in the Philippines. It is currently used as the headquarters of the Special Action Force of the Philippine National Police.

== Profile ==
The bastion is strategically located in Barangay Santo Domingo, Santa Rosa, Laguna near the municipality of Silang. It is named after Saint Dominic, the founder of the Dominican Order which owns the lands around Santa Rosa, Biñan and Calamba.

The whole cuartel is built across an 8.2-hectare (20-acre) stretch of land. Its walls are made up of adobe stones. Some of the interior walls inside were part of the ruins of the old fort. Watchtowers are not presently used since the building is covered with huge trees.

== History ==
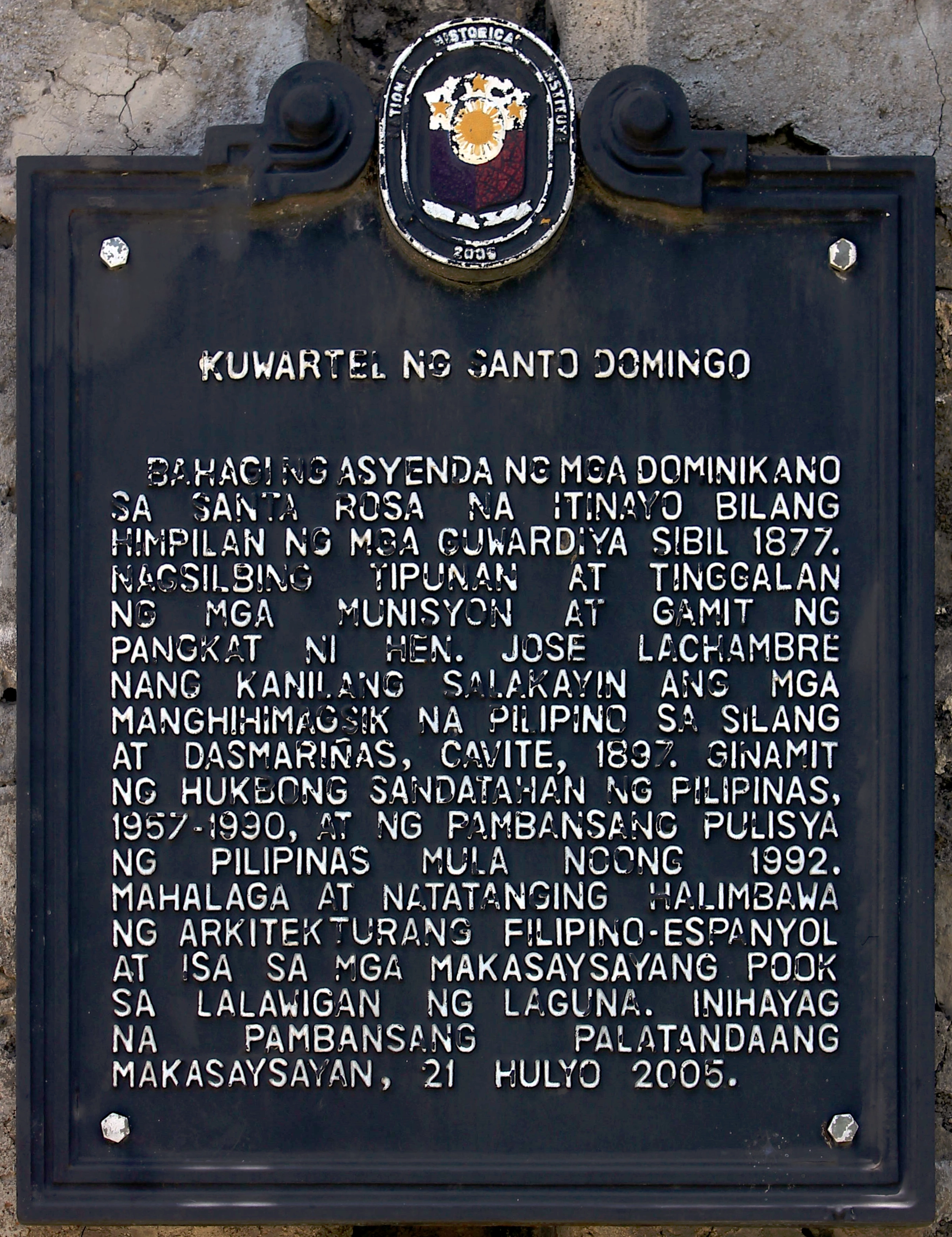
National historical marker installed in 2005

The fort was built in 1877 as headquarters of the guardia civil against tulisanes or bandits. Standing close to Silang, its adobe walls were built to protect the town, particularly the Dominican haciendas of Santa Rosa and Biñan, from tulisanes coming from Cavite. During the revolution, it served as headquarters of the Spaniards led by Gen. Jose Lachambre against the army of Gen. Emilio Aguinaldo from Cavite in 1897. The fort also served as a refuge for women from Cabuyao and Calamba to protect them from being abused by the Imperial Japanese Army and transformed as a center of commerce during the Japanese occupation. It was used by the Philippine Army from 1957 to 1990 and has been used by the Philippine National Police since 1992.

== The Fort today ==
The fort was declared a National Historical Landmark by the National Historic Institute (now National Historical Commission of the Philippines) under NHI Resolution No. 3, series 2005 on July 21, 2005. A marker was unveiled on September 20, 2005. On January 14, 2019, the fort was named as an Important Cultural Property by the National Museum of the Philippines. On July 29, 2025, Santa Rosa Representative Roy Gonzales filed House Bill No. 2485, which seeks to declare the fort as a heritage site; the bill is pending before the House Committee on Basic Education and Culture.

Currently, the fort serves as the headquarters and training camp of the Philippine National Police's Special Action Force and as a detention center for many big-time political detainees such as former president Joseph Estrada, Moro National Liberation Front (MNLF) chair Nur Misuari, former senator Gregorio Honasan, and Janet Lim-Napoles. Since it now served as prisoners of high-profile detainees, the cuartel is off-limits to the public. The use of the fort as a detention facility was strongly opposed by Laguna's 1st District Representative Dan Fernandez.

The southwestern part of the fort was realigned to make way for the construction of the Santa Rosa City Exit of Cavite–Laguna Expressway.

== Management ==
Since 2000, the people of Santa Rosa, through an organization called Kilusan Cuartel de Santo Domingo, have "wanted to return the fort to the Local Government Unit of Santa Rosa from the ownership of the military and the police". Laguna 1st District Representative Dan Fernandez also appealed to Congress that the government unit owns it, not the military nor the police.
