= Quipayo Church =

Roman Catholic church in Camarines Sur, Philippines

- Our Lady of the Immaculate Conception Parish Church
- Parroquia De La Inmaculada Concepcion (Spanish)
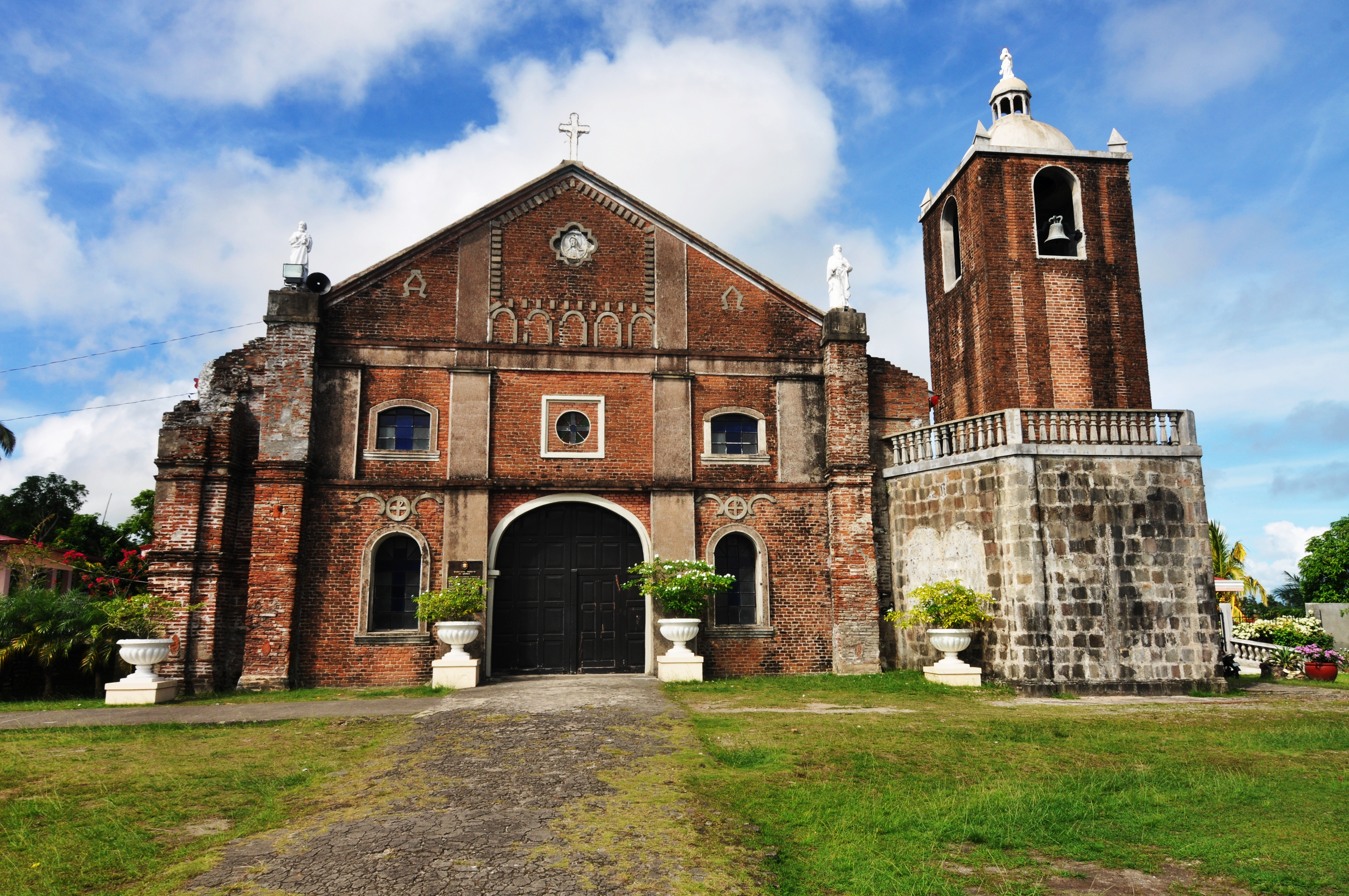
- Church facade in 2014

- Location in Luzon Location in the Philippines
- 13°41′56″N 123°12′3″E
- Location: Calabanga, Camarines Sur
- Country: Philippines
- Denomination: Roman Catholic

History
- Status: Parish church
- Dedication: Immaculate Conception

Architecture
- Functional status: Active
- Heritage designation: National Historical Landmark
- Designated: 1979
- Architectural type: Church building
- Completed: 1616; 410 years ago

Administration
- Archdiocese: Caceres

Our Lady of the Immaculate Conception Parish Church, also known as Quipayo Church, is a Roman Catholic church located in Calabanga, Camarines Sur, Philippines. It is under the jurisdiction of the Archdiocese of Caceres.

The original church was established by Franciscan missionaries in 1578 and was made of wood and nipa; in 1616, a brick structure was built to replace it. The church's facade was made of ladrillo, a kind of rockhard, reddish-brown brick.

The National Historical Commission of the Philippines declared the Baroque church a national historical landmark in 1979.

== Gallery ==
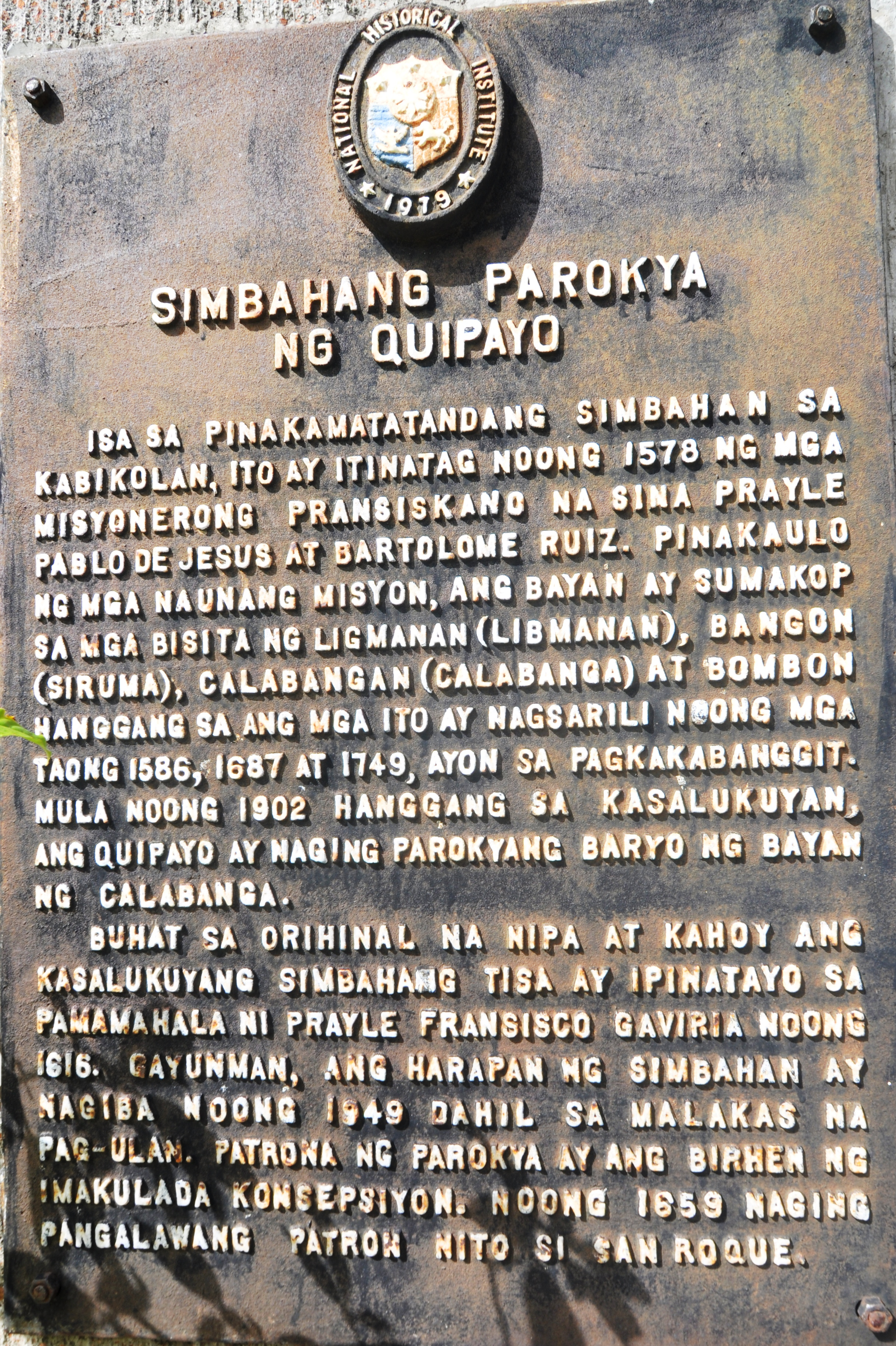
Church NHI historical marker installed in 1979

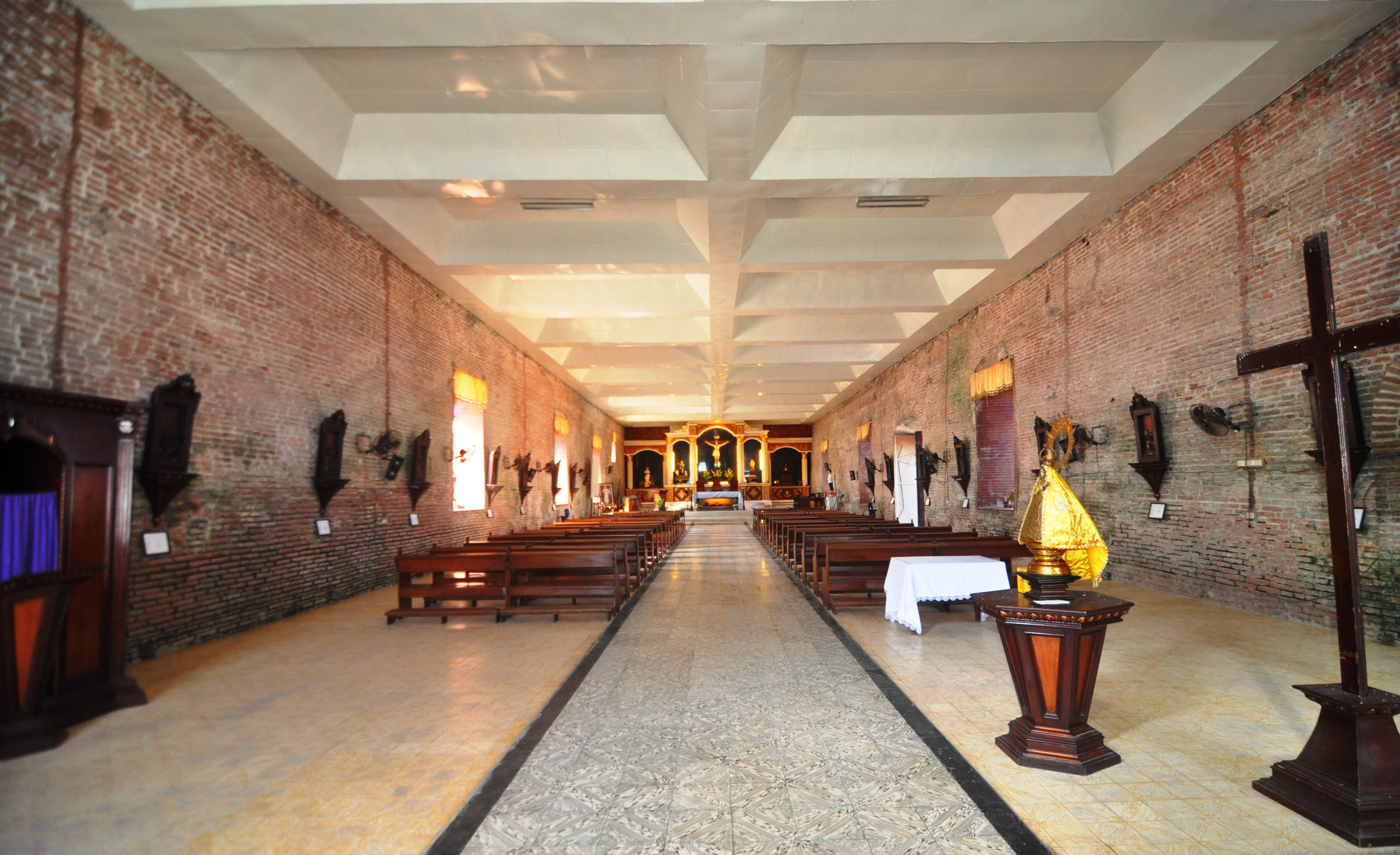
Church interior in 2014

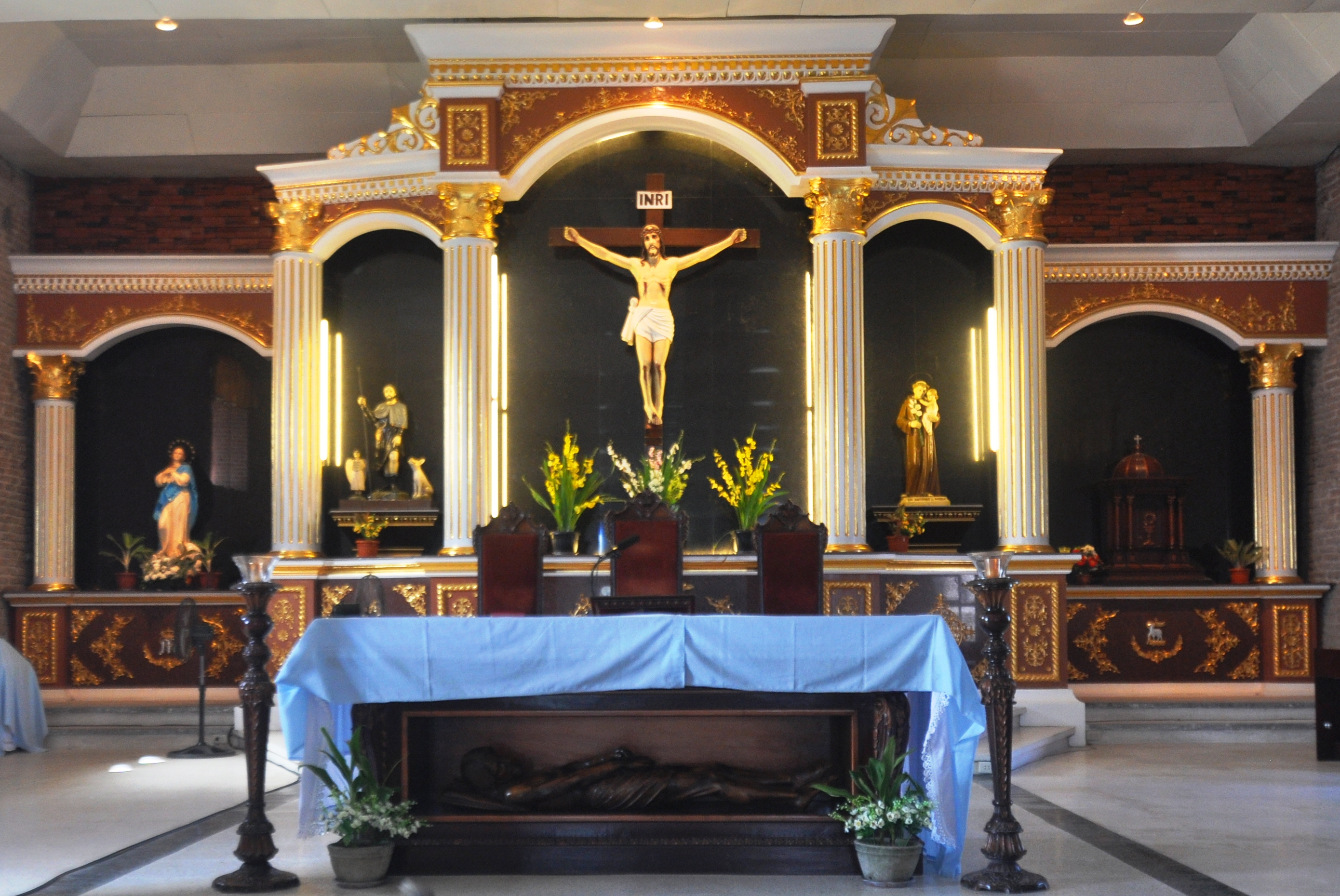
Altar

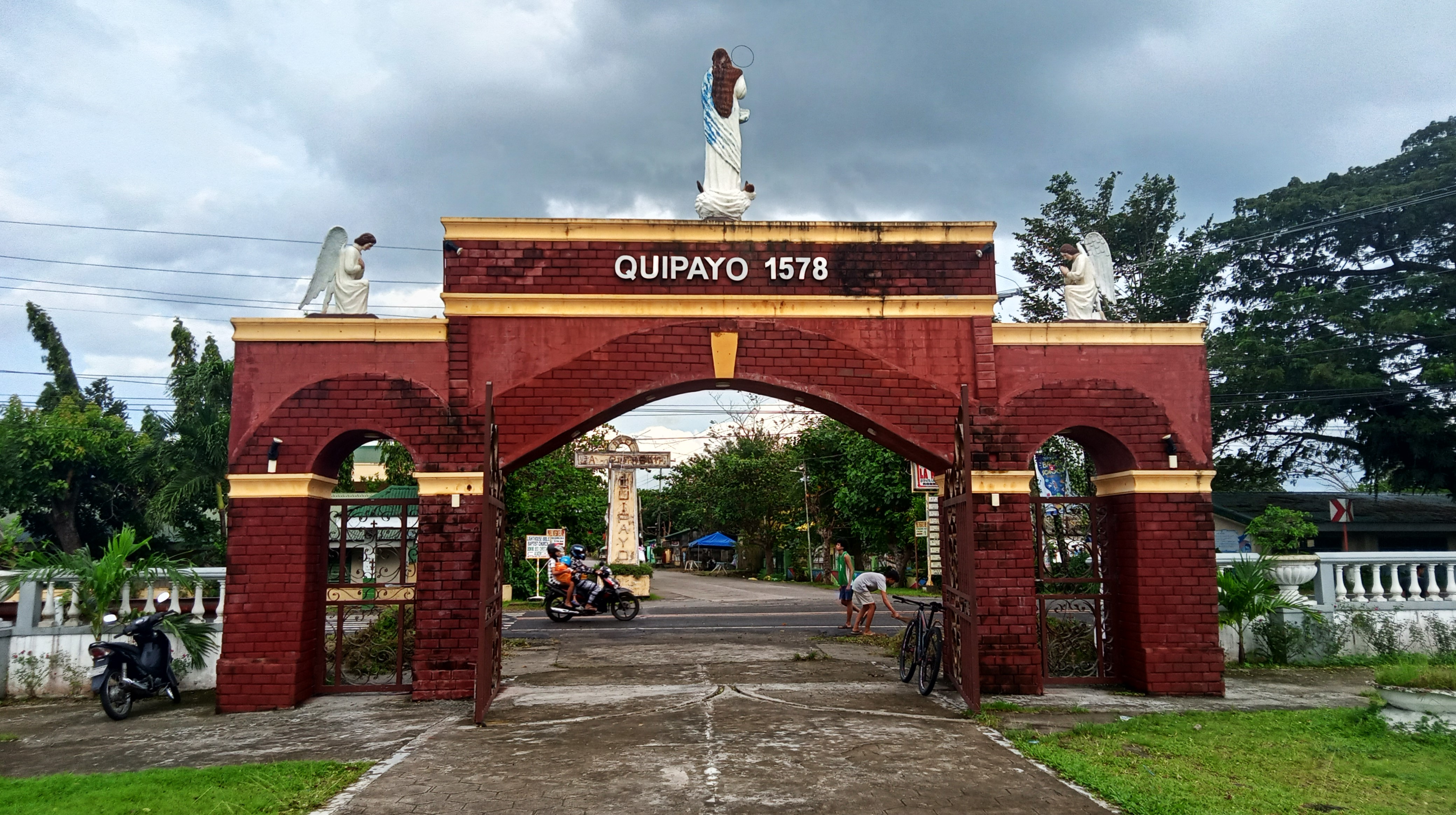
Church gate
