= Dalaguete =

Municipality in Cebu, Philippines

- Municipality
- Municipality of Dalaguete
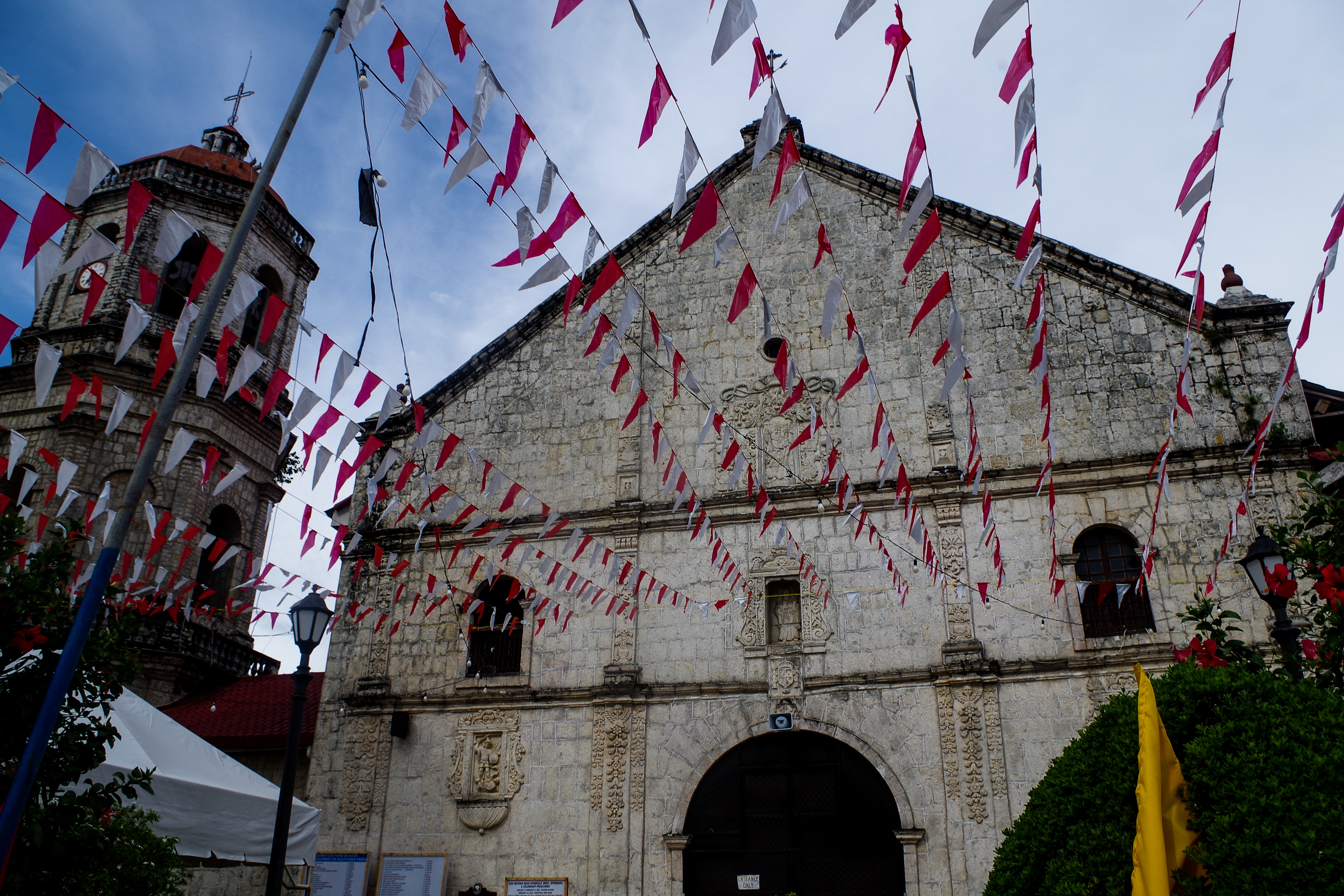
- St. William of Aquitaine Church

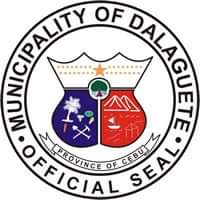
- Seal

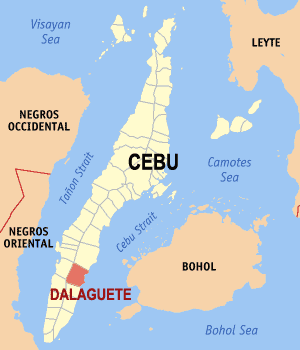
- Map of Cebu with Dalaguete highlighted
- Interactive map of Dalaguete
- Location within the Philippines
- Coordinates: 9°45′40″N 123°32′06″E
- Country: Philippines
- Region: Central Visayas
- Province: Cebu
- District: 2nd district
- Founded: 1711
- Barangays: 33 (see Barangays)

Government
  - Type: Sangguniang Bayan
  - Mayor: Nelin B. Tambis (PMP)
  - Vice Mayor: William O. Lagahid (1Cebu)
  - Representative: Edsel Galeos (Lakas)
  - Municipal Council: Members: Coca Nicohl O. Bustamante; Lowell O. Amaya; Ernesto M. Tangpos; Andrade H. Alcantara; John Ritz B. Osorio; Ricardo E. Villahermosa; Kevin V. Belandres; Joel S. Survilla
  - Electorate: 48,912 voters (2025)

Area
  - Total: 154.96 km^{2} (59.83 sq mi)
- Elevation: 84 m (276 ft)
- Highest elevation: 608 m (1,995 ft)
- Lowest elevation: 0 m (0 ft)

Population (2024 census)
  - Total: 75,937
  - Density: 490.04/km^{2} (1,269.2/sq mi)
  - Households: 17,201

Economy
  - Income class: 1st municipal income class
  - Poverty incidence: 26.53% (2023)
  - Revenue: ₱ 355 million (2024)
  - Assets: ₱ 1,092 million (2024)
  - Expenditure: ₱ 333.5 million (2024)
  - Liabilities: ₱ 267.8 million (2024)

Service provider
  - Electricity: Cebu 1 Electric Cooperative (CEBECO 1)
- Time zone: UTC+8 (PST)
- ZIP code: 6022
- PSGC: 072222000
- IDD : area code: +63 (0)32
- Native languages: Cebuano; Tagalog
- Website: dalaguete.gov.ph

Dalaguete, officially the Municipality of Dalaguete (Cebuano: Lungsod sa Dalaguete; Tagalog: Bayan ng Dalaguete), is a municipality in the province of Cebu, Philippines. According to the 2024 census, it has a population of 75,937 people.

== History ==
The dalakit (Ficus benjamina) tree is the foundation of the origin and name of Dalaguete.

The natives look upon the tree not for its gigantic size, nor for its fruit which is of no use, but rather for the religious observance of the natives.

— Alcina 1668

They highly consider this tree for their belief that it harbors spirits or diwatas who could impose sickness if maltreated or hand in fortunes and gifts if placated. When fully grown, the intertwining roots are exposed from the earth and form huge caverns that could house several people.

In ancient times, before the coming of the Spaniards, these trees had been used by people as major landmarks. People gathered under the encompassing shades and conduct social and economic activities such as festivities, contest, trading meetings, and other community gatherings. They establish market places under the shades of the dalaket where they sell their products and conduct trade with local roving traders bringing in Chinese and Asiatic goods from the port of Cebu.

The place where the church or the poblacion were laid would have been the site of a communal gathering area for the natives. It was also the abode of a huge dalakit tree which provide shade and shelter while people conduct their activities. "Adto ta mag-abot sa dalakit". "Adto ta magtigom-tigom sa dalakit" [Let us meet at the dalakit]. These and other phrases were common among locals of centuries past when coming up with an agreement to meet or conduct an activity specifically at the site where the dalakit is situated. For several generations in pre-Hispanic Dalaguete, the area has always been unofficially called as dalakit. Its accessibility and its reputation as a communal area for community gathering have prompted the Spanish authorities to construct the church and eventually establish the area as part of an encomienda. From this common ground, and from this tree, begun the conception of a larger town which later come to be known as Dalaguete.

== Geography ==
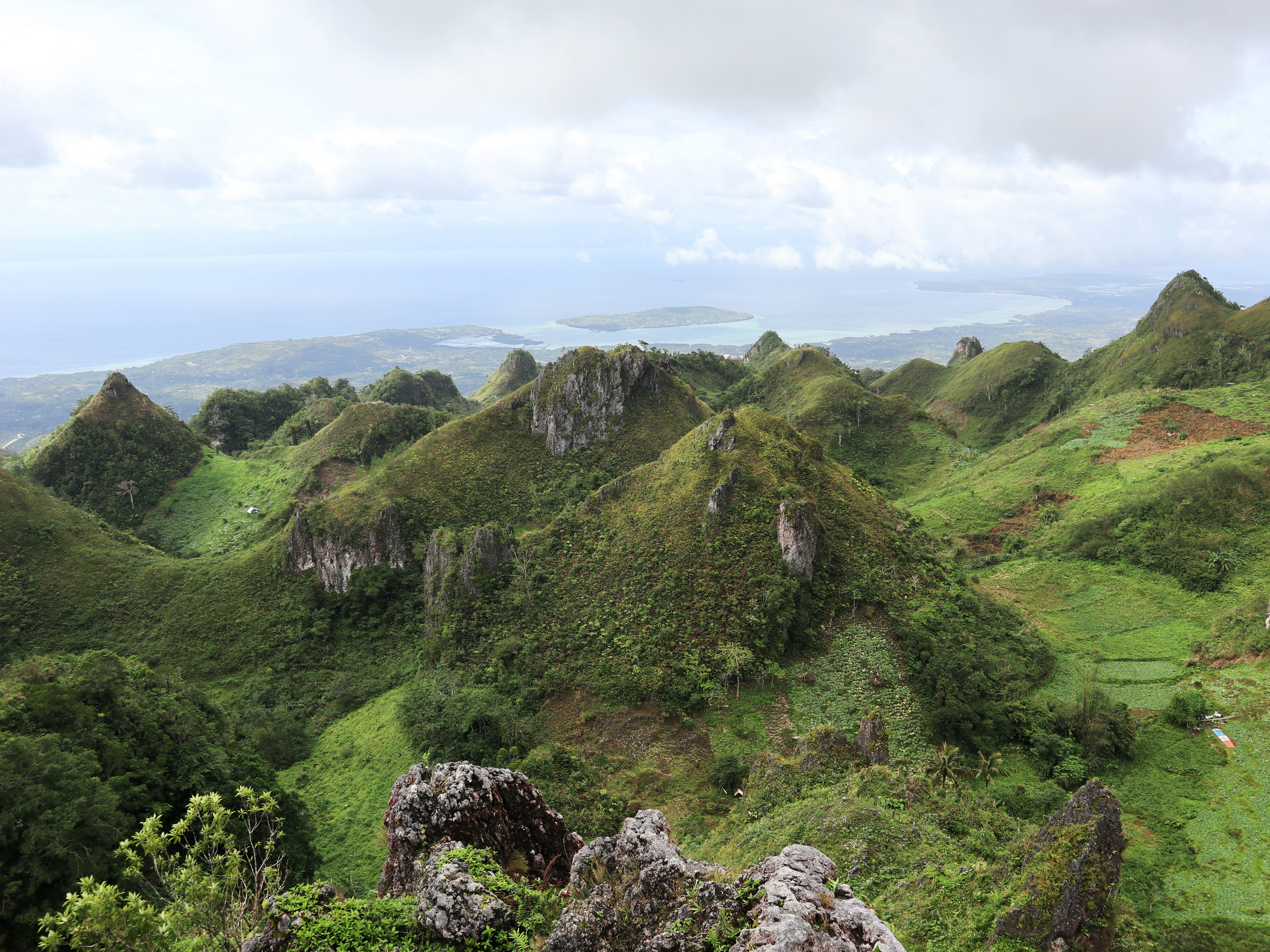
Osmeña peak in Brgy. Patong, Badian

Located 84 kilometers (52 mi) south of Cebu City, Dalaguete is bordered to the north by the town of Argao, to the west are the towns of Badian and Alegria, to the east is the Cebu Strait, and to the south is the town of Alcoy.

=== Land characteristics ===
- Land Area: 15,496 hectares (38,290 acres)
- Topography: 85% hilly and mountainous with more than 30% slope
- Land Use:
  - 45% protected area and watersheds
  - 30% agriculture (prime area for vegetable production in the province)
  - 6% built-up area (proj. 2010: 6 - 15%)

=== Climate ===
Climate data for Dalaguete, Cebu
Month	Jan	Feb	Mar	Apr	May	Jun	Jul	Aug	Sep	Oct	Nov	Dec	Year
Mean daily maximum °C (°F)	29 (84)	29 (84)	30 (86)	32 (90)	31 (88)	30 (86)	30 (86)	30 (86)	30 (86)	29 (84)	29 (84)	29 (84)	30 (86)
Mean daily minimum °C (°F)	23 (73)	23 (73)	23 (73)	24 (75)	25 (77)	25 (77)	24 (75)	24 (75)	24 (75)	24 (75)	24 (75)	23 (73)	24 (75)
Average precipitation mm (inches)	35 (1.4)	28 (1.1)	38 (1.5)	51 (2.0)	125 (4.9)	195 (7.7)	194 (7.6)	173 (6.8)	180 (7.1)	192 (7.6)	121 (4.8)	64 (2.5)	1,396 (55)
Average rainy days	9.2	8.2	9.9	11.3	22.5	27.3	28.0	27.2	27.1	26.9	19.7	12.7	230
Source: Meteoblue (modeled/calculated data, not measured locally)

Tropical climate prevails year round in Dalaguete. The temperature is high and varies little with a difference of about 3 °C (5.4 °F) between the coldest month which occurs around January and hottest month around May. The mountain barangays are cold and Mantalongon is considered the "Little Baguio of Cebu". Average daytime temperatures except in mountainous region range from 22.2 to 32.1 °C (72.0 to 89.8 °F). Humidity is 77%.

=== Barangays ===
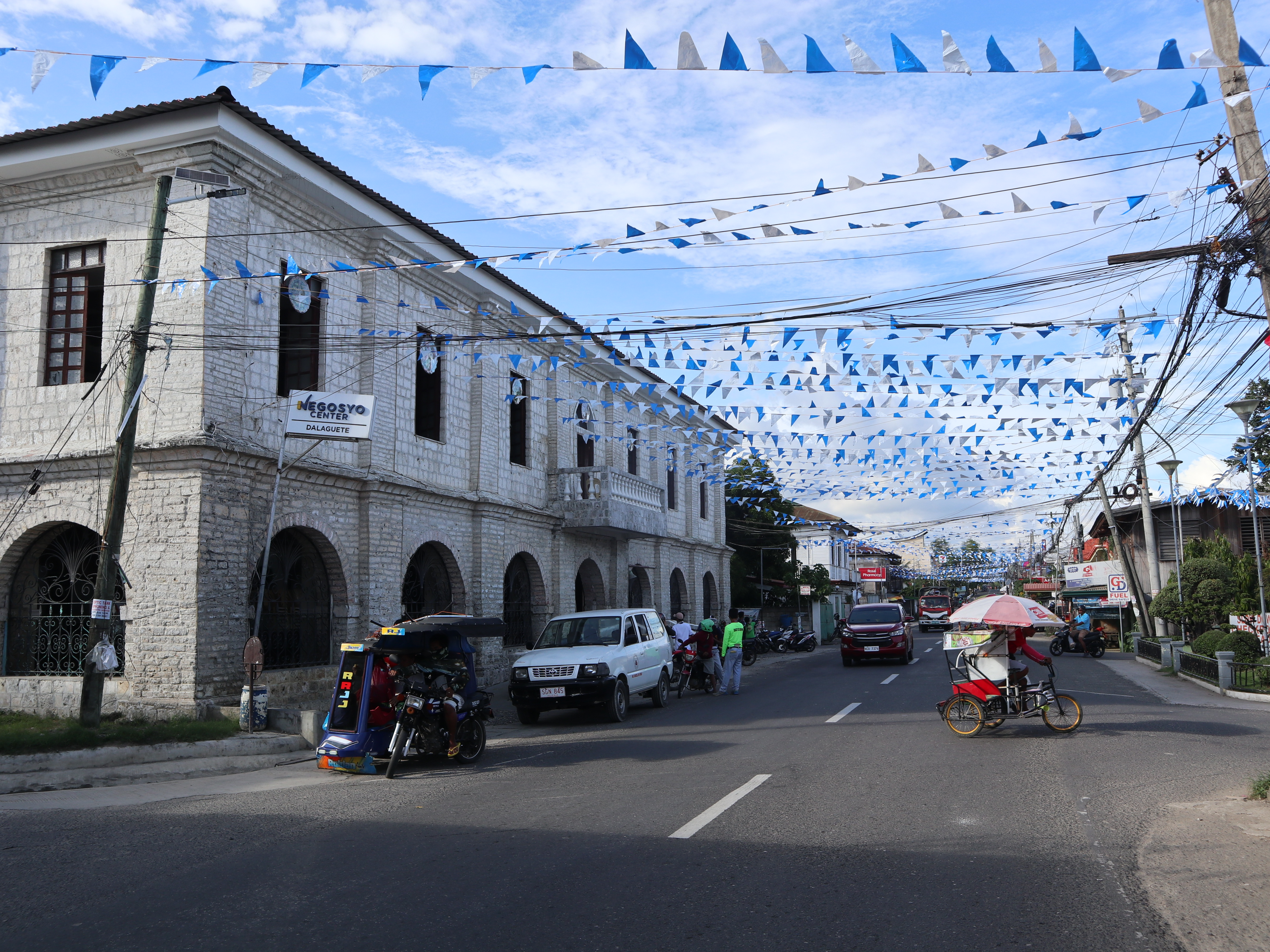
Dalaguete town proper

Dalaguete is politically subdivided into 33 barangays. Each barangay consists of puroks and some have sitios.

PSGC	Barangay	Population			±% p.a.		Area		PD 2024	
		2024		2010			ha	acre	/km^{2}	/sq mi
072222001	Ablayan	2.1%	1,612	1,146	▴	2.38%	450	1,112	360	930
072222002	Babayongan	0.6%	491	458	▴	0.48%	386	954	130	330
072222003	Balud	5.8%	4,371	3,044	▴	2.53%	128	316	3,400	8,800
072222004	Banhigan	1.8%	1,358	1,240	▴	0.63%	121	299	1,100	2,900
072222005	Bulak	1.2%	921	893	▴	0.21%	460	1,137	200	520
072222007	Caleriohan	4.1%	3,096	1,861	▴	3.58%	353	872	880	2,300
072222006	Caliongan	3.5%	2,652	2,298	▴	0.99%	889	2,197	300	770
072222008	Casay	6.5%	4,962	4,103	▴	1.32%	353	872	1,400	3,600
072222009	Catolohan	2.9%	2,201	1,587	▴	2.28%	945	2,335	230	600
072222010	Cawayan	3.7%	2,790	2,599	▴	0.49%	297	734	940	2,400
072222011	Consolacion	1.9%	1,441	1,561	▾	−0.55%	194	479	740	1,900
072222012	Coro	2.2%	1,671	1,019	▴	3.47%	264	652	630	1,600
072222013	Dugyan	1.3%	969	1,094	▾	−0.83%	308	761	310	810
072222014	Dumalan	2.3%	1,742	1,664	▴	0.32%	891	2,202	200	510
072222015	Jolomaynon	2.3%	1,731	1,458	▴	1.19%	469	1,159	370	960
072222016	Lanao	1.9%	1,441	1,094	▴	1.92%	575	1,421	250	650
072222017	Langkas	2.0%	1,510	1,191	▴	1.65%	326	806	460	1,200
072222018	Lumbang	1.2%	901	791	▴	0.90%	110	272	820	2,100
072222019	Malones	1.7%	1,292	1,145	▴	0.84%	237	586	550	1,400
072222020	Maloray	1.7%	1,297	918	▴	2.41%	433	1,070	300	780
072222021	Mananggal	1.2%	894	1,025	▾	−0.94%	166	410	540	1,400
072222023	Manlapay	2.6%	2,007	2,095	▾	−0.30%	526	1,300	380	990
072222024	Mantalongon	10.0%	7,617	5,238	▴	2.62%	917	2,266	830	2,200
072222025	Nalhub	2.5%	1,891	1,797	▴	0.35%	703	1,737	270	700
072222026	Obo	1.9%	1,440	1,651	▾	−0.94%	483	1,194	300	770
072222027	Obong	4.6%	3,459	3,277	▴	0.37%	940	2,323	370	950
072222028	Panas	1.0%	797	727	▴	0.64%	357	882	220	580
072222029	Poblacion	8.7%	6,612	5,893	▴	0.80%	144	356	4,600	12,000
072222030	Sacsac	2.3%	1,769	1,509	▴	1.10%	597	1,475	300	770
072222033	Salug	1.6%	1,220	1,003	▴	1.36%	372	919	330	850
072222034	Tabon	4.5%	3,384	3,056	▴	0.71%	510	1,260	660	1,700
072222031	Tapun	6.6%	5,048	3,577	▴	2.41%	202	499	2,500	6,500
072222032	Tuba	1.8%	1,350	1,227	▴	0.66%	940	2,323	140	370
	Total		75,937	63,239	▴	1.27%	15,496	38,291	490	14

== Demographics ==
Population census of Dalaguete
Year	Pop.	±% p.a.
1903	21,354	—
1918	26,904	+1.55%
1939	27,284	+0.07%
1948	29,333	+0.81%
1960	28,487	−0.24%
1970	31,834	+1.12%
1975	33,964	+1.31%
1980	37,076	+1.77%
1990	45,545	+2.08%
1995	48,778	+1.29%
2000	57,331	+3.52%
2007	61,405	+0.95%
2010	63,239	+1.08%
2015	67,497	+1.25%
2020	74,596	+2.13%
2024	75,937	+0.43%
Source: Philippine Statistics Authority

=== Religions ===
Roman Catholic Parishes	Protestant Churches	Independent (Non-Sectarian)
S. Guillermo de Aquitania, founded 1711 (Poblacion)	Faith Tabernacle Church (Poblacion)	Jehovah's Witnesses (Poblacion)
S. Isidro Labrador, founded 1958 (Mantalongon)	Assembly of God (Poblacion)	
Santa Monica, founded 1952 (Cawayan)	Evangelical Free Church (Poblacion)	
Our Lady of Consolation, founded 2012 (Manlapay)	Christ to the Philippines - Rock Group (Solong-on, Tapon)	

== Economy ==
Poverty incidence of Dalaguete (%)

Source: Philippine Statistics Authority

Dalaguete Public Market

- Agriculture: farming, fishing
- Products: vegetables, fish
- Cottage industry: blanket & mat weaving, basket making
- Mineral Resources: ice stones, lime red stone, lime pink stones, wood stones, phosphate, coal

== Utanon Festival ==
Dalaguete celebrates its annual town fiesta in honor of its patron saint, San Guillermo, every 9 and 10 February. One of the highlights of the celebration is the street dancing and showdown competition called "Utanon Festival".

Utanon Festival is also a form of thanksgiving for all the blessings and graces the Dalaguetenons have received from San Guillermo and for giving them a place so rich in agriculture and music. Utanon Festival is a celebration of good harvest through dance and music. The town is known as the "Vegetable Basket of Cebu" and Mantalongon as the "Summer Capital of Cebu".

== Education ==
The public schools in the town of Dalaguete are administered by two school districts under the Schools Division of Cebu Province.

Elementary schools:

- Ablayan Elementary School — Ablayan
- Amonsao Elementary School — Sitio Amonsao, Catolohan
- Babayongan Elementary School — Babayongan
- Balud Elementary School — Balud
- Banhigan Elementary School — Banhigan
- Bulak Elementary School — Bulak
- Caleriohan Elementary School — Caleriohan
- Caliongan Elementary School — Caliongan
- Cancabalong Elementary School — Sitio Cancabalong, Obo
- Canlawilao Elementary School — Sitio Canlawilao, Dumalan
- Casay Elementary School — Casay
- Catambisan Elementary School — Sitio Catambisan, Mantalongon
- Catolohan Elementary School — Catolohan
- Cawayan Central Elementary School — Cawayan
- Consolacion Elementary School — Consolacion
- Coro Elementary School — Coro
- Dalaguete Central Elementary School — Osmeña Avenue, Poblacion
- Dugyan Elementary School — Dugyan
- Dumalan Elementary School — Dumalan
- Jolomaynon Elementary School — Jolomaynon
- Karatagan Elementary School — Sitio Karatagan, Caliongan
- Lanao Elementary School — Lanao
- Langkas Elementary School — Langkas
- Libo Primary School — Sitio Libo, Catolohan
- Lugsangan Elementary School — Sitio Lugsangan, Tabon
- Lumbang Elementary School — Lumbang
- Malones Elementary School — Malones
- Maloray Elementary School — Maloray
- Manangal Elementary School — Mananggal
- Manlapay Elementary School — Manlapay
- Mantalongon Elementary School — Mantalongon
- Nalhub Elementary School — Nalhub
- Obo Elementary School — Obo
- Obong Elementary School — Obong
- Panaguikan Elementary School — Sitio Panaguikan, Tapon
- Panas Elementary School — Panas
- Sacsac Elementary School — Sacsac
- Salug Elementary School — Salug
- Sampig Elementary School — Sitio Sampig, Mantalongon
- Tabon Elementary School — Tabon
- Tuba Elementary School — Sitio Amonsao, Catolohan
- Tubod Elementary School — Sitio Tubod, Obong

High schools:

- Caleriohan National High School — Caleriohan
- Caliongan National High School — Caliongan
- Casay National High School — Casay
- Cawayan National High School — Cawayan
- Dalaguete National High School — Poblacion
- Dumalan National High School — Dumalan
- Manlapay National High School — Manlapay
- Mantalongon National High School — Mantalongon

College/University

- University of the Visayas - Dalaguete Campus — Pedro Calungsod Street, Poblacion

== Sources ==
- Alcina, Fr Francisco Ignacio (1668). Historia natural del sitio, fertilidad y calidad de las Islas e Indios de Bisayas (in Spanish).
