= Pila Church =

Roman Catholic church in Laguna, Philippines

- National Shrine and Parish of San Antonio de Padua
- Santuario Nacional y Iglesia Parroquia de San Antonio de Padua (Spanish); Pambansang Dambana at Parokya ni San Antonio de Padua (Filipino)
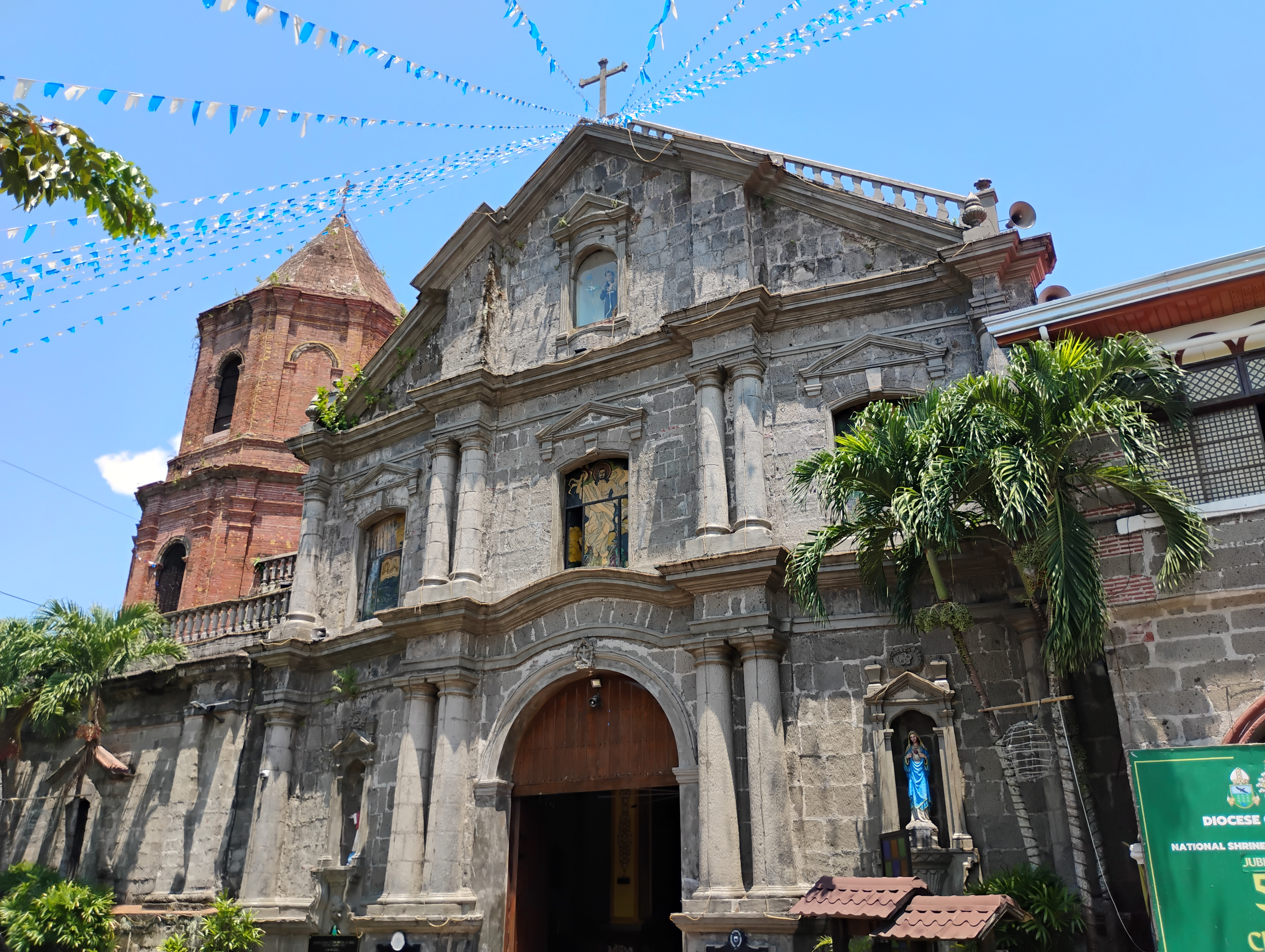
- Church facade in 2026

- Location in Laguna Location in Luzon Location in the Philippines
- 14°14′02″N 121°21′52″E
- Location: Poblacion, Pila, Laguna
- Country: Philippines
- Denomination: Roman Catholic

History
- Status: National shrine and Parish church (2002)
- Founded: 1578
- Founder(s): Juan de Plasencia and Diego de Oropesa
- Dedication: Anthony of Padua
- Dedicated: 1581 (as Parish)

Architecture
- Functional status: Active
- Architectural type: Church building
- Style: Baroque
- Completed: 1849

Specifications
- Materials: Sand, gravel, cement, and bricks

Administration
- Province: Manila
- Diocese: San Pablo
- Deanery: San Antonio de Padua
- Parish: San Antonio de Padua

Clergy
- Rector: Emil Urriquia
- Vicar: Daniel Joshua Bague

The National Shrine and Parish of San Antonio de Padua, commonly known as the Church of Pila, is a Roman Catholic national shrine dedicated to Saint Anthony of Padua in the Philippines in 1578 and the first Antonine parish church in the Philippines in 1581 and probably in Asia. It is under the jurisdiction of the Diocese of San Pablo. In 1606 the Franciscans set up the second printing press of the Philippines under the supervision of Tomás Pinpín and Domingo Loag. Its titular is Anthony of Padua, whose feast is celebrated every June 13.

== History ==
=== Establishment of parish ===
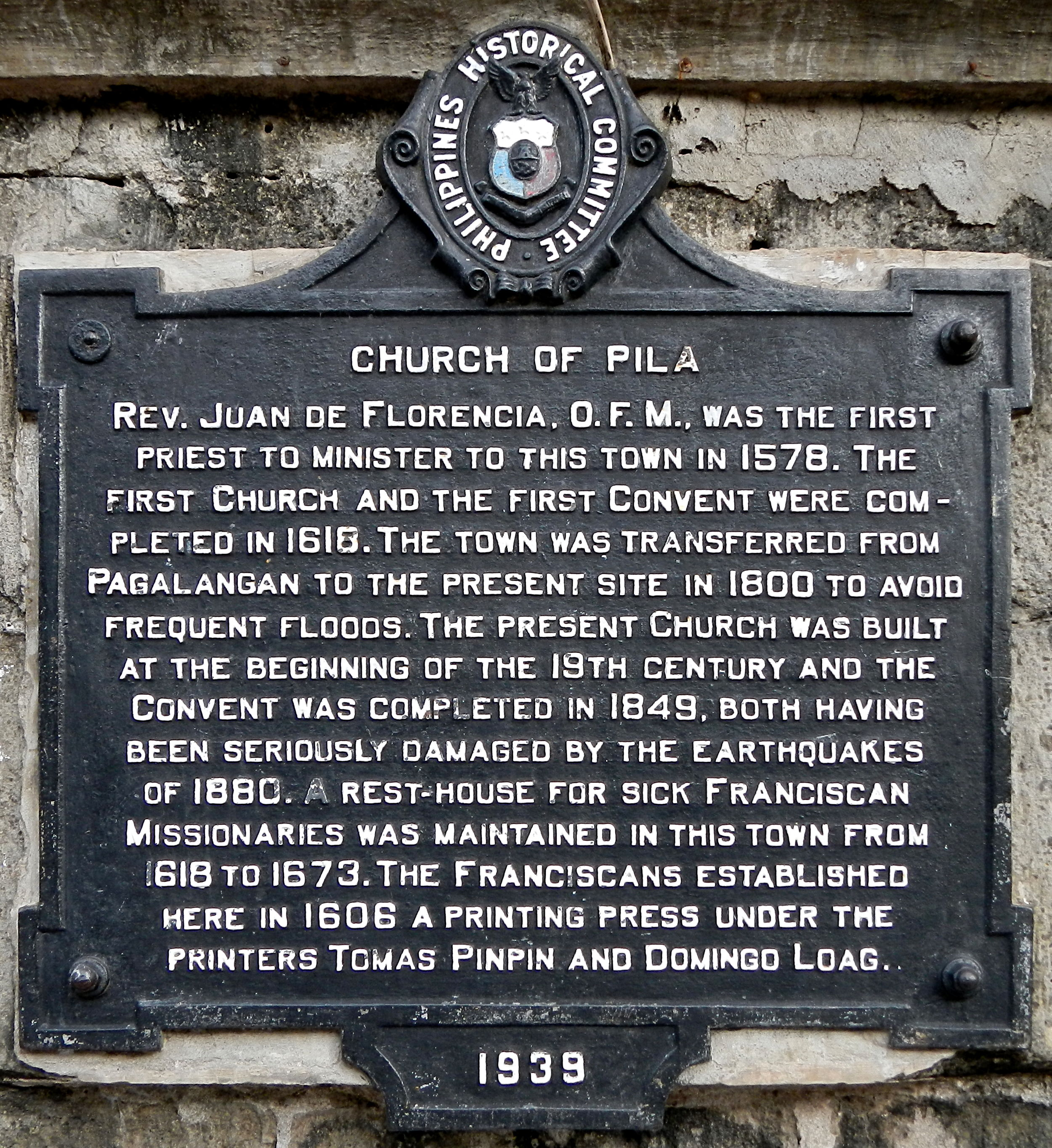
Church PHC historical marker installed in 1939

The first missionaries in Pila were Augustinians who administered their missions from Bay. The Franciscans then started to evangelize the townsmen of Pila through Fray Juan de Plasencia and Fray Diego de Oropesa de San José (known as the Apostles of Laguna and Tayabas) in 1578. They started to establish "Villa de Pila" and soon built a church out of cane, dedicated to Saint Anthony of Padua. From being a reducción, Pila was elevated to a parish on the feast of its titular on June 13, 1581, with Fray Oropesa as its pastor (parish priest) until 1583. With its establishment, Pila became the first church dedicated to Saint Anthony in the country. The Spanish colonial authorities gave Pila the title La Noble Villa de Pila. In 1599 permission was given by the Superior Gobierno to build a stone church. In 1617 the stone church and rectory was finished in Pagalangan (place of reverence).

=== Printing press ===
The Franciscans established the second printing press in the Philippines in 1606. The first Tagalog dictionary, Vocabulario de la lengua tagala, by local pastor Pedro de San Buenaventura was printed here in 1613 by Tomás Pinpín and Domingo Loag. The dictionary was used to facilitate the evangelization of the Tagalog region.

=== Infirmary at Pila ===
An infirmary run by male Franciscan religious from Lumban was transferred to Pila in 1618, and in 1673 transferred to the town of Santa Cruz. About 75 Franciscan missionaries retired and died at Pila's infirmary, and were buried at the local cemetery. These included Fray Miguel de Talavera (died 1622), a prolific writer in Tagalog, and Fray Blás de la Madre de Diós (died 1626), ex-provincial and author of the earliest Flora de Filipinas, Manila Archbishop Fernando Montero de Espinosa, newly arrived from Madrid, also died here in 1644 on his way to take possession of his see.

=== Ancient bell ===
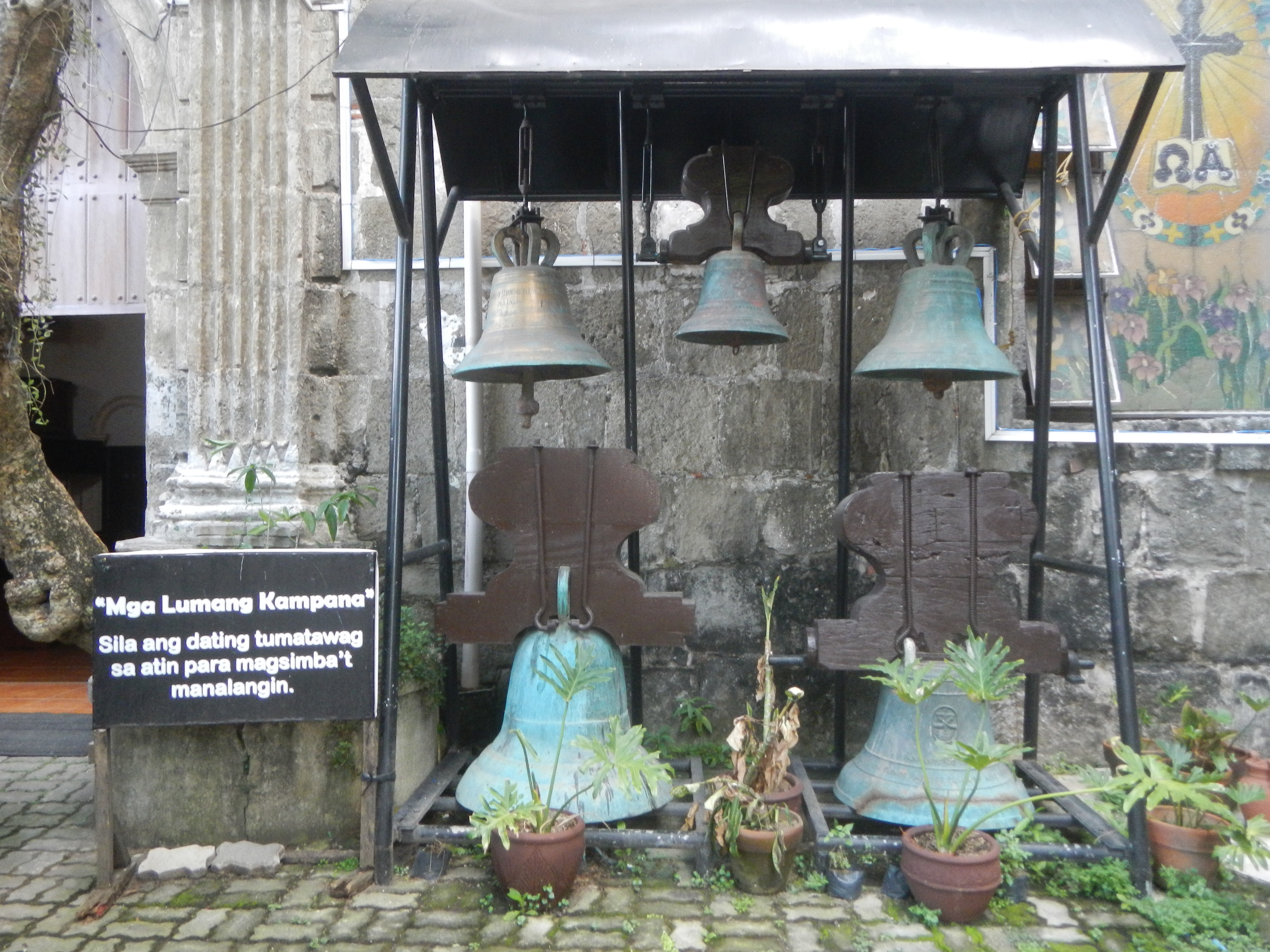
The church's five old bells

The oldest surviving church bell of Pila was cast on the centenary of the parish in 1681 with the Franciscan emblem and the inscription "San Antonio de Pila". It survived British invaders in 1762 when the people of Pila submerged it in Laguna de Bay facing the church. It is now the third-oldest church bell in the Philippines. When a new stone belfry was built in 1890, the parish recast an undated old bell in honor of Anthony of Padua in 1893. Today, the oldest bell of Pila is at the church convent.

=== Transfer ===
Due to flooding in Pagalangan (today's Victoria), the church and rectory were demolished and transferred to their current site in Sta. Clara in 1800. The land where the Pila Church and Municipal Hall of Pila stands was donated by Felizardo Rivera, the recognized founder of Pila. The buildings were constructed under the direction of Fray Antonio de Argobejo and Fray Domingo de Valencia, the town contributing for it. Due to controversies surrounding the transfer of the church, the relocation took almost two decades to complete.

=== Secular priests ===
From 1812 to 1835 Filipino secular priests served as acting pastors of Pila due to a shortage of Franciscan priests. These include Fray Lorenzo Samaniego (1812–1816); Pedro de los Santos (1816–1819); Pedro Alcántara (1819–1826); and Rudecindo Aquino (1826–1835). The present church and convent was built in 1849 by Antonio Argobejo and Domingo de Valencia. Both structure were badly damaged during the 1880 earthquake, in which the bell tower toppled. The bell tower was reconstructed by Damaso Bolanos and finished by Francisco de Santa Olalia, and again rebuilt by Lope Toledo. The present rectory or convent (casa parroquial) is made of stone, constructed under the direction of Benito del Quintanar in the 1840s.

Fray Benito also started the Archicofradía del Nuestro Señor Padre San Francisco which was next in rank to the Venerable Orden Tercera (VOT) of the Franciscan Order. The religious festival of Flores de Mayo, for which Pila is now well known, was introduced in 1888 by Fray Benito de los Infantes.

In 1855, plans for a concrete belfry were drawn by the local architect and builder Maestro Sebastián Bade and was built after the 1863 earthquake.

=== The 1896 Revolution and US occupation ===
From being a calm town, Pila including the parish experienced upheavals from 1896 during the Spanish revolution until the American occupation in 1902. American soldiers used the belfry and convent of Pila church for more than a year. At this time, church properties were destroyed and looted.

The first monument to the Sacred Heart of Jesus in the province of Laguna was inaugurated at the Pila Plaza during the town fiesta in 1922.

=== Twentieth century ===
During World War II the town was not bombed, unlike neighboring towns such as Santa Cruz and Pagsanjan. The parish was transferred from the Archdiocese of Manila to the Diocese of Lipa when the latter was erected in 1910, and finally, to the newly established Diocese of San Pablo in 1966.

The Diocese of San Pablo dedicated the parish church of Pila as the Diocesan Shrine of San Antonio de Padua on July 9, 2002. It was led by Francisco San Diego, former Bishop of San Pablo, in the presence of Cardinal Ricardo Vidal. Many devotees came from nearby places.

The church was elevated to a national shrine on April 23, 2019, becoming the first church under the jurisdiction of the San Pablo Diocese to receive such status and the 25th shrine in the Philippines. The solemn declaration was led by Archbishop Romulo Valles, CBCP President.

== Architectural features ==
The church has a three-level facade with classical Doric columns. At the pediment is a niche reserved for Saint Anthony. Windows of the choir loft can be seen at the second level while niches for the statues of the Sacred Heart of Jesus and the Immaculate Heart of Mary are found at the lowest level. The semicircular arched doorway has the Franciscan seal on top. On the right side of the church is the convent, now used as a school building for Liceo de Pila, while a square based octagonal bell tower is on the left side.

Nave and sanctuary

Convent building (Liceo de Pila)

Sacred Heart of Jesus statue

The church and town plaza

== Pila historical town ==
The church complex of San Antonio de Padua is part of the Pila Historic Town Center together with the town center of Pila, and 35 old houses and buildings which were proclaimed as a National Historical Landmark by the National Historical Institute (NHI) on May 17, 2000, by NHI Resolution no. 2, series of 2000.

== Notable religious from Pila ==
- Sor Assumpta (the former Miss Magdalena Alava y Bartolome) and Sor Consuelo (the former Miss Milagros Relova y Rivera), the first nuns from Pila who joined the "Pink Sisters" of the Perpetual Adoration and the Benedictine order respectively in 1932
- Félix Codera, first priest from Pila, ordained in 1938
- Ricardo Vidal, Cardinal and Archbishop-Emeritus of Cebu

== In popular culture ==
The church of Pila was featured on The Amazing Race Asia 2 in 2007 and in the ABS-CBN television drama Be Careful with my Heart.

== Bibliography ==
- Santiago, Luciano. "Sinaunang Pila: Mula Pailah sa Pinagbayanan hanggang Pagalangan" (PDF). Ang Saysay ng Inskripsyon sa Binatbat na Tanso ng Laguna. Bagong Kasaysayan, Inc. pp. 249–286. Archived from the original (PDF) on August 22, 2017.
- Huerta, Felix de (1865). Estado geográfico, topográfico, estadístico, histórico-religioso: de la santa y apostólica provincia de S. Gregorio Magno, de religiosos Menores descalzos de la regular y más estrecha observancia de N.S.P.S. Francisco, en las Islas Filipinas: comprende el número de religiosos, conventos, pueblos, situación de estos, años de su fundación, tributos, almas, producciones, industrias, cosas y casos especiales de su administración espiritual, en el archipiélago filipino, desde su fundación en el año de 1577 hasta el de 1865 [Geographical, topographical, statistical, historical and religious state of the holy and apostolic province of S. Gregorio Magno] (in Spanish). Binondo: Imprenta de M. Sanchez y Ca.
