= Leyte Provincial Capitol =

Capitol building of Leyte province in the Philippines

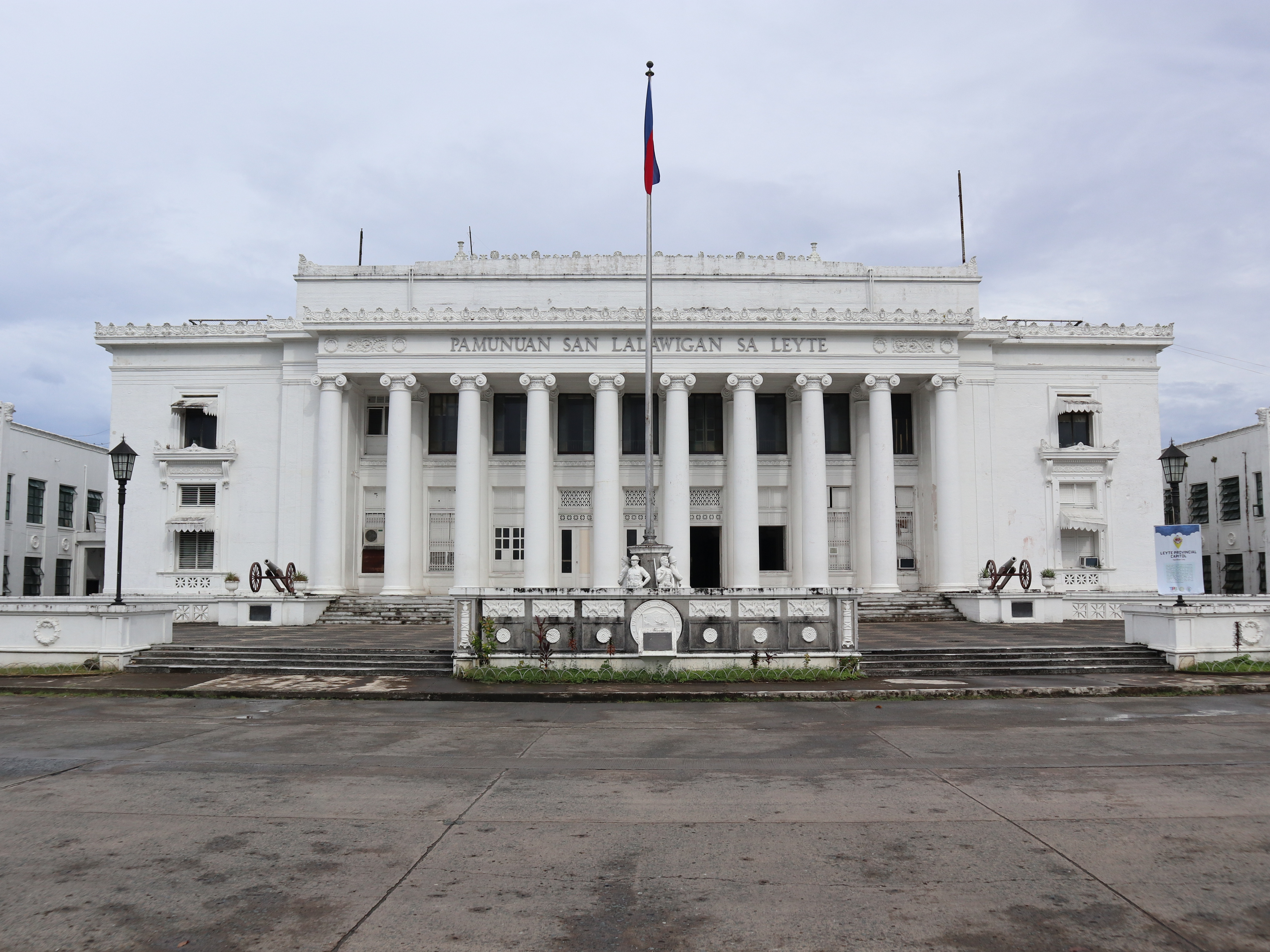
- Building façade in 2022

- Location within Visayas Location within Philippines

General information
- Architectural style: Neoclassical
- Location: Tacloban, Philippines
- Coordinates: 11°15′02″N 125°00′14″E
- Construction started: 1917
- Completed: 1924
- Renovated: 1964, 2019
- Owner: Provincial Government of Leyte

Design and construction
- Architect: Antonio Mañalac Toledo

National Historical Landmarks
- Official name: Capitol Building of the Philippines, 1944–1945
- Designated: 1950

The Leyte Provincial Capitol was the seat of government of the Philippine province of Leyte until 2019. The historic building situated in Tacloban also served as the temporary national capitol from 1944 to 1945 during the World War II era.

== History ==
The Leyte Provincial Capitol in Tacloban dates back to the American colonial administration. The construction of the building began in 1917 during the administration of then-Leyte Governor Salvador Demeterio and was completed and inaugurated in 1924 during the tenure of Leyte Governor Honorio López.

Antonio Mañalac Toledo designed the building in a neoclassical style, featuring a colonnade with two rows of ten Ionic columns. Sculptor Vidal Tampinco executed the ornamental details and reliefs. The capitol complex hosts a main structure with a legislative building behind it.

During the World War II era, the building sustained damage when the Imperial Japanese forces occupied the Philippines in the 1940s. The building also became the seat of the Philippine Commonwealth government from October 23, 1944, to February 27, 1945, as the Allied forces liberated the Philippine islands from Japanese control. Sergio Osmeña was sworn in as President by American general Douglas MacArthur inside the building.

The capitol underwent renovations in 1964 during the tenure of then-Leyte Governor Norberto Romualdez Jr.

During the administration of Leyte Governor Leopoldo Petilla, there were plans to move to seat of government of Leyte to Palo after Tacloban was elevated into a highly urbanized city. In 2013, the building was hit by storm surges caused by Typhoon Haiyan, which was locally known as Super Typhoon Yolanda in the Philippines. In 2015, Governor Petilla expressed plans to convert the building into a museum while still retaining the capitol as a meeting place for dignitaries.

In May 2019, the provincial government of Leyte, under the administration of Governor Leopoldo Petilla, abandoned the capitol after it sustained further damage due to the magnitude 6.4 Visayas earthquake of April 23, 2019. Even if retrofitting has been made on the building, the Leyte government decided to pursue its plans of building a new capitol in Palo and convert the original capitol into a museum.

It has been declared a National Historical Landmark

== See also ==
- Philippines National Historical Landmarks
