= Felix Y. Manalo National Historical Landmark =

Memorial and plaza in Taguig, Philippines

- Felix Manalo Shrine; Felix Manalo Birthplace
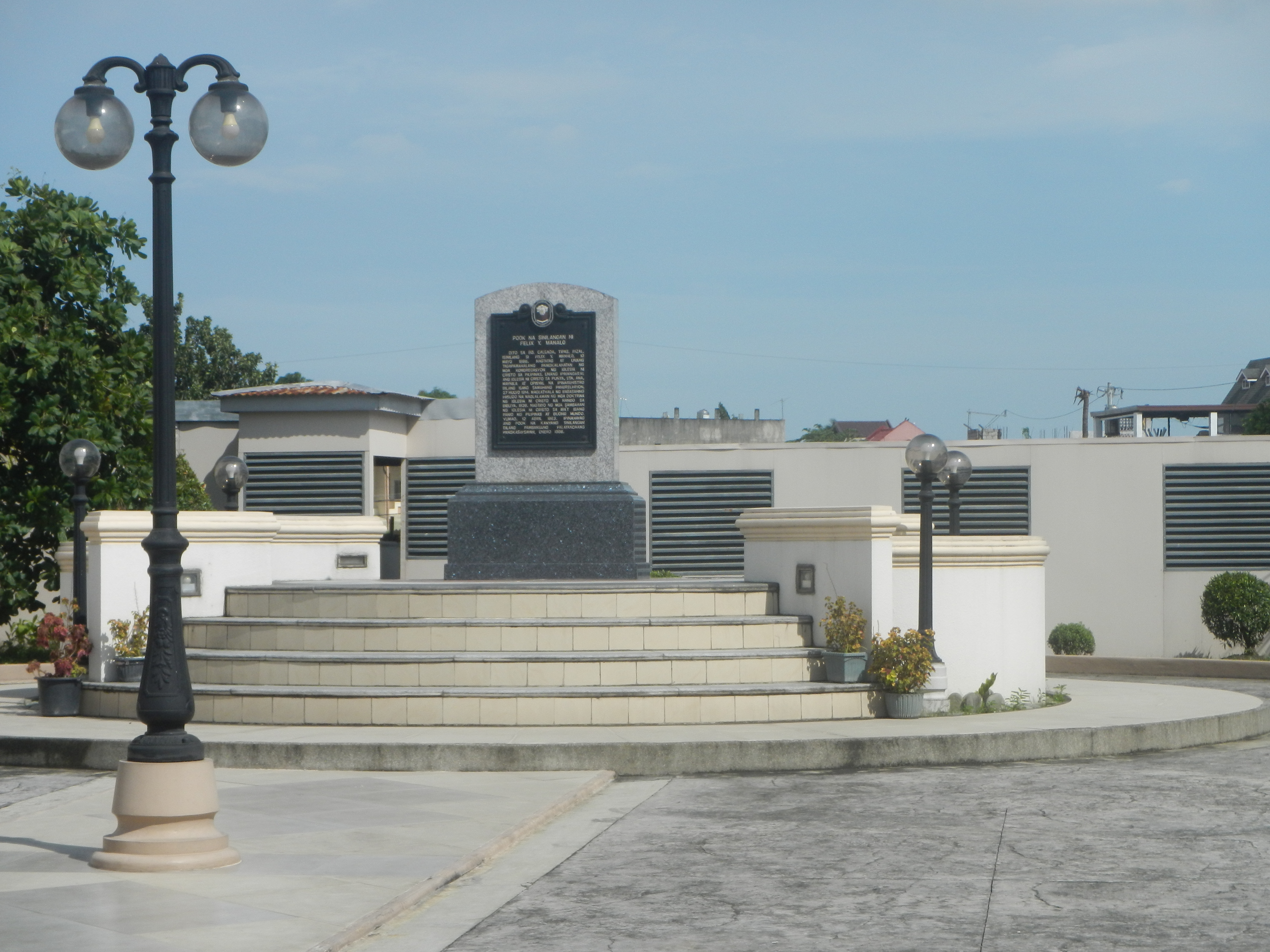
- Area: 744 square meters (8,010 sq ft)
- Dedicated to: Felix Manalo
- Location: Taguig, Metro Manila, Philippines
- Interactive map of Felix Y. Manalo National Historical Landmark
- Coordinates: 14°32′01″N 121°04′46″E

The Felix Y. Manalo National Historical Landmark, also known as the Felix Manalo Shrine, is a memorial and plaza in Calzada-Tipas, Taguig, Philippines. It is recognized by the country as a National Historical Landmark. The site marks the birthplace of the Iglesia ni Cristo founder and leader Felix Manalo.

== Background ==
The Felix Y. Manalo National Historical Landmark is a 744 square meters (8,010 sq ft) plaza situated in Barangay Calzada in Taguig, Philippines. The site marks the birthplace of Felix Manalo who was born on May 10, 1886, at the time Taguig was still a town that is part of Rizal province. Manalo is widely regarded by non-members as the founder of Iglesia ni Cristo (Note: In Iglesia ni Cristo theology, Jesus Christ is regarded as the founder of the church) who registered the church with the Philippine government in 1914. The area where the landmark stands is believed to be the site of the former ancestral house of Manalo's family.

Manalo's birthplace was proclaimed as a National Historical Landmark by the National Historical Institute on January 6, 1986.
