= Pila Historic Town Center =

Historic district in Laguna, Philippines

- Makasaysayang Kabayanan ng Pila (Tagalog)
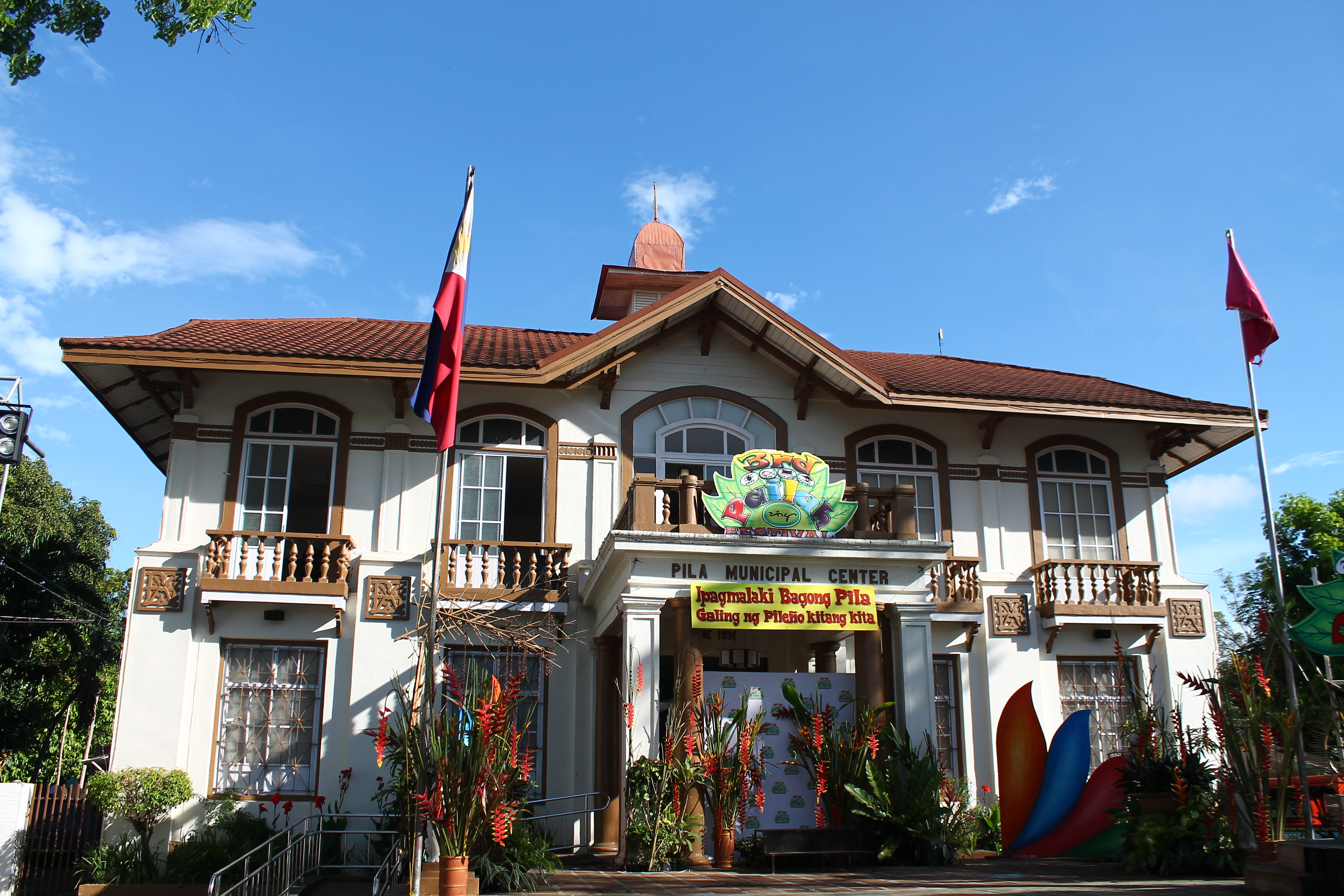
- Erected in June 1931, the Pila Municipal Center is one of the well-preserved heritage buildings found in the Pila Historic Town Center

- Location within Philippines
- 14°14′01.6″N 121°21′52″E
- Location: Pila, Laguna, Philippines

Site notes
- Governing body: Municipal Government of Pila

The Pila Historic Town Center is a historic district located at Barangay Santa Clara Norte, Pila, Laguna, Philippines. The district preserves examples of Spanish and American-era architecture found in its town proper laid out with the Spanish colonial town planning system for the Indies and is also a pre-Hispanic archaeological site. The National Historical Institute (now the National Historical Commission of the Philippines) declared a specific portion of Pila as a National Historical Landmark in 2000. The town has been recognized by scholars as a possible contender in UNESCO as a World Heritage Site.

== Rationale for Declaration as Historic Town Center ==
The NHI board resolution cites several reasons for the declaration of certain areas in downtown Pila as National Historical Landmark:

- The present-day town of Pila is a pre-Hispanic center of culture and trade in the Laguna area as proven by clay potteries unearthed in an archaeological site in Pinagbayanan in 1967;
- Spaniards used to refer to Pila as La Noble Villa de Pila in reference to its well-mannered citizens and rich culture;
- As of writing, Pila is one of the few, existing towns in the Philippines following the Spanish colonial town planning system with the town center being the plaza complex surrounded by government and religious infrastructure; and
- Pila features a collection of well-preserved of Spanish and American-era houses, government structures, and church.

== Declared Areas ==
According to the board resolution, the following streets in Brgy. Santa Clara Norte are identified as part of Pila Historic Town Center:

Street Name	Barangay
General Luna Street (North boundary)	Santa Clara Norte
Oca Street	Santa Clara Norte
Rivera Street	Santa Clara Norte
San Antonio Street	Santa Clara Norte
Ruiz Street	Santa Clara Norte
De Castro Street	Santa Clara Norte
Mabini Street (South boundary)	Santa Clara Norte
Bonifacio Street (West boundary)	Santa Clara Norte
Burzagom Street	Santa Clara Norte
M. H. Del Pilar Street (East boundary)	Santa Clara Norte

== Notable Built Heritage ==
Cultural Property wmph identifier (Note: wmph is an internal identifier used by Wikimedia Philippines to identify the monument. This is not an official identifier, and only shown temporarily in the templates until the government creates an updated complete list.)	Site name	Description	Province	City or municipality	Address	Coordinates	Image
	National Shrine and Parish Church of San Antonio de Padua	First Antonine parish in the Philippines; A 19th-century, Baroque church built by Franciscan Friars who established the parish in 1578	Laguna	Pila	Poblacion	14°14′01″N 121°21′52″E	Upload file
	Liceo de Pila	Formerly used as church convent	Laguna	Pila	Poblacion	14°14′02″N 121°21′51″E	Upload file
	Spanish era bridge		Laguna	Pila	Victoria Pila Road, Riverside, Brgy. Santa Clara Norte	14°13′57″N 121°21′32″E	Upload file
	Spanish era well	Built in 1886	Laguna	Pila	Brgy. Santa Clara Norte	14°14′08″N 121°21′40″E	Upload file
	Pinagbayanan Crematorium	Site of the oldest crematorium in the Philippines	Laguna	Pila	Brgy. Pinagbayanan	14°15′02″N 121°21′41″E	Upload file
	Juan Fuentes / Romana Santiago House	Currently owned by the Natividad	Laguna	Pila	Bonifacio corner General Luna Streets, Brgy. Santa Clara Norte	14°14′09″N 121°21′43″E	Upload file
	Angel Natividad House		Laguna	Pila	Bonifacio Street, Brgy. Santa Clara Norte	14°14′08″N 121°21′44″E	Upload file
	Payra House		Laguna	Pila	Bonifacio Street, Brgy. Santa Clara Norte	14°14′06″N 121°21′45″E	Upload file
	Leaven of the Immaculate Heart of Mary (LIHM) Formation House	Also known as the Casto Maceda-Concha Monserrat House. It is the ancestral and childhood home of José Maceda, National Artist of the Philippines for Music	Laguna	Pila	304 Bonifacio Street, Brgy. Santa Clara Norte	14°14′05″N 121°21′45″E	Upload file
	Madrigal House	Built in the 1920s	Laguna	Pila	#287 Bonifacio corner Rivera Streets, Brgy. Santa Clara Norte	14°14′04″N 121°21′46″E	Upload file
	Ramos House	Built in the 1930s	Laguna	Pila	Bonifacio corner Rivera Streets, Brgy. Santa Clara Norte	14°14′04″N 121°21′46″E	Upload file
	Escueta House		Laguna	Pila	Bonifacio corner Rivera Streets, Brgy. Santa Clara Norte	14°14′04″N 121°21′46″E	Upload file
	Unknown House		Laguna	Pila	#159 Rivera Street, Brgy. Santa Clara Norte	14°14′03″N 121°21′44″E	Upload file
	Banka House		Laguna	Pila	#162 Rivera corner Balagtas Streets, Brgy. Santa Clara Norte	14°14′03″N 121°21′44″E	Upload file
	Magdalene Endaya House		Laguna	Pila	#305 Bonifacio Street, Brgy. Santa Clara Sur	14°14′00″N 121°21′48″E	Upload file
	Natividad House		Laguna	Pila	#307 Bonifacio Street, Brgy. Santa Clara Sur	14°14′00″N 121°21′48″E	Upload file
	Unknown Ruined House	Built in 1926	Laguna	Pila	#028 Purok 7, Bonifacio Street, Brgy. Santa Clara Sur	14°13′57″N 121°21′49″E	Upload file
	Narciso Piedad House	Built in 1965	Laguna	Pila	#342 Bonifacio Street, Brgy. Santa Clara Sur	14°13′55″N 121°21′50″E	Upload file
	Unknown House		Laguna	Pila	#79 and #80, Purok 8, Bonifacio Street, Brgy. Santa Clara Sur	14°13′54″N 121°21′51″E	Upload file
	Iglesia Filipina Indepediente Church	Built in 1932 and dedicated to Saint Anthony of Padua	Laguna	Pila	Mabini Street, Brgy. Santa Clara Sur	14°13′49″N 121°21′53″E	Upload file
	Monreal House	Built in 1913	Laguna	Pila	Rizal corner Mabini Street, Brgy. Santa Clara Sur	14°13′50″N 121°21′55″E	Upload file
	Unknown House		Laguna	Pila	#241 Rizal Street, Brgy. Santa Clara Sur	14°13′50″N 121°21′56″E	Upload file
	Aguilar House		Laguna	Pila	#110 Rizal Street, Brgy. Santa Clara Sur	14°13′51″N 121°21′54″E	Upload file
	Clinica Napil	Built in the 1910s	Laguna	Pila	#23 Rizal Street, Brgy. Santa Clara Sur	14°13′52″N 121°21′55″E	Upload file
	Unknown House		Laguna	Pila	De Castro corner Rizal Streets, Brgy. Santa Clara Sur	14°13′54″N 121°21′54″E	Upload file
	Relova House	Now used as Neldan Poutry Supply Store	Laguna	Pila	De Castro corner Rizal Streets, Brgy. Santa Clara Sur	14°13′54″N 121°21′53″E	Upload file
	Unknown House		Laguna	Pila	Rizal Street, Brgy. Santa Clara Sur	14°13′54″N 121°21′53″E	Upload Photo
	Unknown House		Laguna	Pila	Rizal Street, Brgy. Santa Clara Sur	14°13′55″N 121°21′54″E	Upload file
	Petronilo Alava House		Laguna	Pila	Rizal Street, Brgy. Santa Clara Sur	14°13′55″N 121°21′53″E	Upload file
	Unknown House		Laguna	Pila	#43 Rizal Street, Brgy. Santa Clara Sur	14°13′55″N 121°21′53″E	Upload file
	Navarro House		Laguna	Pila	Rizal Street, Brgy. Santa Clara Sur	14°13′56″N 121°21′52″E	Upload file
	Valenzuela House		Laguna	Pila	Ruiz corner Rizal Streets, Brgy. Santa Clara Sur	14°13′58″N 121°21′51″E	Upload file
	Mendoza House		Laguna	Pila	#12 Rizal Street, Brgy. Santa Clara Sur	14°13′58″N 121°21′51″E	Upload file
	Relova House		Laguna	Pila	Rizal Street, Brgy. Santa Clara Sur	14°14′00″N 121°21′50″E	Upload file
	Pila Museum	A one-level, stone structure housing artifacts found from the archaeological excavations done in Pila in 1967.	Laguna	Pila	San Antonio corner Burzagom Street, Brgy. Santa Clara Norte	14°14′03″N 121°21′53″E	Upload file

== See also ==
- Philippine Registry of Cultural Property
