= 50minutes =

Compilation album by Various artists
- Released: 30 October 2006
- Length: 50:00
- Label: EXERCISE1

50minutes is a 2006 charity album, consisting of indie, folk, electronica, and alternative artists from across the world, with all proceeds going to the Medical Foundation. The concept of the album is 50 one-minute long tracks from 50 different artists. It is compiled together in such a way as to produce a continuously flowing piece of music of exactly 50 minutes length.

== Track listing ==
No.	Title	Performing Artist	Length
1.	"The Return"	Trademark
2.	"A Step"	After Christmas
3.	"Gimme a Minute"	Grand Mal
4.	"Hard to Take"	Sennen
5.	"My Ring"	Amycanbe
6.	"The Boy Cried Love"	Jeremy Warmsley
7.	"Sugar"	Piney Gir
8.	"Please Don't Dump Me"	The Bobby McGees
9.	"Constant"	Dons Mobile Barbers
10.	"The Turning Point"	Tom Hatred
11.	"The Monkey"	The Playwrights
12.	"See Me Swinging from the Gallows Tree"	Captain Black
13.	"Most Ungrateful Son"	Simon Mastrantone
14.	"How to Live a Better Life as a Housewife"	Akira
15.	"GMT"	Chris McMath
16.	"Big Water"	Emmy the Great
17.	"Abendrot"	Ladyfuzz
18.	"Lazy Susans Good Health"	El Alto
19.	"Diamond Pig"	Attack + Defend
20.	"Does Not Compute"	The Half Rabbits
21.	"Pissed on the Carpet"	Will Sartain
22.	"Life and How Not to Live It"	Mr G and Rich
23.	"Intermission (edit)"	The Death Set
24.	"If I Had a Time Machine, That Would Be Fresh"	MC Lars
25.	"This Time Around"	Le Tournoi
26.	"Hate Monsters Love Shirts"	Headland
27.	"Shoe People Unite, Shoe People Destroy"	Foibles
28.	"Don't Wanna Go to Walthamstow"	Jareth White
29.	"I Don't Mambo"	Unit
30.	"Ashes"	Roland Shanks
31.	"Man of the House"	Action Plan
32.	"I Left My Heart"	The Hot Puppies
33.	"Oh! Magic Sleeps That Gild These Judgement Lapses"	Youthmovie Soundtrack Strategies
34.	"Forrest Dreams"	Pandatone
35.	"Your Prisons Are Home"	The Coral Sea
36.	"Troubles"	Franc
37.	"Wise Old Lady"	Rachel Lipson
38.	"Tessellations"	I Am Jack
39.	"Lasers in the Jungle"	Hands on Heads
40.	"Kaputchawoonga"	Plans & Apologies
41.	"Bridges"	Laura Groves
42.	"2 by Two"	The London Beach
43.	"Lovers Stone"	Morvern Callar
44.	"Wake Eat Work Sleep"	Transistor State
45.	"Plum Palm"	A Million Billion
46.	"Top of the Pile"	Mr Fogg
47.	"Why Risk Death When There's Only 4 Seconds Left"	Dead! Dead! Dead!
48.	"When I Go"	Wry
49.	"Death on Yr Birthday"	Pacific Ocean Fire
50.	"You Made My High School"	Daniel Johnston

=== Bonus Audio ===
There is a bonus interactive CD ROM on the disc. This has a selection of streamable bonus songs. These include Exercise1's favorite songs that did not make the final compilation due to bands recording more than one song or submissions that were entered past the deadline. The track listing for these songs was:

No.	Title	Performing Artist	Length
1.	"Yoki"	Plans & Apologies
2.	"Fathom"	Cuentistas
3.	"Speech or Breathing"	Mise en Abyme
4.	"Hiatus"	Muchos Perros
5.	"The Fight"	Richard Adderly
6.	"A Very Short Romance"	Small Crew
7.	"The Grocery Store"	Phil and the Osophers
