= Twin Falls =

Twin Falls can refer to:

== Cities and counties ==
- Twin Falls, Idaho
- Twin Falls County, Idaho

== Waterfalls ==
In Australia

- Twin Falls (Northern Territory), a waterfall in the Kakadu National Park in the Northern Territory

In Canada

- Twin Falls (British Columbia), a waterfall in Yoho National Park, British Columbia
- Twin Falls (Labrador), a waterfall and hydroelectric generating station in Labrador

In the Philippines

- Twin Falls (Camarines Sur), a waterfall named Itbog Falls located in Buhi, Camarines Sur

In the United States

- Twin Falls (Idaho), a waterfall in Idaho, the namesake of the city of Twin Falls
- Twin Falls (Montana), a waterfall in the Glacier National Park
- Twin Falls (Oregon), a waterfall in the Silver Falls State Park.
- Twin Falls (South Carolina), a waterfall near Pickens
- Twin Falls (Washington), a waterfall near North Bend in Washington state
- Twin Falls (Hawaii), a waterfall in Maui, Hawaii

== In music ==
- Twin Falls (band), an indie electronic folk band from Somerset, England
- "Twin Falls", a song from the 1994 album There's Nothing Wrong with Love by Built to Spill
- "Twin Falls", a live cover released by Ben Folds Five on their 1998 album Naked Baby Photos

== Other ==
- USNS Twin Falls (T-AGM-11), a missile range instrumentation ship
- Twin Falls Resort State Park, Saulsville, West Virginia
