= Twin Falls (band) =

English indie electronic band

- Origin: Somerset, England
- Genres: Indie Rock, Lo fi, electronic
- Years active: 2008–present
- Labels: The Loud Cloud Recording Co, Circus City Music Group
- Members: Luke Stidson; Emma Kingston; James Thornton
- Website: www.twinfalls.co.uk

Twin Falls is an indie electronic band from Somerset, England. Revolving largely around Luke Stidson, who previously ran the record label Exercise1 Records. The band has released two EPs and two full-length albums. Their debut album Slow Numb was self-released on 12 September 2011. The Lead single "Janie I will Only Let You Down" was play listed on BBC Radio 1, BBC 6Music, and BBC Radio Bristol throughout 2012. The single release included a remix by New York electronic artist A Million Billion. The follow-up 'May All Your Dreams Be Full of Light' arrived in 2013. The band also appeared live at the 2013 Glastonbury Festival on the BBC Introducing Stage.

In March 2013 Luke was involved in a dispute with US musician Chris Carrabba over the use of the Twin Falls name. After a lengthy article that Stidson posted online was shared by a large number of people on Twitter, including radio presenter Tom Robinson, Carrabba's act stopped any legal action and changed their name.

== Discography ==
Studio albums

- Slow Numb (2011)
- May All Your Dreams Be Full of Light (2013)

Extended plays

- We Will Begin To Flicker (2009)
- The Seasoned Times (2010)
