= 2019 Buhi local elections =

Local elections in the Philippines

2019 Buhi mayoral election
- May 13, 2019
Nominee	Margarita Aguinillo	Rey Lacoste
Party	NPC	PDP–Laban
Running mate	Diones Belza	Jose Alfred Balagot
Popular vote	18,909	16,892
Percentage	52.82%	47.18%
Mayor before election
Margarita Aguinillo
NPC
Elected mayor
TBD

Local elections were held in Buhi, Camarines Sur on May 13, 2019, within the Philippine general election, for posts of the mayor, vice mayor and eight councilors.

== Overview ==
The incumbent mayor, Margarita Aguinillo of Nationalist People's Coalition ran once again for mayoral post against vice mayor Rey Lacoste from PDP–Laban party.

== Results ==
The candidates for mayor and vice mayor with the highest number of votes win. They are voted for separately. Therefore, they may be of different parties when elected.

=== Mayoral and vice mayoral elections ===
Buhi, Camarines Sur mayoralty election
Party	Candidate	Votes	%
NPC	Margarita Aguinillo	18,909	50.24
PDP–Laban	Rey Lacoste	16,892	44.89
Margin of victory		2,017	5.36
Invalid or blank votes		1,833	4.87
Total votes		37,634	100.00

Buhi, Camarines Sur vice mayoralty election
Party	Candidate	Votes	%
PDP–Laban	Jose Alfred Balagot	19,702	52.35
NPC	Diones Belza	14,382	38.22
Margin of victory		5,320	14.14
Invalid or blank votes		3,550	9.43
Total votes		37,634	100.00

=== Municipal Council elections ===
Voters elected eight councilors to comprise the Municipal Council or the Sangguniang Bayan. Candidates were voted separately so winning candidates may come from different political parties. The eight candidates with the highest number of votes won the seats.

2019 Buhi municipal council
Party	Candidate	Votes	%
NPC	Marlon Tabalde	17,723	47.09
NPC	Maria Bella Nonato	17,332	46.05
NPC	Myrna Imperial	14,987	39.82
Nacionalista	Raul Libardo	14,829	39.40
Nacionalista	Catherine Martinez	14,151	37.60
Nacionalista	Christian Echipare	13,628	36.21
NPC	Loreto Camasis	12,864	34.18
Nacionalista	Agustin Villadares, III	12,574	33.41
NPC	Victor Ramon Carullo	12,188	32.39
Bicol Saro	Don Sibangan	11,879	31.56
Nacionalista	Rickie San Jose	11,653	30.96
NPC	Edgar Collao	10,916	29.01
Nacionalista	Eddie Mesalucha	10,877	28.90
NPC	Ruy Equizabal	10,675	28.37
NPC	Eduardo Lavadia	9,969	26.49
Nacionalista	Nelson Velasco	8,246	21.91
Total votes		37,634	100.00
