= Pacific Ocean Fire =

English folk rock band

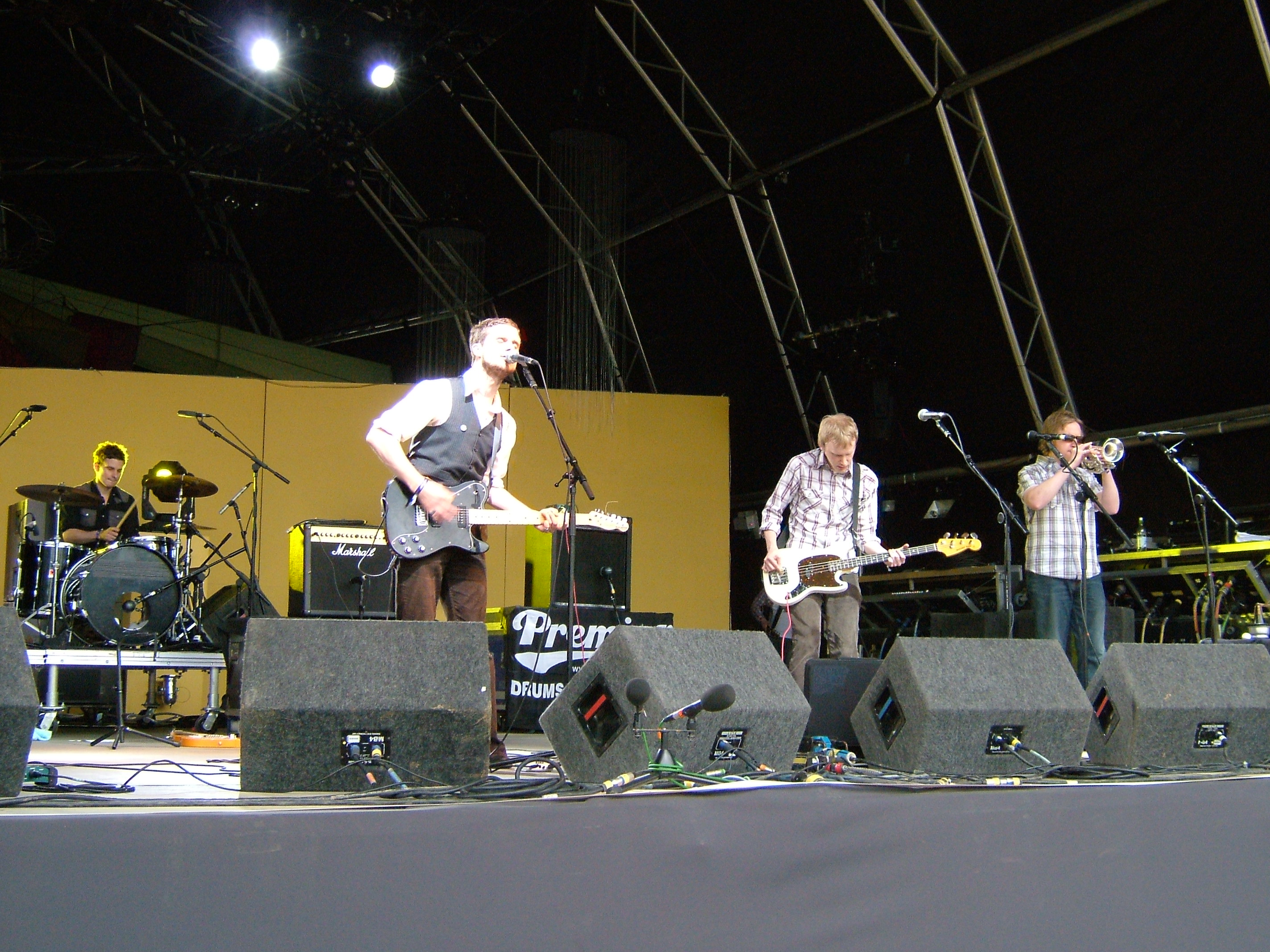
- Performing on the main stage of Summer Sundae 2007

Background information
- Origin: Leicester, England
- Genres: Americana
- Years active: 2001–2009
- Labels: Smokeylung, Sorted, Azra
- Members: Jon Bennett; Andy Bennett; Ross Voce; David Fellows
- Website: http://www.pacificoceanfire.com/

Pacific Ocean Fire were a folk rock group from Leicester, England, who released five albums. Their music was generally considered alternative or Americana.

== History ==
The band formed in 2001 and comprised Jon Bennett (vocals, guitar), his brother Andy Bennett (drums), Ross Voce (guitar), and David Fellows (bass, trumpet). They cited among their influences Sebadoh, Dennis Wilson, Plush, Tindersticks, and Silver Jews. The band recorded two EP's which they gave away at concerts, leading to American label Smokeylung picking them up and releasing their self-titled second album in 2005, a North American tour following.

Their third album, From the Station to the Church We are Under the Same Stars, was released on Sorted Records, the title referring to the way it was recorded:

"We recorded half of the album in a room above Leicester train station. The other half was recorded and mixed at Dave’s home, he lived on a road with “church” in the street name . We spent so much time between those places late at night that became it".

After previously playing the Musician Stage of the Summer Sundae festival, they performed on the main stage in 2007, also performing regularly at Truck Festival and the dumduckerdum Music Festival, then going on to tour the UK with Josh T Pearson. The band's fourth album, Strangers and Deranged Patients was released in November 2007 on the American Azra label. It was followed by a US tour in 2008.

The band split in September 2009 after performing their farewell gig at Camden Dingwalls supporting Drugstore, following an invitation to play from Isabel Monteiro. Their final album, Hibernation songs, written amidst and largely about very personal tragedies for songwriter Jon Bennett, namely the dissolution of his marriage and the death of his father was released on Azra Records in July 2010.

== Discography ==
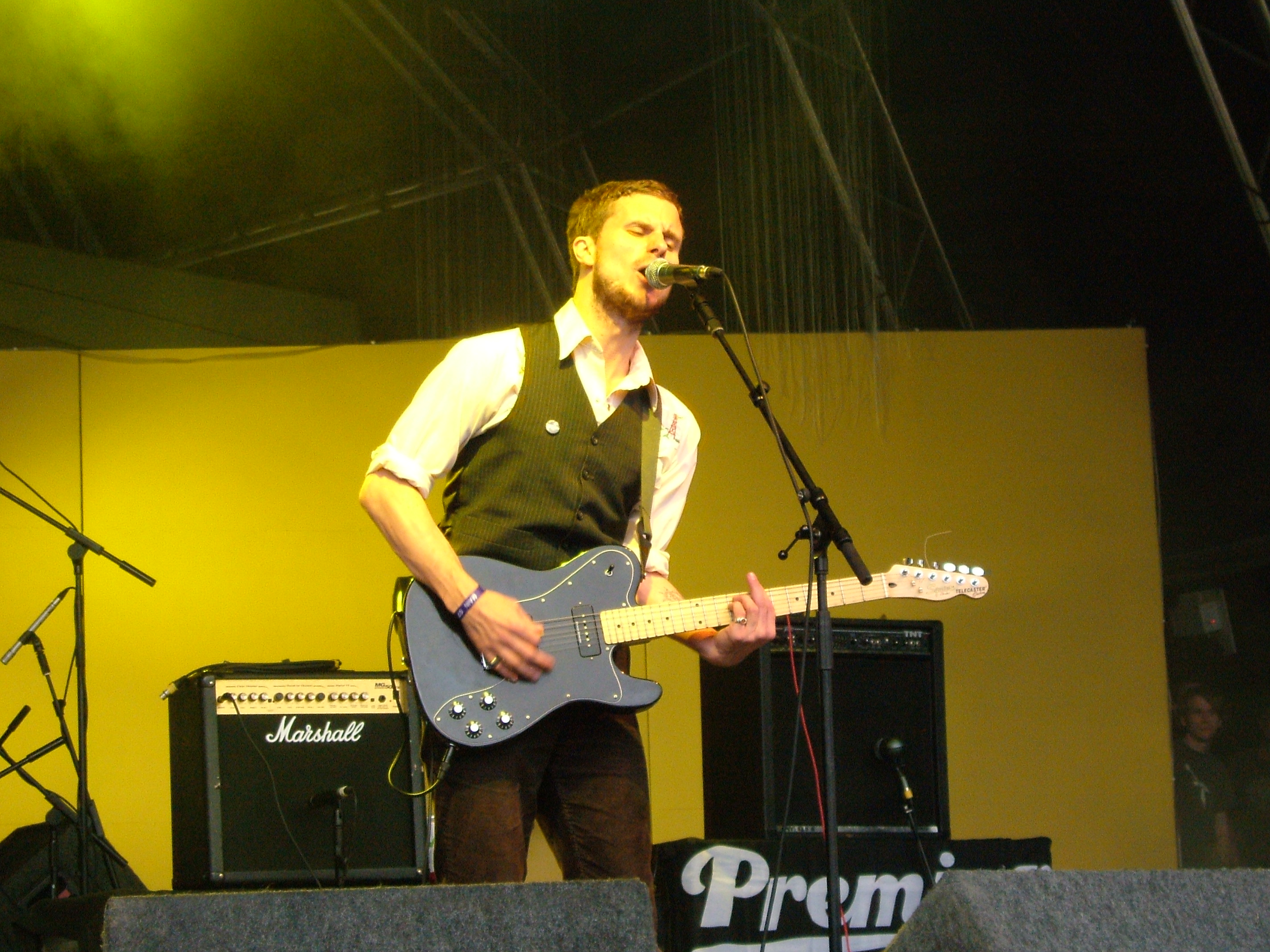
Pacific Ocean Fire singer Jon Bennett

=== Singles ===
- Roadsigns EP (2003)
- Whiskey Fiction EP (2005)
- "Split EP" 10" EP (2005) Sorted (split with Don's Mobile Barbers)

=== Albums ===
- Tales of Love and Loss and Living (2003) Self released
- Pacific Ocean Fire (2005) Smokeylung records
- From The Station to the Church We Are Under The Same Stars (2006) Sorted records
- Strangers and Deranged Patients (2007) Azra records
- Hibernation songs (2010) Azra records

=== Compilation appearances ===
- Comes with a Smile Vol. 15 – Gloved Hands in a Squeeze (2005) Comes With a Smile, includes "My Drinking Days are Done"
- 50minutes (2006) Exercise 1, includes "Death on Yr Birthday"
