= Buhi Church =

Roman Catholic church in Camarines Sur, Philippines

- Saint Francis of Assisi Parish Church
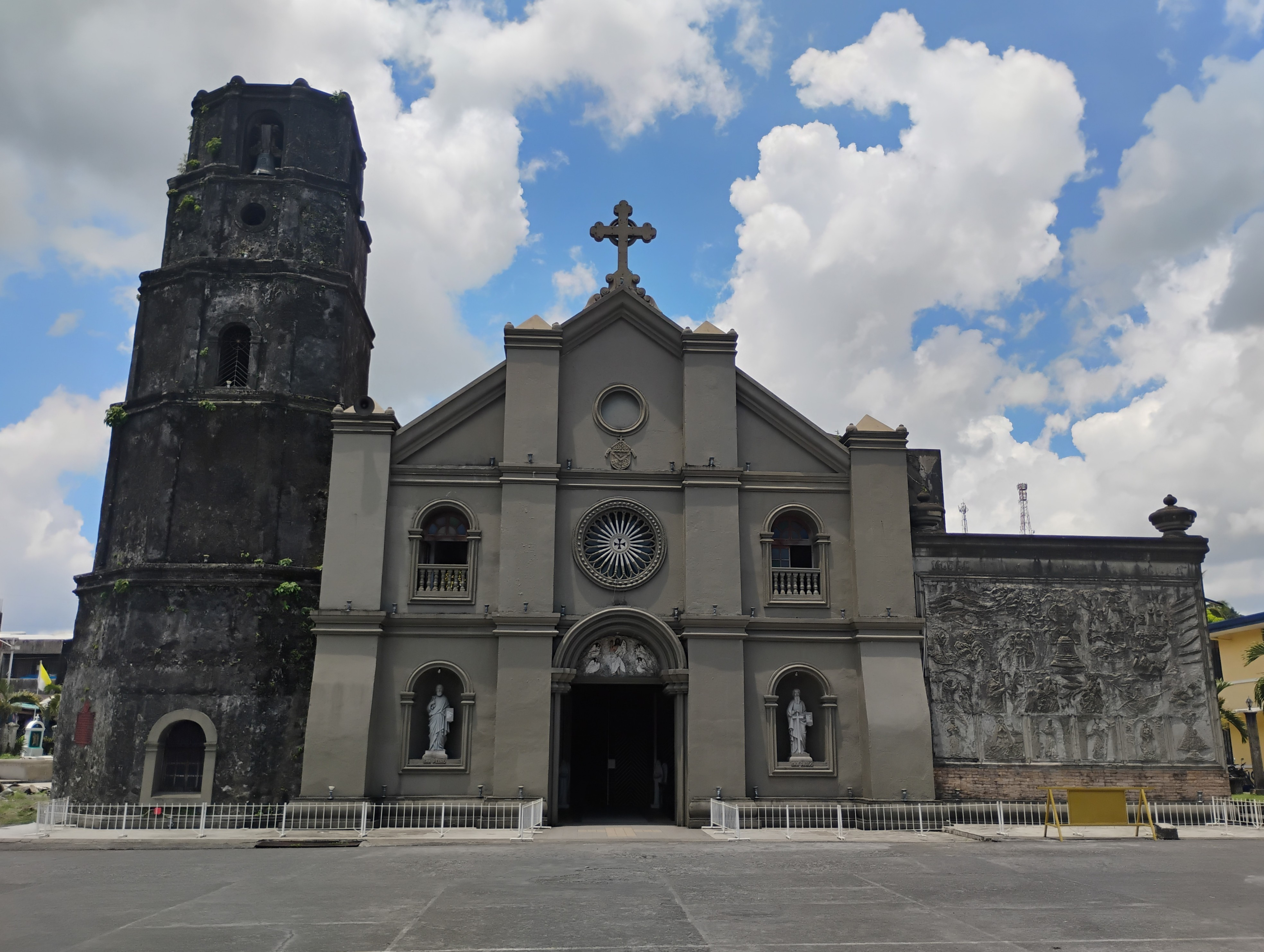
- Church facade in 2025

- Location in Luzon Location in the Philippines
- 13°25′58″N 123°31′1″E
- Location: Buhi, Camarines Sur
- Country: Philippines
- Denomination: Roman Catholic

History
- Status: Parish church
- Dedication: Francis of Assisi

Architecture
- Functional status: Active
- Heritage designation: National Historical Landmark
- Designated: 1938
- Architectural type: Church building
- Completed: 1884; 142 years ago

Administration
- Archdiocese: Caceres

Saint Francis of Assisi Parish Church, commonly known as Buhi Church, is a Roman Catholic church located in Buhi, Camarines Sur, Philippines. It is under the jurisdiction of the Archdiocese of Caceres.

The church was destroyed by fire in 1730, and was damaged at various times by earthquakes. The present church was built between 1870 and 1884. The roof was destroyed by fire and fully repaired in 1890.

The National Historical Commission of the Philippines declared it a national historical landmark in 1938.

== Gallery ==
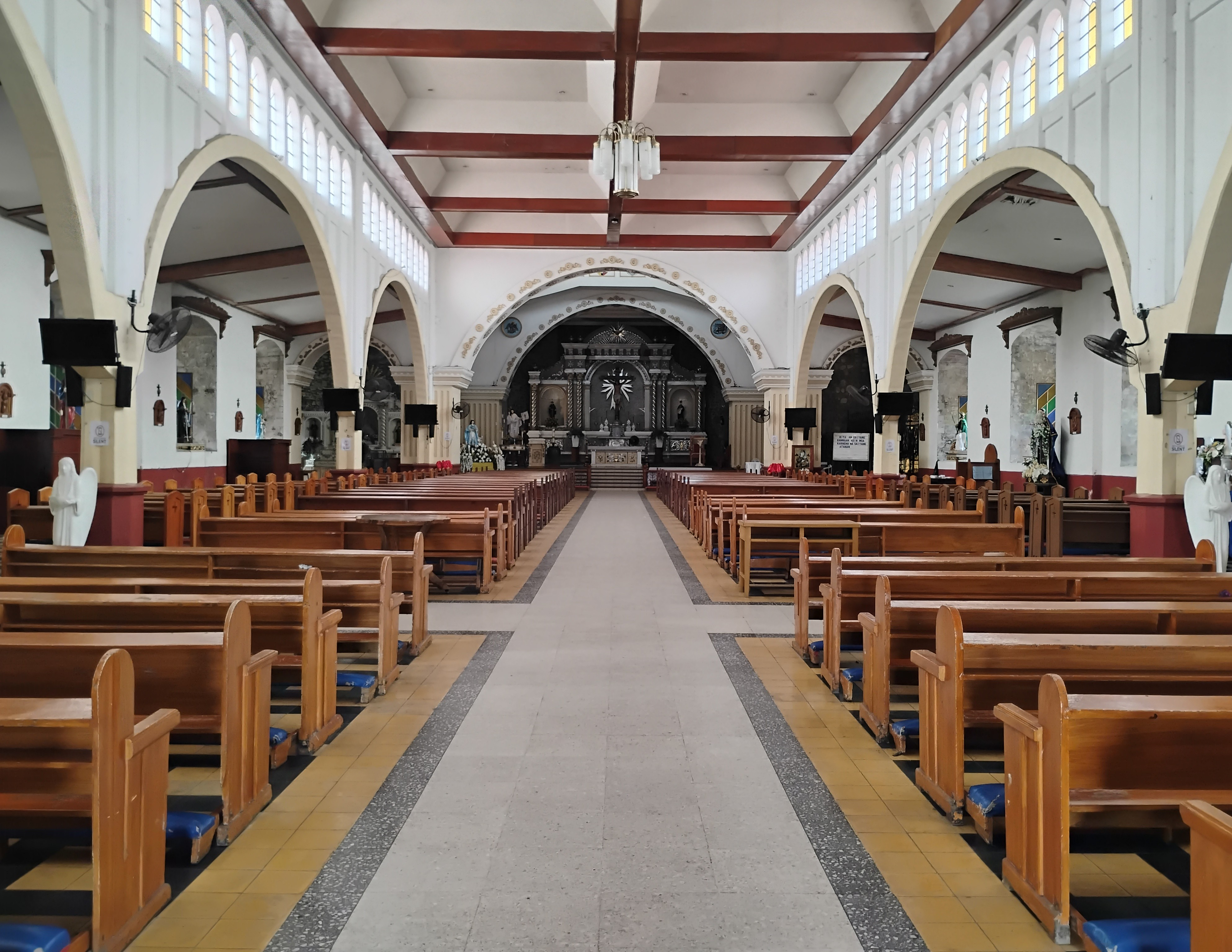
Church interior in 2025

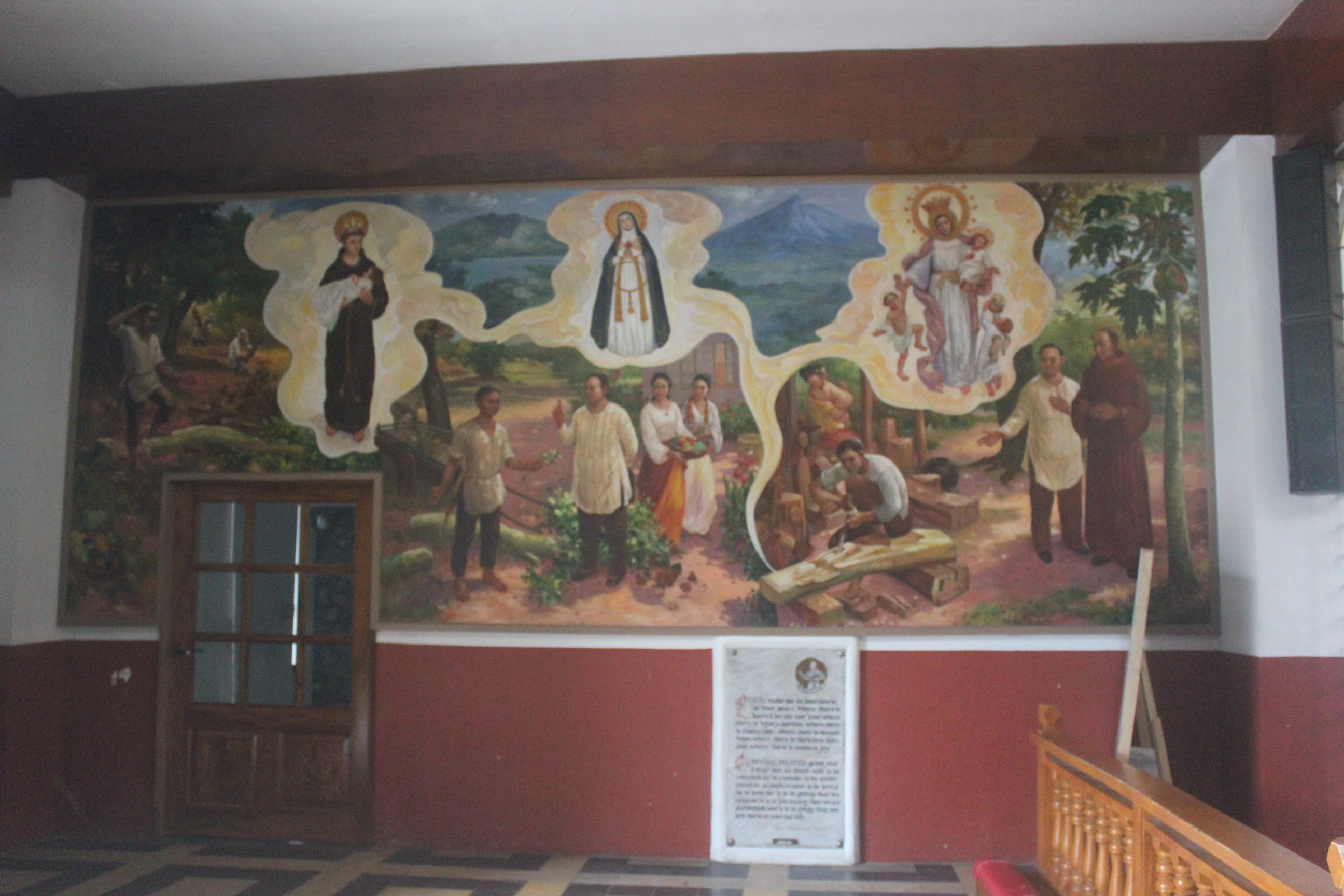
Painting inside the church depicting the story of the three miraculous images from Buhi

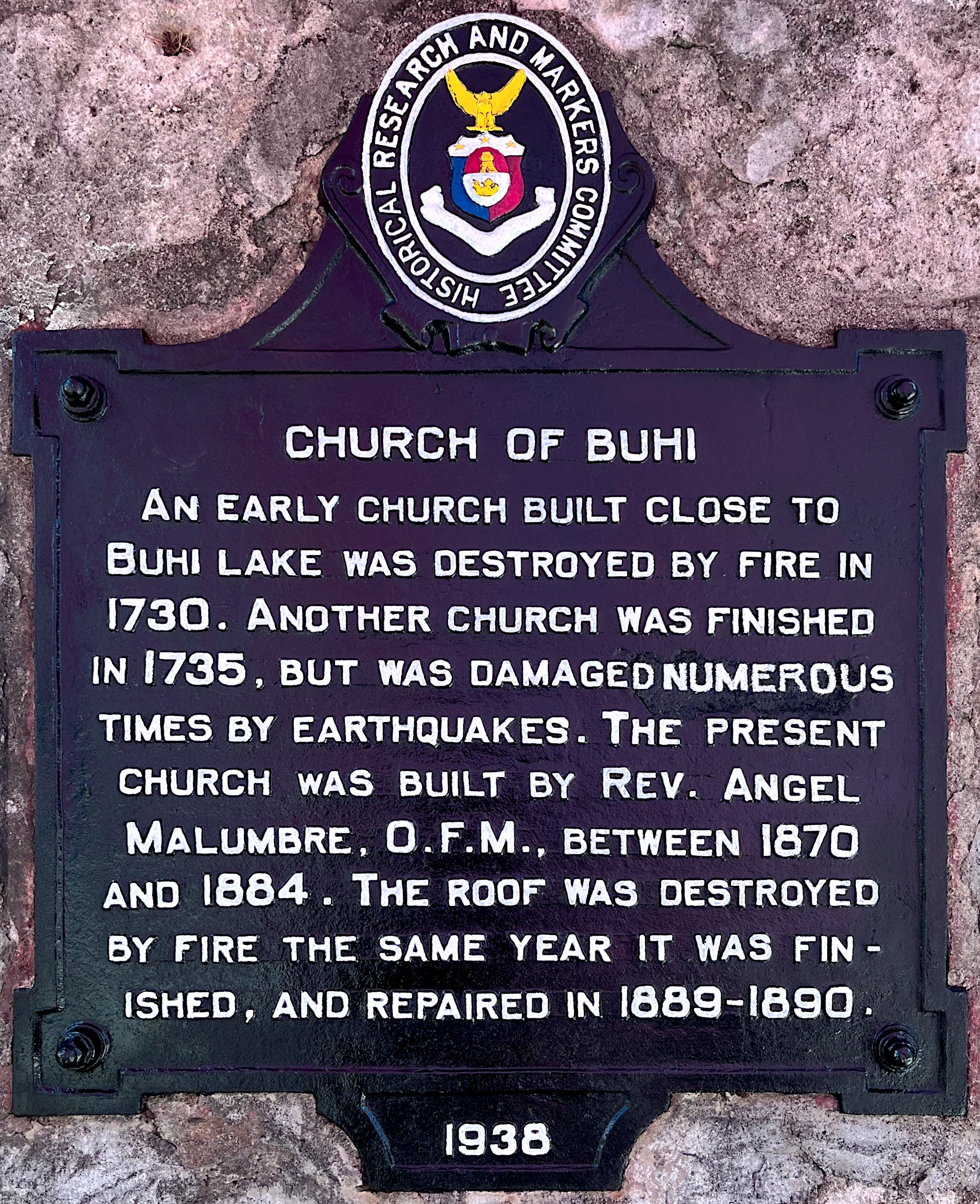
Church HRMC historical marker installed in 1938
