= Volcano and Heart =

Studio album by The Coral Sea
- Released: June 27, 2006
- Genre: Alternative rock, indie rock
- Length: 44:31
- Label: Hidden Agenda Records
- Producer: Tom Flowers

The Coral Sea chronology
Volcano and Heart (2006)	Firelight (2008)

Professional ratings
Review scores
Source	Rating
Allmusic	3/5 stars
PopMatters	5/10 stars

Volcano and Heart is the debut album of California-based band The Coral Sea. It was self-released May 14, 2005, and then later released on June 26, 2006, on Hidden Agenda Records. Two songs from the album, "Look at Her Face" and "Yesterday/Tomorrow" were featured on television in 2006, in Grey's Anatomy and Standoff (TV series) respectively.

Writing for AllMusic, James Christopher Monger states that "Villalobos' warbled but sweet tenor gives off notes of Television's Tom Verlaine and the arrangements and performances from both the band and string players are top-notch, especially on "In Between the Days" and "Ancient Modern People."

== Track listing ==
All songs composed by Rey Villalobos.

1. Look at Her Face – 4:04
2. Under the Westway – 3:55
3. In Between the Days – 3:35
4. In This Moment's Time – 4:52
5. Yesterday/Tomorrow – 4:48
6. Your Time Has Come – 5:36
7. Lake and Ocean – 4:15
8. Fell – 5:07
9. Ancient Modern People – 3:46
10. Descend – 4:49

== Personnel ==
- Nate Birkey – Trumpet
- James Garza – Bass
- Matthew Talmage – Drums
- Rey Villalobos – Guitar, keyboard, vocals
- Duncan Wright – Guitar
