= The Coral Sea (band) =

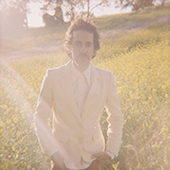

Background information
- Origin: California, United States
- Genres: Indie, art rock, folk
- Years active: 2004 – present
- Labels: Trees They Move, Hidden Agenda Records, Red Clover Records

The Coral Sea is a California-based indie music project and moniker of singer, songwriter and composer Rey Villalobos. The music is atmospheric and ambient. Songs have been used on American TV shows Grey's Anatomy, Sleeper Cell and Californication. The song "Yesterday / Tomorrow" was used at the end of the series pilot for Standoff.

Formed in 2004 by lead singer and songwriter Rey Villalobos. Self-produced first album Volcano and Heart was released in 2006. In 2006, their song "Look at Her Face", from their first album, was featured on the Grey's Anatomy season finale. In 2009, their song “Ah, Ah, Ah”, from their second album "Firelight", was featured on Grey's Anatomy.

== Discography ==
=== Singles and EPs ===
- "Look At Her Face" - 24 April 2006, Limited Edition Single on EXERCISE1 Records (UK only)
- "Play Me" EP - 27 August 2010, Red Clover Records
- "Yesterday Tomorrow" (Demo) - 21 April 2020, Single, Trees They Move

=== Albums ===
- Volcano and Heart - 27 June 2006, Hidden Agenda Records (Parasol)
- Firelight - 8 August 2008, Red Clover Records
- Fold in the Wind (2011)
- Daughter of the Sea (2015)
- House of Wolves (2016)
- Home Recordings Volume I (2022)
- Golden Planet Sky (2023)
