= Exercise1 Recordings =

- Founded: 2005
- Founder: Luke Stidson; John Kelly; Tom Madders
- Distributor(s): Shellshock (UK)
- Genre: Indie
- Country of origin: UK
- Location: London
- Official website: http://www.exercise1.net/

Exercise1 Recordings (often shortened to EX1) was a London-based independent record label that released debut singles from Jeremy Warmsley, A Million Billion, Plans & Apologies, The Coral Sea, and Twin Thousands. It also released the 50minutes compilation album in late 2006, featuring 50 one-minute tracks from 50 artists, including Daniel Johnston, Youthmovies, and MC Lars amongst others, with proceeds going to the Medical Foundation.

In August 2008 the following notice appeared on the label's official site:

It's with regret that the 3 partners of Exercise1 Recordings need to inform you that we have decided it is time to call it a day on the project, put up our feet, drink some tea and pat each other on the back for all that we did over the last 4 years.

The idea at the start (and end for that matter) was always to create a catalogue of work recorded, crafted, designed, packaged and promoted with an immense amount of love and a minute amount of financial backing. Fortunately this catalogue will always be there, along will the hole in our bank accounts and our low credit scores, but more importantly so will the radio plays, video plays, reviews, interviews and just general recognition for our artists that were obtained with good music, rather than some lavish PR budget.

Naturally it's not the last you'll hear from our artists, and we'd like to point out that none are under any form of contract or written agreement with us and will be free to make music for you in whatever method they choose to in the future. Neither is it the last you'll hear from us 3, individually or as a collective. We plan to put something new together in the not too distant future.

== Discography ==
- EX1.9 Decades – Thinking Round Corners – Single
- EX1.13 The DIY Cravings – Annie & Tommy – Single
- EX1.16 Jeremy Warmsley – I Believe in The Way You Move – Single
- EX1.22 The London Beach – Immagrentie – Single
- EX1.24 A Million Billion with Dons Mobile Barbers – Exmas Message 2005: Iceland – Digital Download
- EX1.25 A Million Billion – Volcano Season – EP
- EX1.26 Plans & Apologies – Spiderz in The Bar (Part II) – EP
- EX1.27 The Coral Sea – Look at Her Face – Single
- EX1.30 Various Artists – 50minutes – Album
- EX1.31 Plans & Apologies – Exmas Message 2006 – Digital Download
- EX1.32 Twin Thousands – Like You A Lot – Single
- EX1.33 Various Artists – Ten – Album
- EX1.34 Plans & Apologies – Meetoo – Single
- EX1.35 Adam Patrick – Exmas Message 2007: This Christmas Eve – Digital Download

== See also ==
- List of record labels
- List of independent UK record labels
