= Buhi, Camarines Sur =

Municipality in Camarines Sur, Philippines

Buhi
- Municipality
- Municipality of Buhi
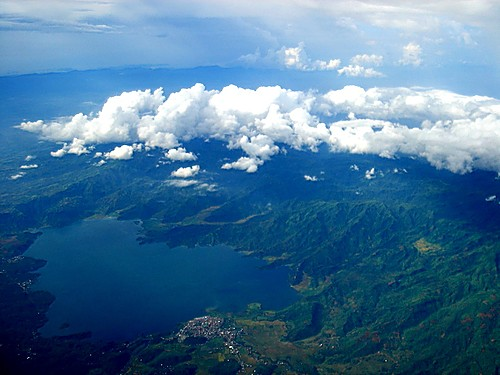
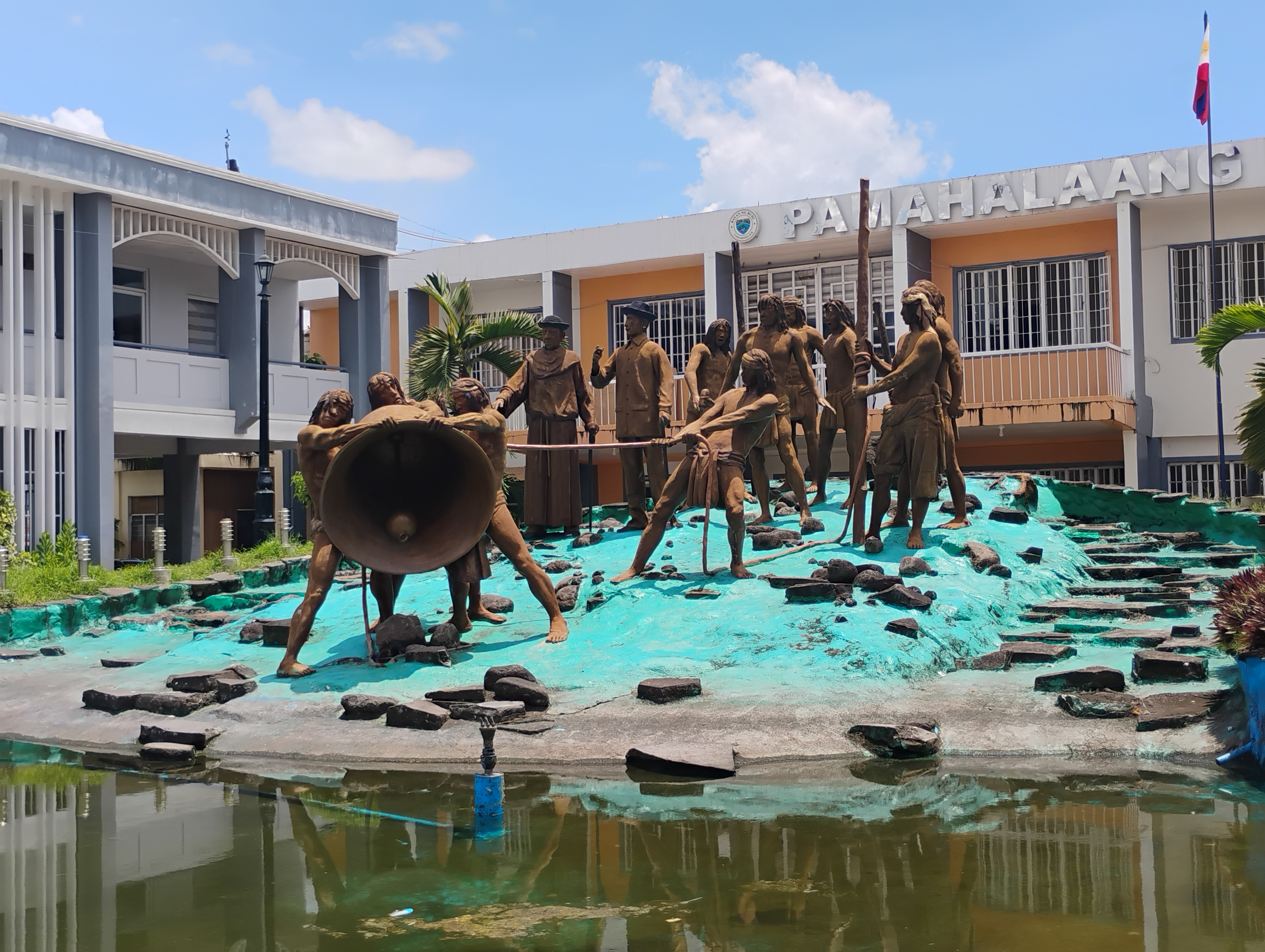
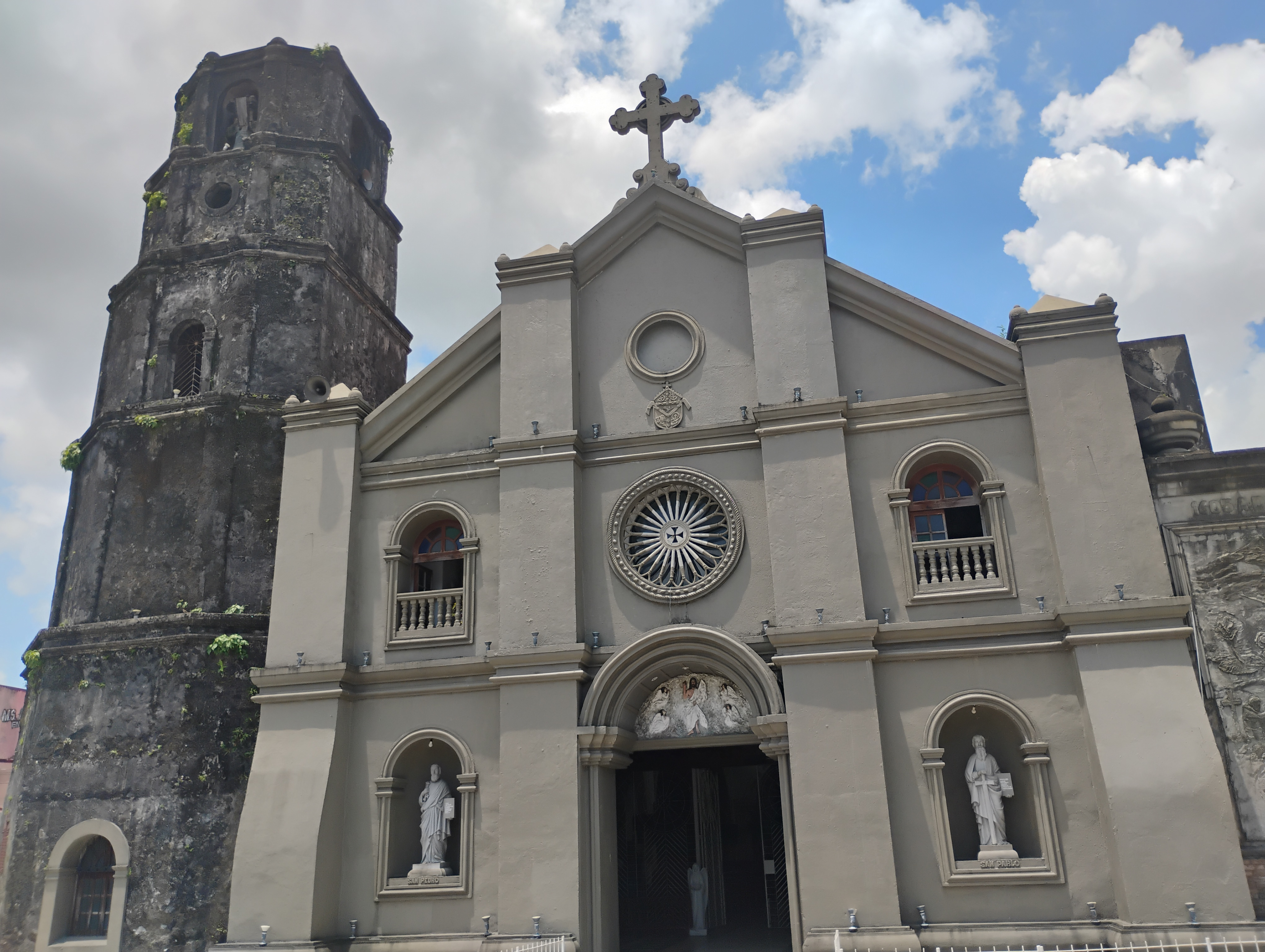
- View of Buhi from Mount Asog Buhi Municipal Hall Saint Francis of Assisi Parish Church

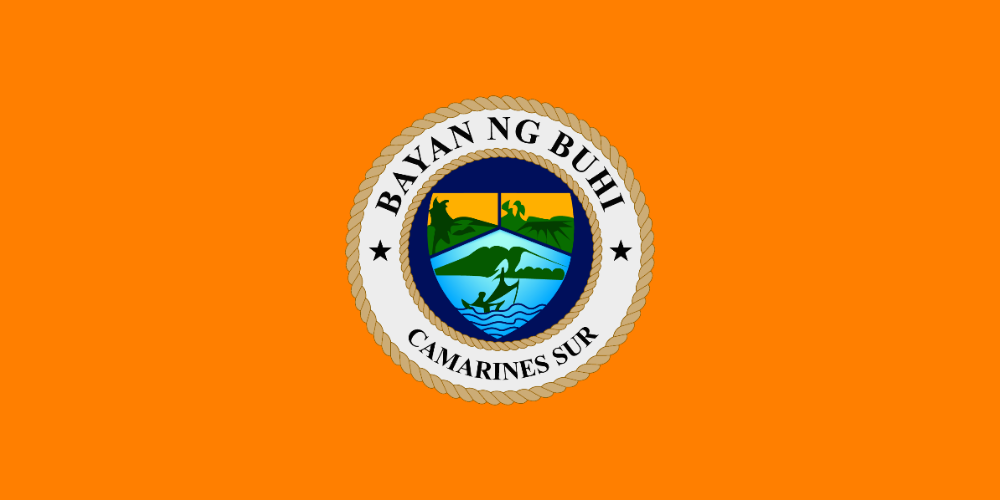
- Flag Seal

- Map of Camarines Sur with Buhi highlighted
- Interactive map of Buhi
- Location within the Philippines
- Coordinates: 13°26′05″N 123°31′00″E
- Country: Philippines
- Region: Bicol Region
- Province: Camarines Sur
- District: 5th district
- Founded: April 14, 1578
- Barangays: 38 (see Barangays)

Government
  - Type: Sangguniang Bayan
  - Mayor: Rey P. Lacoste
  - Vice Mayor: Christian I. Echipare
  - Representative: Miguel Luis R. Villafuerte
  - Municipal Council: Members: Marlon L. Tabalde; Dr. Renz Julius Z. Nonato; Leticia Digay Moralde; Raul C. Libardo Jr.; Michael Angelo V. Lacoste; Eddie A. Mesalucha; Gloria M. Arce; Victor Ramon H. Carullo; John Paul C. Felices, SK Federation President; Redentor Cañada, IPMR
  - Electorate: 53,101 voters (2025)

Area
  - Total: 246.65 km^{2} (95.23 sq mi)
- Elevation: 129 m (423 ft)
- Highest elevation: 1,409 m (4,623 ft)
- Lowest elevation: 0 m (0 ft)

Population (2024 census)
  - Total: 78,104
  - Density: 316.66/km^{2} (820.14/sq mi)
  - Households: 18,796

Economy
  - Income class: 1st municipal income class
  - Poverty incidence: 27.17% (2023)
  - Revenue: ₱245,889,870.47 (2020)
  - Assets: ₱643,761,840.05 (2020)
  - Expenditure: ₱ 239.5 million (2024)
  - Liabilities: ₱ 157.8 million (2024)

Service provider
  - Electricity: Camarines Sur 3 Electric Cooperative (CASURECO 3)
- Time zone: UTC+8 (PST)
- ZIP code: 4433
- PSGC: 0501705000
- IDD : area code: +63 (0)54
- Native languages: Central Bikol; Tagalog
- Website: www.buhi.gov.ph

Buhi, officially the Municipality of Buhi (Buhinon: Banwaan nya Buhi; Rinconada Bikol: Banwāan ka Buhi; Tagalog: Bayan ng Buhi), is a municipality in the province of Camarines Sur, Philippines. According to the 2024 census, it has a population of 78,104 people.

The town is known for its Lake Buhi where sinarapan (Mystychtis luzonensis) is located, the world’s smallest edible fish. This tiny fish lives in the lake and is a well-known local species. The town is recognized for being the home of this unique freshwater fish.

== Etymology ==
The name Buhi is linked to the local phrase naka-buhi, meaning to escape danger. Stories say early settlers used the term for people who fled events like volcanic eruptions. Another version says Spaniards asked locals for the name of the place, and the settlers answered naka-buhi, thinking they were asked how they came to live there. This later became the town’s name.

== History ==
The town known today as Buhi began as a small settlement by refugees fleeing the outrage of Mayon Volcano hundreds of years ago. These people founded a permanent settlement in an area close to the lake and flourished as time passed.

The general exodus of people fleeing and being able to escape grave calamities such as Mayon's eruption was known in local vernacular as "naka-buhi". Local lore takes this as the most probable explanation as to how the town acquired its present name – Buhi. One version of local legend attributes the town being accorded the name to the time when the first Spaniards came and asked local settlers the name of the area. The local settlers misunderstood the question as how they came to be there and so gave the response "Naka-Buhi".

There were two patron saints with whom the town directed their devotion. The first was St. Francis of Assisi placed in the church made of wooden materials. Unfortunately, in 1730 the church was razed down by fire. It was, however, replaced by a stone structure built under the supervision of Rev. Fray Jose de Cerda. Another saint was installed, St. Anthony of Padua. The 1818 census showed the area had 2,903 native families and 15 Spanish-Filipino families.

The present Buhi Church was completed in 1884. The roof was destroyed by fire and fully repaired in 1890.

On December 28, 1995, 13 people of Sitio Bogtong, Barangay Gabas were killed, three of whom were beheaded, by four gunmen inside a house, with survivors numbering at least seven. The massacre arose due to disputes over a 24-hectare farm land previously owned by the assassinated Cristito Nieva Jr. and his wife Ester; two of the victims, Estelito Campo and Alex Gaite, were petitioners in an agrarian case that had the Nieva couple as respondents. A witness pointed to brothers Toto and Rogelio "Crisboy" Clyde and two of their relatives as being the perpetrators of the crime.

== Geography ==
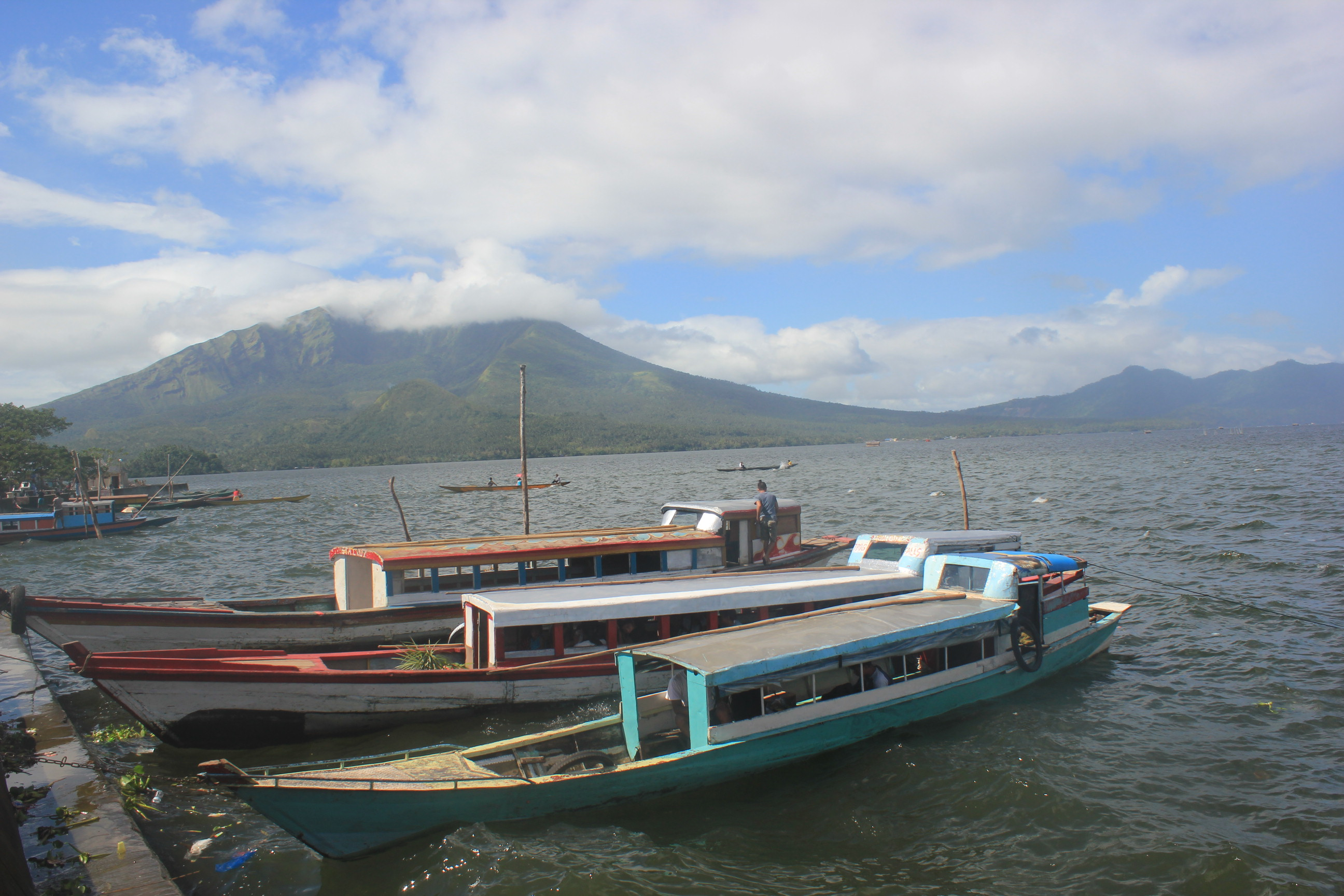
Lake Buhi

Buhi is located in the south-eastern part of the province of Camarines Sur. It is bound on the east by Mount Malinao, on the west by Mount Asog and Iriga City, on the north by Sagñay-Buhi mountain ranges and on the south by the low-lying ranges of Polangui, Albay, with the following coordinates: 13 degrees 25’ 32.4" north latitude and 123 degrees 30’ 49.1" east longitude. It is 75 kilometres (47 mi) north-east of Legazpi City and 53 kilometres (33 mi) and south of Naga City.

The municipality has been divided into five sectors, namely:

- The Poblacion
- The Lake/Mt. Asog sector
- the Road/cross road sector
- The Mountain sector
- The Malangkaw Sector

=== Barangays ===
Buhi is politically subdivided into 38 barangays. Each barangay consists of puroks and some have sitios.

- Amlongan (Del Rosario)
- Antipolo
- Burocbusoc
- Cabatuan
- Cagmaslog
- Dela Fe (Labnig)
- Delos Angeles (Macagang/Nagbabangca)
- Divino Rostro (Marolasgas)
- Gabas
- Ibayugan
- Igbac
- Ipil
- Iraya
- Labawon (Sta. Teresita)
- Lourdes-Hinulid-Tubog
- Macaangay
- Monte Calvario (Pagonsan)
- Namurabod
- Sagrada-Pito
- Salvacion (Monte Cassino-San Benito)
- San Antonio (Maybatang)
- San Buenaventura
- San Francisco Parada
- San Isidro (Manila)
- San Jose Baybayon
- San Jose Salay
- San Pascual
- San Pedro
- San Rafael (Quegading)
- San Ramon (Kimat)
- San Roque
- San Vicente (Buraburan)
- Santa Clara
- Santa Cruz (Monte Cristo)
- Santa Elena
- Santa Isabel (Magpalaypay)
- Santa Justina
- Tambo

=== Topography ===
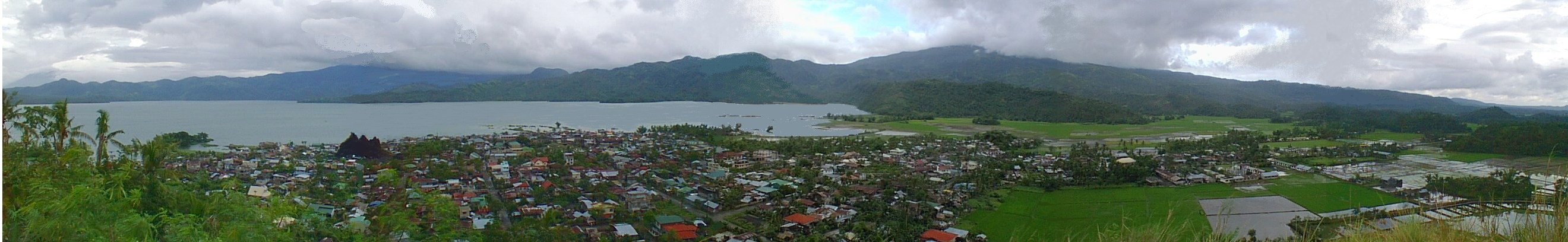

Buhi has generally mountainous and hilly surface, with 50% of its area having a slope of around 25%. The Poblacion located on the south shore of Lake Buhi, has gently rolling topography.

Mt. Malinao and Mt. Asog dominate the town's surface terrain whose highest elevations are 1,548 metres (5,079 ft) and 1,196 metres (3,924 ft) above main sea level respectively.

Itbog Falls located in Barangay Santa Cruz, on the south-eastern side of Lake Buhi, is a 60 feet (18 m) twin waterfalls. It could be reached by means of a motorized boat ride from the town proper, then a 30-minute trek.

=== Climate ===
Climate data for Buhi, Camarines Sur
Month	Jan	Feb	Mar	Apr	May	Jun	Jul	Aug	Sep	Oct	Nov	Dec	Year
Mean daily maximum °C (°F)	31 (88)	30 (86)	33 (91)	35 (95)	36 (97)	35 (95)	34 (93)	32 (90)	34 (93)	32 (90)	31 (88)	30 (86)	33 (91)
Mean daily minimum °C (°F)	26 (79)	26 (79)	28 (82)	30 (86)	31 (88)	30 (86)	29 (84)	28 (82)	29 (84)	28 (82)	27 (81)	27 (81)	28 (83)
Average precipitation mm (inches)	64.54 (2.54)	102.68 (4.04)	57.93 (2.28)	85.33 (3.36)	202.28 (7.96)	290.93 (11.45)	389.95 (15.35)	298.3 (11.74)	311.59 (12.27)	437.08 (17.21)	132.1 (5.20)	373.8 (14.72)	2,746.51 (108.12)
Average rainy days	22	26	18	19	24	30	31	29	29	29	27	30	314
Source: World Weather Online

Buhi has a warm, humid climate. During the warmest months from March to June, temperatures reach 29.2 °C (84.6 °F). The weather cools off during the rainy season which last from August to February with an average temperature of 24.7 °C (76.5 °F).

=== Land use ===
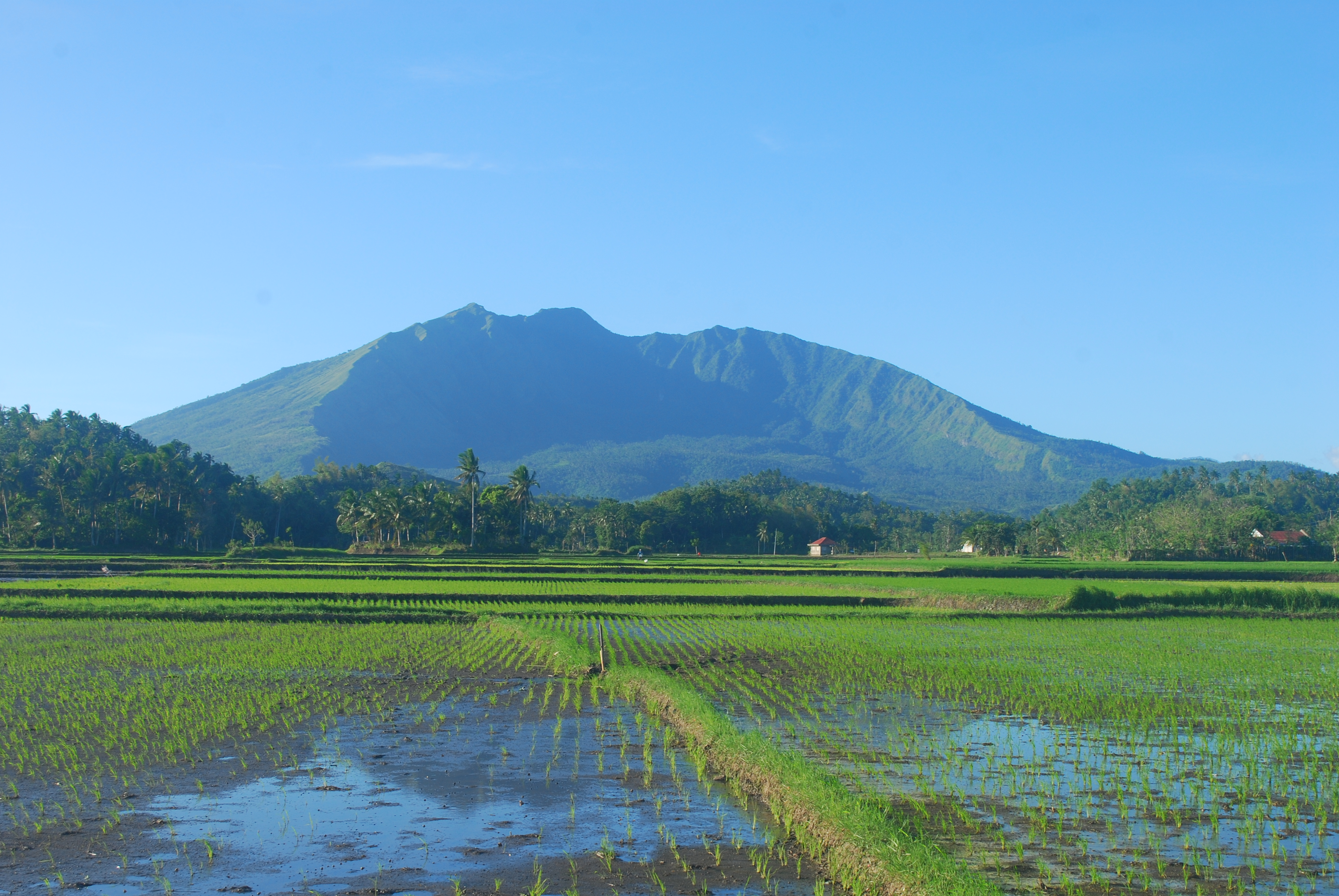
A rice field with the view of Mount Asog

A total area of 24,665 hectares (60,950 acres) is occupied by the municipality, about 13,000 hectares of which are part of the watershed in Rinconada. 18,378 hectares (45,410 acres) of its land area are within the watershed declared as protected area by virtue of Presidential Proclamation No. 573 and Executive Order no. 224. All other areas are cultivated for agriculture, quarry and human settlement. Higher slopes east and north of Lake Buhi are predominantly forests and secondary brushland. Total area utilized as built-up areas is 448 hectares (1,110 acres).

Farmlands make up about 7,500 hectares (19,000 acres) of which about 2,375 hectares (5,870 acres) have access to irrigation, while 600 hectares (1,500 acres) are non-irrigated. About 2,811 hectares (6,950 acres) are open water spaces of Lake Buhi, and other lakes and streams.

== Demographics ==
Population census of Buhi
Year	Pop.	±% p.a.
1903	9,692	—
1918	14,103	+2.53%
1939	22,391	+2.23%
1948	25,057	+1.26%
1960	37,786	+3.48%
1970	41,259	+0.88%
1975	44,226	+1.40%
1980	48,625	+1.91%
1990	57,496	+1.69%
1995	61,887	+1.39%
2000	67,762	+1.96%
2007	70,756	+0.60%
2010	73,809	+1.55%
2015	77,143	+0.84%
2020	81,306	+1.11%
2024	78,104	−0.96%
Source: Philippine Statistics Authority

In the 2024 census, the population of Buhi was 78,104 people, with a density of 320 inhabitants per square kilometre or 830 inhabitants per square mile.

The total population was 70,756 in 2007, with a growth rate of about 2.1%. The total number of households was 13,238 and with an average household size of 5 persons. At the 2010 census, the population has increased to 73,809 persons. The local language is Buhinon, a dialect of Bikolano.

Literacy rate of Buhi is about 99%. The labor force is about 24,000 people strong, or 63% of economically productive people age 15 to 64 years old.

8 out of 10 persons are Roman Catholics; Iglesia ni Cristo makes up about 2% of the total population which is the largest minority religion in the municipality.

=== Language ===
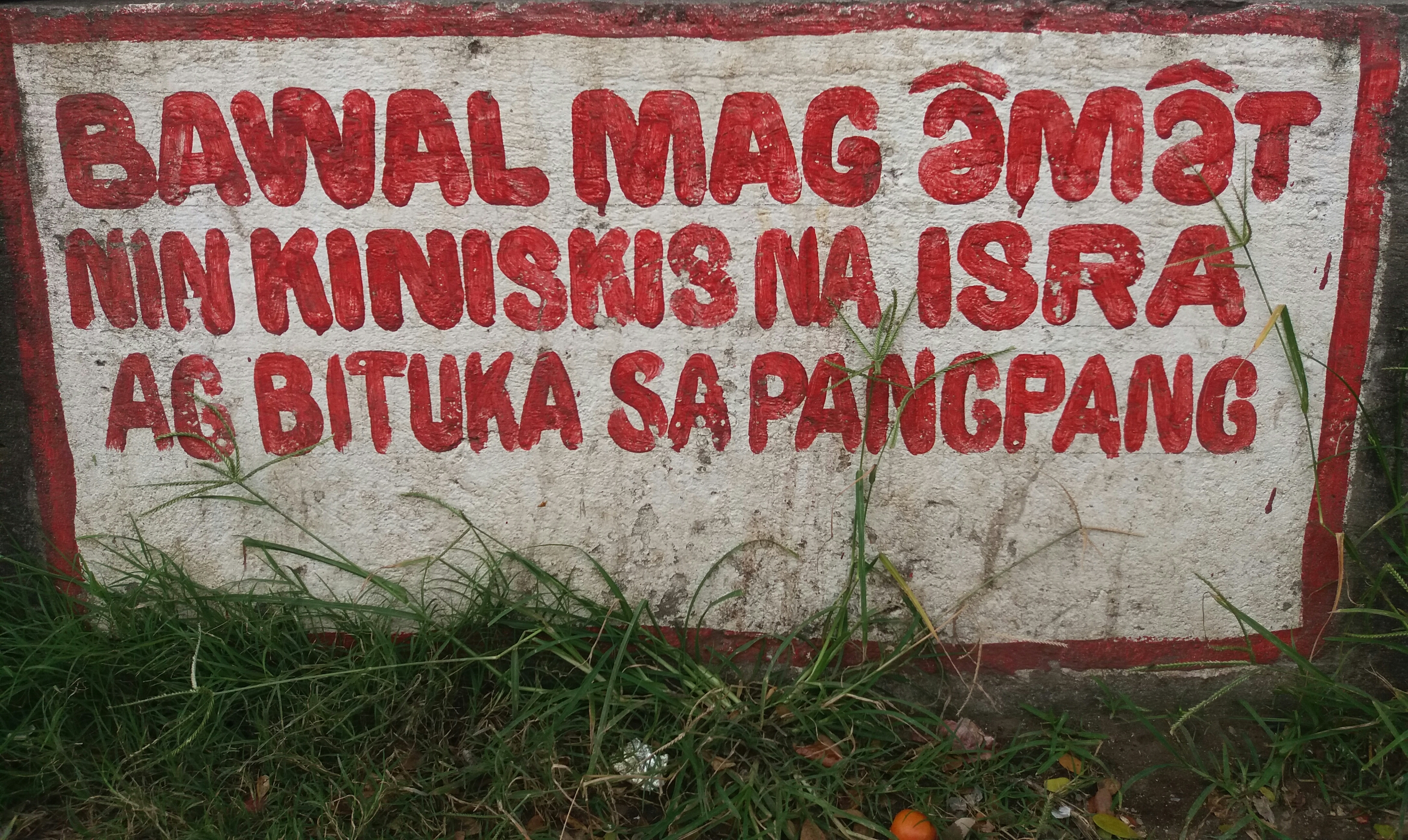
A signage in the local language (Disposing of fish scales and their innards on the lakeshore is prohibited.)

Buhinon is the mother tongue of the majority of the population especially those residing around the lake area with Rinconada Bikol as its first language especially the folks residing on the western part of the municipality near Iriga City. Buhinon is classified as a lone language, and the only one used in the province of Camarines Sur. Buhinon, the Albay Bikol languages, and Rinconada Bikol are members of Inland Bikol group of languages and share common vocabulary.

== Economy ==
Poverty incidence of Buhi (%)

Source: Philippine Statistics Authority

Two thirds of the population depend on agriculture. More than one-fifth of the total land area is devoted to agriculture primary crops are rice, corn, coconut, and abaca. Rice grows in the vast field of Road sector while corn and abaca are being grown at Mountain sector.

=== Spring Resorts ===
- Pongol Hot Spring
- Balerite Resort
- Lologon Resort
- Sinagpan Spring Resort

== Infrastructure ==
=== Utilities ===
Water supply:

- Rural Waterworks Multi-Purpose
- Cooperative provides the potable drinking water to at least 1,683 households in 7 suburban areas
- Burabod ririgusan- tubog Lourdes Buhi Camarines sur
- Magindara

Power and electricity:

- CASURECO III delivers electricity to 63% of households and business establishments and 97% of barangays
- Host to a 1.2 MW mini hydro-electric power plant of the National Power Corporation

== Transportation ==
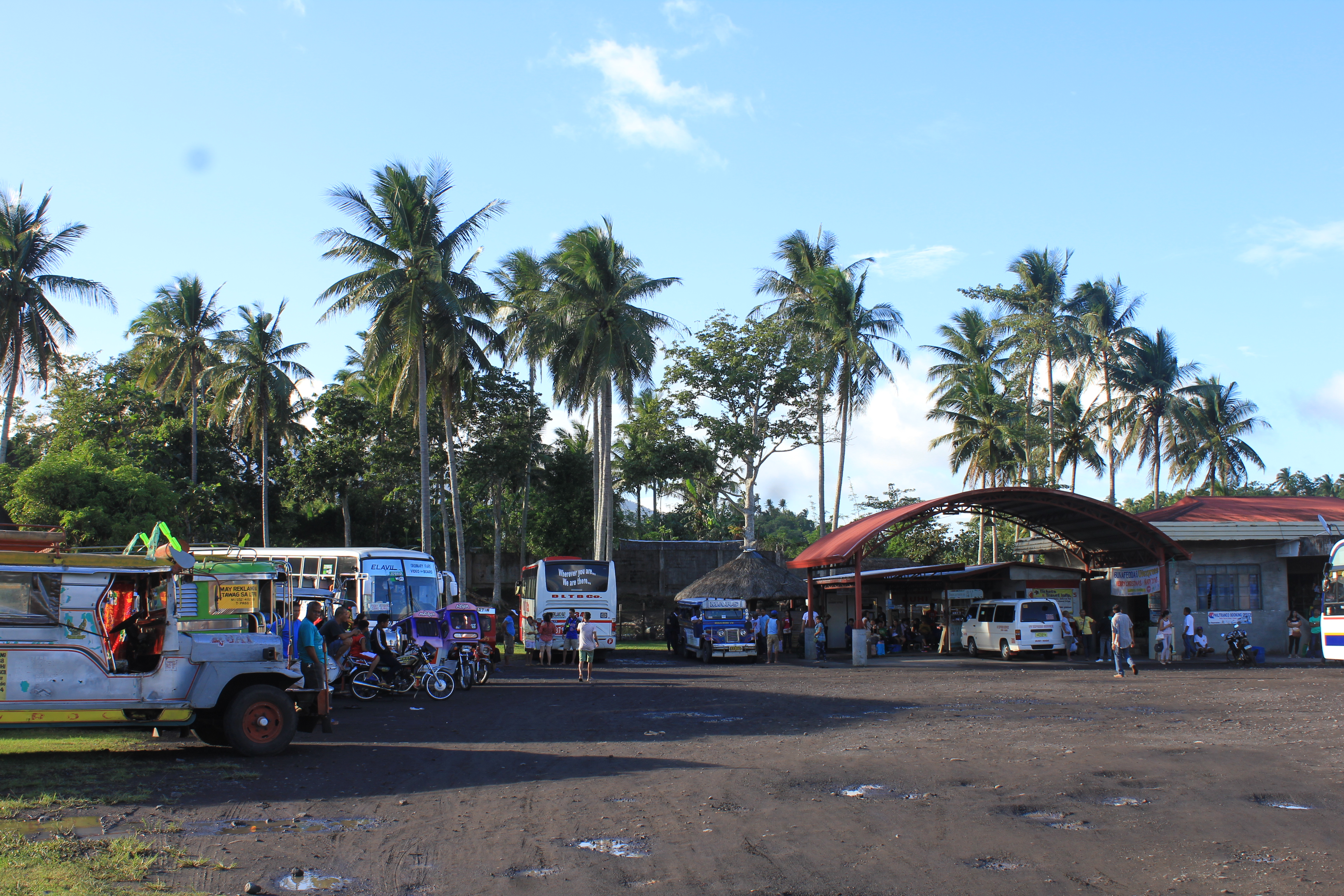
Buhi Terminal

Three major road networks that link the town to the adjacent province of Albay, Partido District and Iriga City. Most of its roads are gravel, especially those in the lake, road and mountain sectors.

- Presence of tricycles and jeepneys
- Presence of non-aircon and aircon buses
- Presence of motorized boats and bancas
- Presence of motorcycles called door-to-door

== Healthcare ==
Presence of 1 public hospital; 3 private medical clinics; 38 health stations/centers; 3 pharmacies

Public Hospital:

- Buhi Community Hospital (temporarily closed by DOH)

Private Clinics:

- Claveria Clinic
- Portugal Clinic
- Sabio-Valenciano Clinic

Dental Clinic

- CJR Berces Dental Clinic
- Dr. Wennie A. Samper Dental Clinic

== Education ==
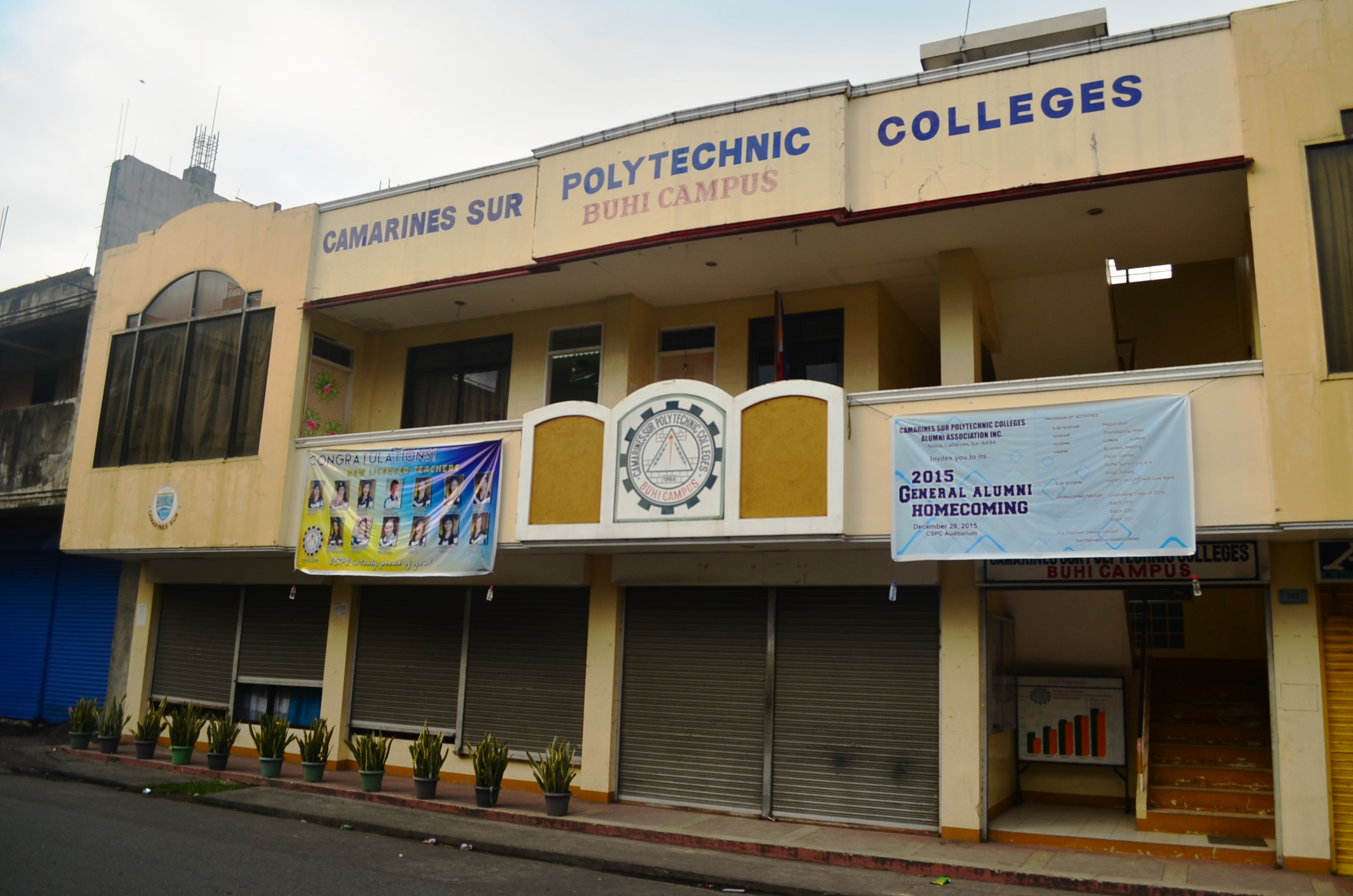
CSPC Buhi campus

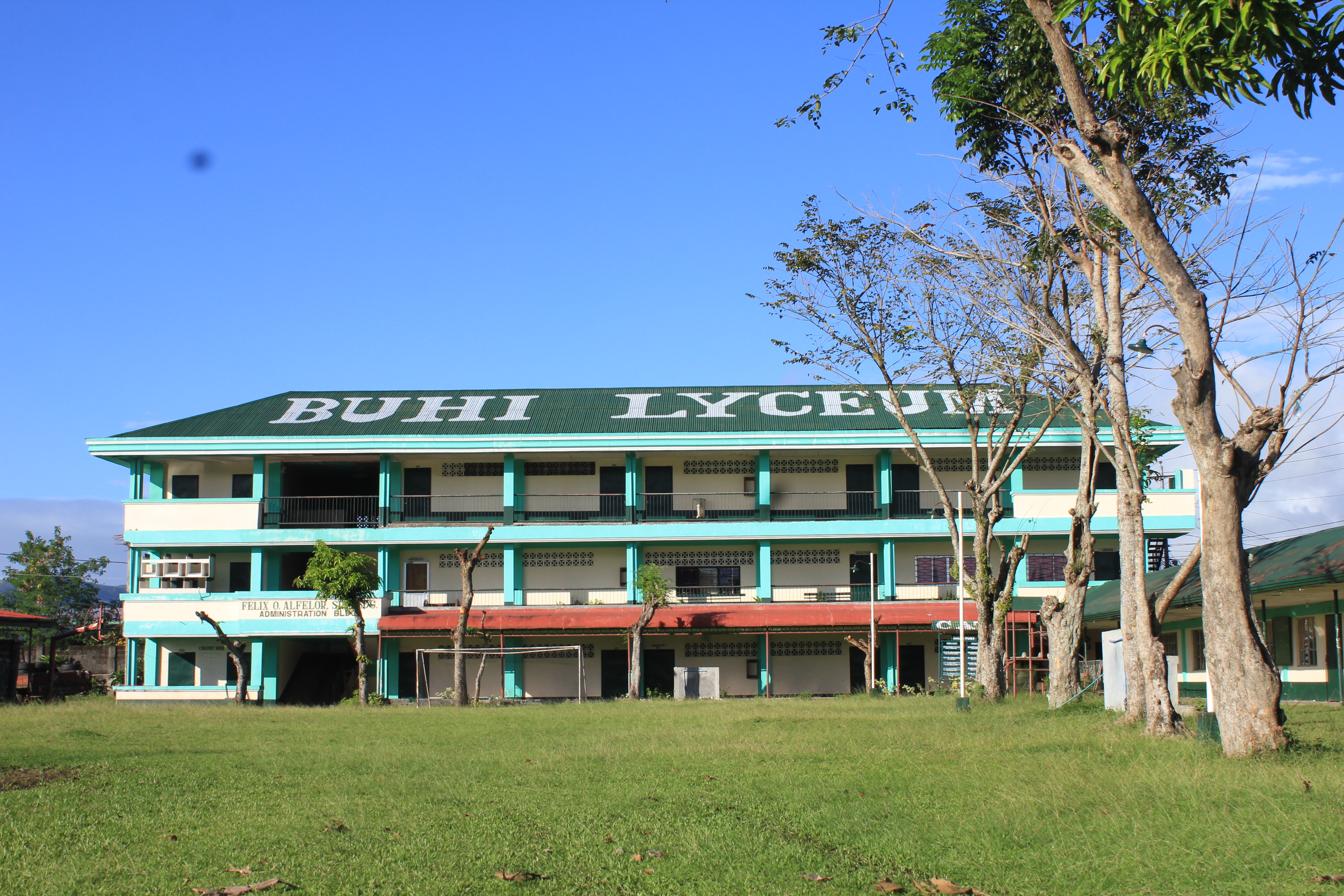
Buhi Lyceum

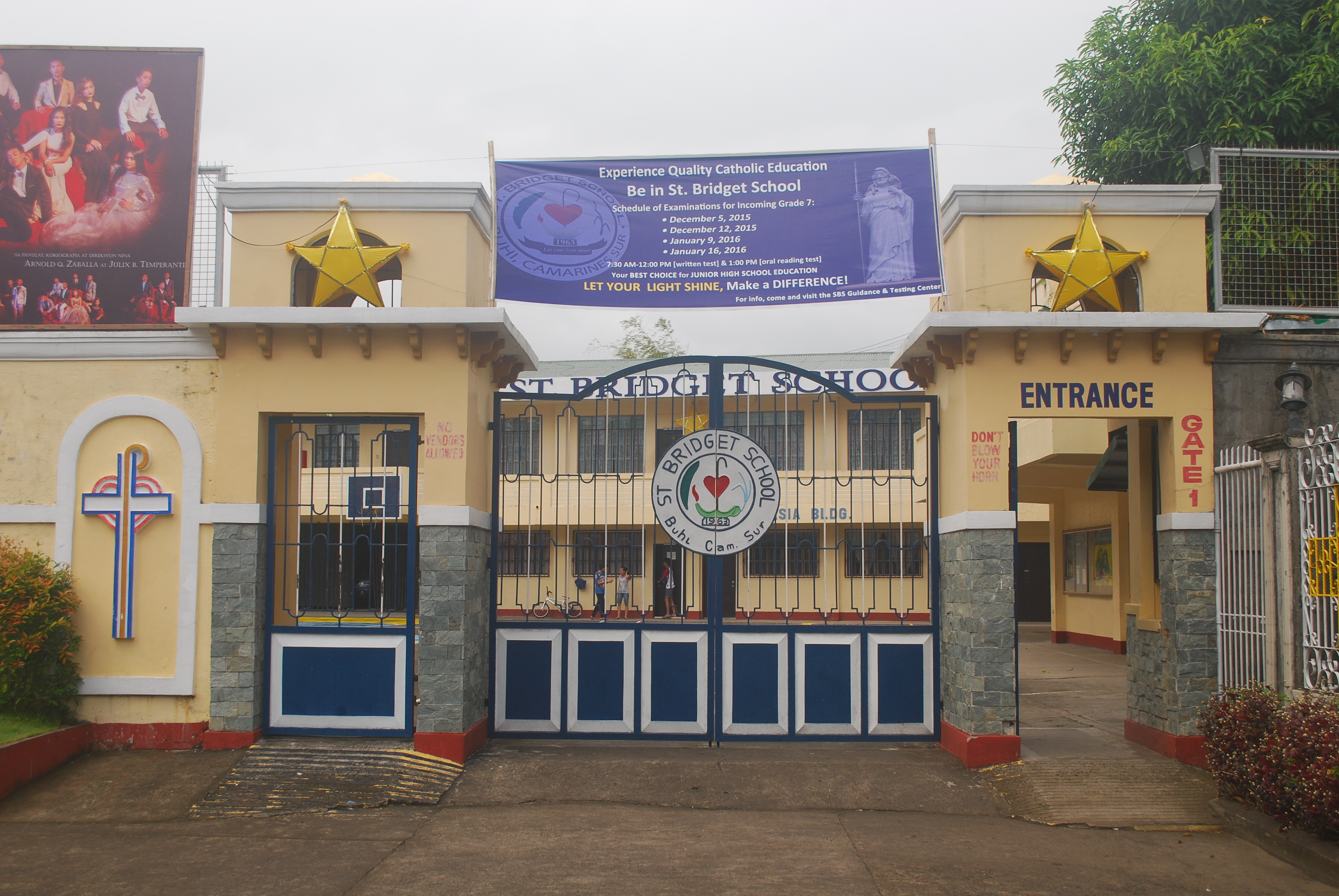
St. Bridget School

The Buhi Schools District Office governs all educational institutions within the municipality. It oversees the management and operations of all private and public, from primary to secondary schools.

=== Primary and elementary schools ===
- Amlongan Elementary School
- Antipolo Elementary School
- Buhi Central School
- Buhi Institute Foundation
- Buhi Lyceum
- Buhi North Central School
- Buhi SPED Center
- Buhi Southeastern Academy
- Burocbusoc Elementary School
- Cabatuan Elementary School
- Cagmaslog Elementary School
- Caloocan Elementary School
- De La Fe Elementary School
- Divino Rostro Elementary School
- Elen O. Villanueva School
- Gabas Elementary School
- Hansel & Gretel Foundation
- Holy Child Educational Center
- Ibayugan Elementary School
- Igbac Elementary School
- Ipil Elementary School
- Iraya Elementary School
- Labawon Elementary School
- Los Angeles Elementary School
- Lourdes Elementary School
- Macaangay Elementary School
- Maybatang Elementary School
- Monte Calvario Elementary School
- Mt. Zayith Faith Academy
- Namurabod Elementary School
- Penafrancia Elementary School (Tawagan Elementary School)
- Sagrada Elementary School
- Salay Elementary School
- Salvacion Elementary School
- San Isidro Elementary School
- San Rafael Elementary School
- San Ramon Elementary School
- San Vicente Elementary School
- Sta. Cruz Elementary School
- Sta. Isabel Elementary School
- Buhi SouthEast Central School formerly (Sta. Justina East Elementary School)
- Sta. Justina West Elementary School
- Sto. Nino Primary School
- Tambo Elementary School

=== Secondary schools ===
- Agapito de Lima National High School
- Buhi High School
- Buhi Lyceum
- Buhi SPED Integrated School
- Buhi Southeastern Academy
- Buhi St. Joseph's Academy
- Dautil-Watkins High School
- Iraya High School
- Los Angeles High School
- Salvacion High School
- San Vicente National High School
- St. Bridget School
- Sta. Justina National High School
- Tambo National High School

=== Higher educational institution ===
- Camarines Sur Polytechnic Colleges

== Media ==
=== FM stations ===
- 88.5 DWLF FM – Barita 88.5 (inactive)
- 97.7 DWEA FM – Buhi (Radyo Buhi, Numero Uno)
- 100.1 Radyo Natin Buhi
- 102.9 DWLR – Lauyay Radio (closed)

== Notable personalities ==
- Victor Wood – singer, actor, politician

== Gallery ==
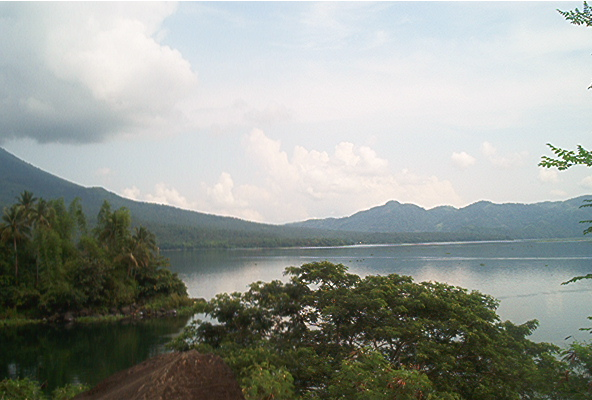
Lake Buhi

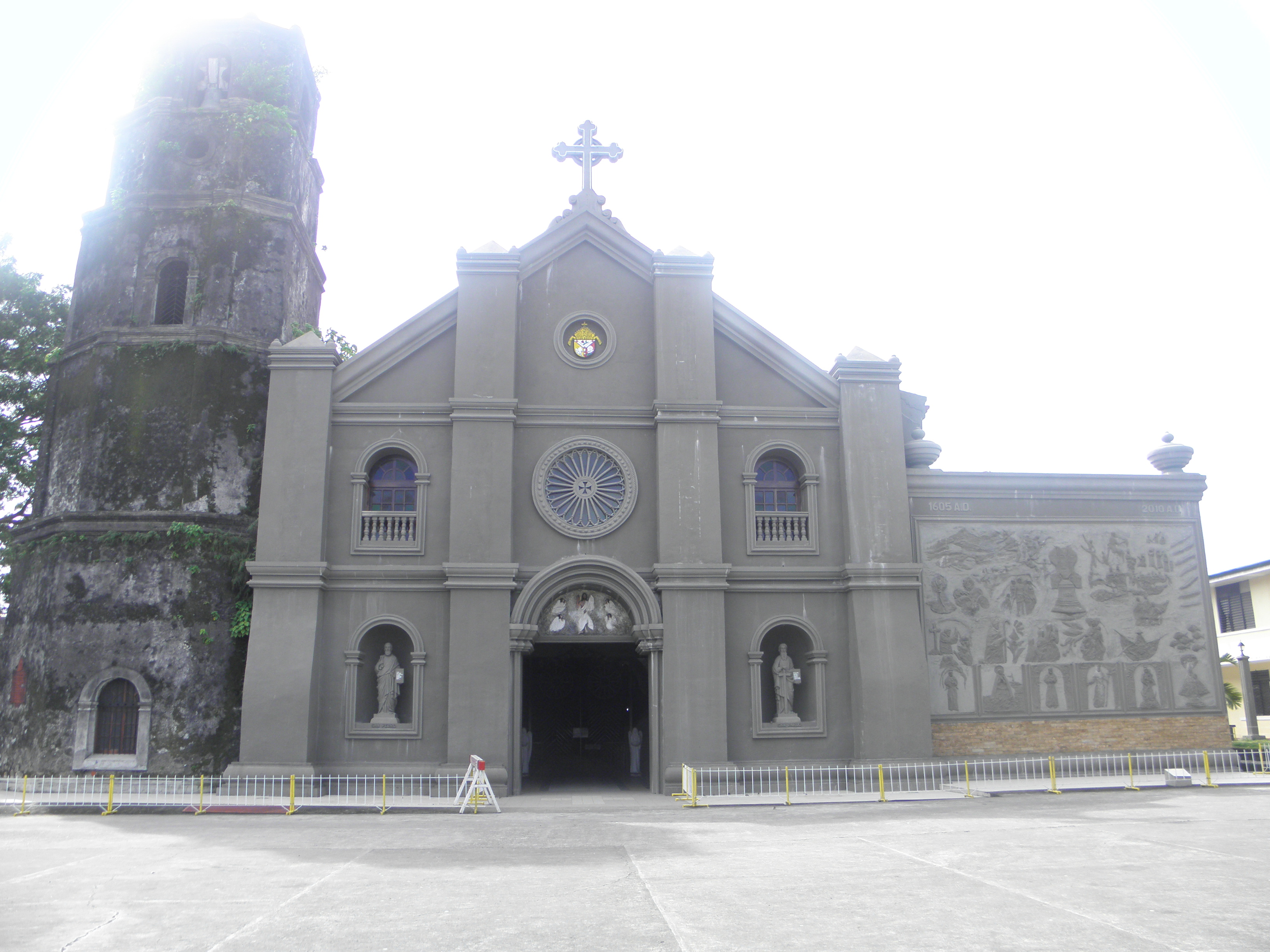
Buhi Church

Patio

Parish Pastoral Center

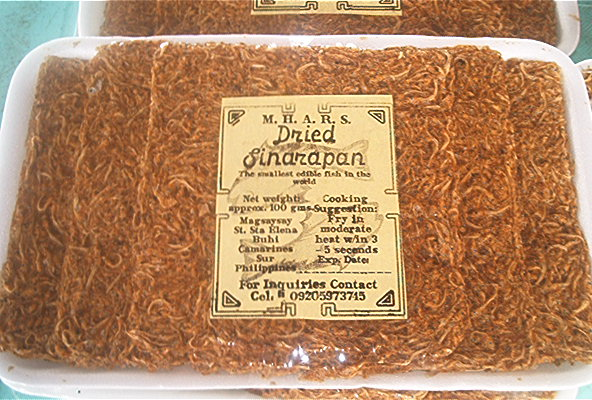
Baked "Sinarapan"
