= A Million Billion =

American musical group

- Origin: New York City, United States
- Genres: Indie, electronica
- Years active: 2005–present
- Label: EXERCISE1 Records (UK)
- Members: Ryan Smith; Michael Fadem; Jon Natchez; Kevin Thaxton; Gene Park

A Million Billion is an indie/electronica solo-project-turned-band from Brooklyn, New York. It was led by Ryan Ross Smith, a previous member of Stars Like Fleas and The Silent League.

Ryan Smith began to realise his own solo material in 2005 under the A Million Billion name, with the Today We Love You album and Filthy Schoolgirls EP. February 2006 saw the addition of Michael Fadem, Jon Natchez, Kevin Thaxton and Gene Park to the line-up, and a UK debut with the "Volcano Season" single on EXERCISE1 Records.

Today We Love You received a 2.5-star rating from Punknews.org.

== Discography ==
=== Singles and EPs ===
- Filthy Schoolgirls - June 15, 2005, EP
- "Volcano Season" - February 27, 2006, limited-edition single on EXERCISE1 Records

=== Albums ===
- Today We Love You - August 30, 2005, Album on Filthy Schoolgirls
