= Santo Tomas de Villanueva Church =

Roman Catholic church in Pasig, Philippines

- Iglesia Santo Tomás de Villanueva (Spanish)
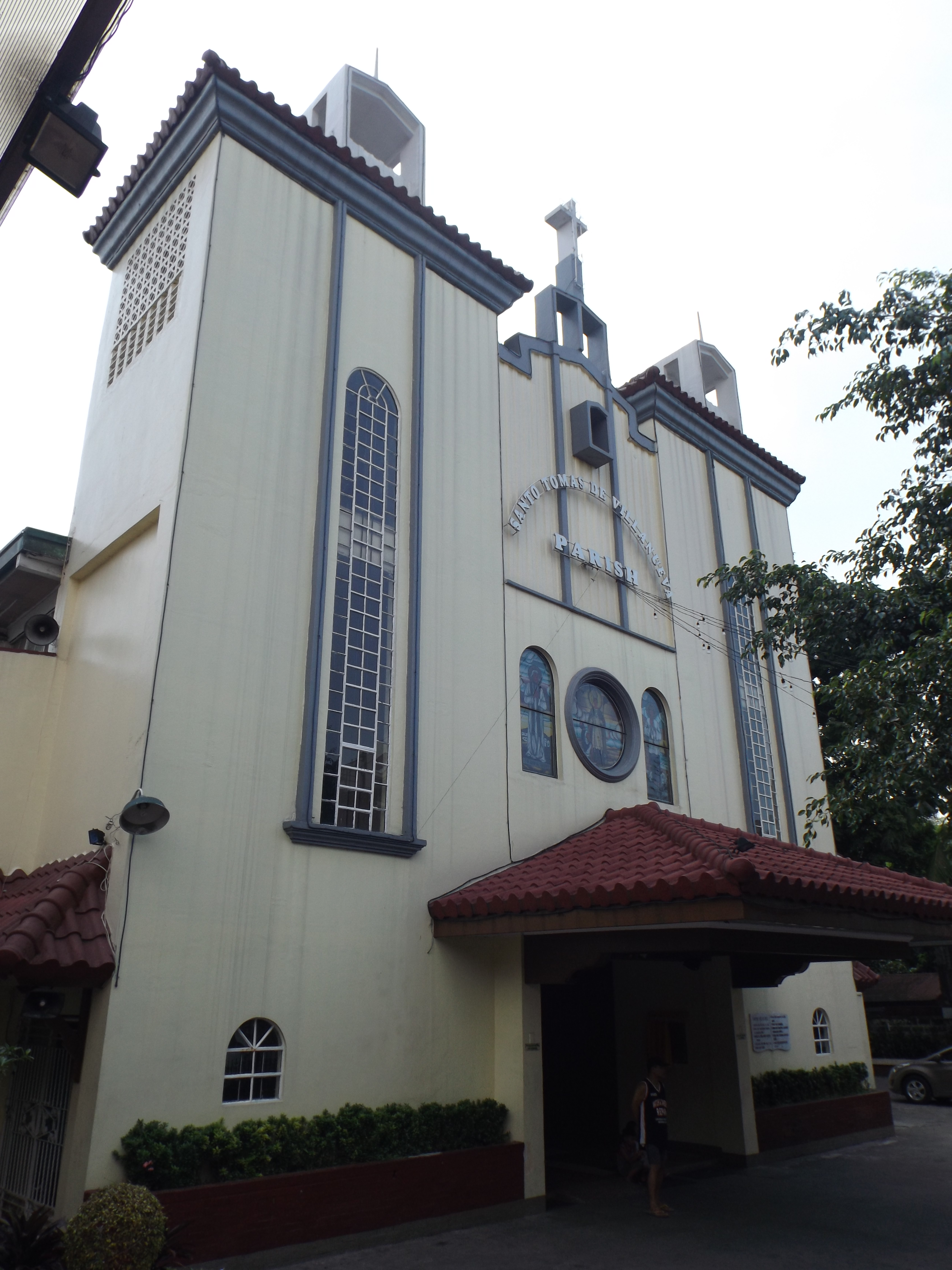
- Church facade in 2014
- Santo Tomas de Villanueva Church
- 14°36′51″N 121°04′59″E
- Location: Evangelista Street, Santolan, Pasig
- Country: Philippines
- Denomination: Roman Catholic
- Website: parish.stvpasig.org

History
- Founded: November 8, 1953
- Founder: Conrado Arciaga

Architecture
- Functional status: Active
- Architectural type: Church building
- Style: Modern

Administration
- Diocese: Pasig

Clergy
- Priest: Reynaldo Reyes

Santo Tomas de Villanueva Church is a Roman Catholic church and the fourth oldest parish in the Diocese of Pasig in the Philippines. Santolan's 200-year-old patron saint is Thomas of Villanova, an Augustinian bishop and man of charity but unknown in the Manila area.

The jurisdiction of the parish is as follows: Santolan (North), Marikina River (West), Maybunga San Miguel (South), Cainta, Rizal (East). The church enshrines the 19th century Virgin Mary, said to be different among others, for she has a moon underneath her feet.

The parish is one of the three other parishes in the Diocese of Pasig that has been granted the special papal blessing to mark its Diamond Jubilee Year in connection with its 60th anniversary.

== History of the parish ==
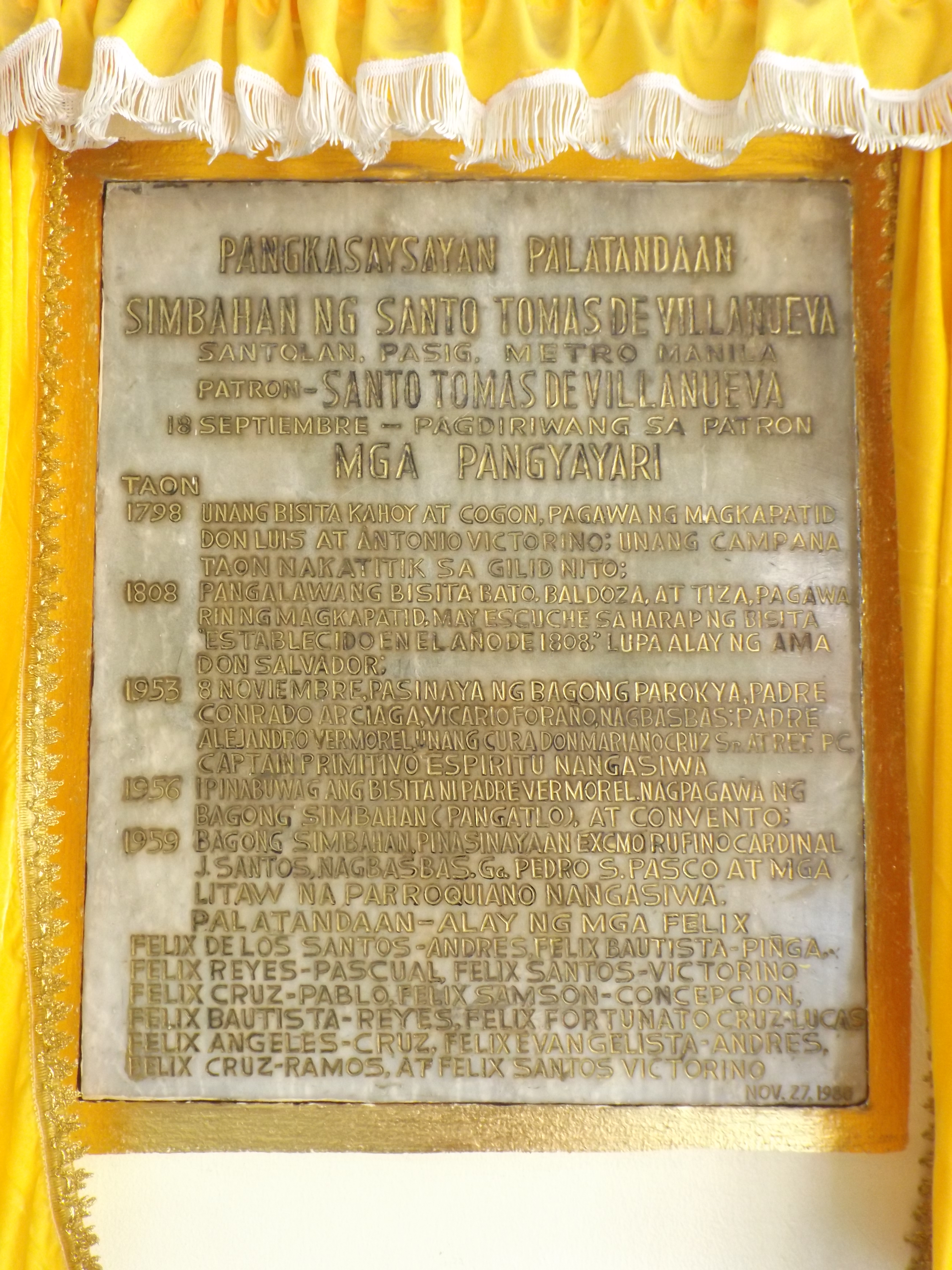
Parish history

In 1798, the first chapel made of wood and cogon was built in Santolan by siblings Don Luis and Antonio Victorino. A second chapel made of stone, chalk and tiles was built in the year 1808 by the siblings. It was the biggest chapel built in Pasig. The parish was then established on November 8, 1953, after more than 100 years by Conrado Arciaga. The first parish priest was Alejandro Vermorel who served from 1953 to 1956. In 1956, he proposed the construction of a bigger church and convent. The church was then built with the help of this parish priest's fund-raising activity. By the year 1959, Archbishop Rufino Santos blessed the new church.

== Architecture of the present church ==
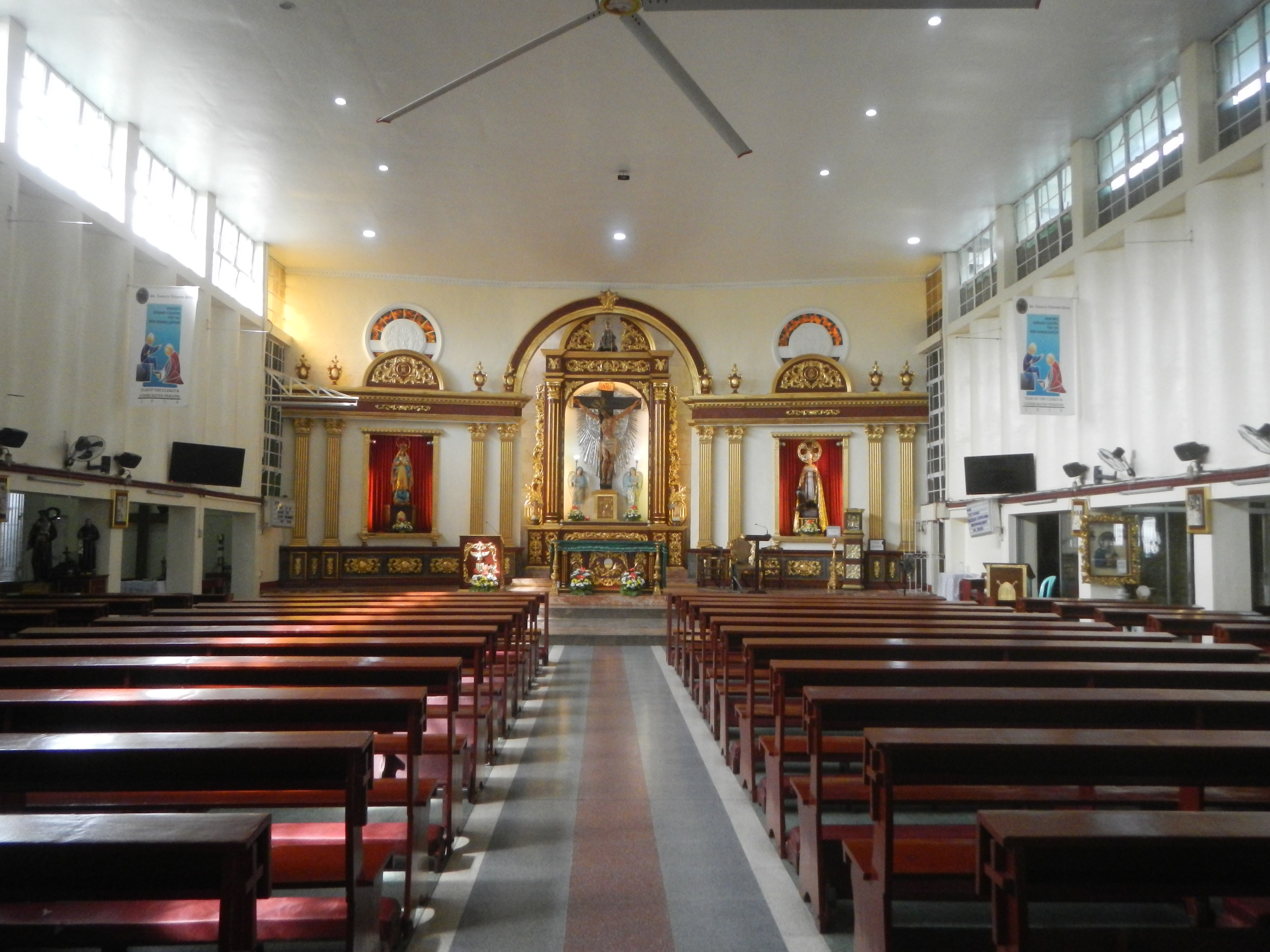
Church interior in 2018

The church at present, is a modernized structure with art deco design. Walls are made of concrete. The roofing at the entrance door are made of tiles.

== Pilgrim Church ==
Santo Tomas de Villanueva Church was declared a pilgrim church by Pope Francis in a papal decree dated April 17, 2013, to mark its 60th anniversary and to celebrate the Diamond Jubilee year. The other three pilgrim churches covered by the Pasig diocese are the Shrine of Saint Anne in Santa Ana, Taguig; Sto. Rosario de Pasig Parish in Rosario, Pasig; and Our Lady of the Holy Rosary Parish in Lower Bicutan, Taguig.

== Gallery ==
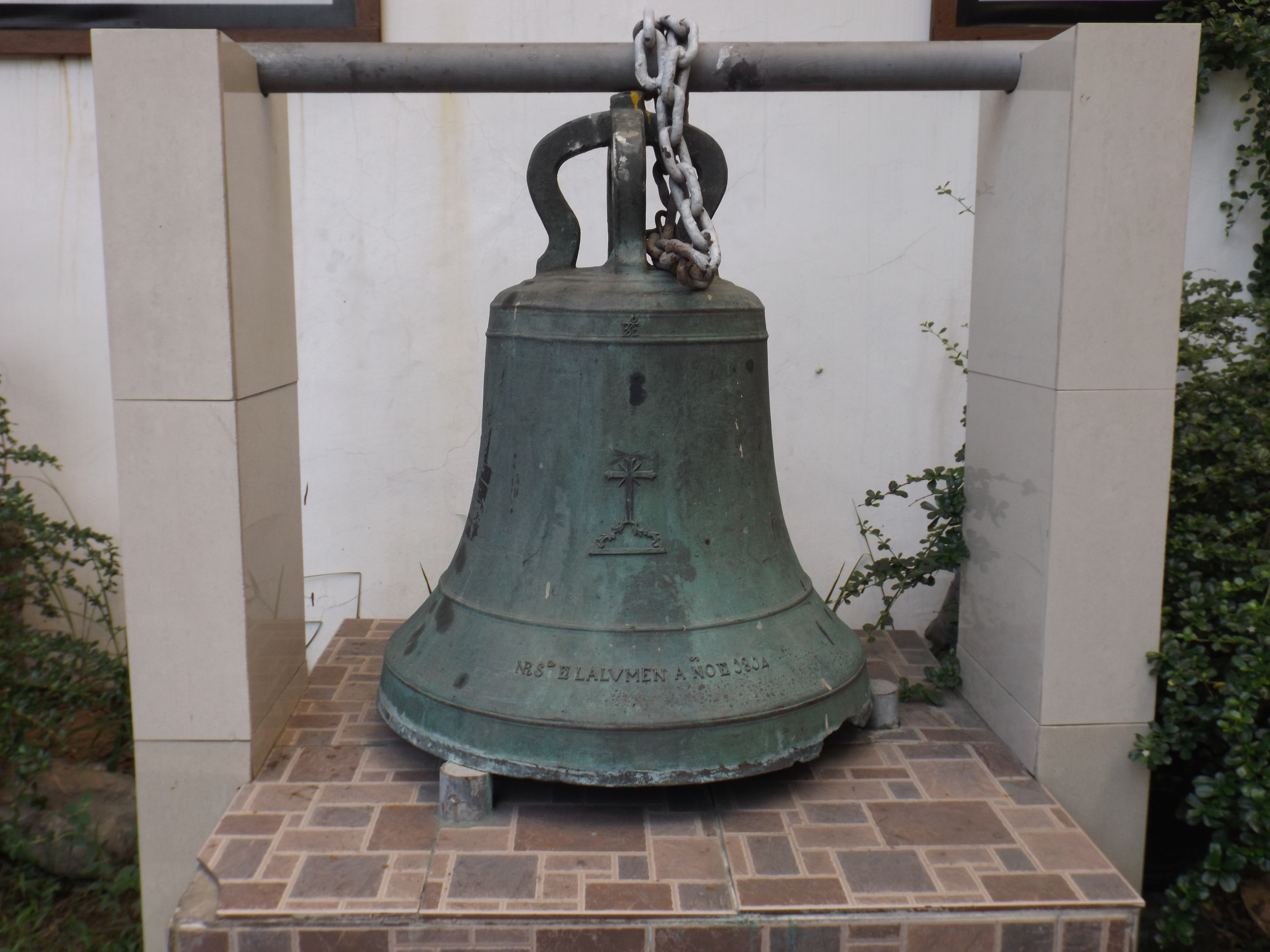
An old bell

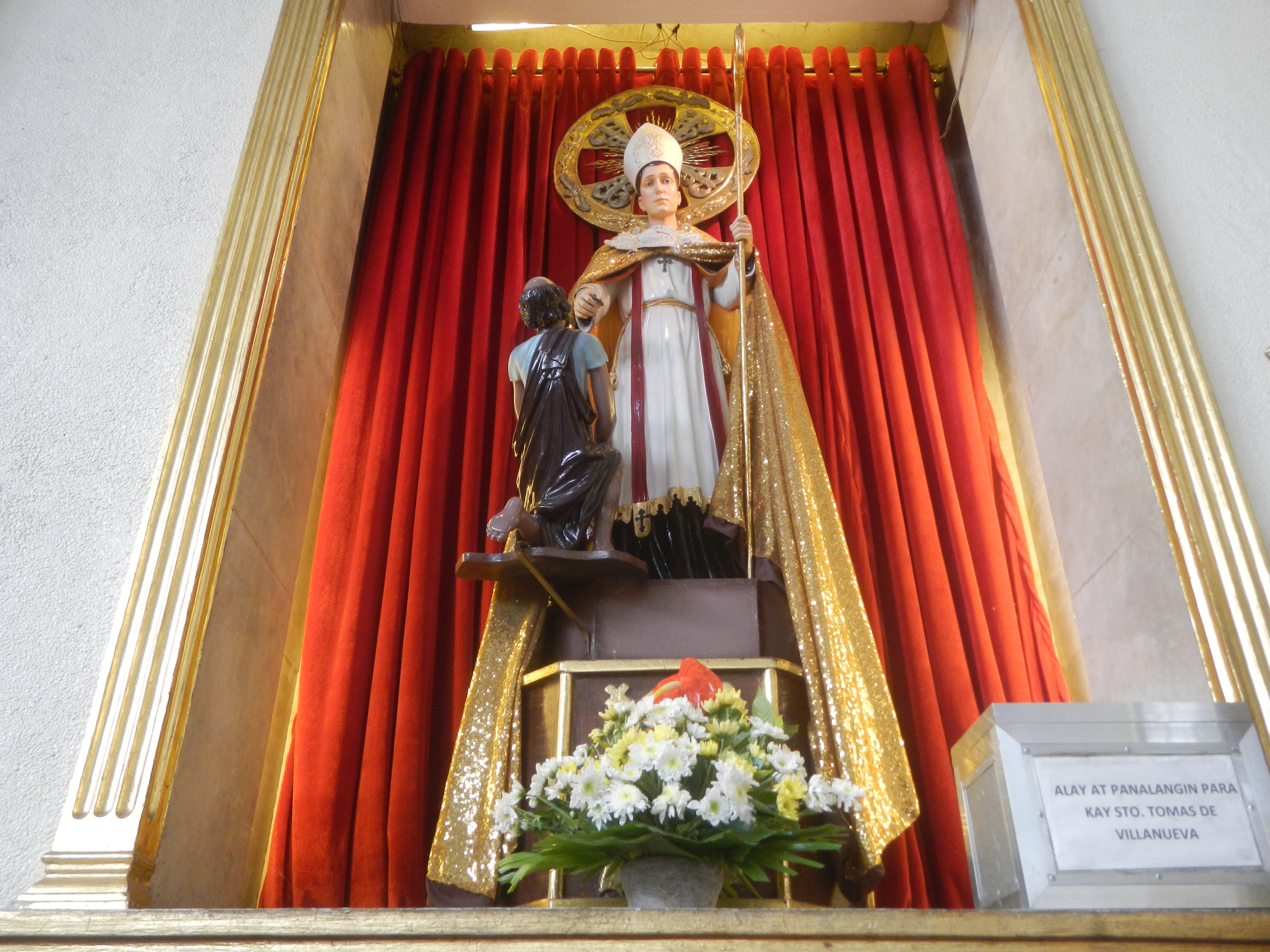
Saint Thomas of Villanova

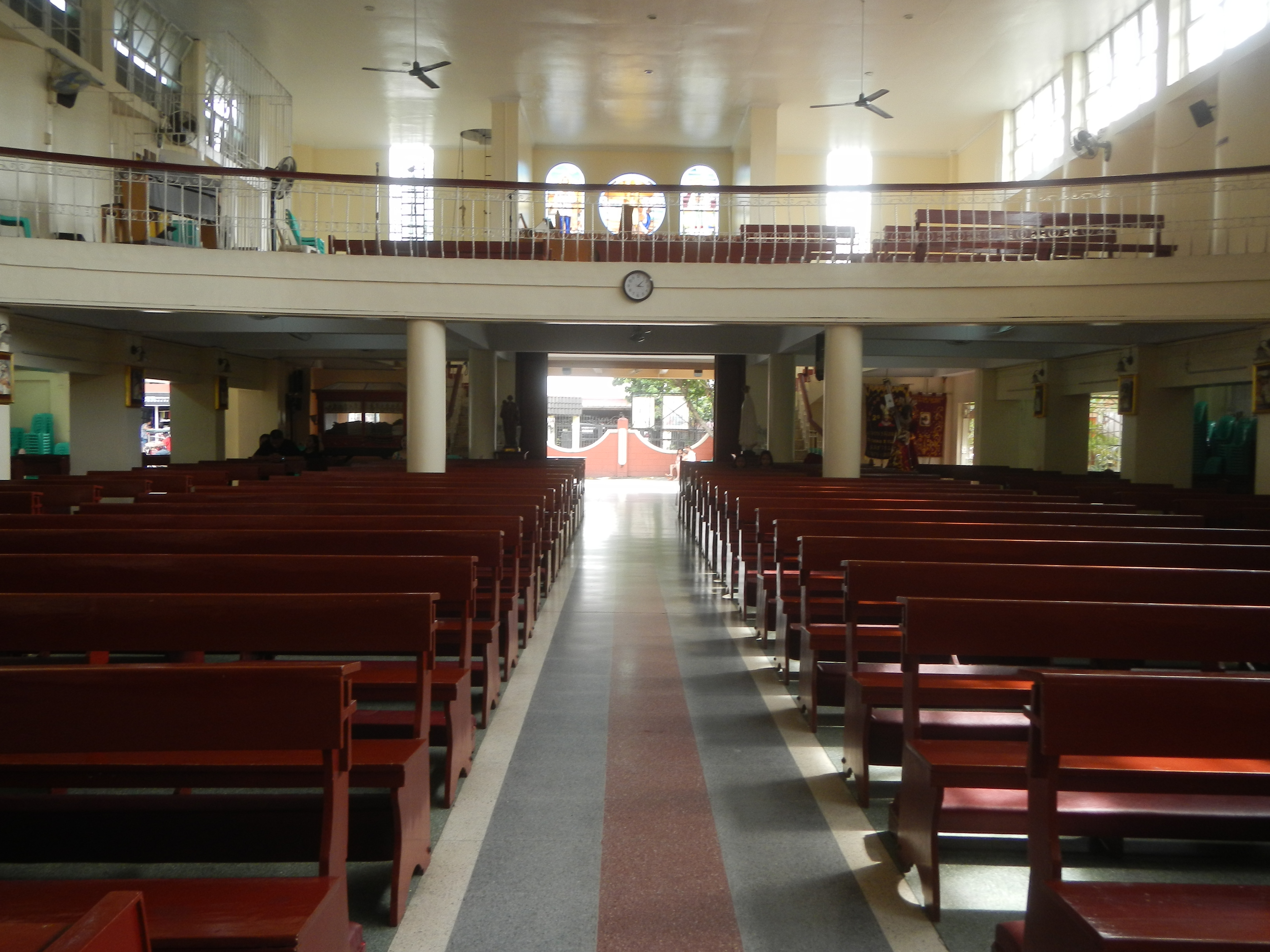
Choir loft

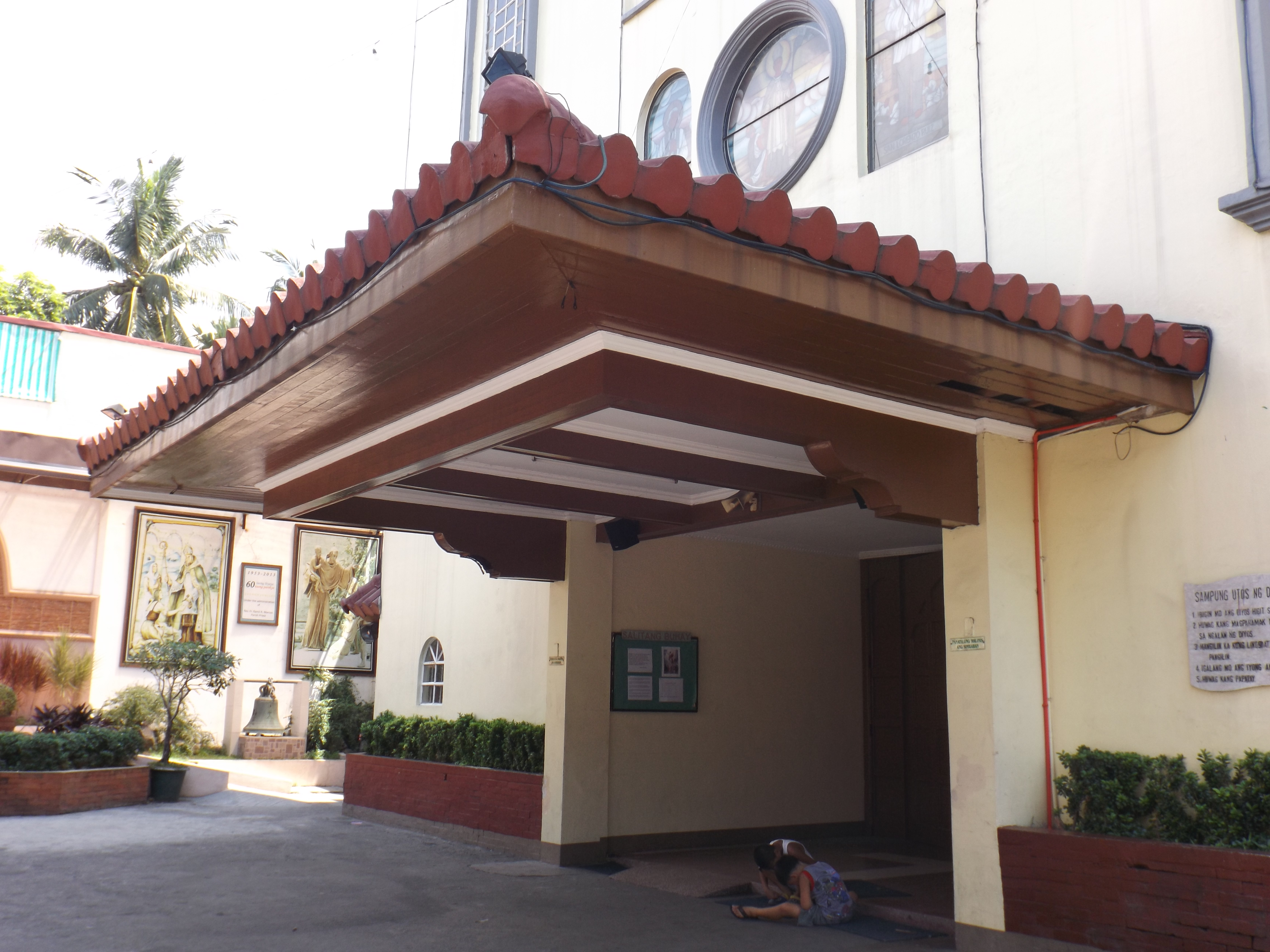
Roof of the main door
