= Santo Rosario de Pasig Church =

Roman Catholic church in Pasig, Philippines

- Iglesia Santo Rosario de Pasig (Spanish)
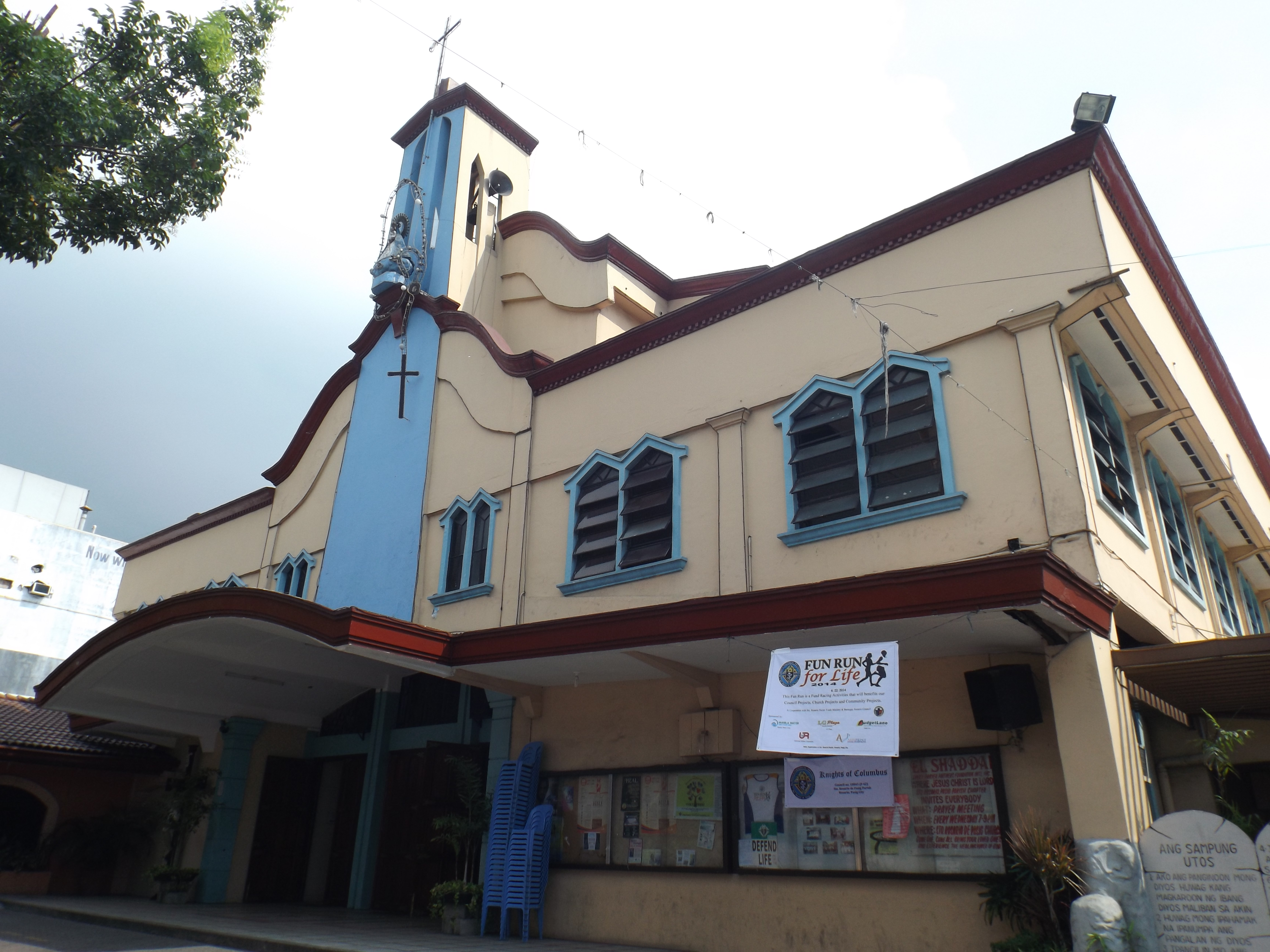
- Church facade in 2014
- Santo Rosario de Pasig Church
- 14°35′27″N 121°05′14″E
- Location: Ortigas Avenue Extension, Pasig
- Country: Philippines
- Denomination: Roman Catholic

History
- Former name: Immaculate Conception Parish
- Founded: February 23, 1963
- Founder: Rufino J. Santos

Architecture
- Architect: J. Mijares Construction
- Architectural type: Church building
- Style: Modern

Administration
- Diocese: Pasig

Clergy
- Priest: Fr. Roy M. Rosales

Santo Rosario de Pasig Church, formerly known as Immaculate Conception Parish, is a Roman Catholic church in Pasig, Philippines. It is under the jurisdiction of the Diocese of Pasig. The jurisdiction of the parish is as follows: Santolan (North), Marikina River (West), Maybunga San Miguel (South), Cainta, Rizal (East). The church enshrines the 19th century Virgin Mary, said to be different among others, for she has a moon underneath her feet.

The parish is one of the three other parishes in the Roman Catholic Diocese of Pasig that has been granted the special papal blessing to mark its Jubilee Year in connection with its 50th anniversary.

== Parish history ==
=== Early years ===
Victor de Clerck built the first chapel at the site in 1955.

During those times, farming and clay-pot making were the residents' primary means of livelihood. The number of residents increased and the mode of living changed when new factories and residential subdivisions were constructed.

=== 1963–1967 ===
On February 23, 1963, the Archbishop of Manila, Cardinal Rufino Santos created a decree that erected the Parish of Santo Rosario de Pasig and separated it from the Immaculate Conception Parish. It was in the same year when Vicente M. Planta was installed as its first parish priest. He led the formation of different organizations like Legion of Mary, Catholic Women’s League, Young Christian Workers and other groups. He stayed at the Philippine Orthopedic Center now National Orthopedic Hospital, since there was no rectory at that time.

In 1965, the Archdiocese of Manila bought 2,000 square metres (22,000 sq ft) of lot. Two hectares of it was donated to the parishes of Cainta and Sto. Rosario for agricultural purposes.

=== 1967–1979 ===
Teodoro Perez was installed as the new parish priest in 1967. There was still no rectory, so he stayed at the Immaculate Concepcion Parish in Pasig for half a year.

On February 10, 1967, a new church and convent were built after selling the lot acquired from the Immaculate Concepcion Parish in Pasig, fund-raising, and participation of the Pastoral Council under Sebastian Sandoval. J. Mijares Constructions won the bid to construct it.

On October 10, 1970, the first Mass was held under the supervision of the Parish Council headed by Oscar F. Zapanta. The Archbishop of Manila, Cardinal Rufino Santos, blessed the church on February 29, 1971, under the Patronage of Our Lady of the Holy Rosary. The feast day is celebrated on a Sunday closest to October 7.

== Renovations ==
=== 1987–1991 ===
A 3-storey building beside the church was completed under Julio Cesar M. Manalo's tenure as a parish priest.

=== 1991–1996 ===
The Blessed Sacrament Chapel was constructed and blessed by Bishop Protacio G. Gungon on September 4, 1992. The church's facade was improved by the Adoracion Nocturna Filipina - Rosario Chapter. Church repainting was also done.

=== 1996–2000 ===
The altar was repainted and the entire church and rectory were remodelled.

== Architecture of the present church ==
The church has undergone a lot of renovations. At present, it is a modernized structure with Art Deco design. Walls are made of concrete. The church has a high ceiling that promotes ventilation and steel framing to support its structure. Since it is well-lighted, it doesn't need artificial lighting at daytime. Stained glass is used for the windows.

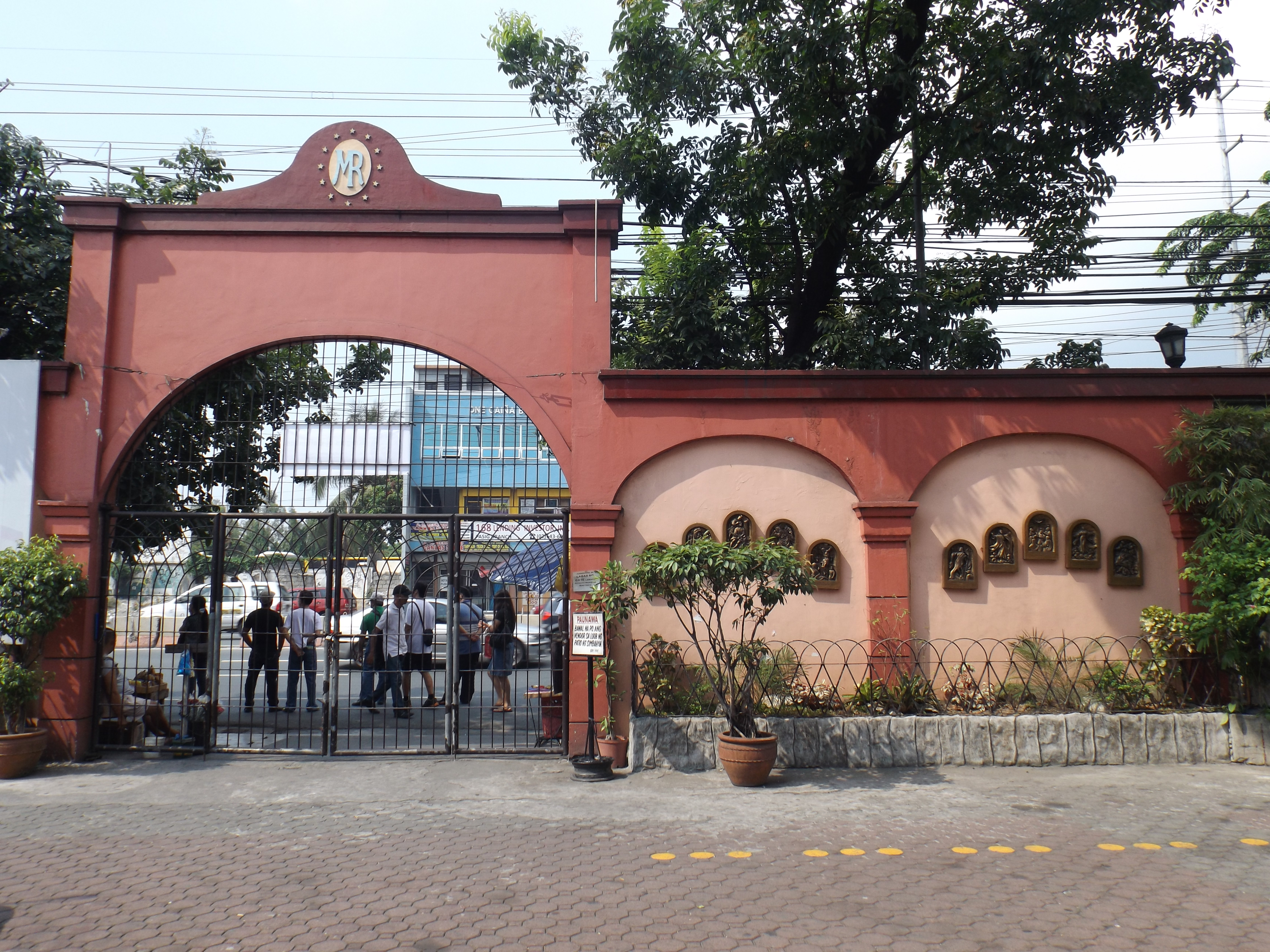
Rear of the main entrance

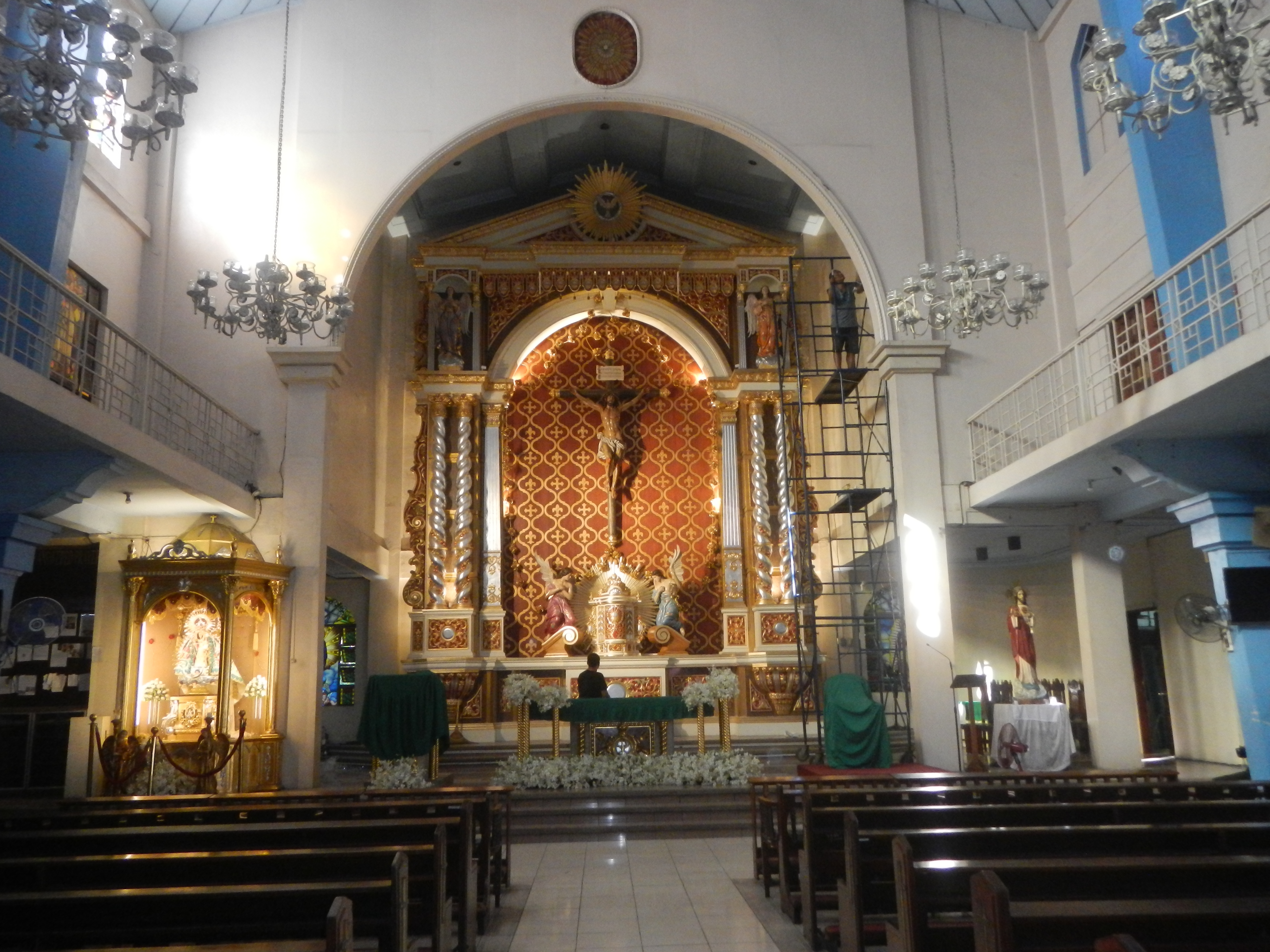
Church interior in 2017

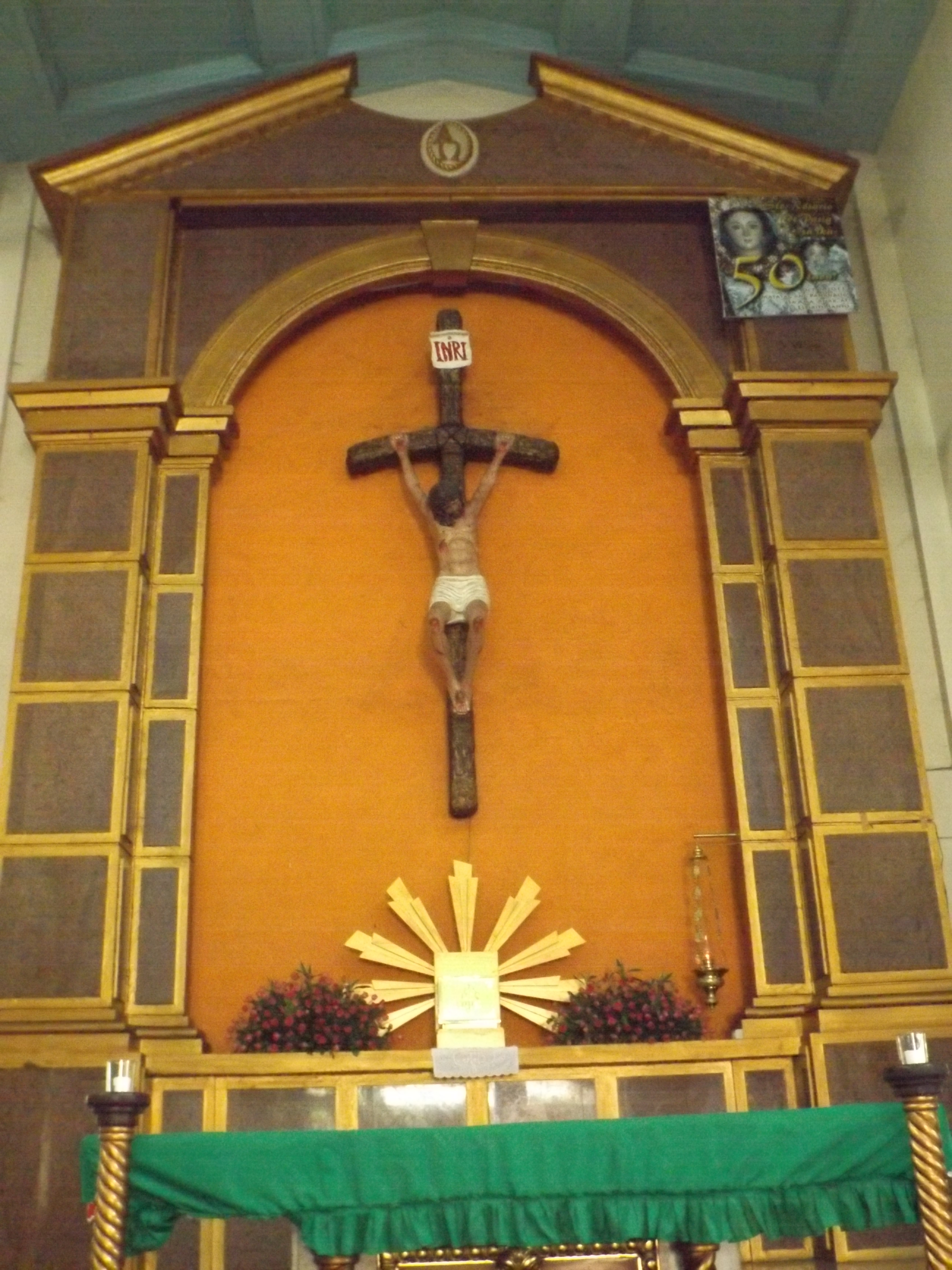
The crucifix

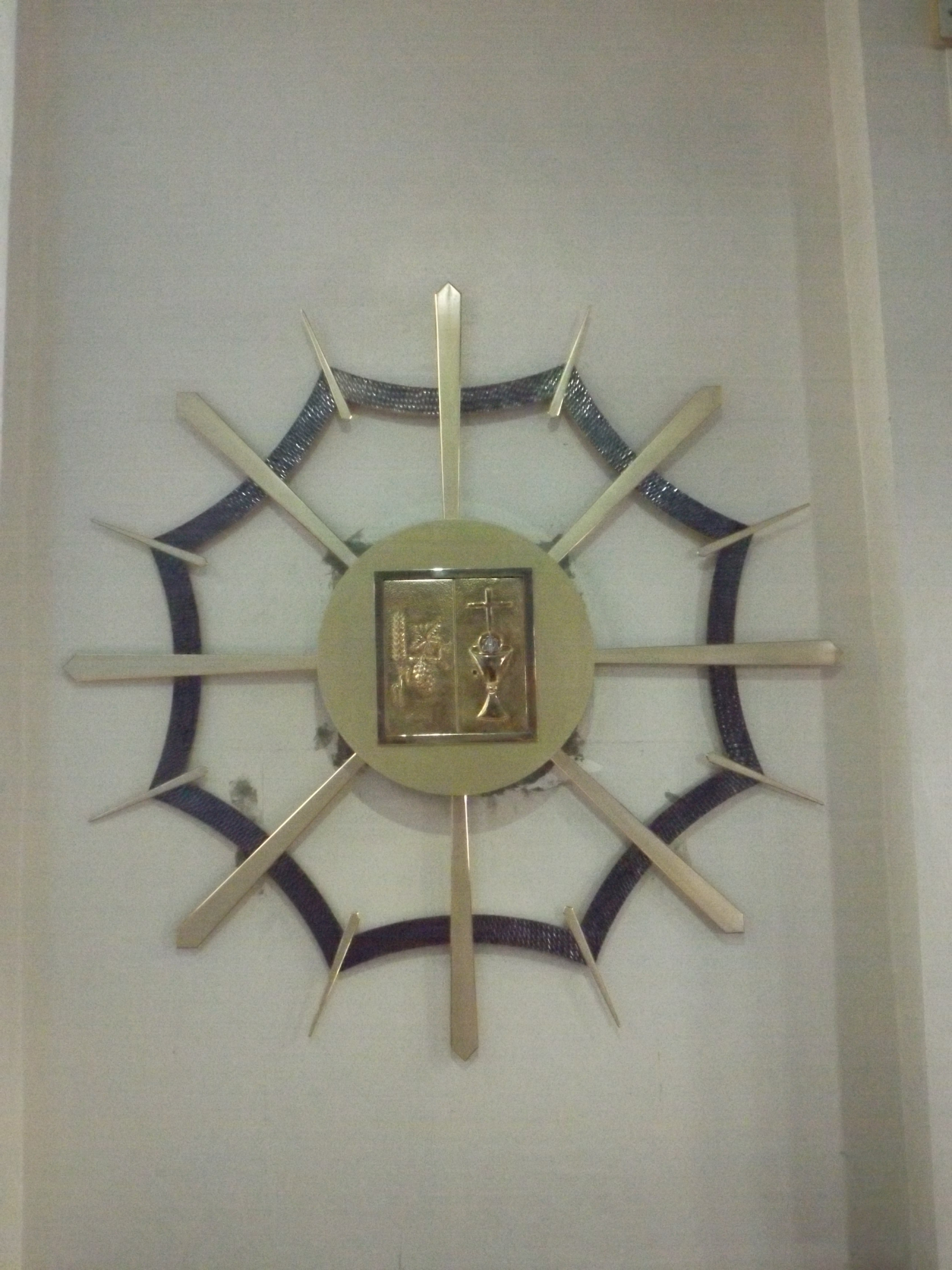
The tabernacle

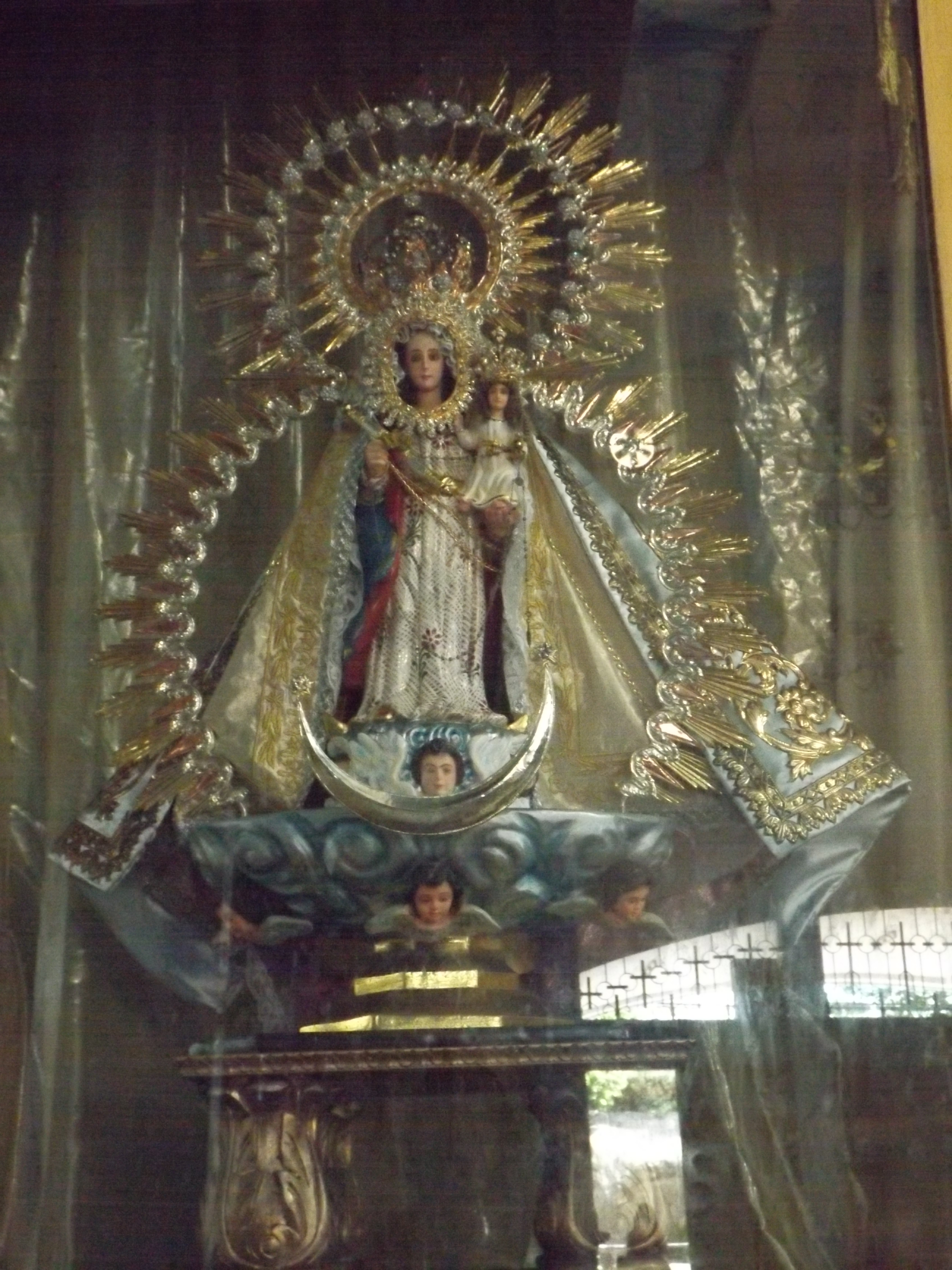
Our Lady of the Rosary

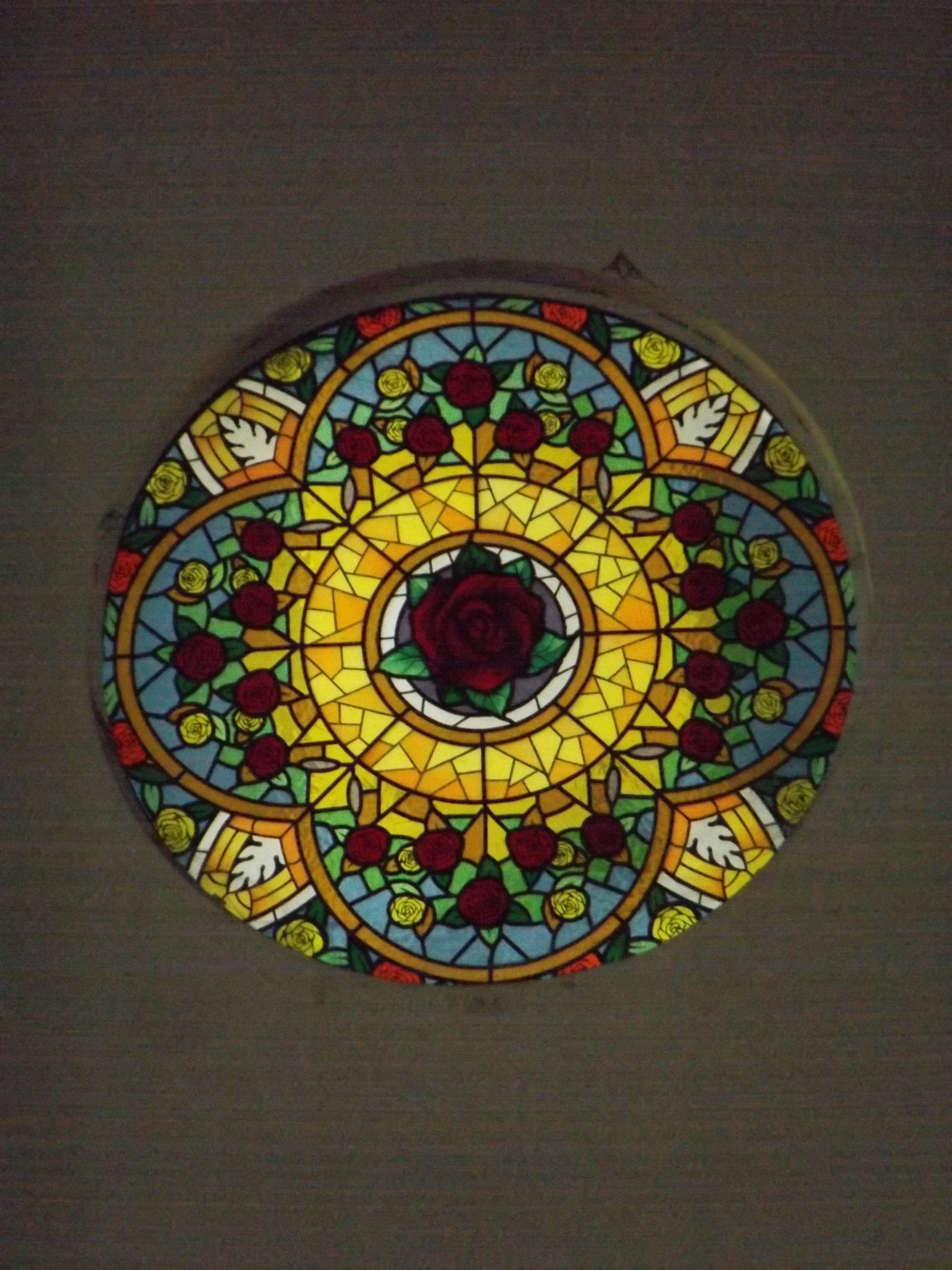
The rose window

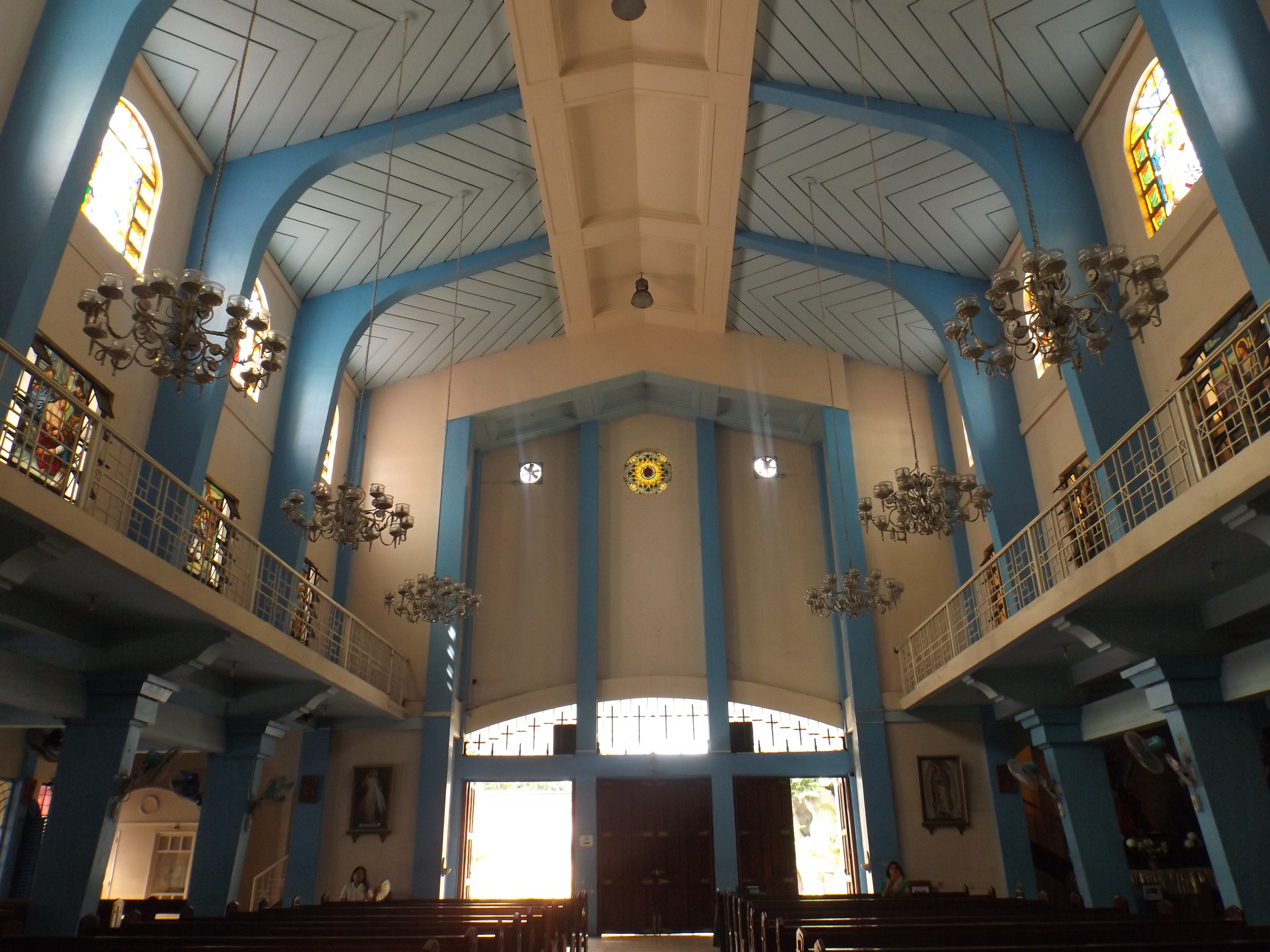
Church interior (rear)

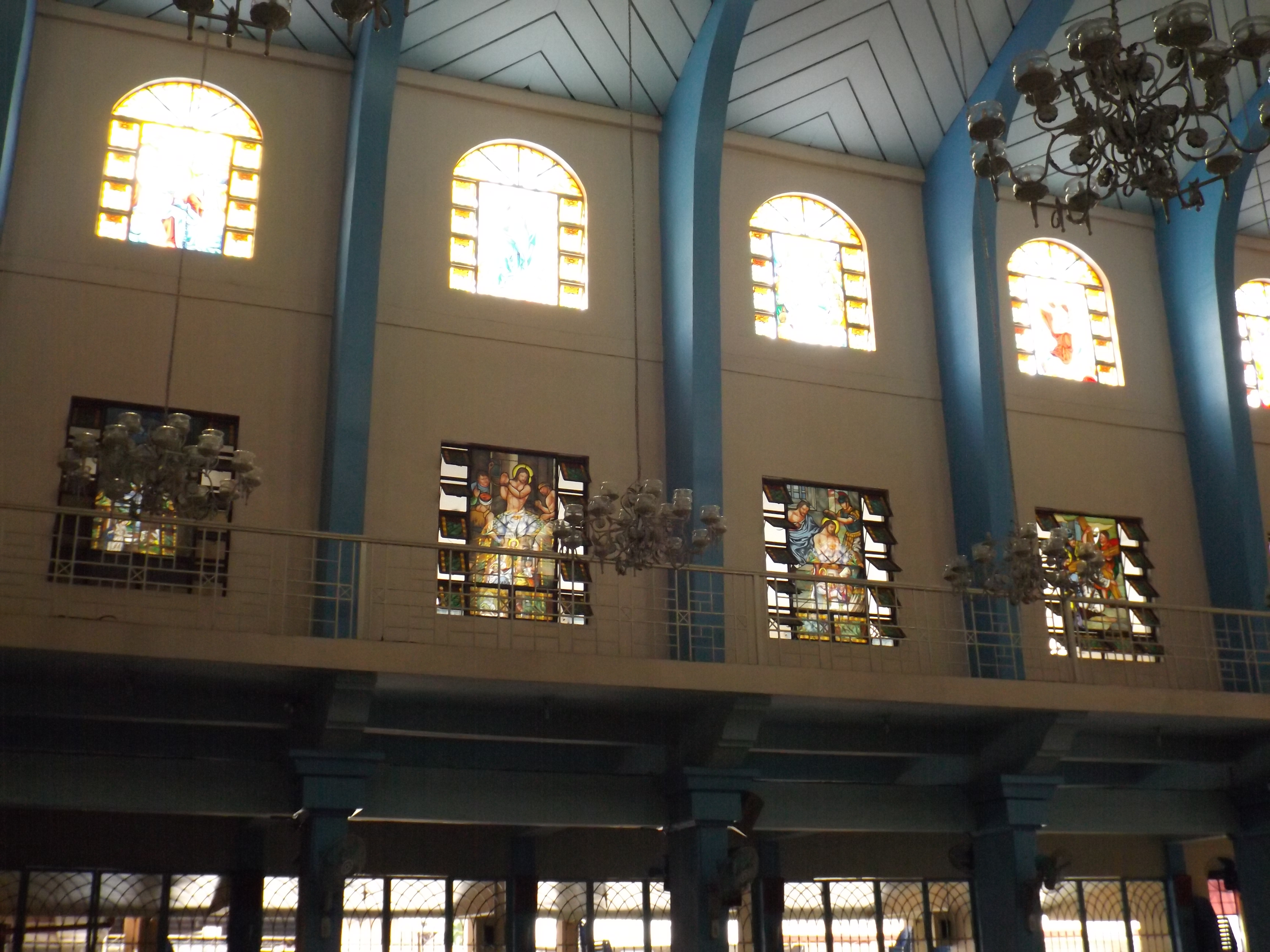
Stained glass windows (right wall)

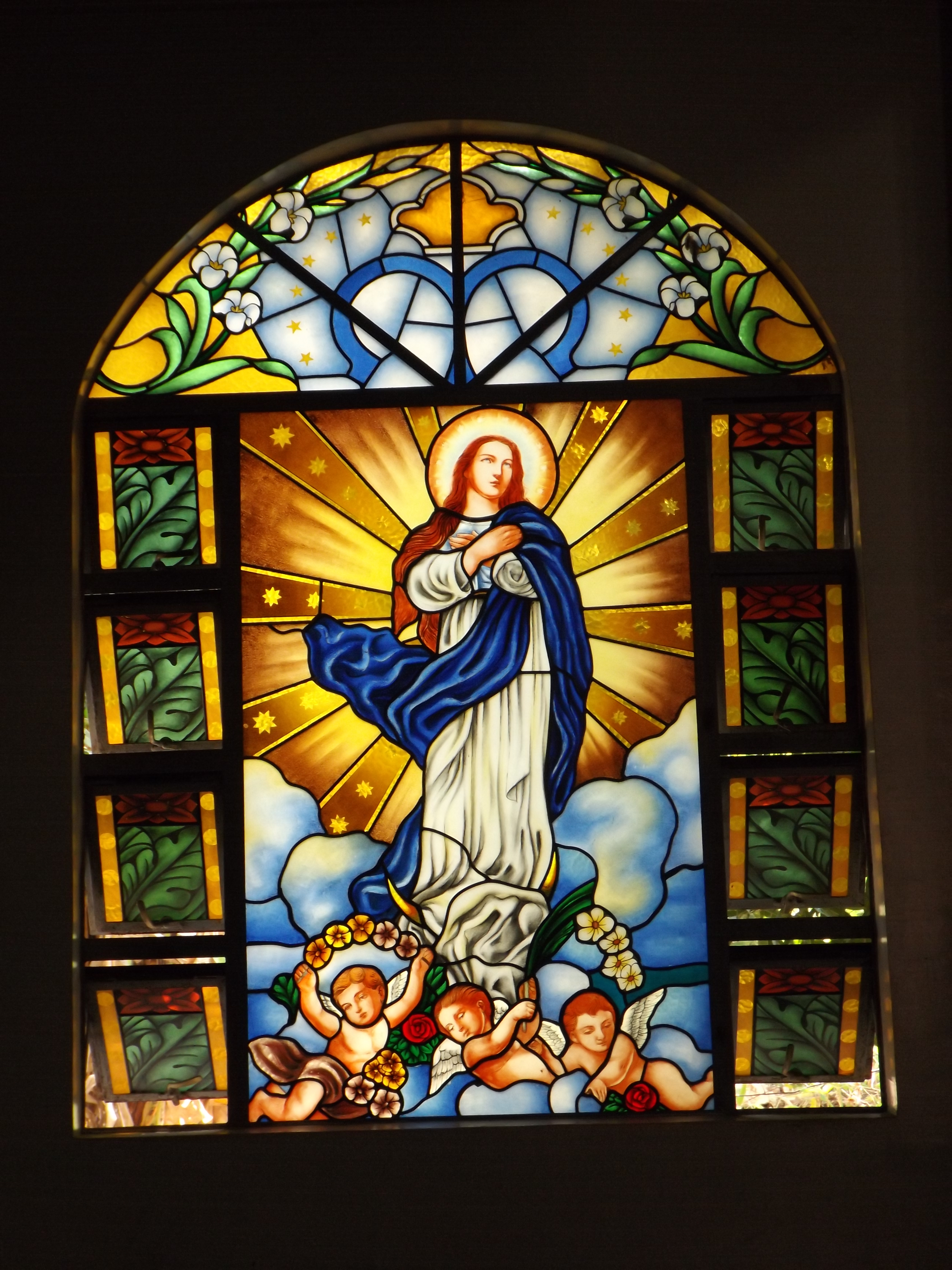
Stained glass at the altar (left)

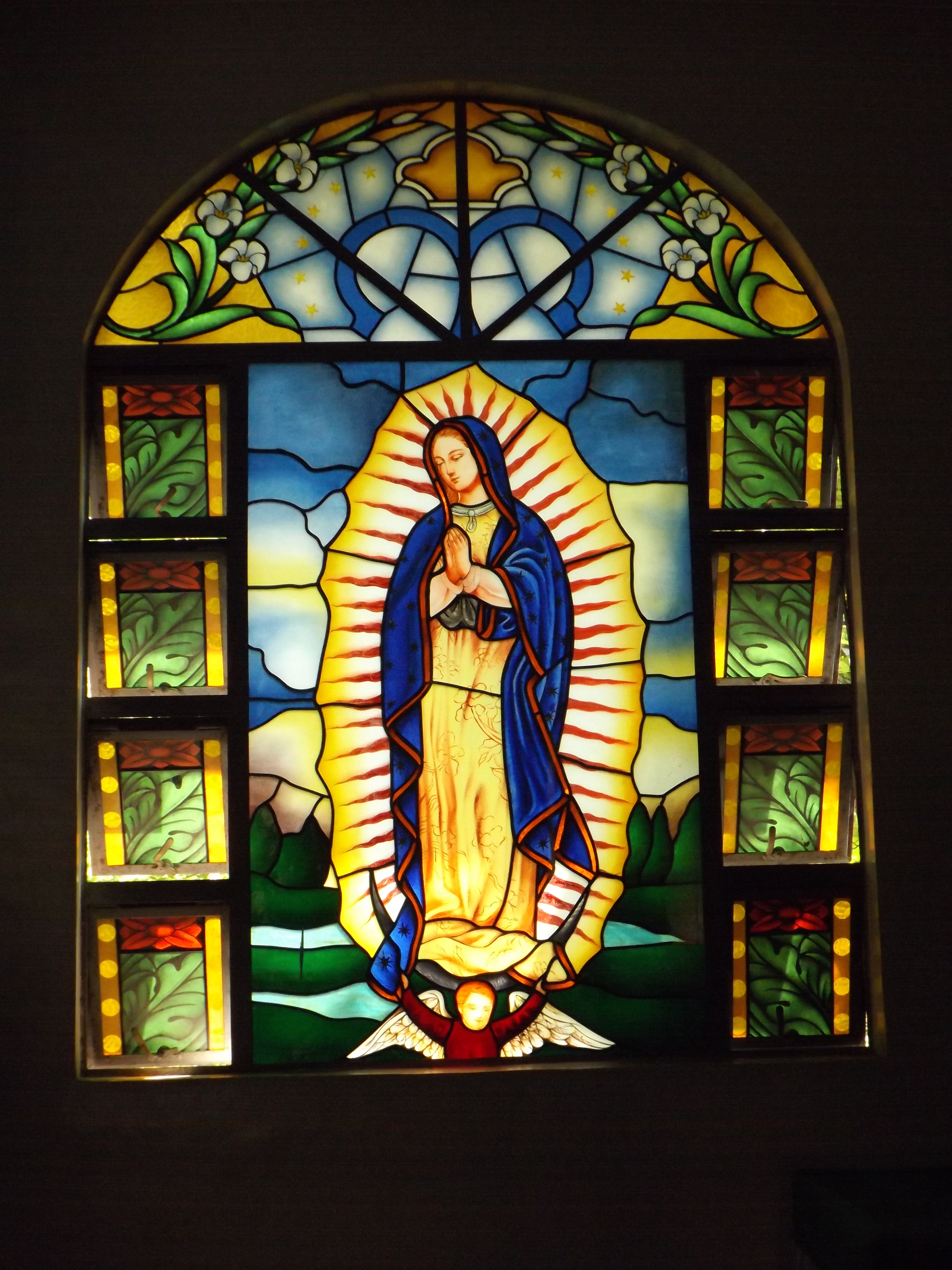
Stained glass at the altar (right)

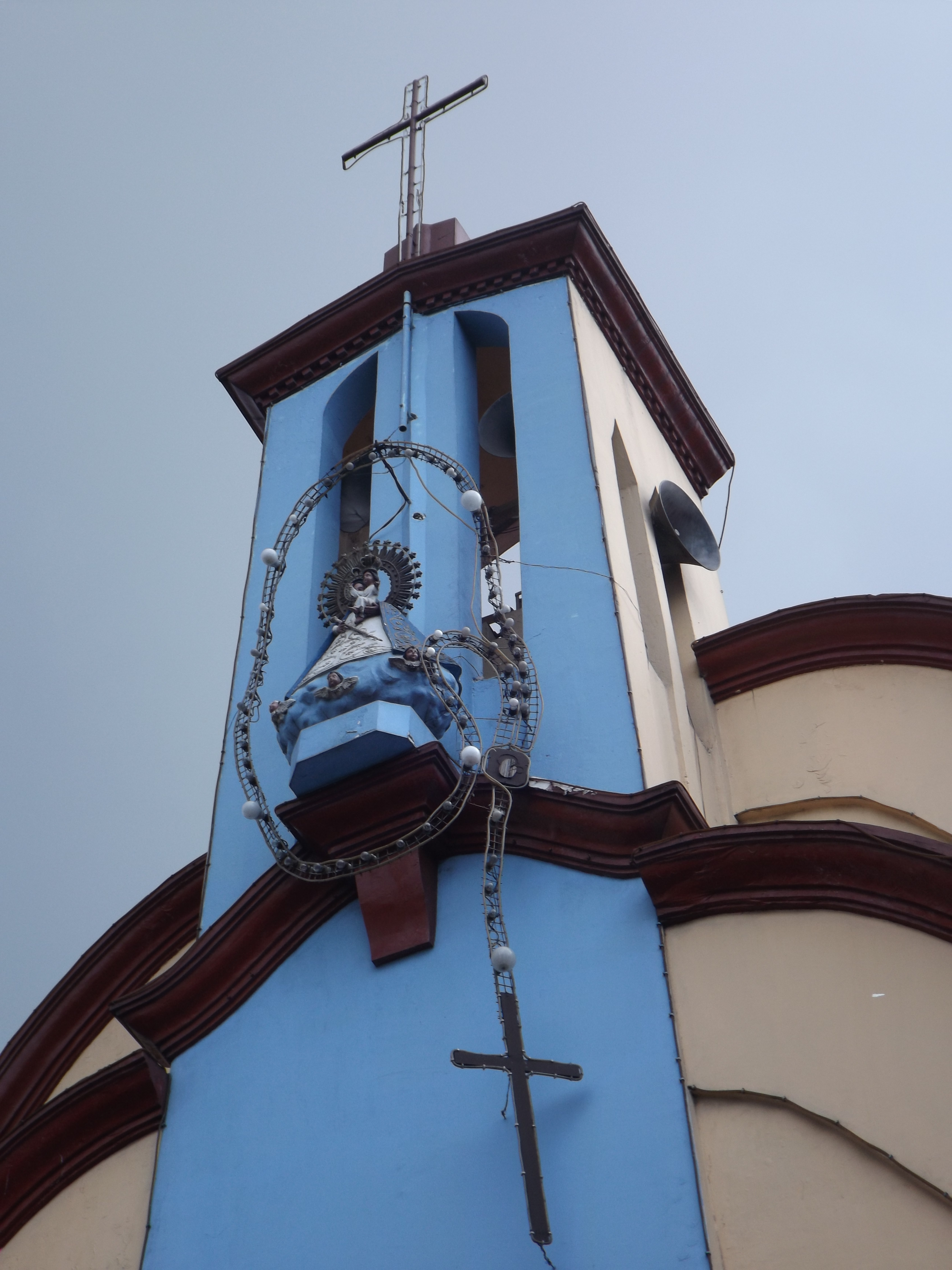
Our Lady of the Rosary (church facade)

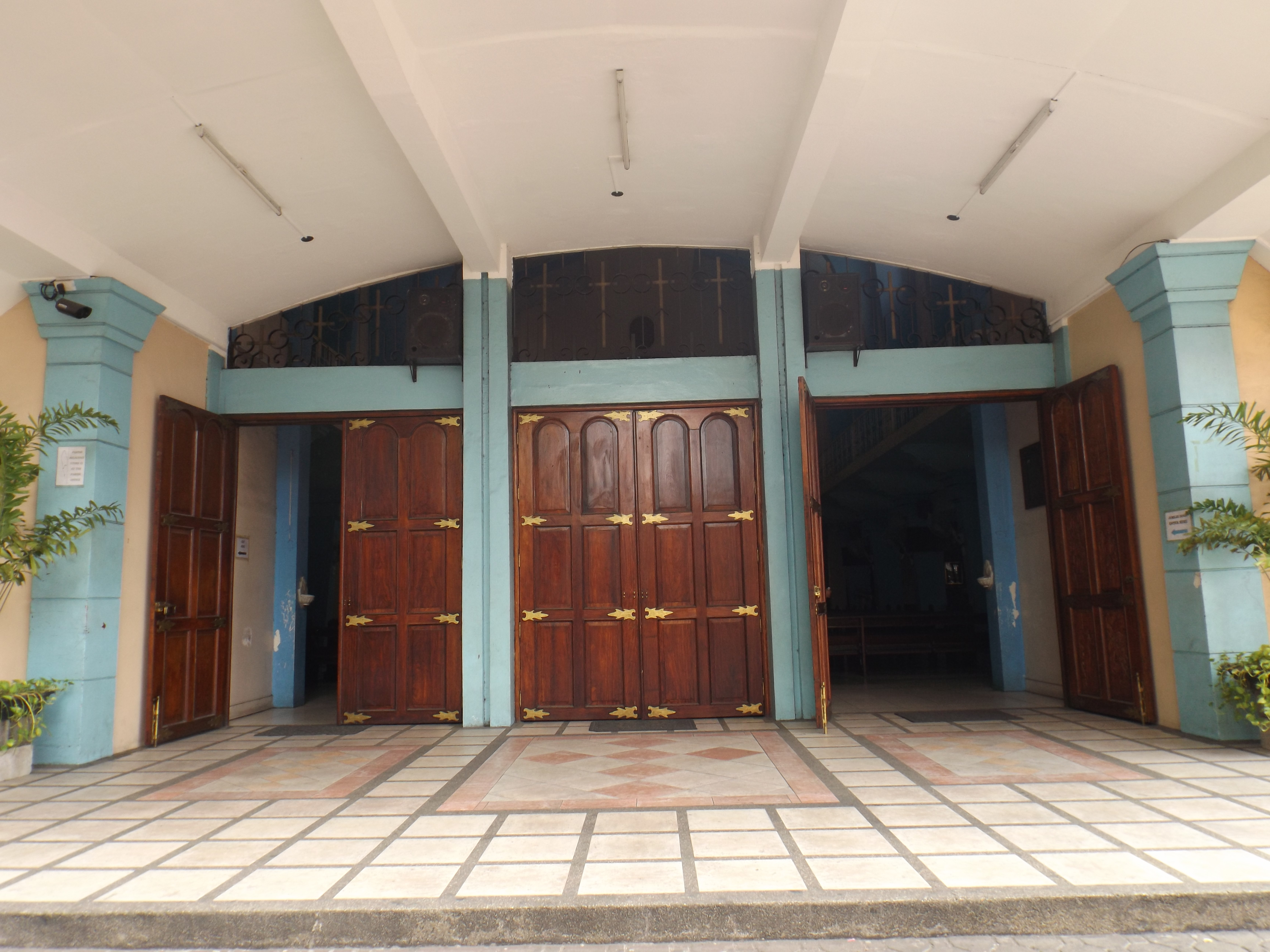
Jubilee door

== Pilgrim Church ==
Sto. Rosario de Pasig was declared a Pilgrim Church by Pope Francis in a papal decree dated April 17, 2013, to mark its 50th anniversary and to celebrate the Jubilee year which will end on October 7, 2014. The church's Jubilee Door is symbolic of the entrance of the pilgrims to the historic Jubilee Year. The other three Pilgrim Churches covered by the Pasig diocese are the Minor Basilica Parish of Saint Anne in Santa Ana, Taguig; Parish of Santo Tomas de Villanueva in Santolan, Pasig; and Our Lady of the Holy Rosary Parish in Lower Bicutan, Taguig.
