= Paz Cea de Conde =

Filipino politician

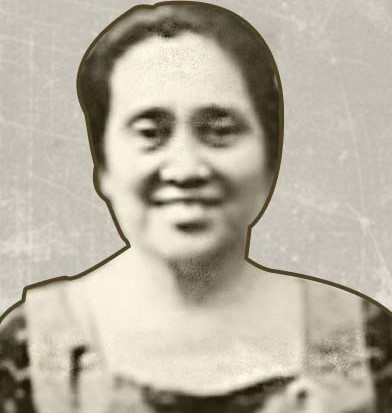

Governor of Camarines Sur
- In office 1937–1938
- Preceded by: Gerardo Fuentebella Cea
- Succeeded by: Mariano del Gallego

Member of the Camarines Sur Provincial Board

Personal details
- Born: Paz Cea y Fuentebella; January 21, 1888 Tigaon, Camarines Sur, Captaincy General of the Philippines
- Died: 1979 (aged 90–91)

Paz Cea de Conde (January 21, 1888 – 1979) was the first woman member of the provincial board of Camarines Sur, and the first woman governor of the Philippines. She served as governor in 1937–38 by succeeding her brother, Gerardo Fuentebella Cea.

Paz Cea de Conde was born in Tigaon, Camarines Sur, into a well-to-do family. Her mother, Dona Rufina Benitez Fuentebella, was from Sagnay, Camarines Sur, and Paz's uncle, Mariano Fuentebella, served as governor of Camarines Sur in 1914–1916. Paz was the daughter of Mayor Manuel Baduria Cea whose family had served the Municipality of Tigaon during the Spanish and American periods. Her parents owned almost half of the land in Tigaon at one time, and she inherited a 400-hectare hacienda as her share. As the daughter of a landed aristocratic family, she was sent to Manila for a college education. She completed her Bachelor of Arts degree (sobresaliente) at the Centro Escolar University in 1918.

Her brother, Don Severo Fuentebella Cea, was a former mayor, congressman and delegate of Camarines Sur to the 1934–35 constitutional convention. Another brother, Judge Sulpicio Vicente Fuentebella Cea, was a former congressman of Camarines Sur in 1916–1922, congressman of Albay in 1935–36, and first governor of Catanduanes.

Paz was the first cousin of Senator Jose Fuentebella and Camarines Sur Governor Felix Fuentebella, the father of Speaker of the Philippine House of Representatives Arnulfo Fuentebella. One of her nephews was Senator Edmundo B. Cea.
