= List of members of the House of Representatives of the Philippines (F) =

This is a complete list of past and present members of the House of Representatives of the Philippines whose last names begin with the letter F.

This list also includes members of the Philippine Assembly (1907–1916), the Commonwealth National Assembly (1935–1941), the Second Republic National Assembly (1943–1944) and the Batasang Pambansa (1978–1986).

== Fa ==
- Gabriel Fabella, member for Romblon (1935–1938)
- Fernando Faberes, member for Batanes (1984–1986)
- Erbie Fabian, member for Zamboanga City (2004–2007), and Zamboanga City's 2nd district (2007–2013)
- Ted Failon, member for Leyte's 1st district (2001–2004)
- Jacobo Fajardo, member for Pampanga's 2nd district (1909–1912)
- Mohammad Omar Fajardo, sectoral member (1995–1998)
- Pacifico Fajardo, member for Nueva Ecija's 3rd district (1992–2001)
- Jesnar Falcon, member for Surigao del Sur's 2nd district (1995–2004)
- Macario Falcon, member for Bohol's 2nd district (1934–1935)
- Peter Paul Jed Falcon, member for Surigao del Sur's 2nd district (2004–2007)
- Ria Christina Fariñas, member for Ilocos Norte's 1st district (2019–2022)
- Rodolfo Fariñas, member for Ilocos Norte's 1st district (1998–2001, 2010–2019)
- Rudys Caesar Fariñas, member for Probinsyano Ako party-list (2019–2025)
- Meynardo Farol, member for Batangas's 2nd district (1931–1934)
- Jose Fausto, member for Pampanga's 2nd district (19354–1938, 1945–1946)

== Fe ==
- Jose Fausto, member for Pampanga's 2nd district (1934–1938, 1945–1946)
- Jose Feliciano, member for Tarlac's 2nd district (1949–1953)
- Ramon Felipe, member for Camarines Sur's 1st district (1922–1928)
- Ramon Felipe Jr., member for Camarines Sur's 1st district (1965–1972)
- Lorenzo Fenoy, member for Pangasinan's 4th district (1907–1909)
- Felix Feria Jr., member for Negros Occidental's 3rd district (1965–1969)
- Marcelo Fernan Sr., member for Cebu City (1984–1986)
- Angel Fernandez, member for Pangasinan's 2nd district (1957–1965)
- Carlos Fernandez, member for Manila (1984–1986)
- Danilo Fernandez, member for Laguna's 1st district (2007–2016, 2019–2022), and Santa Rosa (2022–2025)
- Estanislao Fernandez Jr., member for Laguna's 2nd district (1946–1949, 1951–1953) and Region IV-A (1978–1984)
- Filemon Fernandez, member for Region VII (1978–1984)
- Jolly Fernandez, member for Masbate (1984–1986)
- Patricio Fernandez, member for Palawan (1922–1931, 1943–1944)
- Vicente Fernandez, member for Cagayan's 1st district (1916–1919)
- Bayani Fernando, member for Marikina's 1st district (2016–2022)
- Gavino Fernando, member for Manila's 4th district (1952–1953)
- Antonio Ferrer, member for Cavite's 6th district (2010–2013, 2022–present)
- Francisco Ferrer, member for Negros Occidental's 1st district (1949–1953)
- Inocencio Ferrer, member for Negros Occidental's 2nd district (1957–1965)
- Jaime Ferrer, member for Las Piñas–Parañaque (1984–1986)
- Jeffrey Ferrer, member for Negros Occidental's 4th district (2007–2016, 2025–present)
- Juliet Marie Ferrer, member for Negros Occidental's 4th district (2016–present)
- Luis Ferrer, member for Cavite (1943–1944)
- Luis Ferrer IV, member for Cavite's 6th district (2013–2022)
- Abigail Faye Ferriol-Pascual, member for Kalinga party-list (2010–2019)
- Leonardo Festin, member for Capiz's 3rd district (1916–1919), and Romblon (1919–1935, 1938–1941, 1943–1944, 1945–1949)

== Fi ==
- Alejandro Fider, member for Region IV (1978–1984)
- Catalino Figueroa, member for Samar's 2nd district (1992–1998, 2004–2007)
- Eduardo Firmalo, member for Romblon (2004–2007)

== Fl ==
- Antonio Floirendo Jr., member for Davao del Norte's 2nd district (1998–2007, 2016–2019)
- Melchor Flor, member for Ilocos Norte's 2nd district (1916–1919)
- Karen Flores-Garcia, member for Cebu's 3rd district (2025–present)
- Delfin Flores, member for La Union's 1st district (1939–1941)
- Florencio Flores Jr., member for Bukidnon's 2nd district (2010–2019)
- Jonathan Keith Flores, member for Bukidnon's 2nd district (2019–present)
- Pablo Floro, member for Region IV (1978–1984)

== Fo ==
- Leoncio Fonacier, member for Cagayan's 2nd district (1909–1912)
- Santiago Fonacier, member for Ilocos Norte's 1st district (1912–1916)
- Nestor Fongwan, member for Benguet (2019)
- Valerio Fontanilla, member for La Union's 2nd district (1916–1919)
- Modesto Formilleza, member for Romblon (1946–1949)
- Gregorio Formoso, member for Isabela (1943–1944)
- Vicente Formoso, member for Cagayan's 1st district (1925–1931)
- Jose A. Fornier, member for Antique (1965–1969)
- Tobias Fornier, member for Antique (1943–1944, 1949–1965)
- Wowo Fortes, member for Sorsogon's 2nd district (2022–present)
- Carlos Fortich, member for Region X (1978–1984)
- Carlos Fortich Sr., member for Bukidnon (1946)
- Cesar Fortich, member for Bukidnon (1949–1960, 1962–1965, 1969–1972)
- Manuel Fortich, member for Mindanao and Sulu (1934–1935), and Bukidnon (1935–1941, 1945–1946)
- Remedios Fortich, member for Bukidnon (1947–1949)
- Lawrence Fortun, member for Agusan del Norte's 1st district (2013–2022)
- Jocelyn Fortuno, member for Camarines Sur's 5th district (2019–2022)
- Salvio Fortuno, member for Camarines Sur's 4th district (1998–2001), and Camarines Sur's 5th district (2010–2019)

== Fr ==
- Augusto Francisco, member for Manila's 4th district (1953–1961)
- Luis Francisco, member for Batangas's 2nd district (1934–1935)
- Oscar Francisco, member for ARC party-list (2009–2010)
- Duke Frasco, member for Cebu's 5th district (2019–present)
- Jaime Fresnedi, member for Muntinlupa (2022–present)

== Fu ==
- Orlando Fua Sr., member for Siquijor (1987–1998, 2007–2013)
- Orlando Fua Jr, member for Siquijor (1998–2007)
- Arnulf Bryan Fuentebella, member for Camarines Sur's 4th district (2019–present)
- Arnulfo Fuentebella, member for Region V (1978–1984), Camarines Sur's 3rd district (1992–2001, 2004–2010), and Camarines Sur's 4th district (2010–2019)
- Felix Fuentebella, member for Camarines Sur's 2nd district (1953–1972)
- Felix William Fuentebella, member for Camarines Sur's 3rd district (2001–2004), and Camarines Sur's 4th district (2013–2016)
- José Fuentebella, member for Ambos Camarines's 3rd district (1909–1916), Camarines Sur's 2nd district (1935–1941, 1945–1946), and Camarines Sur (1943–1944)
- Manuel Fuentebella, member for Camarines Sur's 2nd district (1925–1931)
- Leonardo Fugoso, member for Manila's 3rd district (1987–1998)
