= Fuentebella =

Fuentebella is a surname. Notable people with the surname include:

- Arnulf Bryan Fuentebella (born 1976), Filipino politician
- Arnulfo Fuentebella (1945–2020), Filipino politician
- Evelyn Fuentebella (born 1945), Filipino politician
- Felix Fuentebella (1915–2000), Filipino politician
- Felix William Fuentebella (born 1975), Filipino politician
- José Fuentebella (1883–1982), Filipino politician
- Manuel Fuentebella (1889–1955), Filipino politician
- Mariano Fuentebella (died 1916), Filipino politician

== See also ==
- Fuentebella (village), a ghost town in Spain
