= Legislative districts of Ambos Camarines =

Legislative district of the Philippines

The legislative districts of Ambos Camarines were the representations of the historical province of Ambos Camarines in the various national legislatures of the Philippines until 1919.

The undivided province's representation encompassed what the present-day provinces of Camarines Norte and Camarines Sur, and the independent component city of Naga.

== History ==
Ambos Camarines was initially represented in the lower house of the Philippine Legislature through three assembly districts. When seats for the upper house of the Philippine Legislature were elected from territory-based districts between 1916 and 1935, the province (and its successor provinces of Camarines Norte and Camarines Sur) formed part of the sixth senatorial district which elected two out of the 24-member Senate.

On March 3, 1919, the Philippine Legislature approved Act No. 2809 which divided Ambos Camarines into two provinces: per Section 3 of the said law the province's northern municipalities were constituted into Camarines Norte, while the remaining territory of Ambos Camarines was renamed Camarines Sur. Pursuant to Sections 4 and 5 of Act No. 2809 Camarines Norte was provided one lower house representative, and Camarines Sur two representatives; both provinces elected their separate representatives starting in the November 1919 elections.

== 1st District (defunct) ==
Municipalities: Capalonga, Daet, Gainza, Indan, Labo, Libmanan, Lupi, Mambulao, Milaor, Minalabac, Pamplona, Paracale, Pasacao, Ragay, San Fernando, San Vicente, Sipocot, Basud (re-established 1908), Talisay (re-established 1908), Cabusao (established 1914)

| Period | Representative |
|---|---|
| 1st Philippine Legislature; 1907–1909 | Tomas N. Arejola |
| 2nd Philippine Legislature; 1909–1912 | Tomas N. Arejola |
| 3rd Philippine Legislature; 1912–1916 | Silverio D. Cecilio |
| 4th Philippine Legislature; 1916–1919 | Gonzalo S. Escalante |

== 2nd District (defunct) ==
- Municipalities: Baao, Bato, Bula, Calabanga, Iriga, Magarao, Nabua, Nueva Caceres (Naga), Pili, Camaligan (established 1909), Canaman (established 1909)

| Period | Representative |
|---|---|
| 1st Philippine Legislature; 1907–1909 | Rey Manuel |
| 2nd Philippine Legislature; 1909–1912 | Fulgencio Contreras |
| 3rd Philippine Legislature; 1912–1916 | Julian Ocampo |
| 4th Philippine Legislature; 1916–1919 | Rey Manuel |

== 3rd District (defunct) ==
- Municipalities: Buhi, Caramoan, Goa, Lagonoy, Sagñay, San Jose, Siruma, Tigaon, Tinambac

| Period | Representative |
|---|---|
| 1st Philippine Legislature; 1907–1909 | Francisco Alvarez |
| 2nd Philippine Legislature; 1909–1912 | Jose T. Fuentebella |
| 3rd Philippine Legislature; 1912–1916 | Jose T. Fuentebella |
| 4th Philippine Legislature; 1916–1919 | Sulpicio V. Cea |

== At-Large (defunct) ==
| Period | Representative |
|---|---|
| Malolos Congress; 1898–1899 | Justo Lucban |
| Malolos Congress; 1898–1899 | Tomas Arejola |
| Malolos Congress; 1898–1899 | Valeriano Velarde |
| Malolos Congress; 1898–1899 | Mariano Quien |

== See also ==
- Legislative district of Camarines Norte
- Legislative districts of Camarines Sur
