= Ambos Camarines's 3rd congressional district =

Legislative district of the Philippines

Ambos Camarines's 3rd congressional district is a defunct congressional district that encompassed the eastern portions of the former province of Ambos Camarines. It was represented in the Philippine Assembly from 1907 to 1916 and in the House of Representatives of the Philippine Islands from 1916 to 1919. The Spanish colonial province of Ambos Camarines was reorganized under the Insular Government of the Philippine Islands on April 27, 1901, and was divided into three districts. Francisco Álvarez was elected as this district's first representative in 1907. Following its repartition into Camarines Norte and Camarines Sur on March 3, 1919, the district was abolished with most of its territory having been absorbed by Camarines Sur's 2nd congressional district.

== Representation history ==
#	Image	Member	Term of office		Legislature	Party	Electoral history	Constituent LGUs
#	Image	Member	Start	End	Legislature	Party	Electoral history	Constituent LGUs
=== Ambos Camarines's 3rd district for the Philippine Assembly ===
District created January 9, 1907.
1		Francisco Álvarez	October 16, 1907	October 16, 1909	1st	Nacionalista	Elected in 1907.	1907–1916; Buhi, Caramoan, Goa, Lagonoy, Sagñay, San Jose, Siruma, Tigaon, Tinambac
2		José Fuentebella	October 16, 1909	October 16, 1916	2nd	Nacionalista	Elected in 1909.	1907–1916; Buhi, Caramoan, Goa, Lagonoy, Sagñay, San Jose, Siruma, Tigaon, Tinambac
2		José Fuentebella	October 16, 1909	October 16, 1916	3rd	Nacionalista	Re-elected in 1912.	1907–1916; Buhi, Caramoan, Goa, Lagonoy, Sagñay, San Jose, Siruma, Tigaon, Tinambac
=== Ambos Camarines's 3rd district for the House of Representatives of the Philippine Islands ===
3		Sulpicio Cea	October 16, 1916	June 3, 1919	4th	Nacionalista	Elected in 1916.	1916–1919; Buhi, Caramoan, Goa, Lagonoy, Sagñay, San Jose, Siruma, Tigaon, Tinambac
District dissolved into Camarines Sur's 2nd district.

== See also ==
- Legislative districts of Camarines Norte
- Legislative districts of Camarines Sur
