= Governor of Camarines Sur =

Local chief executive

- Gobernador ng Lalawigan ng Camarines Sur
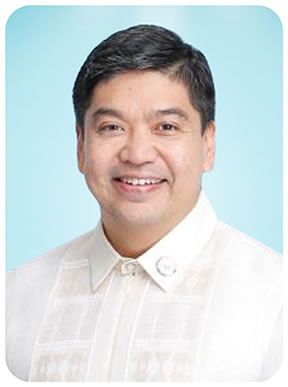
- Incumbent; Luis Raymund Villafuerte since June 30, 2025
- Style: The Honorable
- Seat: Camarines Sur Provincial Capitol, Pili, Camarines Sur
- Term length: 3 years, not eligible for re-election immediately after three consecutive terms
- Inaugural holder: George Curry (inaugural); Juan Pimentel (as first Filipino Governor)
- Formation: 1901
- Deputy: Vice Governor
- Website: https://www.camarinessur.gov.ph/

The Governor of Camarines Sur (Filipino: Punong Lalawigan ng Camarines Sur) is the chief executive of the Philippine province of Camarines Sur.

Previously located in Naga City, the seat of the Governor has been located in Pili, Camarines Sur since 1955, after the transfer of the provincial capital there due to the inauguration of Naga as an independent city.

== List of governors ==
#	Image	Name	Took office	Left office	Party
Governors of Ambos Camarines
1		George Curry	1901	1901	Republican
2		James Ross	1901	1903	Republican
3		Juan Pimentel	1903	1906	Federalista
4		Mariano Abella	1906	1909	Progresista
5		Mariano Perfecto	1910	1912	Progresista
6		Mariano Fuentebella	1912	1916	Nacionalista
7		Jose Fuentebella	1916	1916	Nacionalista
8		Manuel Crescini	1916	1918	Democrata
9		Andres Garchitorena	1919	1919	Democrata
Governors of Camarines Sur
10		Julian Ocampo	1919	1922	Nacionalista
11		Manuel Crescini	1922	1928	Democrata
12		Ramon B. Felipe	1928	1934	Democrata
13		Julian Ocampo	1934	1935	Nacionalista
14		Gerardo Cea	1935	1936	Nacionalista
15		Gabriel Prieto	1936	1937	Nacionalista
16		Paz Cea de Conde	1937	1938	Independent
17		Mariano del Gallego	1938	1941	Nacionalista
18		Ramon Imperial	1941	1941	Nacionalista
19		Manuel del Gallego	1941	1941	Nacionalista
20		Ignacio Meliton	1941	1941	Nacionalista
21		Mariano Villafuerte	1942	1943	Nacionalista
22		Mariano Garchitorena	1945	1946	Liberal
23		Gabriel Prieto	1946	1947	Nacionalista
24		Jose del Gallego	1947	1951	Liberal
25		Juan Triviño	1951	1959	Nacionalista
26		Apolonio Maleniza	1959	1967	Liberal
27		Armando Cledera	1967	1971	Nacionalista
28		Felix Alfelor	1971	1976	Liberal
29		Felix Fuentebella	1976	1986	KBL
30		Luis Villafuerte	1986	1992	Lakas
31		Jose Bulaong	1992	1995	Lakas
32		Luis Villafuerte	1995	2004	LDP
33		Luis Raymund Villafuerte	2004	2013	Nacionalista
34		Miguel Luis Villafuerte	2013	2022	Nacionalista
35		Vincenzo Renato Luigi Villafuerte	2022	2025	PDP–Laban
36		Luis Raymund Villafuerte	2025	Present	NUP
