= Camarines Sur's 2nd congressional district =

Legislative district of the Philippines

- Constituency for the House of Representatives of the Philippines
- Boundary of congressional district in city/province

- Location of Camarines Sur within the Philippines
- Province: Camarines Sur
- Region: Bicol Region
- Population: 343,942 (2020)
- Electorate: 217,470 (2022)
- Major settlements: 7 LGUs: Municipalities; Gainza; Libmanan; Milaor; Minalabac; Pamplona; Pasacao; San Fernando
- Area: 819.21 km^{2} (316.30 sq mi)

Current constituency
- Created: 1919
- Representative: Luigi Villafuerte
- Political party: NUP
- Congressional bloc: Majority

Camarines Sur's 2nd congressional district is one of the five congressional districts of the Philippines in the province of Camarines Sur. It has been represented in the House of Representatives of the Philippines since 1919. The district consists of the west central Camarines Sur municipalities of Gainza, Libmanan, Milaor, Minalabac, Pamplona, Pasacao and San Fernando. It is currently represented in the 20th Congress by Luigi Villafuerte of the National Unity Party (NUP).

== Representation history ==
#	Image	Member	Term of office		Legislature	Party	Electoral history	Constituent LGUs
#	Image	Member	Start	End	Legislature	Party	Electoral history	Constituent LGUs
=== Camarines Sur's 2nd district for the House of Representatives of the Philippine Islands ===
District created March 3, 1919.
1		Honesto P. Obias	June 3, 1919	June 6, 1922	5th	Demócrata	Elected in 1919.	1919–1935; Baao, Bato, Buhi, Bula, Caramoan, Goa, Iriga, Lagonoy, Nabua, Pili, Sagñay, San Jose, Siruma, Tigaon, Tinambac
2		Sulpicio V. Cea	June 6, 1922	June 2, 1925	6th	Demócrata	Elected in 1922.	1919–1935; Baao, Bato, Buhi, Bula, Caramoan, Goa, Iriga, Lagonoy, Nabua, Pili, Sagñay, San Jose, Siruma, Tigaon, Tinambac
3		Manuel Fuentebella	June 2, 1925	June 2, 1931	7th	Nacionalista; Consolidado	Elected in 1925.	1919–1935; Baao, Bato, Buhi, Bula, Caramoan, Goa, Iriga, Lagonoy, Nabua, Pili, Sagñay, San Jose, Siruma, Tigaon, Tinambac
3		Manuel Fuentebella	June 2, 1925	June 2, 1931	8th	Nacionalista; Consolidado	Re-elected in 1928.	1919–1935; Baao, Bato, Buhi, Bula, Caramoan, Goa, Iriga, Lagonoy, Nabua, Pili, Sagñay, San Jose, Siruma, Tigaon, Tinambac
4		Severo Cea	June 2, 1931	June 5, 1934	9th	Demócrata	Elected in 1931.	1919–1935; Baao, Bato, Buhi, Bula, Caramoan, Goa, Iriga, Lagonoy, Nabua, Pili, Sagñay, San Jose, Siruma, Tigaon, Tinambac
5		Luís N. de León	June 5, 1934	September 16, 1935	10th	Nacionalista; Democrático	Elected in 1934.	1919–1935; Baao, Bato, Buhi, Bula, Caramoan, Goa, Iriga, Lagonoy, Nabua, Pili, Sagñay, San Jose, Siruma, Tigaon, Tinambac
#	Image	Member	Term of office		National Assembly	Party	Electoral history	Constituent LGUs
#	Image	Member	Start	End	National Assembly	Party	Electoral history	Constituent LGUs
=== Camarines Sur's 2nd district for the National Assembly (Commonwealth of the Philippines) ===
(5)		Luís N. de León	September 16, 1935	May 25, 1937	1st	Nacionalista; Democrático	Re-elected in 1935. Election annulled by electoral commission after an electoral protest.	1935–1941; Baao, Bato, Buhi, Bula, Caramoan, Goa, Iriga, Lagonoy, Nabua, Pili, Sagñay, San Jose, Siruma, Tigaon, Tinambac
6		José Fuentebella	May 25, 1937	December 30, 1941	1st	Nacionalista; Demócrata Pro-Independencia	Declared winner of 1935 elections.	1935–1941; Baao, Bato, Buhi, Bula, Caramoan, Goa, Iriga, Lagonoy, Nabua, Pili, Sagñay, San Jose, Siruma, Tigaon, Tinambac
6		José Fuentebella	May 25, 1937	December 30, 1941	2nd	Nacionalista	Re-elected in 1938.	1935–1941; Baao, Bato, Buhi, Bula, Caramoan, Goa, Iriga, Lagonoy, Nabua, Pili, Sagñay, San Jose, Siruma, Tigaon, Tinambac
District dissolved into the two-seat Camarines Sur's at-large district for the National Assembly (Second Philippine Republic).
#	Image	Member	Term of office		Common wealth Congress	Party	Electoral history	Constituent LGUs
#	Image	Member	Start	End	Common wealth Congress	Party	Electoral history	Constituent LGUs
=== Camarines Sur's 2nd district for the House of Representatives of the Commonwealth of the Philippines ===
District re-created May 24, 1945.
(6)		José Fuentebella	June 11, 1945	May 25, 1946	1st	Nacionalista	Re-elected in 1941.	1945–1946; Baao, Bato, Buhi, Bula, Caramoan, Goa, Iriga, Lagonoy, Nabua, Pili, Sagñay, San Jose, Siruma, Tigaon, Tinambac
#	Image	Member	Term of office		Congress	Party	Electoral history	Constituent LGUs
#	Image	Member	Start	End	Congress	Party	Electoral history	Constituent LGUs
=== Camarines Sur's 2nd district for the House of Representatives of the Philippines ===
7		Sebastián C. Moll Jr.	May 25, 1946	December 30, 1949	1st	Liberal	Elected in 1946.	1946–1949; Baao, Bato, Buhi, Bula, Caramoan, Goa, Iriga, Lagonoy, Nabua, Pili, Sagñay, San Jose, Siruma, Tigaon, Tinambac
8		Edmundo B. Cea	December 30, 1949	December 30, 1953	2nd	Nacionalista	Elected in 1949.	1949–1953; Baao, Bato, Buhi, Bula, Caramoan, Garchitorena, Goa, Iriga, Lagonoy, Nabua, Ocampo, Pili, Sagñay, San Jose, Siruma, Tigaon, Tinambac
9		Félix Fuentebella	December 30, 1953	September 23, 1972	3rd	Nacionalista	Elected in 1953.	1953–1969; Baao, Balatan, Bato, Buhi, Bula, Caramoan, Garchitorena, Goa, Iriga, Lagonoy, Nabua, Ocampo, Pili, Sagñay, San Jose, Siruma, Tigaon, Tinambac
9		Félix Fuentebella	December 30, 1953	September 23, 1972	4th	Nacionalista	Re-elected in 1957.	1953–1969; Baao, Balatan, Bato, Buhi, Bula, Caramoan, Garchitorena, Goa, Iriga, Lagonoy, Nabua, Ocampo, Pili, Sagñay, San Jose, Siruma, Tigaon, Tinambac
9		Félix Fuentebella	December 30, 1953	September 23, 1972	5th	Nacionalista	Re-elected in 1961.	1953–1969; Baao, Balatan, Bato, Buhi, Bula, Caramoan, Garchitorena, Goa, Iriga, Lagonoy, Nabua, Ocampo, Pili, Sagñay, San Jose, Siruma, Tigaon, Tinambac
9		Félix Fuentebella	December 30, 1953	September 23, 1972	6th	Nacionalista	Re-elected in 1965.	1953–1969; Baao, Balatan, Bato, Buhi, Bula, Caramoan, Garchitorena, Goa, Iriga, Lagonoy, Nabua, Ocampo, Pili, Sagñay, San Jose, Siruma, Tigaon, Tinambac
9		Félix Fuentebella	December 30, 1953	September 23, 1972	7th	Nacionalista	Re-elected in 1969. Removed from office after imposition of martial law.	1969–1972; Baao, Balatan, Bato, Buhi, Bula, Caramoan, Garchitorena, Goa, Iriga, Lagonoy, Nabua, Ocampo, Pili, Presentacion, Sagñay, San Jose, Siruma, Tigaon, Tinambac
District dissolved into the twelve-seat Region V's at-large district for the Interim Batasang Pambansa, followed by the four-seat Camarines Sur's at-large district for the Regular Batasang Pambansa.
District re-created February 2, 1987.
10		Raul Roco	June 30, 1987	June 30, 1992	8th	UNIDO	Elected in 1987.	1987–2010; Bombon, Calabanga, Camaligan, Canaman, Gainza, Magarao, Milaor, Naga, Ocampo, Pili
10		Raul Roco	June 30, 1987	June 30, 1992	8th	LDP	Elected in 1987.	1987–2010; Bombon, Calabanga, Camaligan, Canaman, Gainza, Magarao, Milaor, Naga, Ocampo, Pili
11		Celso O. Baguio	June 30, 1992	June 30, 1995	9th	PMP	Elected in 1992.	1987–2010; Bombon, Calabanga, Camaligan, Canaman, Gainza, Magarao, Milaor, Naga, Ocampo, Pili
12		Leopoldo E. San Buenaventura	June 30, 1995	June 30, 1998	10th	PRP	Elected in 1995.	1987–2010; Bombon, Calabanga, Camaligan, Canaman, Gainza, Magarao, Milaor, Naga, Ocampo, Pili
13		Jaime D. Jacob	June 30, 1998	June 30, 2001	11th	Aksyon	Elected in 1998.	1987–2010; Bombon, Calabanga, Camaligan, Canaman, Gainza, Magarao, Milaor, Naga, Ocampo, Pili
14		Sulpicio S. Roco	June 30, 2001	June 30, 2004	12th	Aksyon	Elected in 2001.	1987–2010; Bombon, Calabanga, Camaligan, Canaman, Gainza, Magarao, Milaor, Naga, Ocampo, Pili
15		Luis Villafuerte	June 30, 2004	June 30, 2010	13th	KAMPI	Elected in 2004.	1987–2010; Bombon, Calabanga, Camaligan, Canaman, Gainza, Magarao, Milaor, Naga, Ocampo, Pili
15		Luis Villafuerte	June 30, 2004	June 30, 2010	14th	NPC	Re-elected in 2007. Redistricted to the 3rd district.	1987–2010; Bombon, Calabanga, Camaligan, Canaman, Gainza, Magarao, Milaor, Naga, Ocampo, Pili
16		Diosdado Macapagal Arroyo	June 30, 2010	June 30, 2016	15th	Lakas	Redistricted from the 1st district and re-elected in 2010.	2010–present Gainza, Libmanan, Milaor, Minalabac, Pamplona, Pasacao, San Fernando
16		Diosdado Macapagal Arroyo	June 30, 2010	June 30, 2016	16th	Lakas	Re-elected in 2013.	2010–present Gainza, Libmanan, Milaor, Minalabac, Pamplona, Pasacao, San Fernando
17		Luis Raymund Villafuerte	June 30, 2016	June 30, 2025	17th	Nacionalista	Elected in 2016.	2010–present Gainza, Libmanan, Milaor, Minalabac, Pamplona, Pasacao, San Fernando
17		Luis Raymund Villafuerte	June 30, 2016	June 30, 2025	18th	Nacionalista	Re-elected in 2019.	2010–present Gainza, Libmanan, Milaor, Minalabac, Pamplona, Pasacao, San Fernando
17		Luis Raymund Villafuerte	June 30, 2016	June 30, 2025	19th	NUP	Re-elected in 2022.	2010–present Gainza, Libmanan, Milaor, Minalabac, Pamplona, Pasacao, San Fernando
18		Vincenzo Renato Luigi Villafuerte	June 30, 2025	Incumbent	20th	NUP	Elected in 2025.	2010–present Gainza, Libmanan, Milaor, Minalabac, Pamplona, Pasacao, San Fernando

== Election results ==
=== 2025 ===
Candidate	Party	Votes	%
Luigi Villafuerte	National Unity Party	107,445	63.72
Fermin Mabulo	Nationalist People's Coalition	61,169	36.28
Total		168,614	100.00
Valid votes		168,614	91.17
Invalid/blank votes		16,330	8.83
Total votes		184,944	100.00
Registered voters/turnout		222,775	83.02
National Unity Party hold			
Source: Commission on Elections

=== 2022 ===
2022 Philippine House of Representatives elections
Party	Candidate	Votes	%
NUP	Luis Raymund Villafuerte	111,743	78.65
Lakas	Ronnie Abasola	30,325	21.35
Total votes		142,068	100.00
NUP hold			

=== 2019 ===
2019 Philippine House of Representatives elections
Party	Candidate	Votes	%
Nacionalista	Luis Raymund Villafuerte	80,029	51.09
NPC	Maribel Andaya	76,615	48.91
Total votes		156,644	100
Nacionalista hold			

=== 2016 ===
2016 Philippine House of Representatives elections
Party	Candidate	Votes	%
Nacionalista	Luis Raymund Villafuerte	88,693	59.62
NPC	Asuncion Arceño	37,029	25.46
Invalid or blank votes		21,699	14.92
Total votes		147,421	100.00
Nacionalista gain from Lakas			

=== 2013 ===
2013 Philippine House of Representatives elections
Party	Candidate	Votes	%
Lakas	Dato Arroyo	57,106	47.85
Nacionalista	Luis Raymund Villafuerte	49,436	41.43
Liberal	Sabas Mabulo	6,380	5.35
Margin of victory		7,670	6.43%
Invalid or blank votes		6,415	5.38
Total votes		119,337	100.00
Lakas hold			

=== 2010 ===
2010 Philippine House of Representatives elections
Party	Candidate	Votes	%
Lakas–Kampi	Dato Arroyo	78,562	66.09
Nacionalista	Fermin Mabulo	32,489	27.33
Valid ballots		111,051	93.42
Invalid or blank votes		7,820	6.58
Total votes		118,871	100.00
Lakas–Kampi gain from NPC			

== See also ==
- Legislative districts of Camarines Sur
