= Felix Fuentebella =

Filipino politician

The Honorable Felix Abad Fuentebella
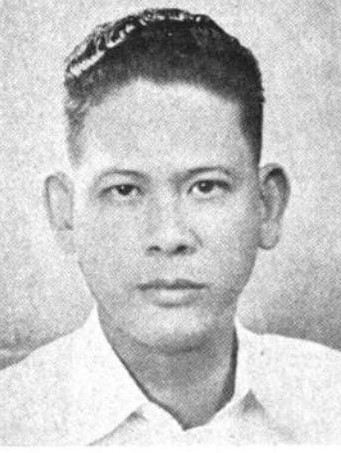

Member of the Philippine House of Representatives from Camarines Sur's 2nd District
- In office December 30, 1953 – September 23, 1972
- Preceded by: Edmundo B. Cea
- Succeeded by: post later held by Raul S. Roco

Governor of Camarines Sur
- In office January 1, 1976 – March 25, 1986
- Preceded by: Felix Alfelor
- Succeeded by: Luis R. Villafuerte

Personal details
- Born: Felix Abad Fuentebella; September 5, 1915 Nueva Cáceres, Ambos Camarines, Philippine Islands
- Died: May 29, 2000 (aged 84) Tigaon, Camarines Sur, Philippines
- Party: KBL (1978-1986); Nacionalista (1953-1972)
- Spouse: Rita Palma
- Children: 4, including Arnulfo
- Education: University of the Philippines
- Profession: Lawyer

Felix Abad Fuentebella (September 5, 1915 – May 29, 2000) was a Filipino politician. He was the Representative of the 2nd District of Camarines Sur in the Philippines from 1954 to 1972 and the Provincial Governor of Camarines Sur from 1976 until 1986. He is the son of former Ambos Camarines Governor Mariano Fuentebella and the half brother of Jose Fuentebella and Manuel Fuentebella.

== Early life and education ==
Felix Fuentebella was born on September 5, 1915, in Nueva Cáceres, Ambos Camarines to former Gobernadorcillo and Governor of Ambos Camarines Mariano Fuentebella and Marta Abad.

He was educated in his home province and entered college in the University of the Philippines in 1937 and 1939 and graduated as a Civil Engineer and Mining Engineer. He worked as a civil engineer in the Bureau of Public Works in Camarines Norte and Camarines Sur, and then became a laboratory technician on construction and testing materials before he ran for Congress.

== Political career ==
Felix ran as a congressman of the Second District of Camarines Sur in 1953 after his nephew and Representative Edmundo B. Cea ran in the Senate where he won. He went undefeated in his reelection bids in Congress until 1972 when Martial Law was imposed by then President Ferdinand E. Marcos.

To serve the people despite the shut down of Congress after the declaration of Martial Law, he ran for provincial governor of Camarines Sur in 1976 and won serving the province for 10 years until EDSA I People Power Revolution took over on 1986 ousting President Ferdinand Marcos.

After the EDSA I People Power Revolution and being known as a Marcos supporter, Felix never ran for any elective position in the province.

== Death ==
Felix died on May 29, 2000 in Tigaon, Camarines Sur.

== Accomplishments as legislator and governor ==
Fuentebella's accomplishments included:

- Instrumental in the construction of Tandaay-San Juan-Libon Road; Nabua-Baao Diversion Road; Nabua-Balatan Road; Hanawan-San Ramon-Sagrada-San Isidro-Iriga Road; Agdangan-Caranday-San Vicente-Lidong Road; Goa-Tinambac-Tamban Road; Tinambac-Siruma Road; Bula-Palson-Tupas-Sto. Domingo Road; Sta. Cruz-Masoli-Bato Road; Bula-La Victoria-Itangon Road; Alberto Highway; parts of Lagonoy-Presentacion-Garchitorena-Caramoan Road; and sections of the Quirino Highway.
- Responsible for the concreting of: Anayan-Tigaon Road; Naga-Camaligan Provincial Road; Calabanga-Tinambac Road; and San Jose-Sabang Road.
- Helped set up Tigaon Waterworks System, Sagñay Water System and the Tamban Water System, among the water systems in Camarines Sur.
- Established Bongalon Port and Balatan Port.
- Helped establish St. Paul and St. Andrew Academies.
- Implemented Bicol River Basin Development Program.
- Authored the law converting Iriga into a charter city.
- Made Pili provincial capital and helped construct capitol.
- Helped bring Pilipinas Broadcasting Network to Bicol.
- Authored the law creating Presentacion municipality.
- Brought Alay Kapwa Surgical Mission by the University of Santo Tomas surgeons to Camarines Sur.
- Was a catalyst in launching Operation Smile, now a worldwide movement of medical practitioners to help children with cleft palates and facial deformities.

Political offices
Preceded by Felix Alfelor	Governor of Camarines Sur; 1976–1986	Succeeded by Luis Villafuerte
House of Representatives of the Philippines
Preceded by Edmundo B. Cea	Member of the House of Representatives from Camarines Sur's 2nd district 1953–1972	Succeeded by Raul Roco
