= Domingo M. Guevarra =

Filipino businessman (1909–2000)

- Born: Domingo Mariano Guevarra; January 2, 1909; Iriga, Ambos Camarines, Philippine Islands
- Died: 2000 (aged 90–91)
- Occupation: Businessman
- Spouse: Carmen San Buenaventura
- Children: 8

Domingo Mariano Guevarra Sr. (January 2, 1909 – 2000) was a Filipino businessman best known for introducing the radio brand Radiowealth in the Philippines as well as introducing the Filipino designed vehicle, the Volkswagen Sakbayan in the late-1960s.

== Early life ==
Domingo Mariano Guevarra was born on January 2, 1909 in Iriga, Ambos Camarines (later Camarines Sur). However, he grew up in the town of Pili. He finished his high school studies at the Camarines Sur School of Arts and Trades in Naga.

== Career ==
Guevarra established a radio repair shop in San Juan in Rizal (now part of Metro Manila) in 1930 which operated under Radiowealth, Inc. His business would grow and sell radios, stereos, and television set under the Radiowealth brand.

Guevarra was part of the Philippine Constitutional Convention of 1971. He sought programs regarding industrialization. Guevarra established the Diesel Motors Germany (DMG), Inc. in 1955. He also wrote Volkswagen, to be able to earn the rights to sell the German-brand vehicle in the Philippines. An automobile plant was set up in Libertad in Mandaluyong. In the late 1960s DMG built the Sakbayan, described as the first vehicle designed and made in the Philippines.

When President Ferdinand Marcos declared martial law in 1972, Guevarra faced pressure from the government with cronies of Marcos wanting to acquire his assets. With health issues also affecting him, Guevarra and his wife went into exile in the United States.

Guevarra acquired the franchise for the American car rental business Avis in 1972. He entrusted Leo Herrera to manage the Avis franchise in the Philippines.

== Personal life and legacy ==
Guevarra was known by the moniker Ingoy in the business industry. Nick Joaquin wrote a biography of him, The D.M. Guevara Story. He married Carmen San Buenaventura, who hails from Naga. They had eight children. He died sometime around 2000. The Mandaluyong city government later honored him by renaming Libertad Street "Domingo M. Guevara Street".
