= Edmundo B. Cea =

Filipino lawyer and politician (1911-1993)

The Honorable Edmundo B. Cea
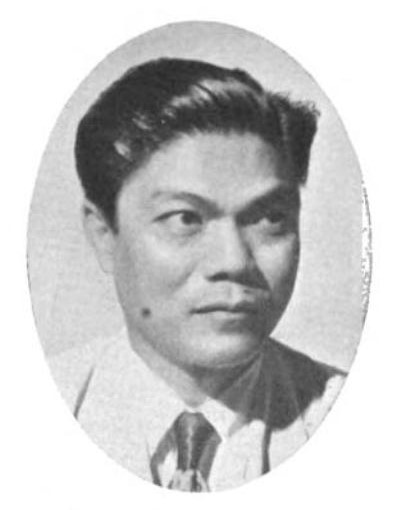
- Cea official portrait during the 2nd Congress.

Senator of the Philippines
- In office December 30, 1953 – December 30, 1959

Member of the Philippine House of Representatives from Camarines Sur's 2nd District
- In office December 30, 1949 – December 30, 1953
- Preceded by: Sebastian Moll, Jr.
- Succeeded by: Felix Fuentebella

Mambabatas Pambansa (Assemblyman) from Camarines Sur
- In office June 30, 1984 – March 25, 1986 Serving with Ciriaco Alfelor, Rolando Andaya and Luis Villafuerte Sr.

Personal details
- Born: Edmundo Bombase Cea; June 10, 1911 Tigaon, Ambos Camarines, Philippine Islands
- Died: December 30, 1993 (aged 82)
- Party: Nacionalista (1949-1993)
- Other political affiliations: UNIDO (1980-1988)
- Education: University of Santo Tomas

Edmundo Bombase Cea (June 10, 1911 – December 30, 1993) was a Filipino lawyer and politician.

== Early life and career ==
Cea was born in Tigaon on June 10, 1911 to Angela Bombase and Severo Fuentebella Cea. He was educated at University of Santo Tomas obtaining the degrees of Bachelor of Philosophy and Letters and Bachelor of Laws. He was a bar topnotcher in the bar examination of 1935. In college, he was Grand Alpha of the Alpha Tau fraternity and also served as the president of the student council. He was a World War II hero and considered as most outstanding fiscal of the country by obtaining 100 percent conviction in all cases prosecuted by him. He was the proponent of the Bank Secrecy Law, and the founder of Bicol Radio, the first radio station in the Bicol Region. He was also the founding president of a sugar milling company in the region.

== Political career ==
In 1949, he ran for congressman to challenge the incumbent Sebastian Moll Jr. who defeated his uncle Jose Tria Fuentebella, the first cousin of his father and he was elected to represent the Partido. He served as Senator of the Philippines from 1953 to 1959. He was a delegate of Partido in the 1971-72 constitutional convention where he was elected as majority floor leader. He was a member of the 1984-86 Batasang Pambansa and a member of the opposition bloc Apat Na Agila (transl. Four Eagles, referring to the four congressmen from Camarines Sur: Cea, Luis Villafuerte, Rolando Andaya and Ciriaco Alfelor). He was also the first dean of the College of Law at the University of Nueva Caceres. Cea was considered as a brilliant legislator of his time. He started his political career in the Nacionalista Party and died as chairman of the Nacionalista Party in the Bicol Region.

House of Representatives of the Philippines
Preceded by Sebastian Moll Jr.	Member of the House of Representatives from Camarines Sur's 2nd district 1949–1953	Succeeded by Felix Fuentebella
