= Mariano Fuentebella =

Mariano B. Fuentebella
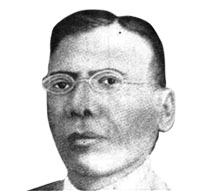

5th Governor of Camarines Sur
- In office 1912–1916
- Preceded by: Mariano Perfecto
- Succeeded by: Jose T. Fuentebella

Gobernadorcillo of Sagñay, Ambos Camarines

Personal details
- Born: Mariano Fuentebella y Benítez; 1851 Sagñay, Ambos Camarines, Captaincy General of the Philippines
- Died: May 1916 (aged 64–65) Sagñay, Ambos Camarines, Philippine Islands
- Party: Nacionalista
- Spouse(s): Perpetua Tria; Marta Abad
- Children: Jose T. Fuentebella; Manuel T. Fuentebella; Asuncion Fuentebella; Encarnacion Fuentebella; Anuncacion Fuentebella; Eduvigis Fuentebella; Felix A. Fuentebella; Eulalia Fuentebella

Don Mariano Benítez Fuentebella (1851 – May 1916) was the Governor of Ambos Camarines from 1912 to 1916. He is considered as the "Patriarch" of the Fuentebella family clan of Camarines Sur.

== Early life and education ==
Mariano Fuentebella was born and educated in his home town in Sagñay, Ambos Camarines into a prominent family. He married Perpetua Tria, the mother of his sons Jose and Manuel. But after Perpetua died, Mariano married Marta Abad who gave him another family politician, Felix. He is the grandfather of Arnulfo Fuentebella.

== Political and professional career ==
In the year 1912, Mariano's son Jose persuaded him to run for Governor of Ambos Camarines. He won the elections. Together with Jose, they planned and discussed financial needs and benefits for the province.

During his term as governor, he proposed and helped to obtain funding for the Naga-Lagonoy Road which is now a well-traversed artery in the Camarines Sur network today.

== Death ==
When he still serves as the Governor of Ambos Camarines, he suffered from heart attack which caused to his death in 1916. With his early death, his son Jose assumed the post as governor.
