= Severo Cea =

Filipino politician

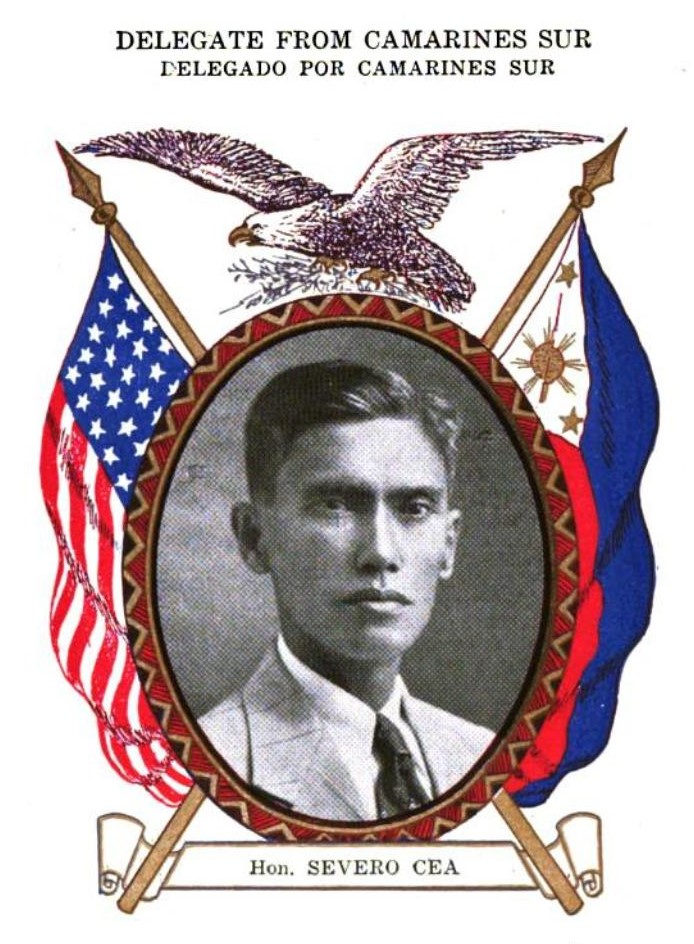
Cea as a delegate to the Philippine Constitutional Convention, published by Benipayo Press (c. 1935)

Severo Cea y Fuentebella (fl. 1913–1935) was a Filipino politician who was Municipal President of Tigaon in 1913, a congressman from 1931 to 1934 and a member of the 1934 Constitutional Convention.
