= Luis Villafuerte =

Filipino politician (1935–2021)

Luis R. Villafuerte, Sr.
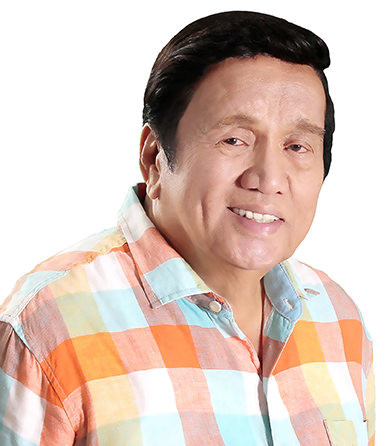

Member of the Philippine House of Representatives from Camarines Sur
- In office June 30, 2010 – June 30, 2013
- Preceded by: Arnulfo Fuentebella
- Succeeded by: Leni Robredo
- Constituency: 3rd District
- In office June 30, 2004 – June 30, 2010
- Preceded by: Sulpicio S. Roco
- Succeeded by: Dato Arroyo
- Constituency: 2nd District

Governor of Camarines Sur
- In office June 30, 1995 – June 30, 2004
- Vice Governor: Salvio Fortuno (1995–1998); Imelda Papin (1998–2004)
- Preceded by: Jose Bulaong
- Succeeded by: Luis Raymund Villafuerte
- In office March 26, 1986 – June 30, 1992
- Vice Governor: Julian Cea Napal (1986–1988); Jose Bulaong (1988–1992)
- Preceded by: Felix Fuentebella
- Succeeded by: Jose Bulaong

Minister of Trade
- In office 1979–1981
- Preceded by: Roberto Ongpin
- Succeeded by: Post dissolved (Ministry of Trade merged with Ministry of Industry)

Mambabatas Pambansa (Assemblyman) from Camarines Sur
- In office June 30, 1984 – March 25, 1986

Mambabatas Pambansa (Assemblyman) from Region V
- In office June 12, 1978 – June 5, 1984

Personal details
- Born: Luis Robredo Villafuerte; August 29, 1935 Philippines
- Died: September 8, 2021 (aged 86) Taguig, Philippines
- Resting place: Manila Memorial Park – Sucat, Paranaque, Philippines
- Party: Nacionalista (2018–2021)
- Other political affiliations: NPC (2007–2018); KAMPI (2006–2007); Lakas–NUCD (2003–2006); LDP (1988–2003); UNIDO (1984–1988); KBL (1978–1984)
- Spouse: Nelly Favis-Villafuerte
- Children: 6, including Luis Raymund
- Education: University of the Philippines Diliman (LL.B)
- Occupation: Public servant
- Profession: Lawyer

Luis Robredo Villafuerte Sr. (August 29, 1935 – September 8, 2021), often referred to by his initials LRV, was a Filipino politician, lawyer and businessman who served as Governor of Camarines Sur for 15 years and as a member of the House of Representatives from 2004 to 2013. He represented Camarines Sur's 2nd district from 2004 to 2010, and the 3rd district from 2010 to 2013.

In the late 1970s, Villafuerte assisted publisher Eugenia Apostol in establishing the magazine Mr. & Ms., with him providing funds and becoming chairman of the Mr. & Ms. Publishing Company.

== Early life and education ==
Villafuerte was the son of Mariano E. Villafuerte Sr., a lawyer who became a member of the National Assembly of the Philippines during the Commonwealth era and Governor of Camarines Sur during the Japanese occupation. During the liberation of Naga in May 1942, his father and his pregnant mother, Soledad Robredo Villafuerte, were on their way to Legazpi, Albay when were killed by members of the Tangcong Vaca Guerrilla Unit (TVGU) in Barrio Vito, Siruma in Camarines Sur for allegedly collaborating with the Japanese during World War II. His elder brother, Mariano ("Titoy"; born 1929), later became vice mayor of Naga City.

Villafuerte graduated from the University of the Philippines College of Law with a degree in law and was a member of the Sigma Rho fraternity.

== Business career ==
He subsequently worked in the private sector as a lawyer, businessman and investment banker based in the United States before becoming Senior Executive Vice President of the Bancom Development Corporation from 1965 to 1974.

In 1977, Villafuerte assisted publisher Eugenia Apostol, her husband Jose, and the couple of Cristina and Juan Ponce Enrile in restructuring their Ex Libris Publishing Company to establish the women's magazine Mr. & Ms. alongside textile businessman Ramon Siy; his assistance came after the company ran out of funds some time after its March 1976 founding, with Villafuerte investing additional funds and later becoming chairman of the Mr. & Ms. Publishing Company, Inc. He remained a stockholder at the publishing company until 1989.

== Political career ==
=== Marcos regime ===
Villafuerte was an assemblyman in the Batasang Pambansa from 1978 to 1986. He also served as the Minister of Trade in the cabinet of President Ferdinand Marcos from 1979 to 1981.

Villafuerte later broke with Marcos by leaving the Kilusang Bagong Lipunan in February 1984 and joined the opposition UNIDO party in Camarines Sur, with the provincial chapter then headed by former senator Edmundo B. Cea. Villafuerte then ran for a Batasan seat under UNIDO in the 1984 parliamentary election. While campaigning for him during the election, his sister-in-law Rosita Villafuerte, who was also the vice mayor of Sipocot, Camarines Sur, was assassinated on April 10 after finishing her speech at a midnight rally.

=== Post-EDSA Revolution ===
After President Marcos was overthrown in the People Power Revolution (or the EDSA Revolution) in February 1986, Villafuerte was appointed both the Secretary of Government Reorganization and OIC Governor of Camarines Sur by President Corazon Aquino. In the same year, he contributed a chapter on the economic issues facing the Aquino administration for the book The Aquino Alternative, published by the Institute of Southeast Asian Studies.

In 1988, Villafuerte managed to be elected governor of Camarines Sur despite his opponent Felix Alfelor Jr. being endorsed by numerous politicians such as his ally Edmundo Cea, congressman Raul Roco, and three former governors. Villafuerte was later convinced by Ramon Mitra Jr. to join the Laban ng Demokratikong Pilipino (LDP). He lost reelection in 1992 to his vice governor, Jose Bulaong. He defeated Bulaong and singer Imelda Papin in 1995 and was reelected in 1998. He defeated singer and actress Nora Aunor to win his third and final term as governor, ending in 2004. At the same time, Villafuerte was the first president of the League of Provinces of the Philippines from 1988 to 1990 and from 1998 to 2004. During his tenure, Villafuerte was accused of involvement in the Fertilizer Fund scam, but was acquitted in 2018. He expressed support for the potential presidential run of businessman Danding Cojuangco in the 2004 presidential election. In November 2003, Villafuerte became a member of the Lakas–NUCD alongside two other Bicol governors, aligning with the Arroyo administration.

In 2004, he was elected to the House of Representatives representing Camarines Sur and served until 2013. As a legislator, Villafuerte authored 67 bills and laws, including Republic Act 10157, which mandated compulsory kindergarten education. He also supported proposals to split parts of Camarines Sur into a separate province to be called Nueva Camarines, which resulted in a feud with his son and successor as governor, Luis Raymund Villafuerte.

In 2013, he ran again for governor but lost to his grandson Miguel Luis Villafuerte, which occurred during a falling-out between the two in which the latter was supported by his father, Luis Raymund. The three reconciled in 2018.

== Personal life and death ==
Villafuerte was married to Nelly Favis and had six children, including Luis Raymund Villafuerte, who also entered politics.

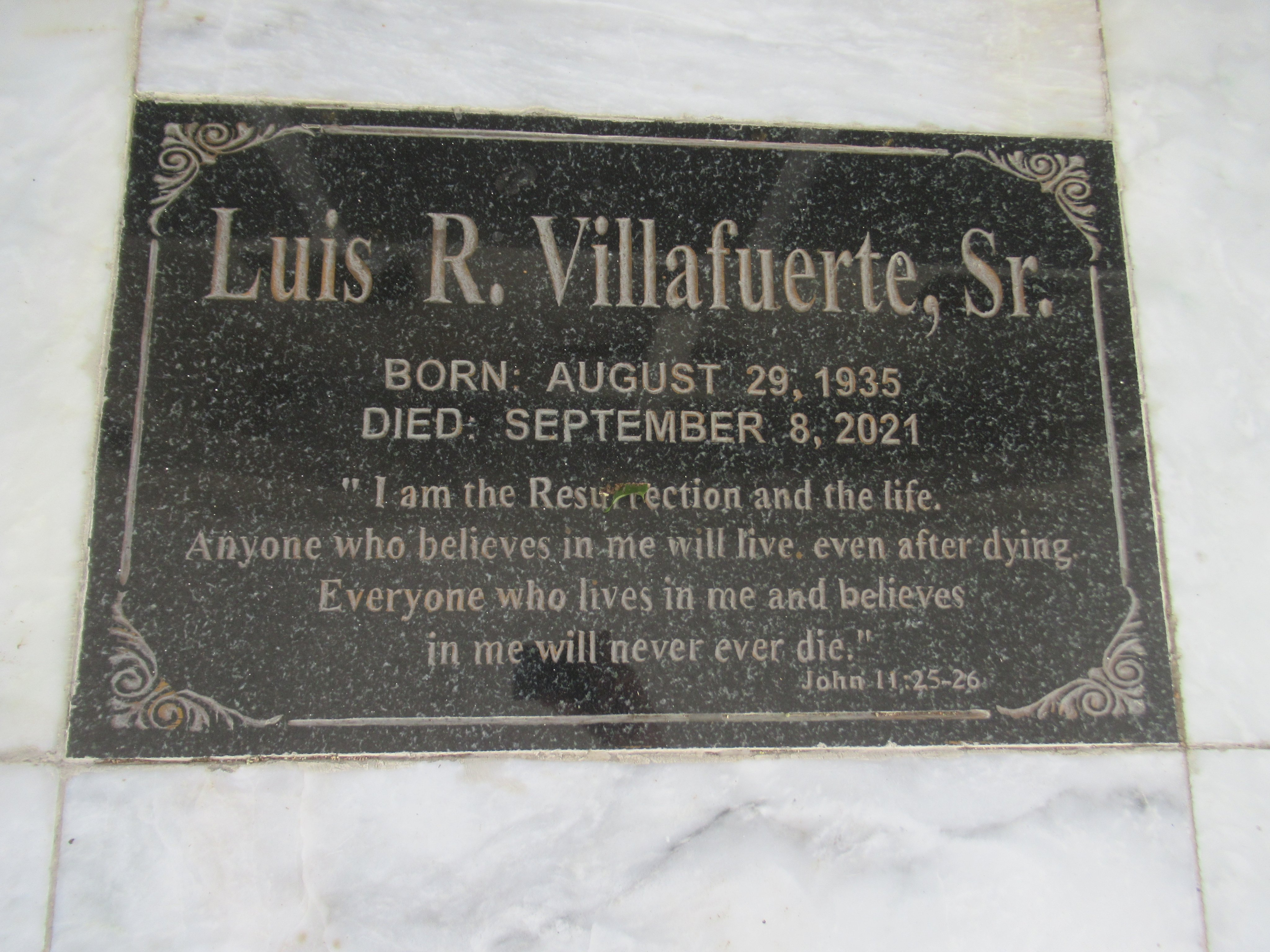
Villafuerte's grave at Manila Memorial Park – Sucat.

Villafuerte was the uncle of Jesse Robredo, whom he influenced to enter politics beginning with the mayorship of Naga in 1988. However, the two fell out in 1992 following allegations of corruption and jueteng involving the Villafuertes, which led to Villafuerte disowning Robredo and attempting to have him disqualified from public office multiple times.

Villafuerte died on September 8, 2021, at the St. Luke's Medical Center – Global City, at the age of 86.

House of Representatives of the Philippines
Preceded by Arnulfo Fuentebella	Member of the House of Representatives from Camarines Sur's 3rd district 2010–2013	Succeeded by Leni Robredo
Preceded by Sulpicio S. Roco	Member of the House of Representatives from Camarines Sur's 2nd district 2004–2010	Succeeded by Diosdado Macapagal Arroyo
Political offices
Preceded by Jose Bulaong	Governor of Camarines Sur; 1995–2004	Succeeded by Luis Raymund Villafuerte
Preceded by Felix Fuentebella	Governor of Camarines Sur; 1986–1992	Succeeded by Jose Bulaong
Government offices
Preceded by Roberto Ongpin	Minister of Trade; 1979–1981	Post dissolved
