= Dato Arroyo =

Filipino politician

The Honorable Dato Arroyo
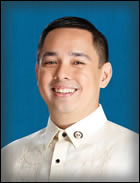
- Official portrait, 2013

Member of the Philippine House of Representatives from Camarines Sur
- In office June 30, 2010 – June 30, 2016
- Preceded by: Luis Villafuerte Sr.
- Succeeded by: Luis Raymund Villafuerte
- Constituency: 2nd District
- In office June 30, 2007 – June 30, 2010
- Preceded by: Vacant (post last held by Rolando Andaya Jr.)
- Succeeded by: Rolando Andaya Jr.
- Constituency: 1st District

Personal details
- Born: Diosdado Ignacio Jose Maria Macapagal Arroyo; September 4, 1974 (age 52) Manila, Philippines
- Party: Lakas (2008–present)
- Other political affiliations: KAMPI (2007–2008)
- Spouse: Victoria "Kakai" Manotok (m. 2003)
- Parent(s): Jose Miguel Arroyo (father); Gloria Macapagal Arroyo (mother)
- Relatives: Mikey Arroyo (brother)
- Education: Ateneo de Naga University (BSBA)

Diosdado Ignacio Jose Maria "Dato" Macapagal Arroyo (Tagalog: [ˈdɐtɔ makapaˈgal ɐˈɾɔjɔ]; born September 4, 1974) is a Filipino politician who served as a member of the House of Representatives from 2007 to 2016. He represented Camarines Sur's 1st district from 2007 to 2010, and the 2nd district from 2010 to 2016. Born into the Macapagal family, his mother, Gloria Macapagal Arroyo, served as the 14th president of the Philippines, while his grandfather and namesake, Diosdado Macapagal, was the 9th president.

== Early life ==
Diosdado Ignacio Jose Maria Macapagal Arroyo was born on September 4, 1974, in Manila, and comes from a family of public servants. His father, Jose Miguel Arroyo, is the First Gentleman of the Philippines, and his mother, Gloria Macapagal-Arroyo is the 14th President of the Philippines, and his grandfather was the late former Philippine President Diosdado Macapagal who served from 1961 to 1965, as the 9th President of the Philippines.

== Education ==
Arroyo took his elementary and high school education at the Ateneo de Manila graduating in 1992. He finished his college education at the Ateneo de Naga University in October 1997 with a Bachelor of Science in Business Administration, Major in Legal Management.

== Career ==
Arroyo worked as one of President Gloria Macapagal Arroyo's speechwriters, and also served as an intern with the Ateneo Human Rights Center. He proudly considers himself a Bicolano by choice (although he is ethnically half Ilonggo and half Pampangueño on both sides of his family with partial Ilocano ancestry from his maternal grandmother), and has been actively supporting programs for the Bicol Region since graduating from college, particularly in areas concerning the provision of basic needs, Bicol tourism and sports. Recognizing his efforts, he was officially made an Adopted Son of Camarines Sur in November 2004, Lived somewhere in Barangay Dayangdang and soon moved to Libmanan.

In 2005, Arroyo set up the Amigo Foundation, with the objective of helping out of those with less in life. The foundation has pushed for and promoted various livelihood, health, education, youth and sports programs not only within the Bicol Region, but around the country as well.

Aside from the founding the Amigo Foundation, Arroyo was also the president of the Metro Manila Chapter of the Ateneo de Naga Alumni Association, and the Chairman of the Bicol Regional Tourism Summit.

== Political life ==
Promoting his platform of TKO, or "Tubig, Kalye, Oportunidad" in the 2007 elections, Arroyo ran and won as Representative of the First District of Camarines Sur, winning in over 80% of the barangays and leading by more than 30,000 votes over his nearest rival. In Congress, Dato is active as a member of 12 committees. He serves as vice-chairman in the Committees of Agriculture and Food, Youth and Sports Development, and Bicol Recovery and Development, making him the only first-term congressman with three vice-chairmanships. Aside from having a perfect attendance record in sessions, he has already filed numerous pro-poor bills and resolutions, including those on cheaper medicines, tax exemptions for minimum wage earners, and the use of agrarian land as collateral. He has consistently been chosen as one of the Most Outstanding Congressmen by various organizations and publications.

== Personal life ==
Arroyo married banker Victoria "Kakai" Manotok on May 16, 2003. Their wedding sponsors included: actress-singer Sharon Cuneta, businessman Jaime Zobel de Ayala, and the House Speaker's wife, Gina de Venecia. Former presidents Corazon Aquino and Fidel V. Ramos were among the guests.
