= Luis Raymund Villafuerte =

Filipino politician

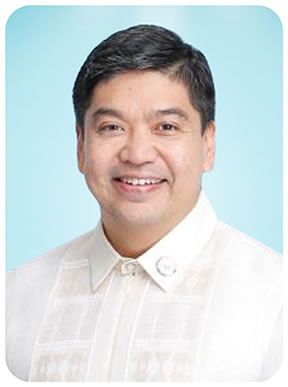
- Official portrait, 2022

Governor of Camarines Sur
- Incumbent
- Assumed office June 30, 2025
- Vice Governor: Salvio Patrick Fortuno Jr.
- Preceded by: Luigi Villafuerte
- In office June 30, 2004 – June 30, 2013
- Vice Governor: Salvio Fortuno (2004–2010); Fortunato Peña (2010–2013)
- Preceded by: Luis Villafuerte Sr.
- Succeeded by: Miguel Luis Villafuerte

Member of the Philippine House of Representatives from Camarines Sur's 2nd district
- In office June 30, 2016 – June 30, 2025
- Preceded by: Dato Arroyo
- Succeeded by: Luigi Villafuerte

Deputy Speaker of the Philippine House of Representatives
- In office July 22, 2019 – October 14, 2020
- House Speaker: Alan Peter Cayetano
- Succeeded by: Mikee Romero

President of the National Unity Party
- In office August 23, 2022 – March 16, 2025
- Succeeded by: Ronaldo Puno

Personal details
- Born: Luis Raymund Favis Villafuerte Jr. June 3, 1968 (age 58) Ermita, Manila, Philippines
- Party: NUP (2021–present)
- Other political affiliations: Nacionalista (2009–2021); Lakas (2003–2009); LAMMP (1998)
- Spouse: Lara Reyes Villafuerte
- Children: 4 (inc. Miguel Luis and Vincenzo Renato Luigi)
- Education: De La Salle University (BA); Stanford University
- Occupation: Public servant
- Profession: Businessman
- Website: lrayvillafuerte.com

Luis Raymund "L-Ray" Favis Villafuerte Jr. (born June 3, 1968) is a Filipino politician who is the governor of Camarines Sur since 2025; he also served in the same position from 2004 to 2013. He previously served as the Representative of Camarines Sur's 2nd district from 2016 to 2025. He was a House Deputy Speaker from 2019 until October 14, 2020.

He belongs to a family of politicians. His father is former governor Luis Villafuerte Sr., while two of his sons also served as governors of Camarines Sur: Miguel Luis Villafuerte and Luigi Villafuerte. He was born with a mixture of Bicolano and Ilocano roots, as his father Luis Villafuerte Sr., is a Bicolano, while his mother, Nelly Favis-Villafuerte, a lawyer, columnist, and a former official of Department and Trade Industry and a member of the Monetary Board of Bangko Sentral ng Pilipinas, came from the Favis family of Vigan, Ilocos Sur.

== Business career ==
He and his wife Lara own Lara's Gift and Décor, Inc., an export company serving clients in different countries. They were the only Philippine business directly selling to Target branches in the United States.

He was the President of Lara's Gift and Décor, Inc from 1990 to 2004, and President of Lara's Gift and Décor, Inc. U.S.A. from 2000 to 2004. He was also the President of Bicol Broadcasting Systems, Inc. (2001–2004), Global Merchandising Services Ltd. (2001–2004), Digitext Asia Corporation (2002–2004), and the Philippine Association of Medical Transcription, Inc. (2001–2004).

Currently, he is the CEO of Republic Wakeparks Inc. (operator of CamSur Watersports Complex), President of Blank Boardsports Supply Company Inc., vice-president of Breddas Inc., and a Trustee of the Philippine Center for Entrepreneurship and the likes.

He is also President of Villafuerte Brotherhood Foundation, Inc, (2001–present) and of Philippine Water Ski and Wakeboard Federation, Inc. (2006-president) and serves as vice-president of Asian Wakeboarding Association (2001–present) and an executive board member of the Boy Scouts of the Philippines Camarines Sur Council (2003–present).

== Political career ==
=== House of Representatives ===
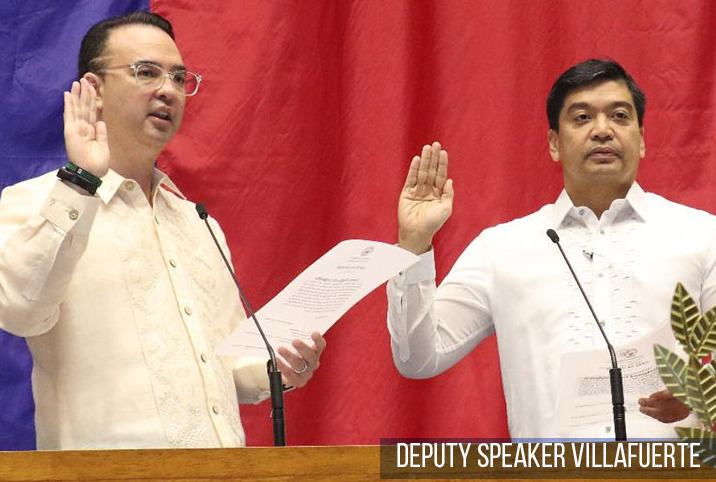
Villafuerte taking his oath of office as Deputy House Speaker on July 27, 2019

During the 2020 House leadership crisis, Villafuerte supported House Speaker Alan Peter Cayetano's refusal to step down after Lord Allan Velasco was elected as the new speaker, Villafuerte was ousted from being a deputy speaker on October 14 and was replaced by Mikee Romero, a Velasco ally who was removed as a deputy speaker two weeks prior by Cayetano's side.

In a statement, Villafuerte announced that he will continue to support President Rodrigo Duterte's legislative agenda, and added "if the intention of removing me was to intimidate all those who remain loyal to former Speaker Cayetano, then they have miscalculated badly." He also accused the new leadership of "rejecting" the Cayetano faction's "offers of cooperation."

== Electoral history ==
Electoral history of Luis Raymund Villafuerte
| Year | Office | Party | Votes received | | | | Result |
| Year | Office | Party | Total | % | P. | Swing | Result |
|---|---|---|---|---|---|---|---|
| 1998 | Mayor of Naga City | LAMMP | 14,329 | 28.02% | 2nd | —N/a | Lost |
| 2004 | Governor of Camarines Sur | Lakas | 246,785 | 49.65% | 1st | —N/a | Won |
| 2007 | Governor of Camarines Sur | Lakas | 322,716 | 70.35% | 1st | +20.70 | Won |
| 2010 | Governor of Camarines Sur | Nacionalista | 400,690 | 67.71% | 1st | -2.64 | Won |
| 2025 | Governor of Camarines Sur | NUP | 526,887 | 54.84% | 1st | -12.87 | Won |
| 2013 | Representative (Camarines Sur–2nd) | Nacionalista | 49,436 | 41.43% | 2nd | —N/a | Lost |
| 2016 | Representative (Camarines Sur–2nd) | Nacionalista | 88,693 | 59.62% | 1st | +18.19 | Won |
| 2019 | Representative (Camarines Sur–2nd) | Nacionalista | 80,029 | 51.09 | 1st | -8.53 | Won |
| 2022 | Representative (Camarines Sur–2nd) | NUP | 111,743 | 78.65% | 1st | +27.56 | Won |

House of Representatives of the Philippines
| Preceded by Dato Arroyo | Member of the House of Representatives from Camarines Sur's 2nd district 2016–2025 | Succeeded by Luigi Villafuerte |
Political offices
| Preceded by Luigi Villafuerte | Governor of Camarines Sur (second stint); 2025–present | Incumbent |
| Preceded by Luis Villafuerte Sr. | Governor of Camarines Sur (first stint); 2004–2013 | Succeeded by Miguel Luis Villafuerte |
