= Mariano Perfecto =

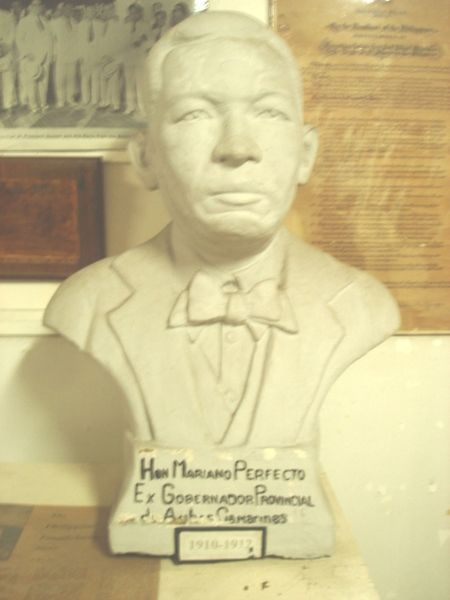
Mariano Perfecto

Mariano Perfecto (1853 - November 3, 1913) was the fifth Governor of Ambos Camarines (1910–1913). Known as a prolific writer, he is considered as the "Father of Bikol Literature," and the "Father of Bisayan Literature." He published the first newspaper in the Bikol language, An Parabareta (1899–1900) and set up the first printing press in the Bikol region, the Libreria y Imprenta Mariana. His literary output ranged from translations of religious tracts, novenas to poems, short dramas and linguistic works both in the Ilonggo and Bikol languages.

Salvador Pons, an Augustinian friar, stated in one of his works (Sacerdotes Del Clero Secular Filipino Escritores. 1900) that Perfecto was a secular priest and likewise Fr. Pablo Fernandez in his book History of the Church in the Philippines (1521-1898) said the same thing but the source he cited was the same Augustinian friar.
