= Manuel Fuentebella =

The Honourable Manuel T. Fuentebella

Member of the Philippine House of Representatives from Camarines Sur's 2nd District
- In office 1925–1928
- Preceded by: Sulpicio V. Cea
- In office 1928–1931
- Succeeded by: Severo Cea

Personal details
- Born: Manuel Fuentebella y Tría; October 11, 1889 Sagñay, Ambos Camarines
- Died: February 26, 1955 (aged 65) Sagñay, Camarines Sur
- Party: Nacionalista Party
- Education: University of Santo Tomas
- Occupation: Politician
- Profession: Doctor

Manuel Tría Fuentebella (October 11, 1889 – February 26, 1955) was the Member of the Philippine House of Representatives from Camarines Sur's 2nd District from 1925 to 1931 in the 7th and 8th Philippine Legislature.

== Early life and education ==
Manuel Fuentebella was born on October 11, 1889, in Sagñay, Ambos Camarines to then Ambos Camarines Governor Mariano Fuentebella and Perpetua Tria. His brother was former senator, legislator, ambassador and foreign affairs adviser Jose Fuentebella. Another brother, Felix Fuentebella, served as a congressman and Governor of Camarines Sur. He graduated from the University of Santo Tomas medical school and practiced medicine in his hometown of Sagñay.

== Political and professional career ==
He was elected to the 7th and 8th Philippine Legislature as a representative of Camarines Sur and served two terms from 1925 to 1931.

During his term in Congress, he chaired the Philippine Assembly's Committee on Women's Suffrage and was instrumental in the passage of the law that gave women the right to vote. He also proposed a hospital to be set up in each municipality and led medical missions in Camarines Sur.

His first love was writing. An ardent nationalist, he wrote poems in Spanish and Bicol about love and patriotism, notably "The Arrow" which describes the arrow that native Bul-og shot against the Lion of Castille and the Eagle of America.

He was also an orator and a composer. His early musical compositions, presented by nephews and cousins, were staged in the towns.

Manuel stepped away from the public limelight to continue his medical practice, but politics never left him and he remained an adviser to his brother Jose.

The Dr. Manuel Fuentebella Memorial Hospital in Sagñay is named after him.

== Death ==
He died of a heart attack on February 26, 1955.
