= Tinambac =

Municipality in Camarines Sur, Philippines

- Municipality
- Municipality of Tinambac
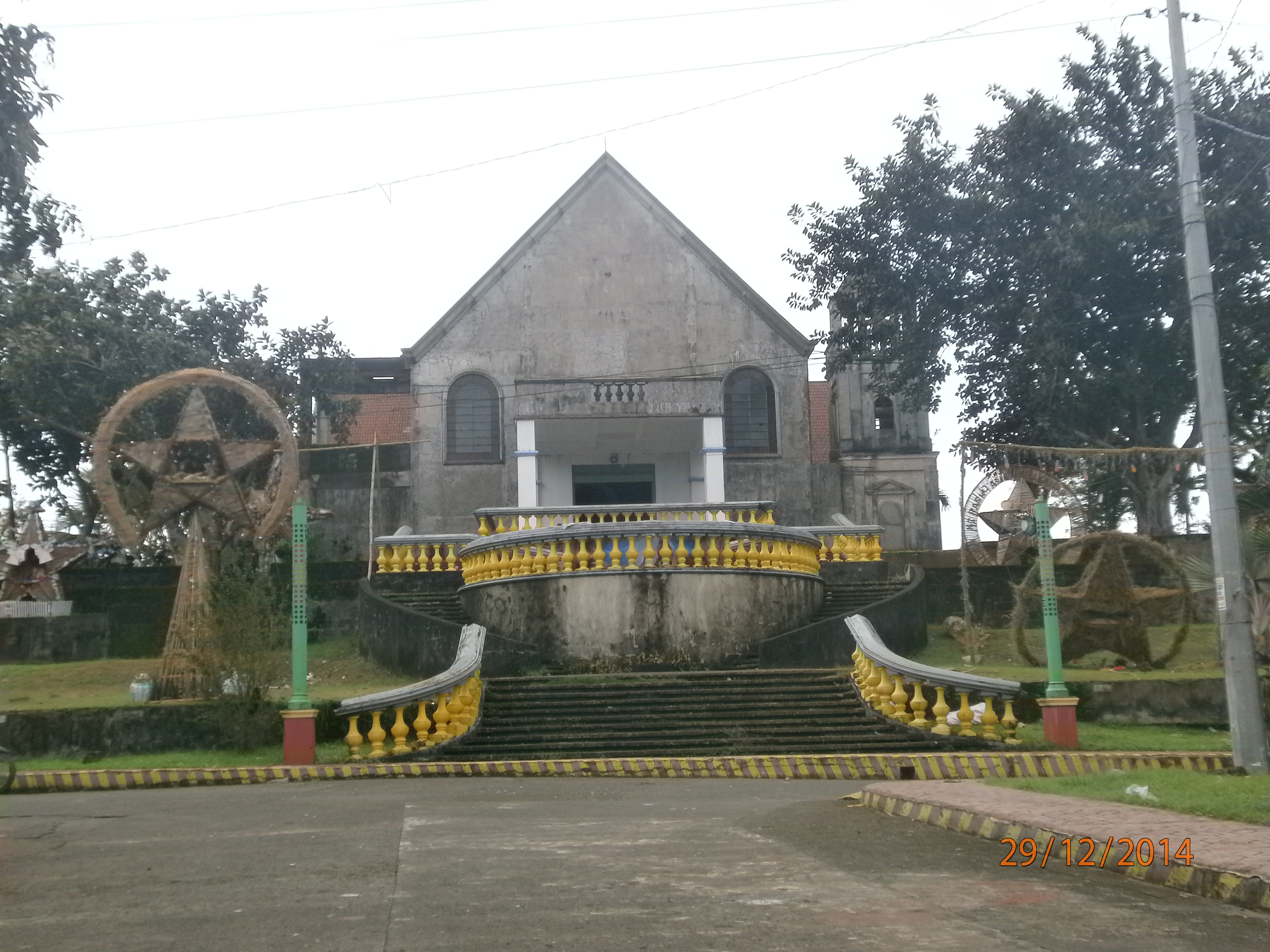
- San Pascual Baylon Parish Church

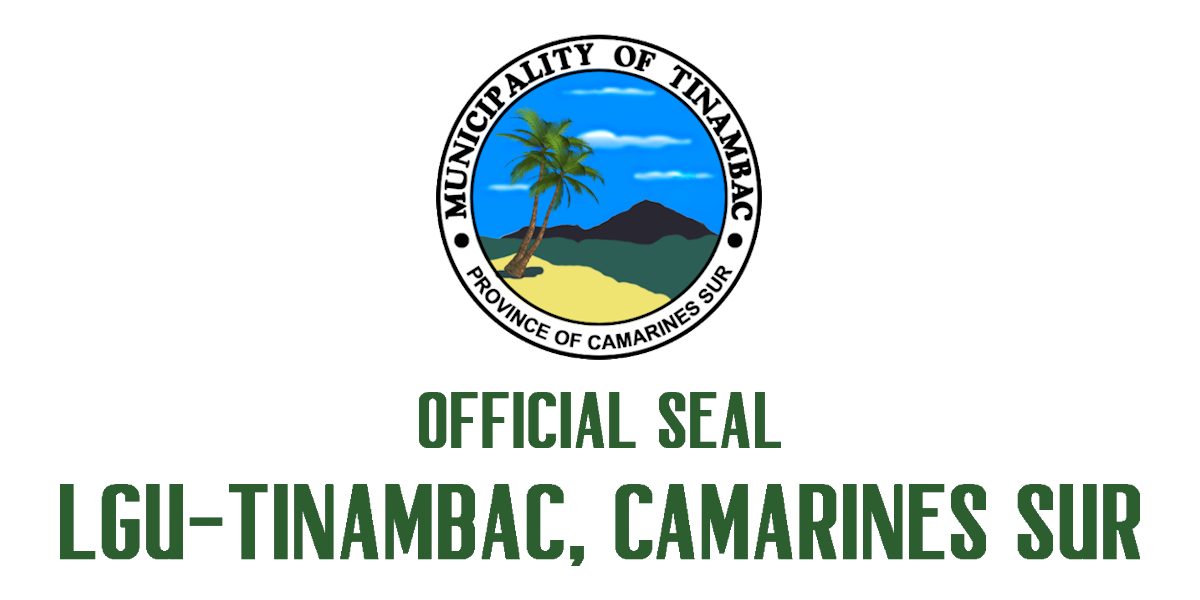
- Flag

- Map of Camarines Sur with Tinambac highlighted
- Interactive map of Tinambac
- Location within the Philippines
- Coordinates: 13°49′06″N 123°19′28″E
- Country: Philippines
- Region: Bicol Region
- Province: Camarines Sur
- District: 4th district
- Founded: 1888
- Barangays: 44 (see Barangays)

Government
  - Type: Sangguniang Bayan
  - Mayor: Edward Albert P. Prades
  - Vice Mayor: Ervin T. Borja
  - Representative: Arnulf Bryan B. Fuentebella
  - Municipal Council: Members: Rosito T. Velarde; Ruel T. Velarde; Glenn F. Abiog; Jona A. Geronimo; Giuseppe P. Prades; Francisco Delos Reyes Jr.; Gina Brioso; Leo Crispin Arganda
  - Electorate: 47,492 voters (2025)

Area
  - Total: 351.62 km^{2} (135.76 sq mi)
- Elevation: 76 m (249 ft)
- Highest elevation: 1,972 m (6,470 ft)
- Lowest elevation: 0 m (0 ft)

Population (2024 census)
  - Total: 69,860
  - Density: 198.7/km^{2} (514.6/sq mi)
  - Households: 15,167

Economy
  - Income class: 1st municipal income class
  - Poverty incidence: 36.09% (2023)
  - Revenue: ₱ 320.2 million (2024)
  - Assets: ₱ 706.8 million (2024)
  - Expenditure: ₱ 249.9 million (2024)
  - Liabilities: ₱ 309.7 million (2024)

Service provider
  - Electricity: Camarines Sur 2 Electric Cooperative (CASURECO 2)
  - Water: Partido Water Supply System
- Time zone: UTC+8 (PST)
- ZIP code: 4426
- PSGC: 0501737000
- IDD : area code: +63 (0)54
- Native languages: Central Bikol; Tagalog
- Website: tinambac.gov.ph

Tinambac, officially the Municipality of Tinambac (Central Bikol: Banwaan kan Tinambac; Tagalog: Bayan ng Tinambac), is a municipality in the province of Camarines Sur, Philippines. According to the 2024 census, it has a population of 69,860 people.

== History ==
The town of Tinambac was considered to be a trading center of villages surrounding the eastern side of Mt. Isarog. It was in this place where tobacco, then a prohibited product, was exchanged by the townspeople of Tinambac.

Its establishment as a separate municipality occurred during the latter part of the 18th century and this was known as the mission post of Himoragat. In 1829 when the Spanish administration divided the province of Camarines Sur into four districts, Tinambac fell under the District of Isarog.

== Geography ==
=== Barangays ===
Tinambac is politically subdivided into 44 barangays. Each barangay consists of puroks and some have sitios.

- Agay-Ayan
- Antipolo
- Bagacay
- Banga
- Bolaobalite
- Bani
- Bataan
- Binalay (Poblacion)
- Buenavista
- Buyo
- Cagliliog
- Caloco
- Camagong
- Canayonan
- Cawaynan
- Daligan
- Filarca (Poblacion)
- La Purisima (Poblacion)
- Lupi
- Magsaysay (Camp 4)
- Magtang
- Mananao
- La Medalla (Mile 9)
- New Caaluan
- Olag Grande
- Olag Pequeño
- Old Caaluan
- Pag-Asa
- Pantat
- Sagrada (Camp 6)
- Salvacion
- San Antonio
- San Isidro (Poblacion)
- San Jose (Tiltilan)
- San Pascual (Poblacion)
- San Ramon (Camp 7)
- San Roque
- San Vicente
- Santa Cruz (Poblacion)
- Sogod
- Tambang
- Tierra Nevada
- Union
- Salvacion Poblacion

=== Climate ===
Climate data for Tinambac, Camarines Sur
Month	Jan	Feb	Mar	Apr	May	Jun	Jul	Aug	Sep	Oct	Nov	Dec	Year
Mean daily maximum °C (°F)	31 (88)	30 (86)	33 (91)	35 (95)	36 (97)	36 (97)	35 (95)	34 (93)	35 (95)	33 (91)	32 (90)	31 (88)	33 (92)
Mean daily minimum °C (°F)	27 (81)	27 (81)	28 (82)	30 (86)	31 (88)	31 (88)	30 (86)	30 (86)	30 (86)	29 (84)	28 (82)	28 (82)	29 (84)
Average precipitation mm (inches)	62.63 (2.47)	114.71 (4.52)	41.44 (1.63)	56.32 (2.22)	105.22 (4.14)	175.86 (6.92)	192.89 (7.59)	110.61 (4.35)	130.78 (5.15)	546.13 (21.50)	232.90 (9.17)	462 (18.2)	2,231.49 (87.86)
Average rainy days	21	25	14	17	23	29	31	23	27	29	29	31	299
Source: World Weather Online

== Demographics ==
Population census of Tinambac
Year	Pop.	±% p.a.
1903	4,880	—
1918	5,507	+0.81%
1939	10,921	+3.31%
1948	14,103	+2.88%
1960	28,897	+6.16%
1970	36,357	+2.32%
1975	34,415	−1.09%
1980	39,621	+2.86%
1990	46,570	+1.63%
1995	49,185	+1.03%
2000	55,608	+2.67%
2007	59,125	+0.85%
2010	62,435	+2.00%
2015	67,572	+1.52%
2020	70,176	+0.80%
2024	69,860	−0.11%
Source: Philippine Statistics Authority

In the 2024 census, the population of Tinambac was 69,860 people, with a density of 200 inhabitants per square kilometre or 520 inhabitants per square mile.

Bikol is the predominant language.

== Economy ==
Poverty incidence of Tinambac (%)

Source: Philippine Statistics Authority

Total agricultural area is estimated to be 17,230 hectares (42,600 acres), 96% of which are planted with coconut. Only around 4% are devoted to rice, corn, banana and root crops. Fishponds cover around 464 hectares (1,150 acres) or 1.8% of the total agricultural area.

== Infrastructure ==
=== Communication facilities ===
- 1 Post Office located in the Poblacion, staffed by a Post Master and mail carriers
- Telegraph service offered by local branch of National Telecommunications Office
- Branches of RCPI and LBC Air Cargo
- Land line communication facilities

=== Health services ===
- Tinambac Municipal Hospital
- Medicare Community Hospital - Sogod, Tinambac
- RRB Maternity, Family Planning, and Lying-in Clinic

== Education ==
There are two schools district offices which govern all educational institutions within the municipality. They oversee the management and operations of all private and public, from primary to secondary schools. These are the:

- Tinambac North Schools District
- Tinambac South Schools District

=== Primary and elementary schools ===
- Agay-ayan Elementary School
- Antipolo Elementary School
- Bagacay Elementary School
- Banga Elementary School
- Bani Elementary School
- Bataan Elementary School
- Bayang Elementary School
- Binalay Elementary School
- Bolaobalite Elementary School
- Buenavista Elementary School
- Buyo Elementary School
- Caaluan Elementary School
- Cagliliog Elementary School
- Caloco Elementary School
- Camagong Elementary School
- Canayonan Elementary School
- Cawaynan Elementary School
- Christi Mari Learning Center
- Daligan Elementary School
- Lupi Elementary School
- Magsaysay Elementary School
- Magtang Elementary School
- Malibtong Elementary School
- Mananao Elementary School
- Mile 9 Elementary School
- Olag Grande Elementary School
- Olag Pequeño Elementary School
- Pag-asa Elementary School
- Pantat Elementary School
- Refugio Elementary School
- Sagrada Elementary School
- Salvacion Elementary School
- San Antonio Elementary School
- San Jose Elementary School
- San Ramon Elementary School
- San Roque Elementary School
- San Vicente Elementary School
- Sogod Elementary School
- TAMBANG Central School
- Tierra Nevada Elementary School
- Tinambac Central School I
- Tinambac South Central School II
- Union Elementary School

=== Secondary schools ===
- Agay-ayan National High School
- Antipolo National High School
- Bagacay High School
- Banga National High School
- Buenavista National High School
- Canayonan National High School
- Don Servillano Platon Memorial National High School
- Gregorio O. Bercasio Memorial High School
- Magsaysay National High School
- Rabano High School
- Sagrada National High School
- San Ramon Provincial High School
- Tamban National High School
- Tierra Nevada National High School

== Gallery ==
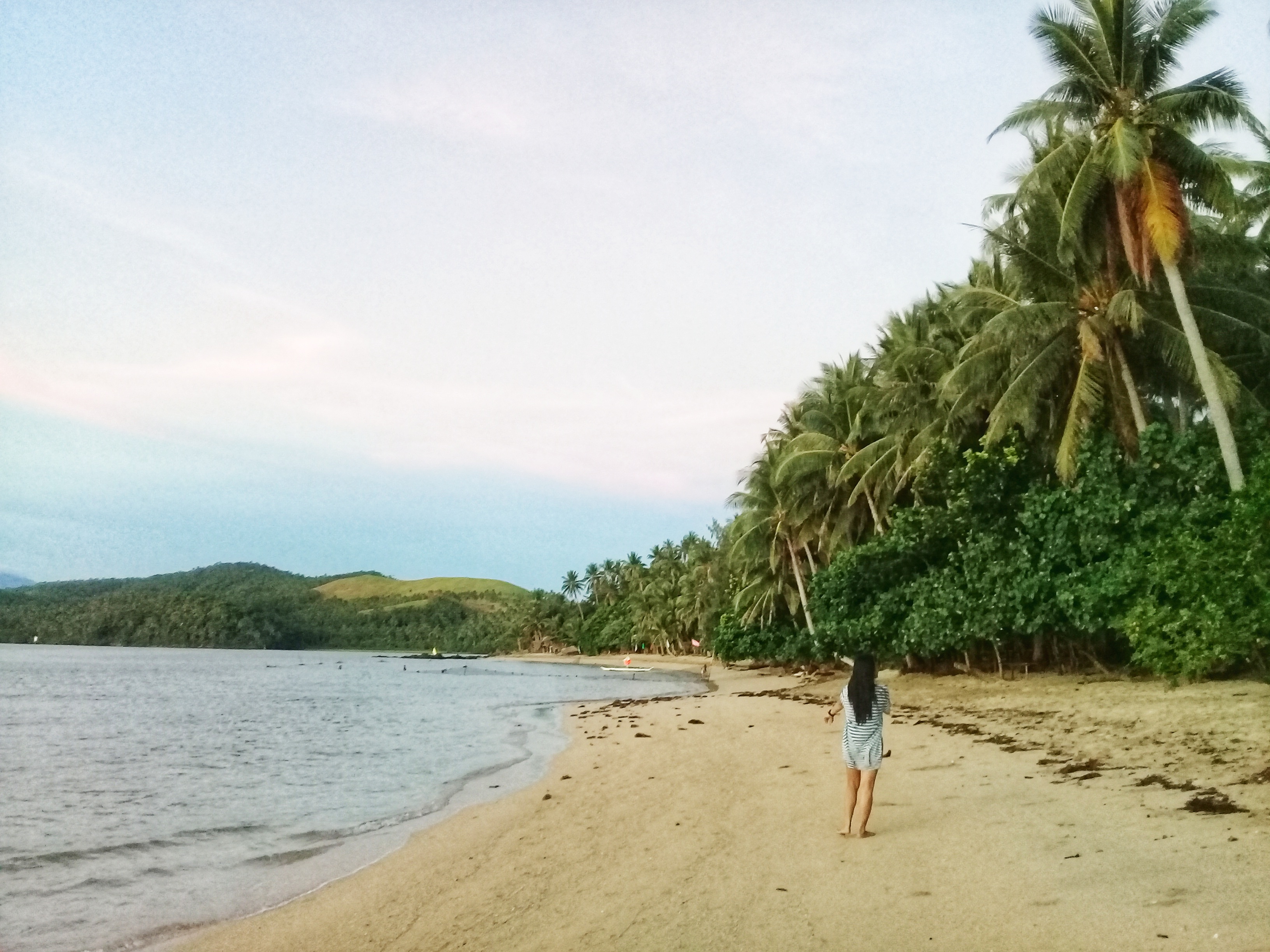
Caloco Beach

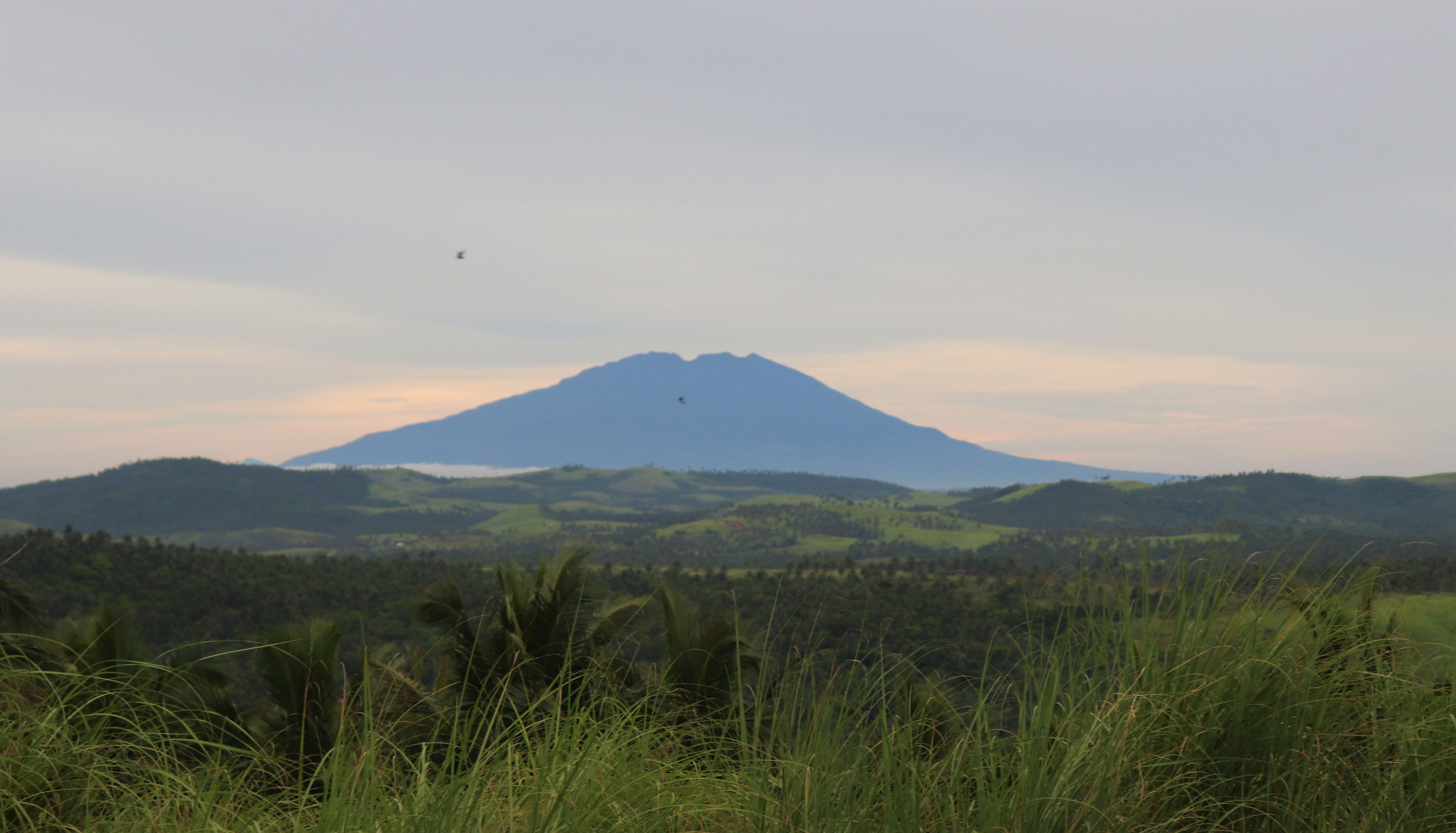
View of Mount Isarog from Barangay San Antonio

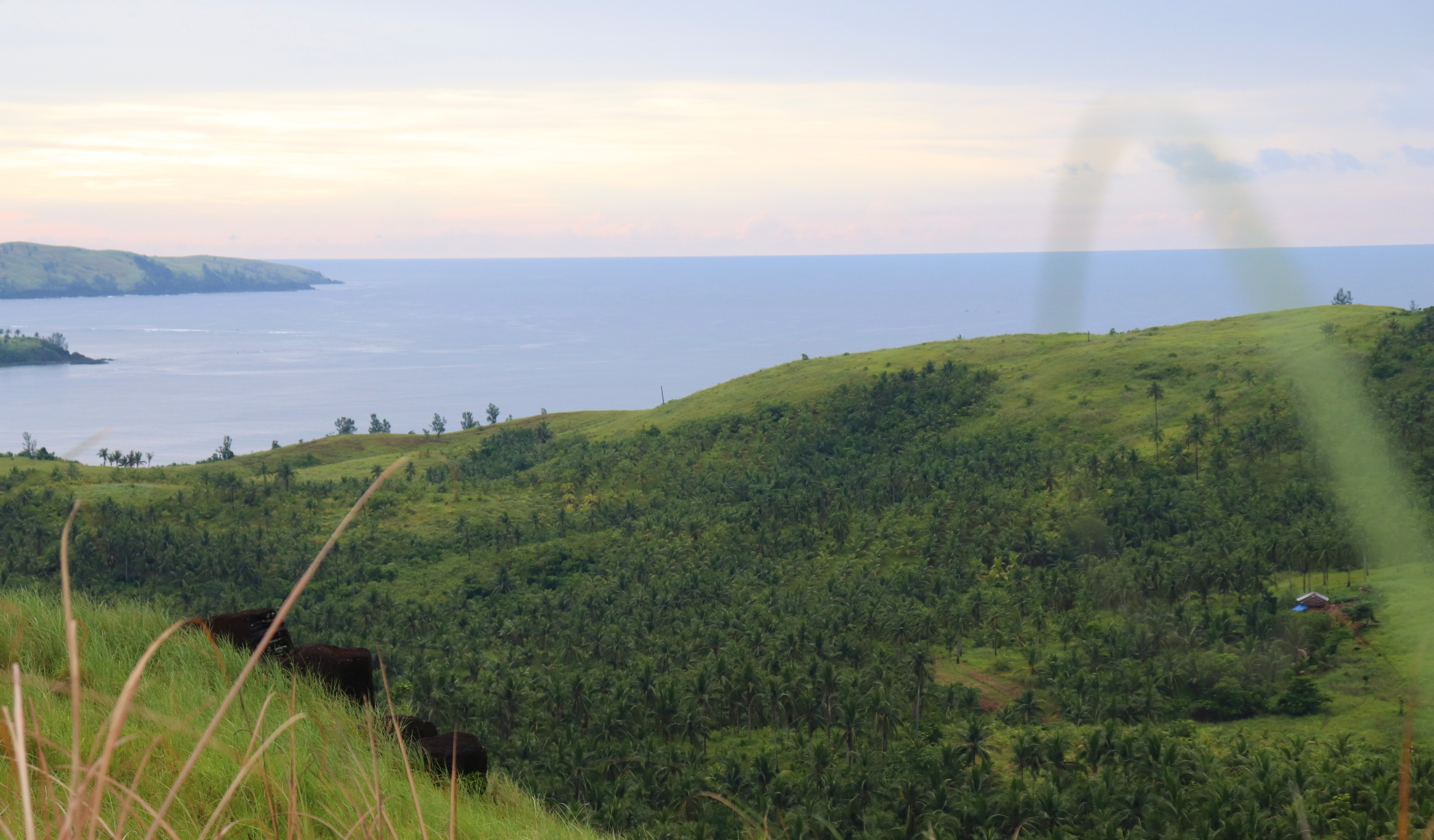
View of San Miguel Bay from Barangay San Antonio
