= Tigaon, Camarines Sur =

Municipality in Camarines Sur, Philippines

Tigaon
- Municipality
- Municipality of Tigaon
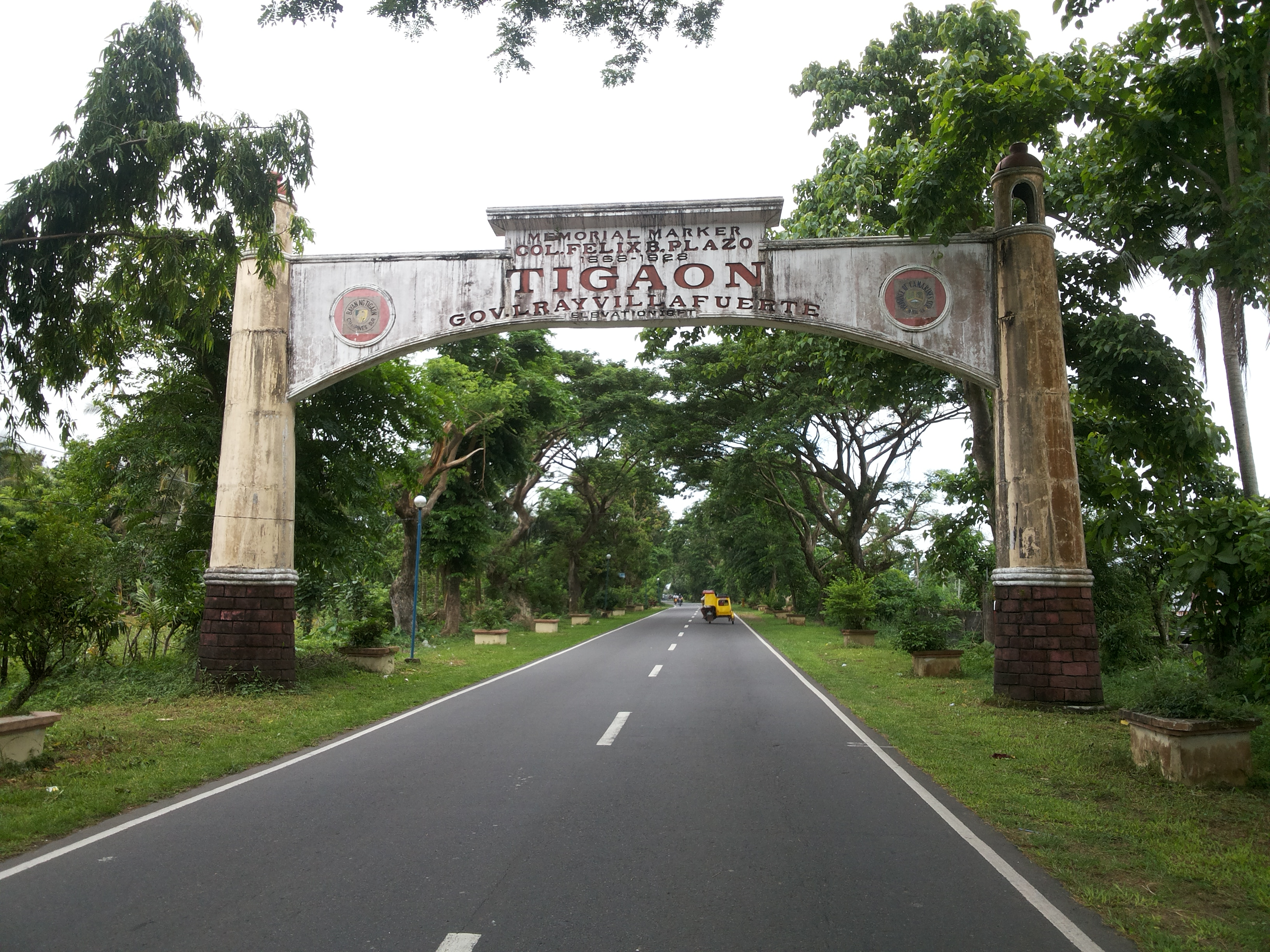

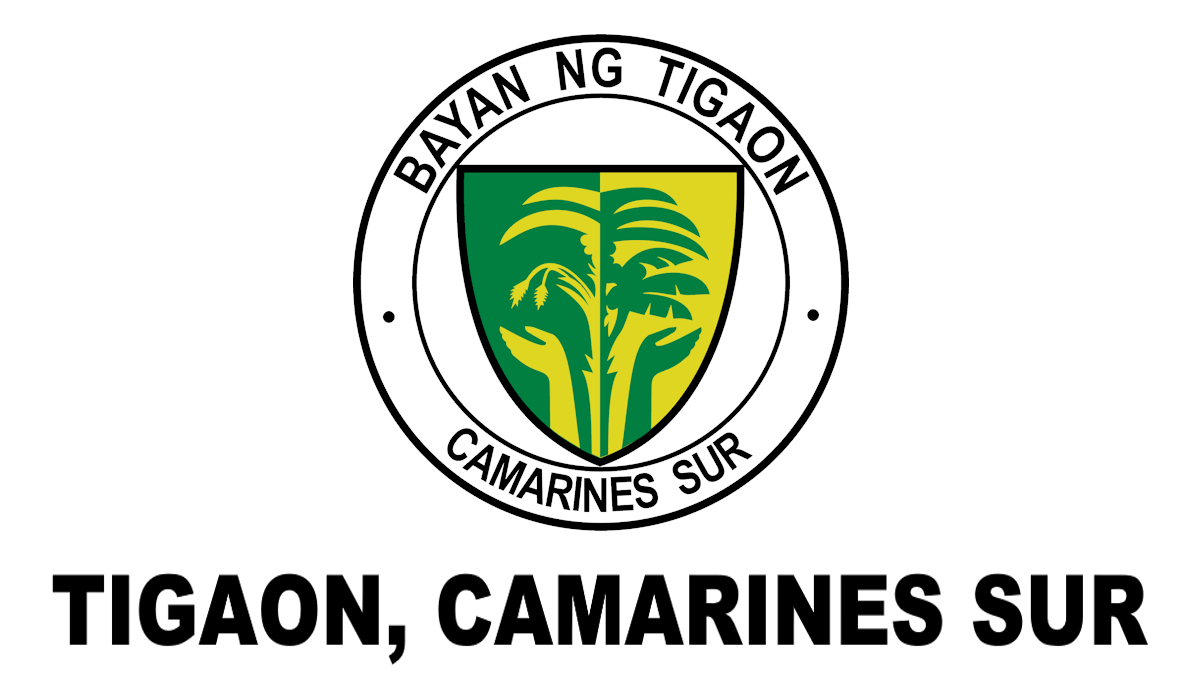
- Flag

- Map of Camarines Sur with Tigaon highlighted
- Interactive map of Tigaon
- Location within the Philippines
- Coordinates: 13°37′55″N 123°29′51″E
- Country: Philippines
- Region: Bicol Region
- Province: Camarines Sur
- District: 4th district
- Barangays: 23 (see Barangays)

Government
  - Type: Sangguniang Bayan
  - Mayor: Pamela Rinah B. Fuentebella
  - Vice Mayor: Jerome T. Lelis
  - Representative: Arnulf Bryan B. Fuentebella
  - Municipal Council: Members: Ma. Carla S. Pilapil; Saturnino R. Sanoy Jr.; Ruel D. Camato; Iryn F. Pelo; Allan P. Clariño; Ruel M. San Gaspar; Teudulfo B. Espinosa Sr.; (Vacant)
  - Electorate: 39,666 voters (2025)

Area
  - Total: 72.35 km^{2} (27.93 sq mi)
- Elevation: 91 m (299 ft)
- Highest elevation: 388 m (1,273 ft)
- Lowest elevation: 6 m (20 ft)

Population (2024 census)
  - Total: 61,790
  - Density: 854.0/km^{2} (2,212/sq mi)
  - Households: 13,324

Economy
  - Income class: 1st municipal income class
  - Poverty incidence: 29.6% (2023)
  - Revenue: ₱ 255.8 million (2024)
  - Assets: ₱ 697.8 million (2024)
  - Expenditure: ₱ 221.6 million (2024)
  - Liabilities: ₱ 96.5 million (2024)

Service provider
  - Electricity: Camarines Sur 4 Electric Cooperative (CASURECO 4)
- Time zone: UTC+8 (PST)
- ZIP code: 4420
- PSGC: 0501736000
- IDD : area code: +63 (0)54
- Native languages: Central Bikol; Tagalog
- Website: www.tigaon.gov.ph

Tigaon, officially the Municipality of Tigaon (Central Bikol: Banwaan kan Tigaon; Tagalog: Bayan ng Tigaon), is a municipality in the province of Camarines Sur, Philippines. According to the 2024 census, it has a population of 61,790 people.

It is known for its scenic rivers, caves, and waterfalls, making it a good place for outdoor activities like hiking, camping, and wildlife watching.

== Etymology ==
According to a certain parish priest, Fr. Marcos de Lisboa, the name of the town was attributed to the word "tigaw", a shrub that grew in abundance on the riverbanks, and whose leaves when pounded produced extracts which were used as poison to catch fish in rivers and swamps.

== History ==
=== Spanish colonial era ===
The Bicol Peninsula was first sighted by the Spaniards in August 1543 aboard the San Juan de Letran. In 1574, Captain Juan de Salcedo conquered the Bicol Region. In 1701, Tigaon was considered a sitio of Sagñay. In 1794, Tigaon was given her own parish under Fray Jose de Buensalida who carried the mission of St. Clare of Assisi, marking August 12 as her feast day.

Mayon Volcano's eruption in 1834 started a wave of migration from the neighboring province of Albay to the rich verdant slopes of Tigaon. As the Sword and the Cross became the bedrock of Spanish colonization in the Philippines, the parish priest symbolized the King of Spain and wielded immense power. This resulted in turmoil and continuous revolts against the atrocities of Spanish rule, thereby leading to the Philippine Revolution of 1898. For $20,000,000.00, Spain ceded the Philippines to the Americans.

In the early years of the 19th century, Camarines Sur was divided into four districts by the Spaniards. This division include the districts of Bikol, Rinconanda, Yraya and Mambulao. The mission of Tigaon in the part of Mount Isarog belonged to the Bikol district. The history of this town, according to written accounts, was considered to be confusing as there are conflicting records with regards to its establishment as a municipality.

=== World War II and Japanese occupation ===
In 1941, the Second World War broke. The Japanese troops entered Tigaon during the term of Mayor Lino Cabaero. The guerrilla movement evolved as an offshoot of Japanese cruelty. Clashes were frequent and the church became a sanctuary of most guerrillas. Fr. Tomas Bernales was parish priest during the period 1941−1942. Fr. Florencio Gonzales took over in 1942. The infamous Death March propelled Doña Leonor Moll to rescue her son, Dr. Heriberto Moll and forty other Bicolanos from the clutches of death. Lt. Salvador Natividad died fighting the Japanese at Mabalodbalod. Captain Edmundo B. Cea and Majors Salvador and Tomas Garchitorena were at the forefront of the clashes with the Japanese. Don Pascual Leelin freely disposed his sacks of rice to fellow-Tigaoeños before enemies could confiscate them. In 1945, American forces came back to reclaim the Philippines, thus paving the way for the surrender of the beleaguered Japanese Imperial Army.

=== Third Republic ===
With the advent of independence, Tigaoeños found freedom of expression through the arts. An abundance of painters, poets, and actors emerged from this town. Luisita Venida was the first Tigaoeña child actress while Jesus ‘Og’ Ramos became the Tarzan of local cinema and acclaimed “Mr. Philippines”. In the late fifties, Batas Pambansa 129 made Tigaon the seat of the CFI in Partido District. Politics thrived. Don Mariano Garchitorena became Governor of Camarines Sur in 1945. Sebastian Caruso Moll was elected Congressman under the Quirino administration. The same administration chose Don Mariano Garchitorena Secretary of Agriculture. Edmundo B. Cea, the first Asian to be invited as guest speaker to the United Nations, served as a congressman and a senator during the 1950s, as a delegate to the 1971 Constitutional Convention and as a member of the Batasang Pambansa from 1984 to 1986. Jose Fuentebella was ambassador to Indonesia during the Garcia administration. Parish Priest Fr. Florencio Gonzales was succeeded by Fr. Pedro Oliva (1948−1967). Municipal mayors of Tigaon during these years: Heriberto R. Moll (1945-1957); Jose Bosito (1958-1964) and again Heriberto R. Moll (1964−1967).

There was a time when Tigaon was solely owned by seven hacienderos, namely P. Baduria, L. Cea, J. Jacob, M. Estela, A. Garchitorena and S. Moll. Their lands were later distributed to the people through agrarian reform.

The New People's Army rebellion in the Bicol Region began in Tigaon in 1970. Described as a "semi-feudal and semi-colonial society" by lawyer and Bicolano scholar Soliman Santos Jr., Tigaon was chosen as the NPA's regional base in Bicol by five members of the Communist Party of the Philippines: Marco Baduria, Nonito Zape, David Brucelas, Francisco Portem, Ibarra Tubianosa. Brothers Romulo (Kumander Tangkad) and Ruben (Kumander Benjie) Jallores actively guided the growth of this movement. Agrarian unrest became the legitimate cause for the fuelling of socialist ideology. Tenants forcibly planted rice and corn within abaca lands, and eventually, abaca production declined.

=== Martial law ===
In 1972, martial law was declared. Agrarian reform was implemented. Felix Fuentebella was appointed governor in 1976, the same year Nelson Baduria Tria was ordained and became the first Tigaoeño priest. The Marcos dictatorship hunted down insurgents and tortured them. Senator Edmundo Cea took the cudgels for Ninoy Aquino's widow, Corazon. The church played an important role in the series of events that was to lead to the overthrow of Ferdinand Marcos in the EDSA Revolution of 1986. Tigaon's St. Clare of Assisi Parish became the rallying point of Cory Aquino's cause in Camarines Sur's third district. Parish priests in Tigaon were Fr. Jose Rey (1967−1984) and Fr. Felix Barela (1984−1985). In 1986, Fr. Gallardo Bombase, Jr. Dominican Priest was ordained. He became the first Filipino parish priest of Santisimo Rosario Parish, University of Santo Tomas, Sampaloc, Manila (1984-1993). Municipal Mayors during this time: Gualberto Cea Manlagñit (1968−1971); Lucio Palaypayon, Jr. (1972); Federico Moll (acting capacity, 1973–1974) Gallardo P. Bombase (acting capacity, 1974−1976); and Claudio Francisco (appointed 1976/ elected 1980−1986).

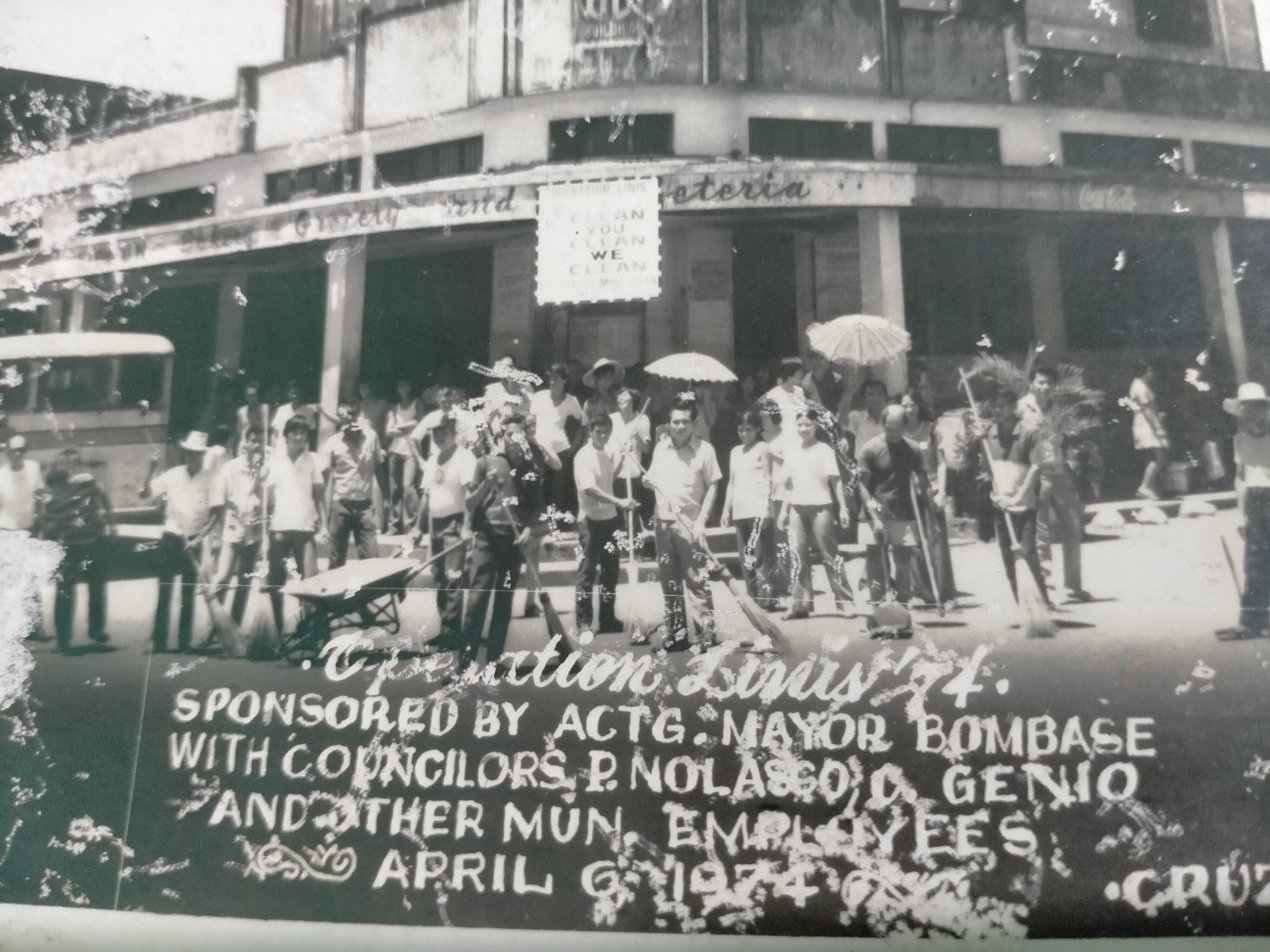
Sponsored by: Acting Mayor Bombase with Councilors Nolasco, Genio with other Municipal Employees

=== Contemporary period ===
Gradually, order was restored. The Senate and Congress were once again part of the country's democratic process. Delfin Recto was appointed mayor of Tigaon. Julian Cea Napal became Vice Governor of Camarines Sur. Francis Garchitorena occupied the position of Sandiganbayan Justice. The crusade of the NPA Movement gained recognition from the ruling administration. Continuing peace talks were held to resolve the differences between government and the CPP/NPA. The democratic form of government once more dominated the political scene.

== Geography ==
Tigaon is in the eastern part of the province of Camarines Sur, between Mount Isarog and Lagonoy Gulf, and occupies a total land area of 12,575 ha., 80% of which is flat. Of these, 1,045 hectare are irrigated riceland.

The west of the municipality is mountainous, and the east has a flat surface. It borders Goa and San Jose in the north and Ocampo to the west and Sagñay in the south and Lagonoy Gulf in the east. Tigaon is 30 kilometres (19 mi) from Pili and 480 kilometres (300 mi) from Manila.

=== Barangays ===
Tigaon is politically subdivided into 23 barangays. Each barangay consists of puroks and some have sitios.

- Abo
- Cabalinadan
- Caraycayon
- Casuna
- Consocep
- Coyaoyao
- Gaao
- Gingaroy
- Gubat
- Huyonhuyon
- Libod
- Mabalodbalod
- May-Anao
- Panagan
- Poblacion
- Salvacion
- San Antonio
- San Francisco
- San Miguel
- San Rafael
- Talojongon
- Tinawagan
- Vinagre

=== Climate ===
Climate data for Tigaon, Camarines Sur
Month	Jan	Feb	Mar	Apr	May	Jun	Jul	Aug	Sep	Oct	Nov	Dec	Year
Mean daily maximum °C (°F)	31 (88)	30 (86)	32 (90)	35 (95)	35 (95)	35 (95)	34 (93)	33 (91)	34 (93)	32 (90)	30 (86)	30 (86)	33 (91)
Mean daily minimum °C (°F)	26 (79)	26 (79)	28 (82)	30 (86)	31 (88)	30 (86)	29 (84)	29 (84)	29 (84)	28 (82)	27 (81)	27 (81)	28 (83)
Average precipitation mm (inches)	82.88 (3.26)	137.93 (5.43)	63.69 (2.51)	78.31 (3.08)	229.42 (9.03)	288.31 (11.35)	280.99 (11.06)	112.39 (4.42)	210.87 (8.30)	599.07 (23.59)	194.80 (7.67)	454.3 (17.89)	2,732.96 (107.59)
Average rainy days	24	28	18	20	24	29	31	27	27	30	29	31	318
Source: World Weather Online (modeled/calculated data, not measured locally)

== Demographics ==
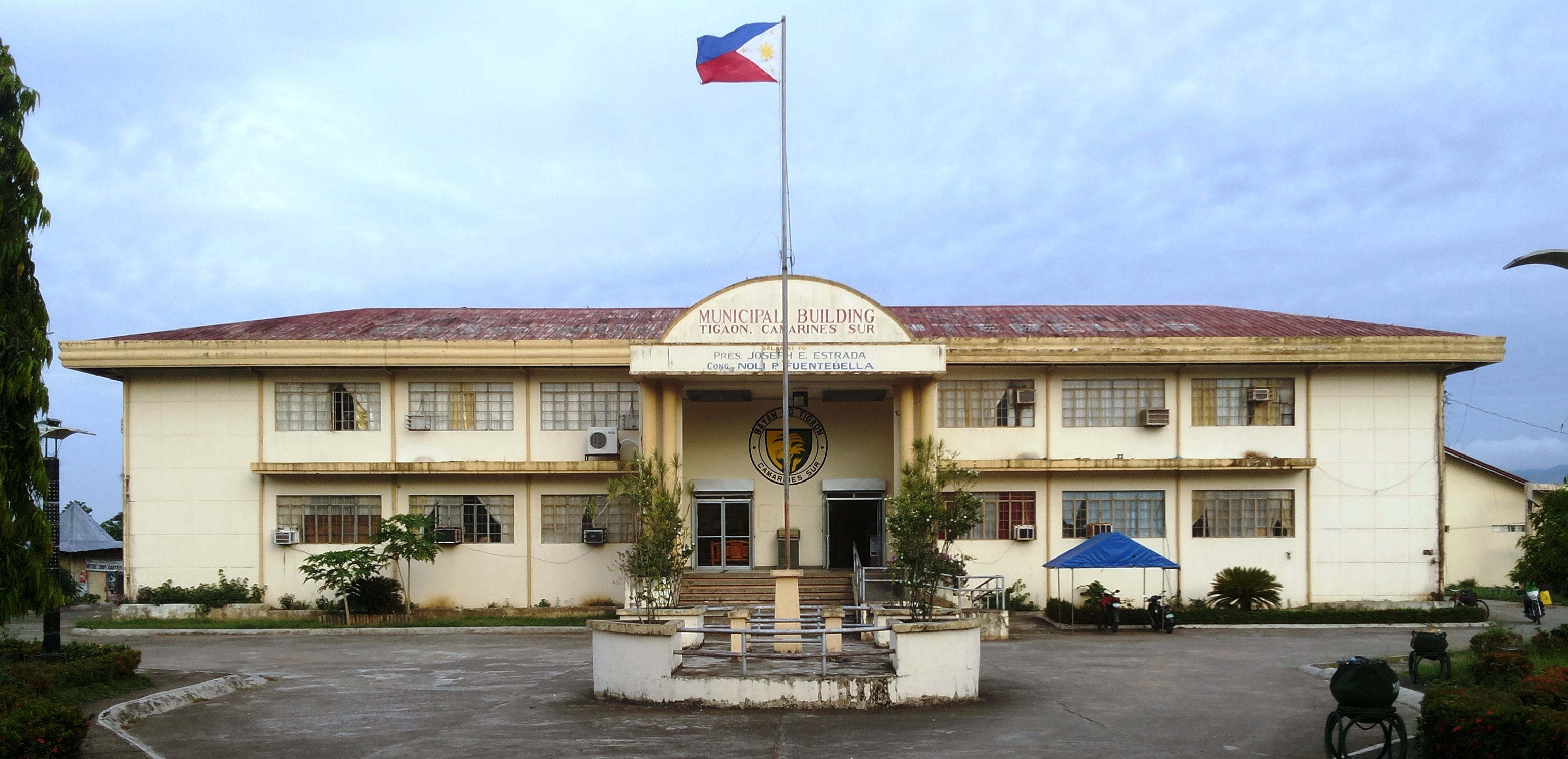
Tigaon municipal hall

Population census of Tigaon

Year	Pop.	±% p.a.
1903	5,711	—
1918	7,418	+1.76%
1939	10,039	+1.45%
1948	16,912	+5.97%
1960	20,337	+1.55%
1970	20,224	−0.06%
1975	25,282	+4.58%
1980	26,504	+0.95%

Year	Pop.	±% p.a.
1990	33,650	+2.42%
1995	39,186	+2.89%
2000	40,210	+0.55%
2007	45,509	+1.72%
2010	48,611	+2.43%
2015	55,272	+2.48%
2020	60,524	+1.93%
2024	61,790	+0.50%

Source: Philippine Statistics Authority

In the 2024 census, the population of Tigaon was 61,790 people, with a density of 850 inhabitants per square kilometre or 2,200 inhabitants per square mile.

=== Language ===
In 2010, UNESCO released its 3rd world volume of Endangered Languages in the World, where three critically endangered languages were in the Philippines. One of these languages is the Isarog Agta language, which has an estimated speaker of five people in the year 2000. The language was classified as critically endangered, meaning the youngest speakers are grandparents and older, and they speak the language partially and infrequently and hardly pass the language to their children and grandchildren anymore. If the remaining 150 people do not pass their native language to the next generation of Isarog Agta people, their indigenous language will be extinct within a period of one to two decades.

The Isarog Agta people live within the circumference of Mount Isarog, though only five of them still know their indigenous language. They are one of the original Negrito settlers in the entire Philippines. They belong to the Aeta people classification but have distinct language and belief systems unique to their own culture and heritage.

=== Religion ===
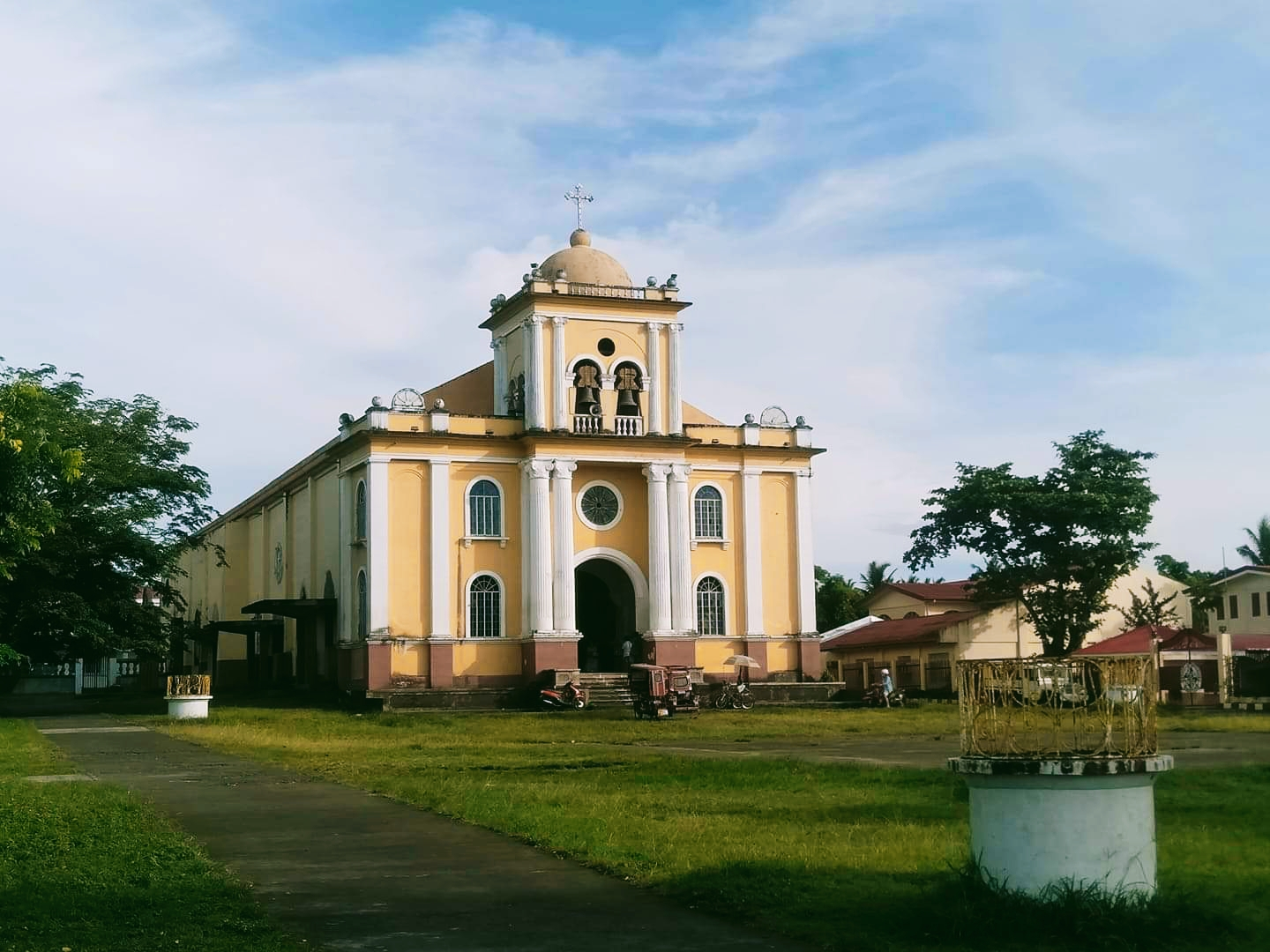
St. Claire of Assisi Parish Church

Roman Catholicism first emerged in 1794 with the birth of its town. Now, there are four parishes in Tigaon.

- St. Claire of Assisi Parish - The oldest parish. Established in 1794. It is located in Aguinaldo St., Tigaon.
- Parish of St. Catherine of Siena is located beside Siena College Tigaon (Ginaroy Campus) on Gingaroy, Tigaon.
- St. Raphael the Archangel Parish is the parish located at San Rafael, Tigaon.
- Parish of Our Lady of Sorrows - the newest parish, located at Abo, Tigaon.

Presence of Protestant churches are seen in Tigaon, particularly in the streets of Baranggay Talojongon,

Presently, the Protestant churches in Tigaon are:

- Members Church of God International (Ang Dating Daan)
- Seventh Day Adventist
- The Church of Jesus Christ of Latter-Day Saints
- Jehovah's Witnesses
- Jesus Miracle Crusade
- Iglesia Ni Cristo
- United Church of Christ in the Philippines
- Jesus the Loving Shepherd Christian Fellowship
- A group of Born-Again Christians

== Economy ==
Poverty incidence of Tigaon (%)

Source: Philippine Statistics Authority

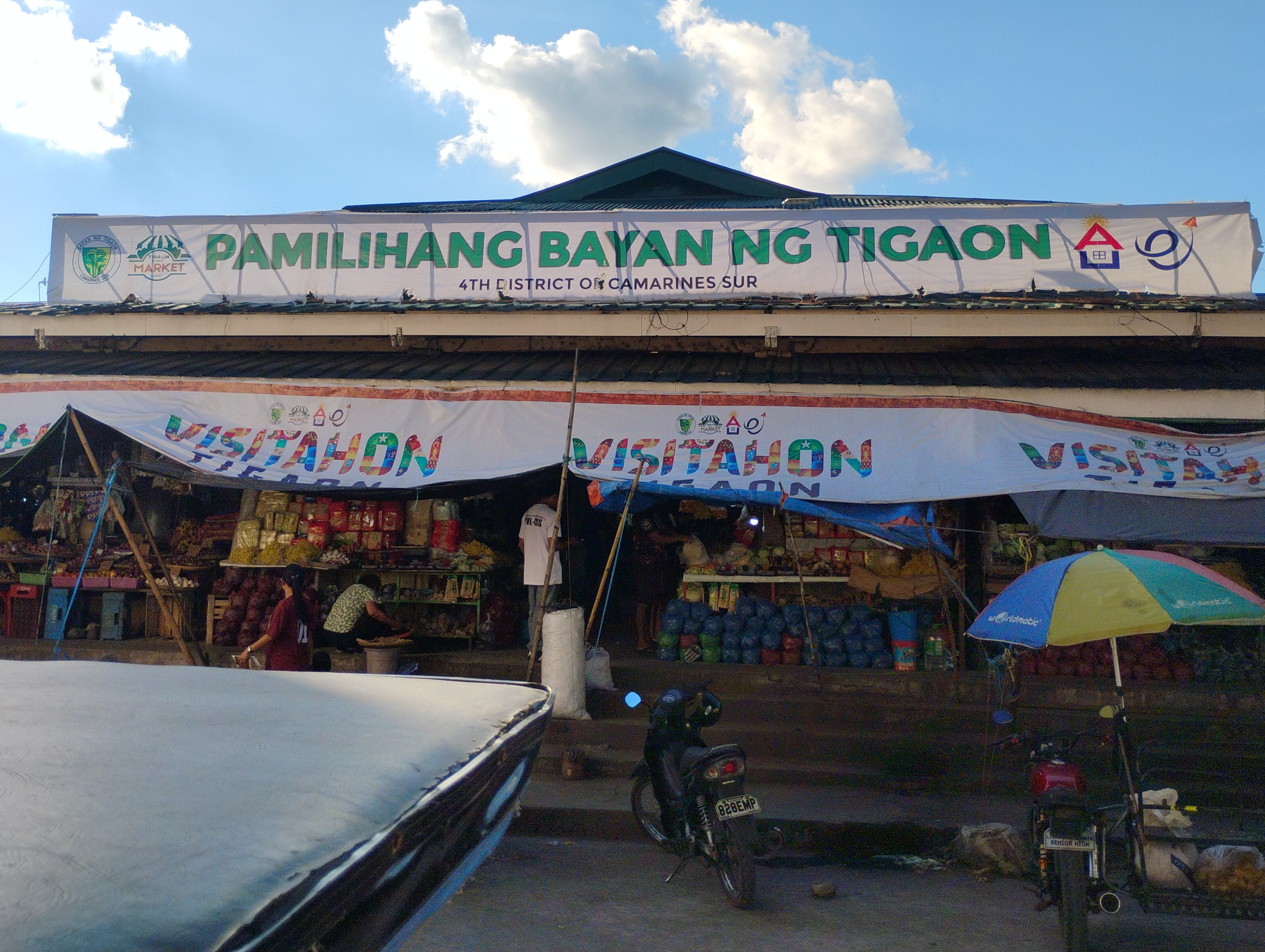
Tigaon Public Market

Tigaon's economy is based on agricultural products like rice, corn, sugar cane, abaca fiber, fish, and pork. It is also known for its cottage industry, especially high-quality ships-in-bottles. The main tourist attractions are the Mt. Isarog Jungle Park at Barangay Concocep and several beach resorts.

Commercial establishments include open market, banks, pawnshops, hardware stores, self-service supermarkets, drug stores, food chains and restaurants, pension house. Tigaon is also home to a slaughterhouse and information technology centers.

Local products include palay, corn, root crops, sugarcane, coconut, citrus, vegetables, fish and other marine products, livestock and poultry products are also available.

Despite being the administrative seat of Partido it still is one of the Top 5 poorest municipalities in Camarines Sur and is one of the slowest progressing too.

CASURECO IV with its main office in Tigaon supplies power requirement in all Partido towns.

== Government ==
Municipal mayors were: Roman de Leon, Jr. (OIC, 1987, Transitional Gov’t); and Eleanor R. Lelis (1988−1992). Arnulfo Fuentebella, elected in 1992, held the congressional seat for Camarines Sur's third district. Some of the town's parish priests were Fr. Alfonso Grageda (1985−1991) and Fr. Eutiquio Infante (1991−1997).

Municipal Mayor Mariano B. Llaguno (1992−1998) was succeeded by Mayor Elmo L. Bombase while Fr. Danilo Tuason became Parish Priest of Tigaon. Hand in hand with the construction of the Parish rectory was Tigaon's new municipal building. After a nine-year term, Mayor Bombase was succeeded by Mayor Arnie Fuentebella (2007–present). The Rev. Msgr. Juan Celzo, Fr. Rodolfo Sales and incumbent parish priest Fr. Noel Emmanuel Alforte were assigned successively to continue the church's mission in Tigaon.

== Tourism ==
Tourist destinations include the Hibiscus, Consocep Mountain Resort, beach resorts in Barangays Casuna and Ranso, and the Kawa-kawa, Tumaguiti and Bulalakaw waterfalls.

== Transportation ==
There is a total of 71.456 kilometres (44.401 mi) of road classified as National, Provincial, Municipal and Barangay roads.

Presence of a bus terminal where air-conditioned as well as ordinary buses have regular trips to Manila and other provincial key cities and other light air-conditioned vehicles available for hire.

== Education ==
The Tigaon Schools District Office governs all educational institutions within the municipality. It oversees the management and operations of all private and public, from primary to secondary schools.

Tigaon has currently has 23 elementary schools, one for each barangay, 7 high schools and 4 colleges.

=== Primary and elementary schools ===
- Abo Elementary School
- Caraycayon Elementary School
- Casuna Elementary School
- Consosep Elementary School
- Coyaoyao Elementary School
- Don Tomas Garchitorena Elementary School
- Eulalia Elementary School
- Gaao Elementary School
- Gingaroy Elementary School
- Huyonhuyon Elementary School
- Juanita Clerigo Elementary School
- Libod Elementary School
- Mabalodbalod Elementary School
- May-Anao Elementary School
- Panagan Elementary School
- Salvacion Elementary School
- San Antonio Elementary School
- San Miguel Elementary School
- San Rafael Elementary School
- Tigaon Central Pilot School
- Tigaon North Central School
- Tinawagan Elementary School
- Vinagre Elementary School

=== Secondary schools ===
- Cabalinadan High School
- Dr. Rodolfo V. Pamor Jr. Memorial National High School
- Genesis Colleges Inc. - Tigaon Branch
- Huyonhuyon High School
- La Salvacion National High School
- Partido Agro-Industrial National High School
- Partido Mission Academy
- San Rafael National High School
- Tinawagan National High School

=== Higher educational institutions ===
- Lower Isarog Foundation Exponent
- Shepherdville College (formerly Jesus the Loving Shepherd Christian College)
- Siena College Tigaon (formerly Santa Clara College)

== Notable personalities ==
- Andrés Garchitorena, Spanish businessman, revolutionary member, and Governor
- Anjo Yllana, Filipino actor-comedian, television host, and politician.
- Francis Garchitorena, Filipino judge
- Jomari Yllana, Filipino actor, model, racing driver, concert producer, promoter, and politician
- José Manuel Stilianopoulos, Philippine ambassador to Britain
- Mariano Garchitorena, Filipino politician of Spanish-French descent, Governor, and Secretary of Agriculture and Commerce
