= José Fuentebella =

Filipino lawyer and politician (1883–1982)

The Honorable José T. Fuentebella
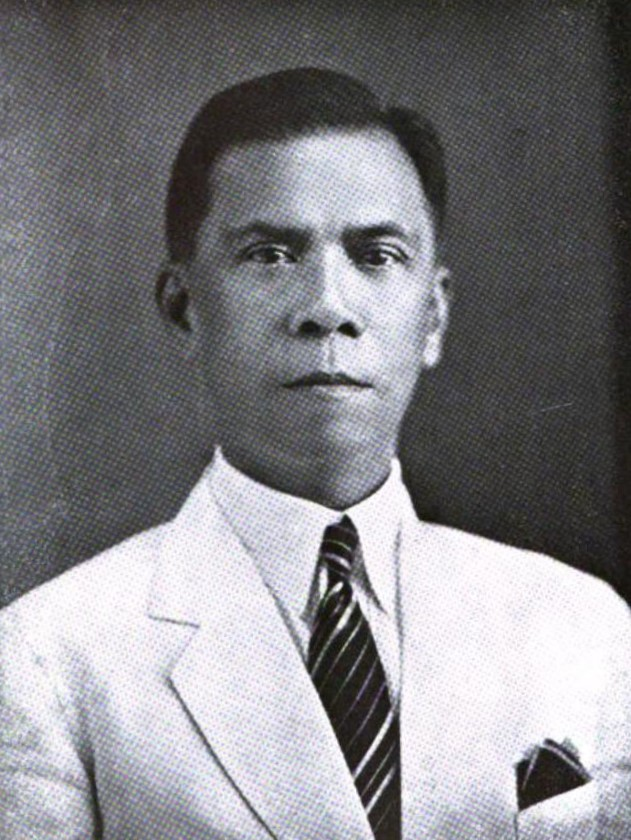
- Photograph from The Commercial & Industrial Manual of the Philippines, 1941

Senator of the Philippines from the 6th district
- In office 1928–1934 Serving with José O. Vera
- Preceded by: Juan B. Alegre
- Succeeded by: Domingo Imperial
- In office 1916
- Refused to take office (Note: He was elected as a Senator in 1916 but immediately went to private practice and look after his family's financial interests.)

Member of the National Assembly from Camarines Sur's at-large district
- In office September 25, 1943 – February 2, 1944 Serving with Andres Hernandez

Member of the Philippine Assembly from Ambos Camarines's 3rd district
- In office 1909–1916
- Preceded by: Francisco Alvarez
- Succeeded by: Sulpicio V. Cea

Governor of Ambos Camarines
- In office 1916–1916
- Preceded by: Mariano Fuentebella
- Succeeded by: Manuel Crescini

Member of the House of Representatives of the Philippines from Camarines Sur's 2nd district
- In office June 11, 1945 – May 25, 1946
- Preceded by: Vacant
- Succeeded by: Sebastián C. Moll Jr.

Member of the National Assembly from Camarines Sur's 2nd district
- In office May 25, 1937 – December 30, 1941
- Preceded by: Luis N. De Leon
- Succeeded by: Vacant
- President: José P. Laurel

Commissioner of the 5th Military District
- In office September 1943 – December 1944

Philippine Ambassador to Indonesia
- In office 1955–1961
- President: Ramon Magsaysay

Presidential Adviser on Foreign Affairs
- President: Ferdinand E. Marcos

Personal details
- Born: José Fuentebella y Tría; June 17, 1883 Sagñay, Ambos Camarines, Captaincy General of the Philippines
- Died: July 25, 1982 (aged 99)
- Party: Nacionalista (1909-1942; 1945-1982)
- Other political affiliations: KALIBAPI (1942-1945)
- Education: Colegio de San Buenaventura (Albay); Ateneo de Manila; Escuela de Leyes
- Occupation: Politician (senator, congressman, commissioner, governor and ambassador)
- Profession: Lawyer

José Tría Fuentebella (June 17, 1883 – July 25, 1982), widely known as "Pepe", was a Filipino lawyer and politician. He is the first Fuentebella to foray into the national arena of politics.

== Early life and education ==
Fuentebella studied at Colegio de San Buenaventura in Albay. He finished his Bachelor of Arts in Ateneo de Manila in 1902, obtained his Bachelor of Laws from Escuela de Leyes in 1905 and passed the bar in 1906. José practiced law for three years before entering politics at the age of 26.

== Political career ==
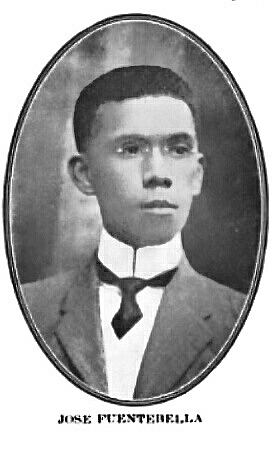
Fuentebella depicted in a publication of Philippine Education, published April 1917

He was elected representative of Ambos Camarines's 3rd district for the Second Philippine Legislature in 1909. He also served in the Third Philippine Legislature until 1916.

He convinced his father, Mariano Fuentebella, to run for governor of Ambos Camarines in 1912. Together they formed a powerful tandem and were able to obtain benefits for the province from the colonial government. When his father died, although he was in a higher office as a representative, José accepted the appointment as governor to finish his father's term and implement their joint projects.

Fuentebella ran for senator and was later proclaimed Senator-elect in 1916 for the 6th senatorial district. However, he declined to sit as he immediately went to private practice and look after his family's financial interests instead. But in 1931, he made his return to the Senate as a 6th district senator in 1928 and served two terms (1928-1931 and 1931–1934).

The Senate was abolished in 1935. In the legislative polls later that year, Fuentebella won a seat in the unicameral National Assembly and served two terms until 1941.

Although the Senate was restored in 1941, Fuentebella ran for a seat in the Lower House in the November polls. However, the 1st Congress of the Commonwealth of the Philippines did not seat until 1945 as World War II came to the Philippines.

During the Japanese occupation, from September 1943 to December 1944, Fuentebella was appointed Commissioner of the 5th Military District comprising the entire Bicol Region. After consulting guerilla leaders, he accepted the appointment from the Laurel government reluctantly and only to prevent more Japanese atrocities. He was also elected as an assemblyman to National Assembly in 1943.

After the war, he finished his term as representative and successfully defended himself from accusations that he had collaborated with the Japanese.

Fuentebella was appointed Philippine Ambassador to Indonesia by then Philippine President Ramon Magsaysay on March 31, 1955. He exercised deft democracy from 1955 to 1961, a crucial time in Philippine and Indonesian relations. Subsequently, Philippine President Ferdinand E. Marcos appointed him Presidential Adviser on Foreign Affairs.

Fuentebella was an ardent nationalist and founder of the Nacionalista Party in Bicol. He became president of the party in Camarines Sur from 1909 to 1955. He is one who espoused the "Filipino First" policy of then Philippine President Carlos Garcia. One of his greatest achievements as a politician was the extension of the Philippine National Railways to Bicol, establishing Camarines Sur Polytechnic Colleges in Naga City, and being the author of the "Flag Law".

== Death ==
He died on July 25, 1982.

== Legacy ==
The Governor Jose T. Fuentebella National Highway was named after him through Republic Act No. 7786 on August 8, 1994.
