= Ambos Camarines =

Former province of the Philippines

Ambos Camarines Camarines
- Province of the Philippines
- 1579–1829; 1854–1857; 1893–1919
- Location of the historical province of Ambos Camarines.
- Capital: Nueva Caceres
- Historical era: Spanish Colonial Period; American Colonial Period
  - Established: 1579
  - First reunification: 1854–1857
  - Second reunification: 1893–1917
  - Disestablished: 1919
Preceded by	Succeeded by
Ibalon	Camarines Norte; Camarines Sur
- Today part of: · Camarines Norte · Camarines Sur · Albay; De facto ·

Ambos Camarines (Spanish: ambos, meaning "both"; commonly known as Camarines), officially the Province of Ambos Camarines, was a historical province in the Philippines found on the northern end of the Bicol Peninsula. It now exists as two separate provinces—Camarines Norte (North) and Camarines Sur (South).

The province was founded in 1579 and was split into two, Camarines Norte and Sur in 1829. They were reunited under the province Ambos Camarines in 1854, but was separated again after three years. In 1893, they were reunited until March 10, 1917, when Act No. 2711 formed most of the present-day provinces, including Camarines Norte and Camarines Sur.

== History ==
=== Creation ===
In 1569, Luis Enríquez de Guzmán, with Augustinian friar Alonzo Jiménez, reached the present town of Camalig, which was a former ranchería. They found the townsfolk living in thatched houses called kamaligs (rice granaries). Andrez de Ibarra, while in search of provisions, followed the route taken by de Guzmán and reached Kalilingo and Búa (the present towns of Bato and Nabua) in 1570.

In 1573, Miguel López de Legazpi dispatched his grandson Juan de Salcedo to explore the region as far as Paracale in search of gold and other precious stones. A year later, Salcedo cruised the Bicol River and reached Bato Lake. Hence, the first recorded account of the discovery of the place.

In 1574, at the height of the Spanish colonization of the islands, Governor-General Guido de Lavezaris mentioned in his letter to the King of Spain, the land of Los Camarines – apparently referring to the area of what is now Camalig, Albay. It is a place where rice storehouses and granaries or camarin abound. Thus, the name "Camarines" was coined and somehow stuck. Spanish colonizers later denominated the area into two distinct regions.

Later, a Spanish garrison under Captain Pedro de Chávez was set up in present-day Naga, a prosperous ranchería. In 1575, de Guzmán founded the City of Nueva Cáceres (present-day city of Naga) named after the birthplace of Governor-General Francisco de Sande in Cáceres, Spain.

On May 27, 1579, Governor-General de Sande issued a decree which led to the establishment of a settlement in Camarines where Spanish colonists were urged to reside.

In 1636, Ibalon was split into two: Partido de Ibalon (comprising what is now Albay, Catanduanes, Sorsogon, Masbate, and the islands of Ticao and Burias) and Partido de Camarines (all towns north of present-day Camalig, Albay). By the end of the 1700s, Camarines had 19,686 native families and 154 Spanish Filipino families. By the 1818 census, there were 527 Spanish-Filipino families in the province of Camarines. Specifically the settlements in Partido de la Contra Costa (Camarines Norte), contained the following number of Spanish-Filipino families as well as their residences: 54 at Paracale, 6 at Indan, 2 at Talisay (Including 2 Lacandulas), and 26 at Daet. Whereas Camarines Sur occupied all lands to the south of Camarines Norte which once belonged to undivided Camarines, of which the number of Spanish-Filipino families and their residences are as follows: 59 at Camalig, 24 at Ligao, 15 at Polangui, and 1 at Libon; all being under the Partido de Iriga, then; 10 at Buhi, 2 at Nabua, and 57 at Bao; all being under the Partido de la Binconada, and finally; 2 in San Fernando, 7 in Milaor, 1 in Libmanan, and 301 Spanish-Filipino families in Nueva Caceres, or modern day Naga City.

=== Ambos Camarines ===
Partido de Camarines was further divided into Camarines Sur and Norte in 1829. From 1864 until 1893, Camarines Norte and Sur (collectively called Ambos Camarines) underwent a series of confusing geo-political division, fusion, re-division, and re-fusion, until in 1919 when the first Philippine Legislature finally separated Norte and Sur into two provinces. Camarines Norte's capital is Daet while Camarines Sur's capital town was Naga, the city once called "Nueva Cáceres" – namesake of a province in Spain and among the original five royal cities of the colony.

The Philippine Revolution started in Ambos Camarines on September 17, 1898, when Elías Ángeles and Félix Plazo, Filipino corporals in the Spanish Army, sided with revolutionists and fought the local Spanish forces. With the arrival of General Vicente Lucbán, the revolutionary government in Bicol was established.

American forces occupied the Bicol Peninsula in January 1900. In March of the same year, General John M. Bell was made military governor of Southern Luzon. Civil government was finally established in Ambos Camarines in April 1901.

In March 1919, the Philippine Legislature issued an Act authorizing the Governor General to partition the province into Camarines Norte and Camarines Sur.

On April 15, 1920, Camarines Sur and Camarines Norte was created from Ambos Camarines.

=== Present ===
Naga City was the capital of Camarines Sur until June 6, 1955, when Pili, the adjoining town, was declared the Provincial Capital by virtue of R. A. 1336. The province celebrated its foundation anniversary, the 419th, for the very first time on May 27, 1998.

== See also ==
- Legislative districts of Ambos Camarines
