= Bula, Camarines Sur =

Municipality in Camarines Sur, Philippines

Bula
- Municipality
- Municipality of Bula
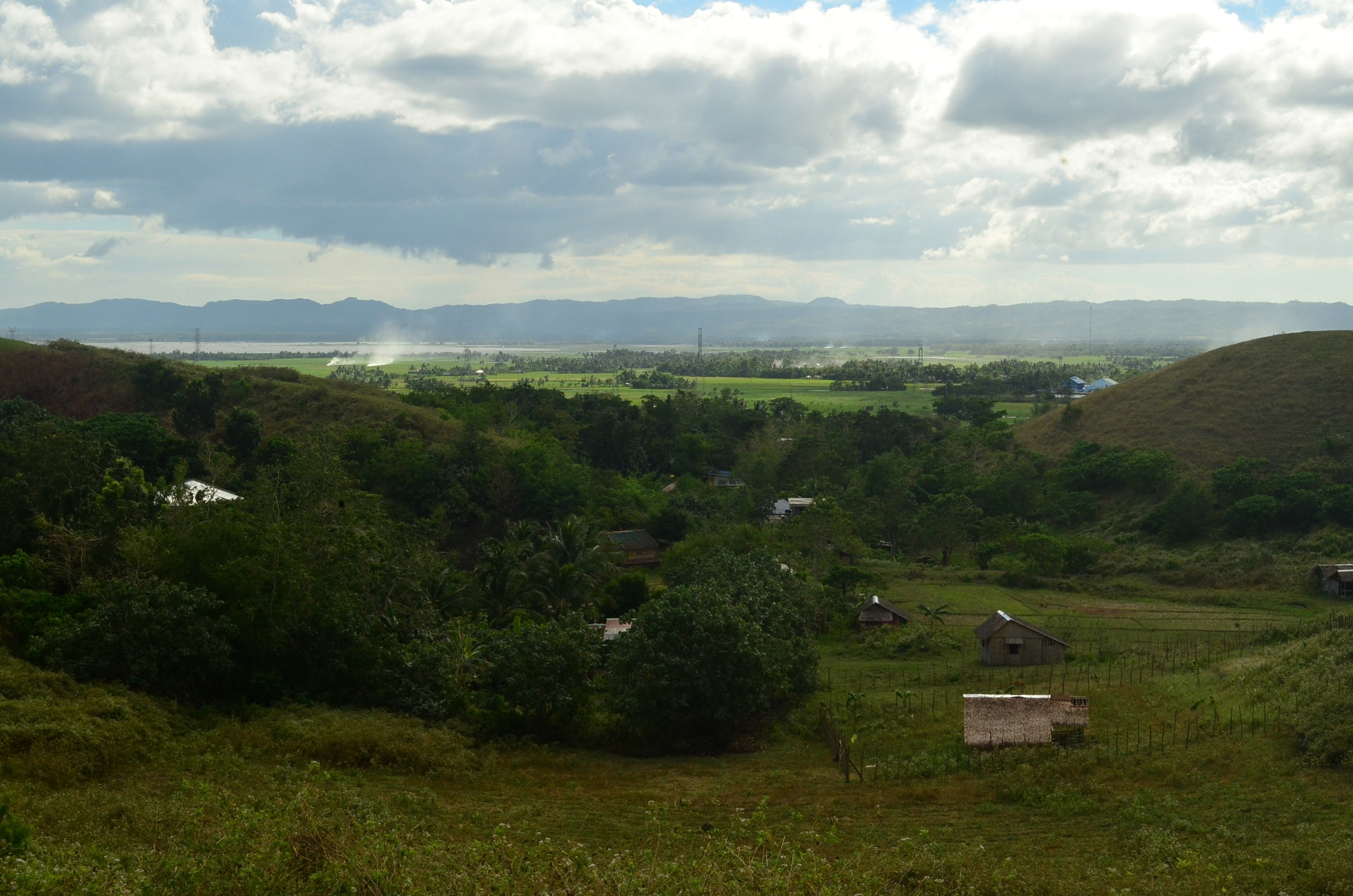
- A view of native houses in Bula

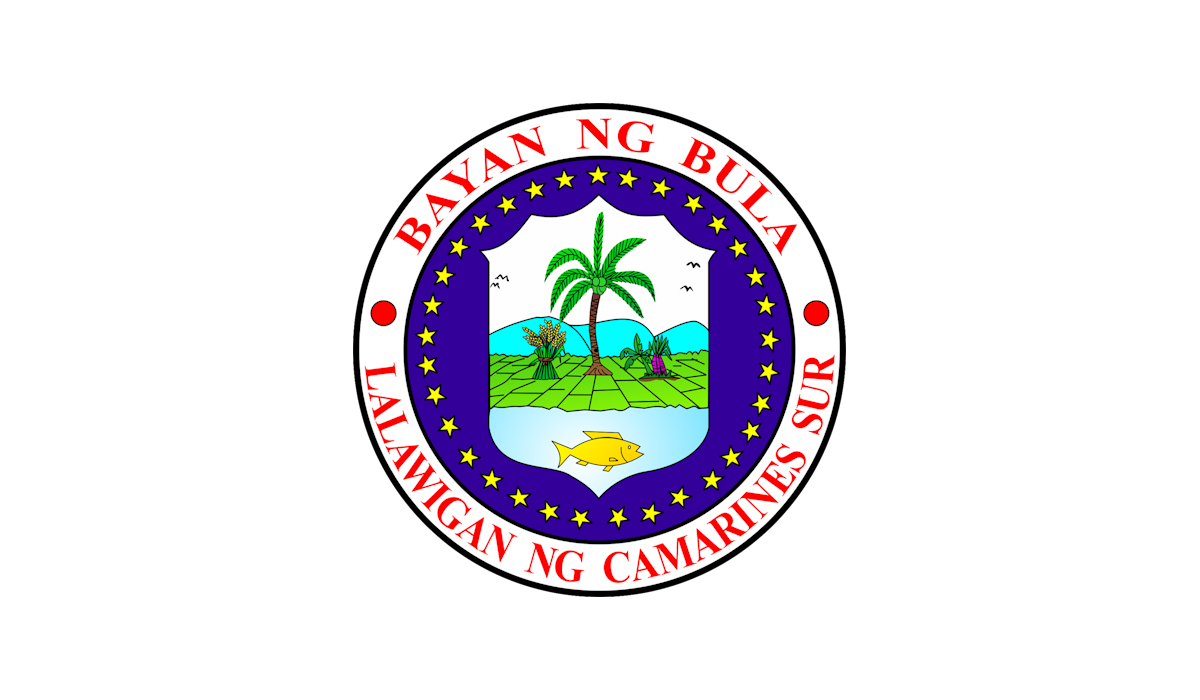
- Flag Seal
- Anthem: Tan-aw Bula
- Map of Camarines Sur with Bula highlighted
- Interactive map of Bula
- Location within the Philippines
- Coordinates: 13°28′10″N 123°16′39″E
- Country: Philippines
- Region: Bicol Region
- Province: Camarines Sur
- District: 5th district
- Barangays: 33 (see Barangays)

Government
  - Type: Sangguniang Bayan
  - Mayor: Manuel A. Ibasco Jr.
  - Vice Mayor: Nellie P. Largo
  - Representative: Miguel Luis R. Villafuerte
  - Municipal Council: Members: Joel O. Caya; Glenda B. Espiritu; Edna Z. Mora; Sherlyn Joy R. Hombre; Ma. France Merced S. Sedilla; Gregorio L. Pontanal; Ely A. Soreta; Pablo R. Almazan Jr.
  - Electorate: 46,508 voters (2025)

Area
  - Total: 167.64 km^{2} (64.73 sq mi)
- Elevation: 24 m (79 ft)
- Highest elevation: 263 m (863 ft)
- Lowest elevation: 0 m (0 ft)

Population (2024 census)
  - Total: 75,943
  - Density: 453.01/km^{2} (1,173.3/sq mi)
  - Households: 15,468

Economy
  - Income class: 1st municipal income class
  - Poverty incidence: 31.74% (2023)
  - Revenue: ₱ 288.3 million (2024)
  - Assets: ₱ 905.8 million (2024)
  - Expenditure: ₱ 274.5 million (2024)
  - Liabilities: ₱ 199.1 million (2024)

Service provider
  - Electricity: Camarines Sur 3 Electric Cooperative (CASURECO 3)
- Time zone: UTC+8 (PST)
- ZIP code: 4430
- PSGC: 0501706000
- IDD : area code: +63 (0)54
- Native languages: Rinconada Bikol; Central Bikol; Tagalog
- Website: municipalityofbula.gov.ph

Bula, officially the Municipality of Bula (Rinconada Bikol: Banwaān ka Bula; Tagalog: Bayan ng Bula), is a municipality in the province of Camarines Sur, Philippines. According to the 2024 census, it has a population of 75,943 people.

== History ==
The town of Bula is historically considered one of the first four mission towns of Camarines Sur founded by the Spanish conquistadores when they set foot on the Bicol soil coming from the Visayas in 1576. The other premier towns were Naga, Quipayo (Note: Established in 1578, Quipayo (is now modern-day Calabanga) was only a barrio.) and Nabua.

The Spaniards who first came to this place asked the men who were splitting bamboo about the name of the area, and since they did not understand the language, they thought they were being asked about the name of the bamboo, so they got the answer "Bu-la." And so Bula became the name of the town.

However, it was only in 1578 when the natives were Christianized, so the National Historical Commission dates back the town's history to 1578. From this, the town chose St. Mary Magdalene as its patron saint and celebrated its fiesta every 22nd day of July, which is the birthdate of the saint.

The original location of Bula's town proper was located in the now Barangay Ombao Polpog. The location had to be changed due to the town proper's isolation from other Rinconada city centers.

== Geography ==
Bula is bounded on the north by the municipalities of Pili and Ocampo, on the east by the municipality of Baao, on the southeast by the Municipality of Nabua, on the south it is bounded by the Municipality of Balatan, on the southwest by Ragay Gulf, and on the west by the Municipality of Minalabac.

=== Barangays ===
Bula is politically subdivided into 33 barangays. Each barangay consists of puroks and some have sitios.

- Bagoladio
- Bagumbayan
- Balaogan
- Caorasan
- Casugad
- Causip
- Fabrica
- Inoyonan
- Itangon
- Kinalabasahan
- La Purisima
- La Victoria
- Lanipga
- Lubgan
- Ombao Heights
- Ombao Polpog
- Palsong
- Panoypoyan
- Pawili
- Sagrada (Sagrada Familia)
- Salvacion (Poblacion)
- San Agustin
- San Francisco
- San Isidro
- San Jose
- San Miguel
- San Ramon
- San Roque (Poblacion)
- San Roque Heights
- Santa Elena
- Santo Domingo
- Santo Niño
- Taisan

=== Climate ===
Climate data for Bula, Camarines Sur
| Month | Jan | Feb | Mar | Apr | May | Jun | Jul | Aug | Sep | Oct | Nov | Dec | Year |
|---|---|---|---|---|---|---|---|---|---|---|---|---|---|
| Mean daily maximum °C (°F) | 33 (91) | 32 (90) | 36 (97) | 37 (99) | 38 (100) | 37 (99) | 35 (95) | 33 (91) | 35 (95) | 34 (93) | 33 (91) | 32 (90) | 35 (94) |
| Mean daily minimum °C (°F) | 27 (81) | 27 (81) | 29 (84) | 31 (88) | 32 (90) | 32 (90) | 31 (88) | 29 (84) | 30 (86) | 29 (84) | 28 (82) | 28 (82) | 29 (85) |
| Average precipitation mm (inches) | 36.63 (1.44) | 49.6 (1.95) | 46.66 (1.84) | 78.81 (3.10) | 93.81 (3.69) | 135.51 (5.34) | 326.31 (12.85) | 406.1 (15.99) | 214.85 (8.46) | 313.98 (12.36) | 76.2 (3.00) | 262 (10.3) | 2,040.46 (80.32) |
| Average rainy days | 19 | 23 | 17 | 19 | 23 | 27 | 31 | 29 | 27 | 29 | 24 | 29 | 297 |
Source: World Weather Online

== Demographics ==
Population census of Bula
| Year | Pop. | ±% p.a. |
|---|---|---|
| 1903 | 2,859 | — |
| 1918 | 5,346 | +4.26% |
| 1939 | 11,750 | +3.82% |
| 1948 | 11,952 | +0.19% |
| 1960 | 24,257 | +6.07% |
| 1970 | 31,506 | +2.65% |
| 1975 | 36,904 | +3.22% |
| 1980 | 40,642 | +1.95% |
| 1990 | 48,240 | +1.73% |
| 1995 | 54,650 | +2.37% |
| 2000 | 57,474 | +1.09% |
| 2007 | 62,024 | +1.06% |
| 2010 | 68,011 | +3.41% |
| 2015 | 69,430 | +0.39% |
| 2020 | 73,143 | +1.10% |
| 2024 | 75,943 | +0.91% |
Source: Philippine Statistics Authority

In the 2024 census, the population of Bula was 75,943 people, with a density of 440 inhabitants per square kilometre or 1,100 inhabitants per square mile.

=== Language ===
Majority of the people speak the Bula-Pili variant, a lowland dialect (sinaranəw) of Rinconada Bikol language, also known as Riŋkonāda. The population can also understand and speak Tagalog or Filipino language and English.

=== Religion ===
Majority of the population are Roman Catholic members which is the biggest bulk of Bulaeños adhering to Christian faith. The rest of population are followers of different Protestant denominations.

== Economy ==
Poverty incidence of Bula (%)

Source: Philippine Statistics Authority

Despite staying as a 2nd class municipality, there have been improvements brought along by the Local Government Unit from the mid-2010s to the present to the year. This is because some areas need improvement of infrastructures. This also makes Bula a 1st class municipality.

Bula was formerly included in the Metro Naga area before the designation was discontinued in 2017.

=== Commercial and Industrial ===
Commercial and Industrial are focused in the Centro part of the town situated in Sagrada. At the start of the 2020s, Micro Businesses in the town bloomed — recent developments such as the Palmeda Transcend Park in Brgy. Sagrada Familia acts as a center for Micro and franchise businesses.

=== Agriculture ===
The agricultural output of Bula mainly consists of rice, wheat, coconut, and corn.

== Tourism ==
The town of Bula has views of Tan-Awan Park, Nalalata Falls, and Burabod. Tan-Awan Park, located in Barangay Bagoladio atop a hill, attracts a number of tourists because of its views overlooking the areas of its neighboring towns in Rinconada.

Bula is also home to beaches on its easternmost side, neighboring Minalabac in the north and Balatan to the south.

== Education ==
The Bula Schools District Office governs all educational institutions within the municipality. It oversees the management and operations of all private and public, from primary to secondary schools.

=== Primary and elementary schools ===
- Anayan Elementary School
- Archangel Saint Michael Academy
- Bagoladio Elementary School
- Bagumbayan Elementary School
- Balaogan Elementary School
- Bula Central School
- Bula Parochial School
- Bula South Central School
- Carbeth Victory Academy
- Caorasan Elementary School
- Casugad Elementary School
- Catasan Elementary School
- Causip Elementary School
- Chamsomang Christian School
- Fabrica Elementary School
- Felipe P. Panton Elementary School
- Itangon Elementary School
- Kaibigan Child Center Foundation
- Kinalabasahan Elementary School
- La Purisima Elementary School
- La Victoria Elementary School
- Lanipga Elementary School
- Lopez Palsong Elementary School
- Lubgan Elementary School
- Macalinao Elementary School
- Ninoy Aquino Elementary School
- Ombao (P) Elementary School
- Ombao Heights Elementary School
- Panoypoyan Elementary School
- Romero Elementary School
- Salles Elementary School
- San Agustin Elementary School
- San Francisco Elementary School
- San Jose Elementary School
- San Ramon Elementary School
- Sta. Elena Elementary School
- Sto. Domingo Elementary School
- Taisan Elementary School

=== Secondary schools ===
- Balaogan National High School
- Bula National High School
- Bula National High School - Caorasan Annex National High School
- Casugad National High School
- Fabrica High School
- Felipe P. Panthon High School
- La Victoria High School (Fabrica National High School Annex)
- Mother Theresa Colegio De Bula
- Ombao National High School
- Palsong National High School
- San Ramon High School
- Sto. Nino Integrated School

== Gallery ==
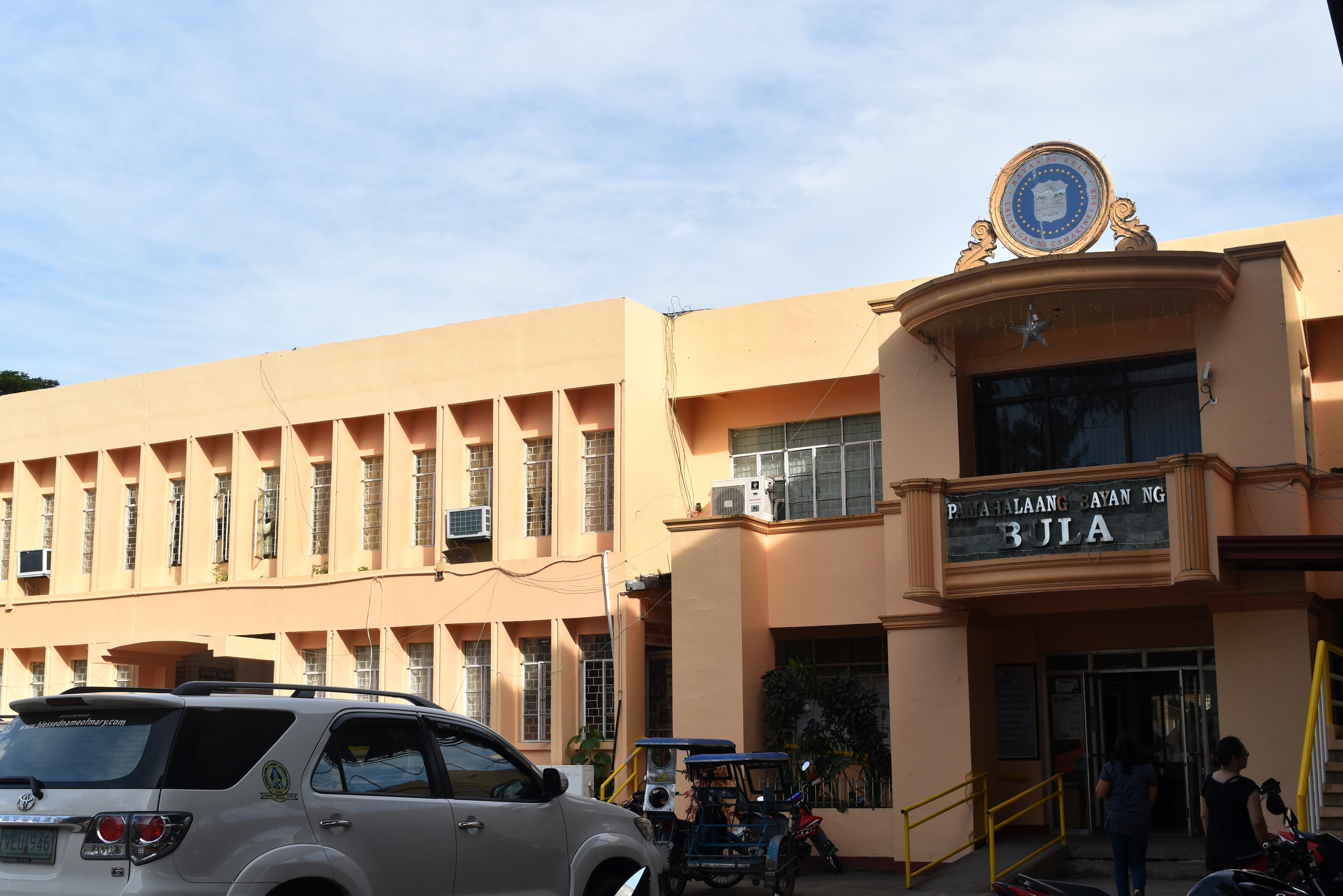
Bula Municipal Building

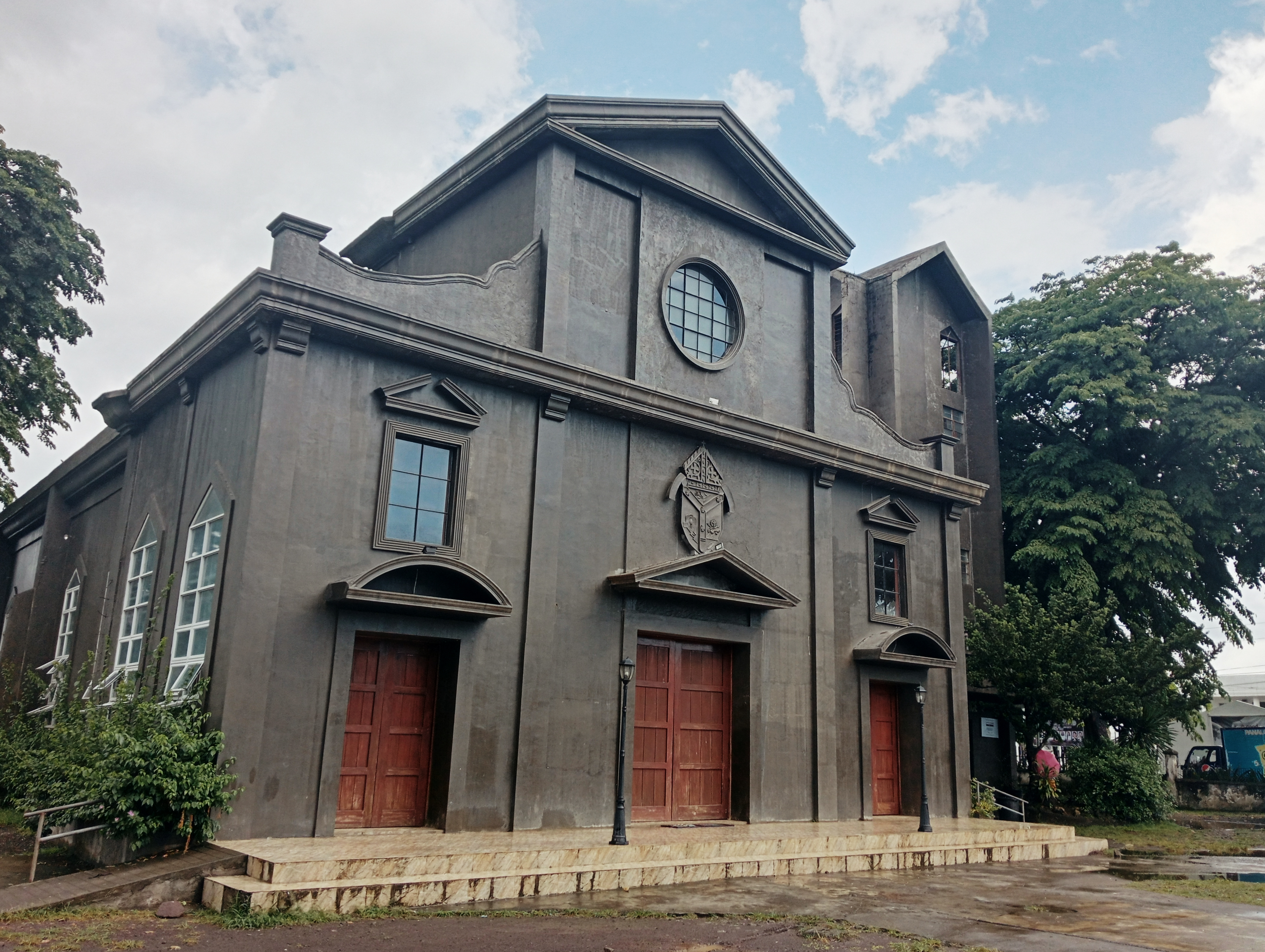
St. Mary Magdalene Parish Church

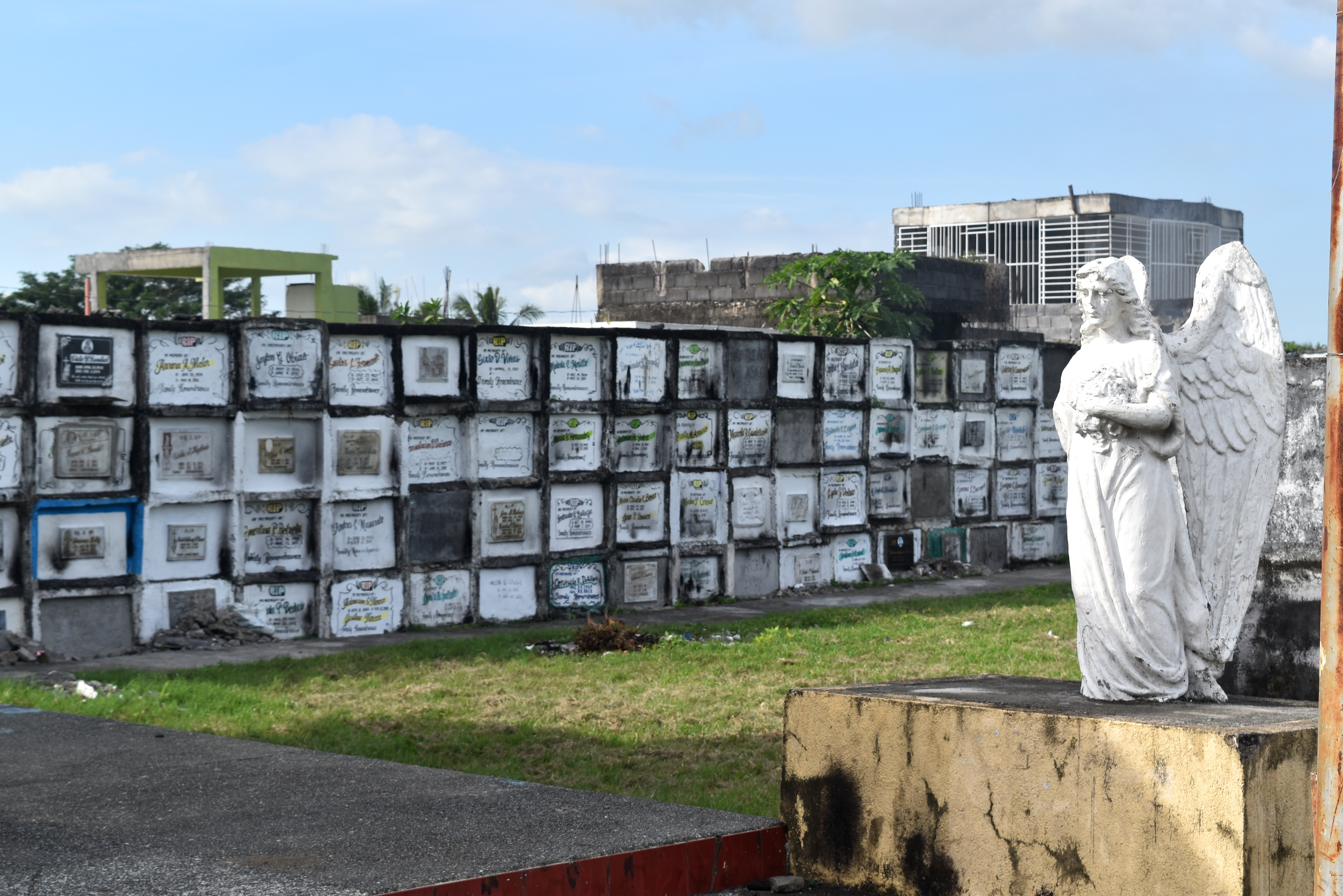
Bula Catholic Cemetery

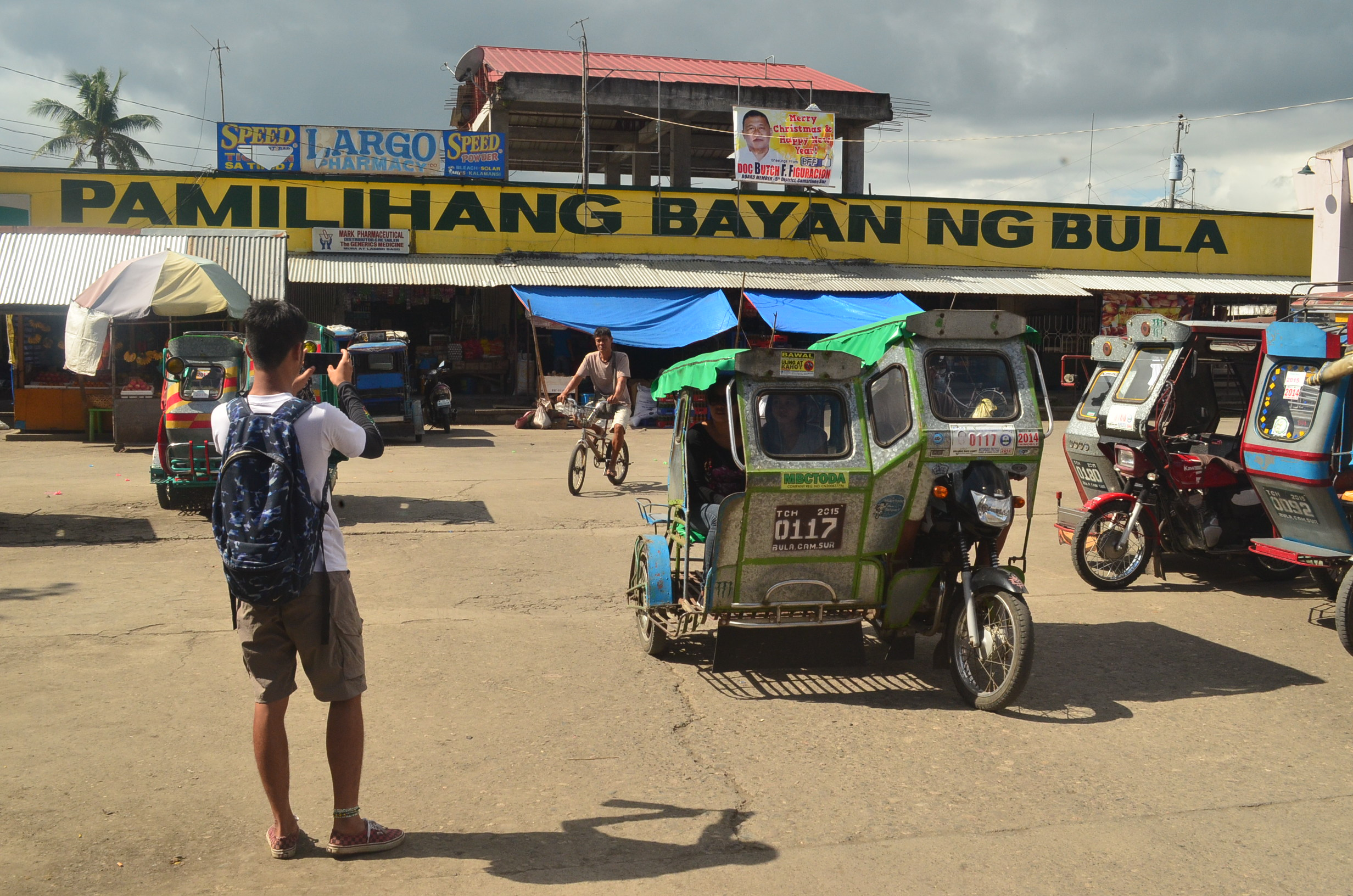
Bula Public Market

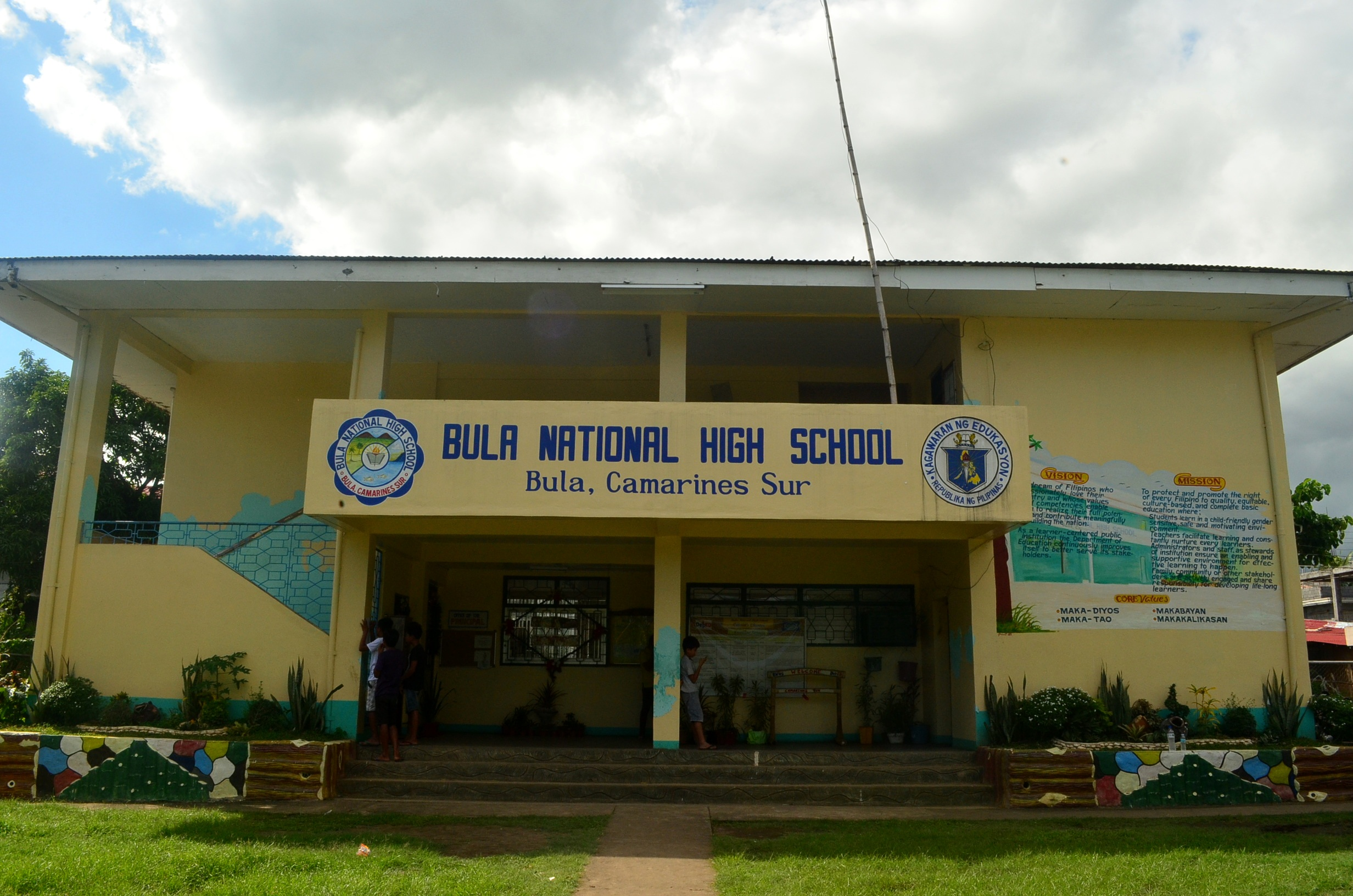
Bula National High School

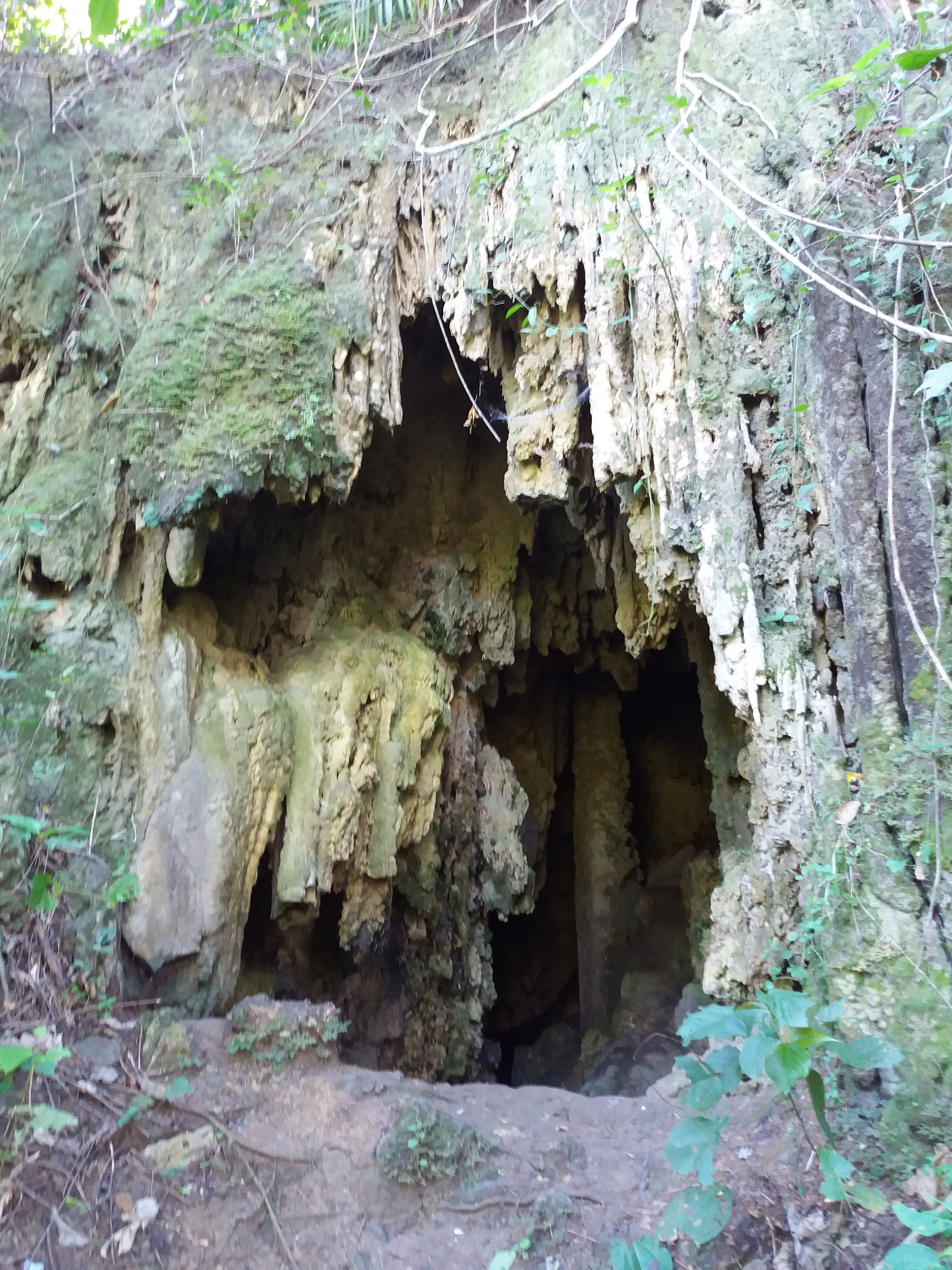
Nalalata Cave

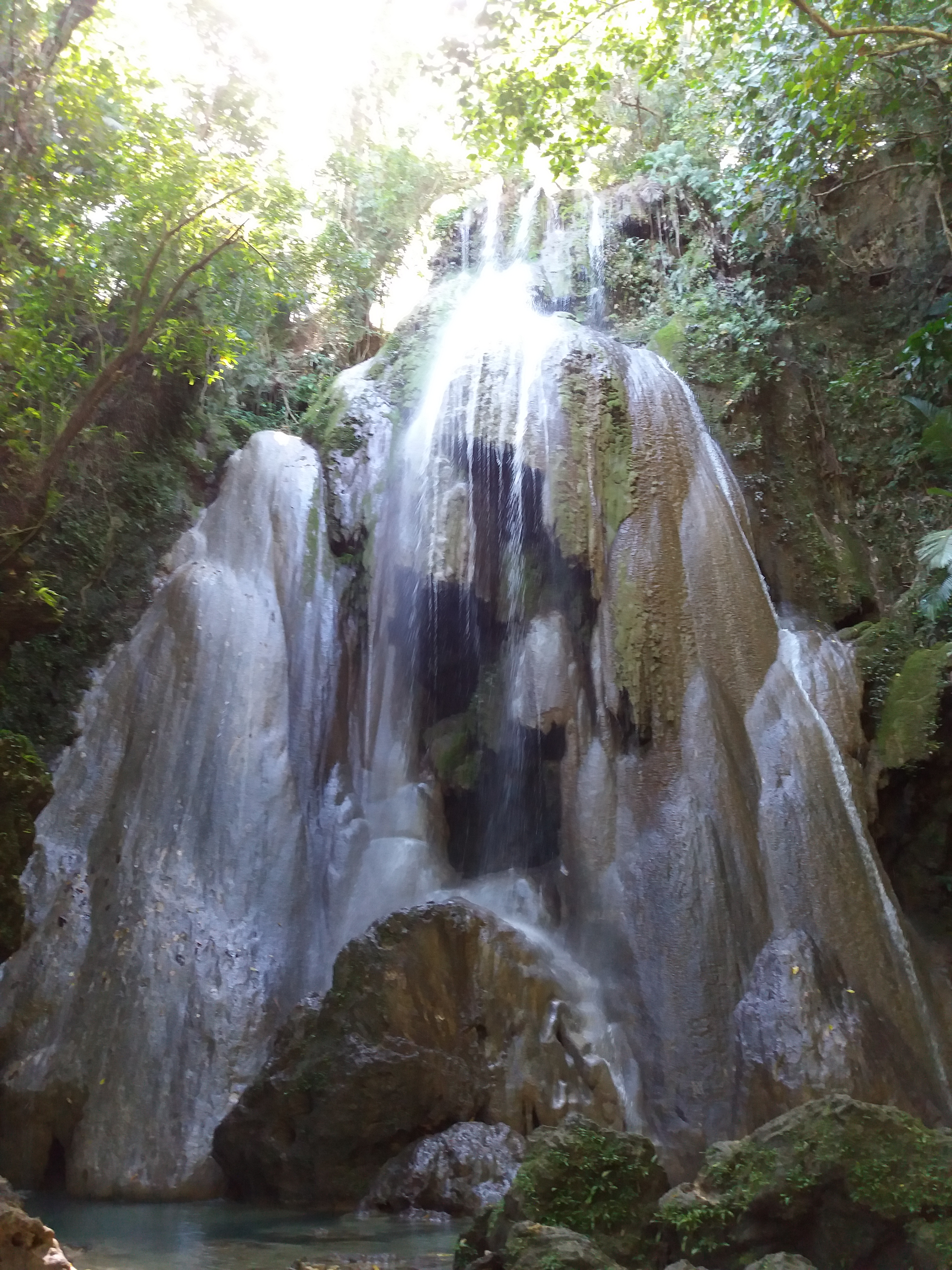
Nalalata Falls

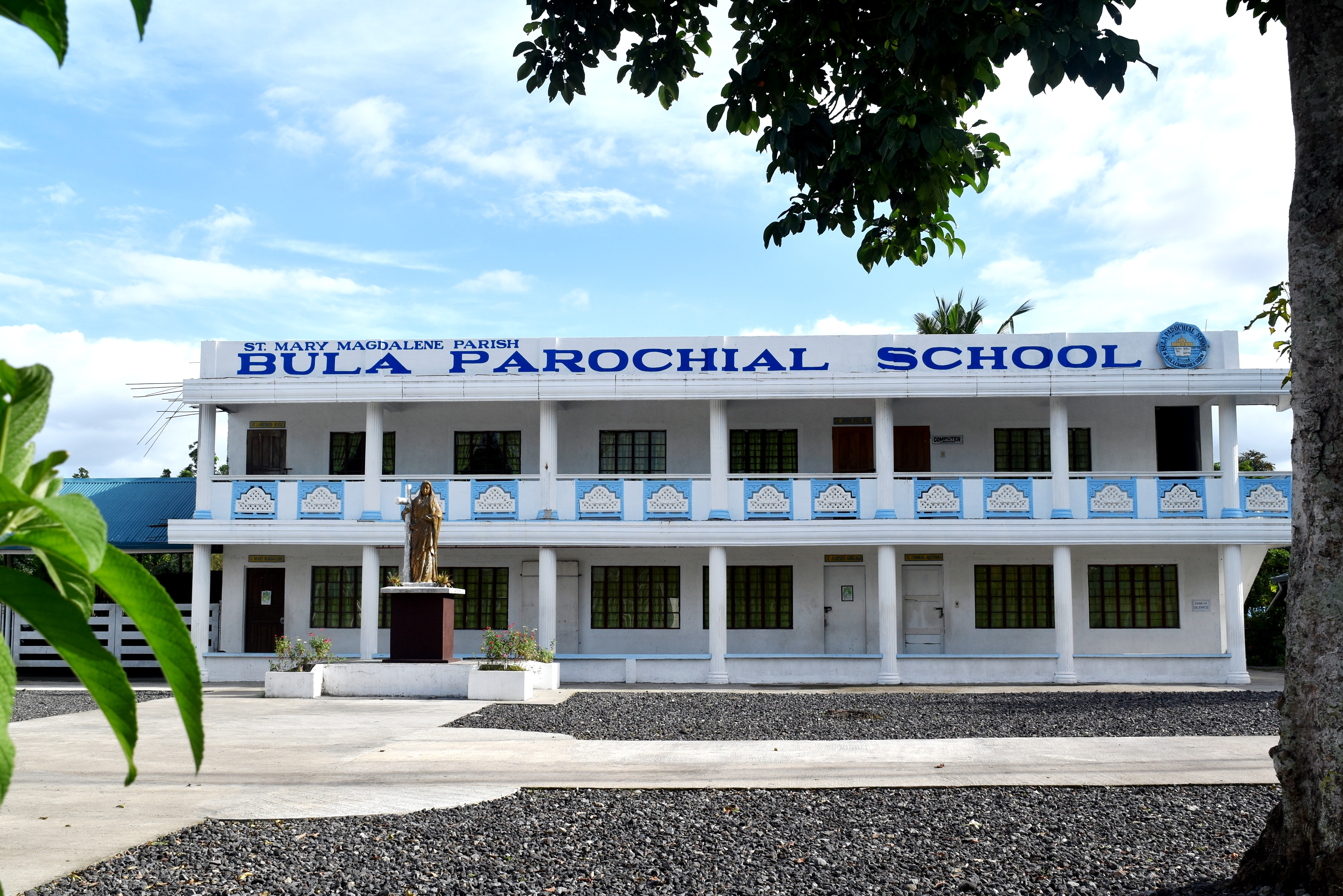
Bula Parochial School
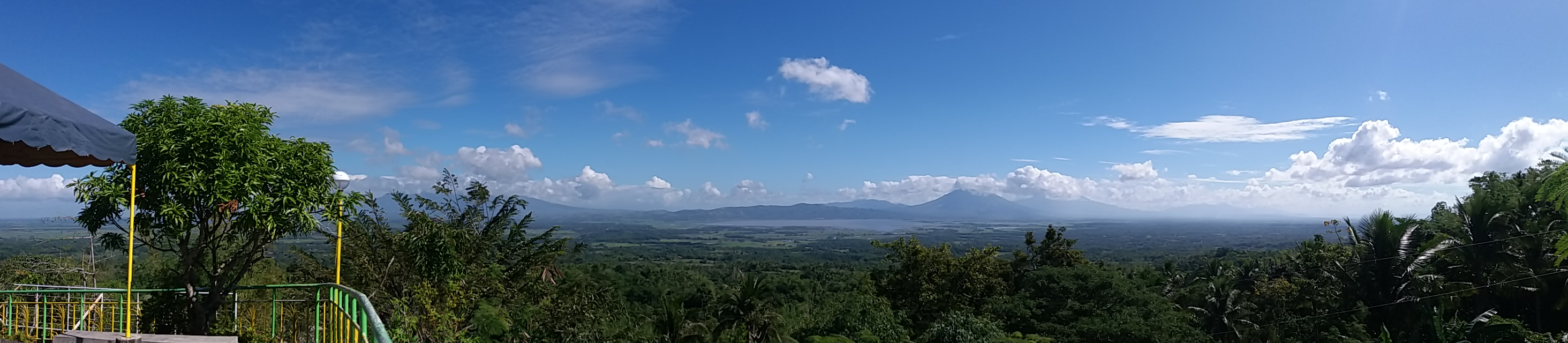
Panoramic View in Tanawan Park
