= Madell =

Madell is a surname. Notable people with the surname include:

- Dawn Sutter Madell (fl. 1990s–2020s), music writer and entrepreneur
- Geoffrey Madell (1934–2018), Scottish philosopher
- Zak Madell (born 1994), Canadian wheelchair rugby player

== See also ==
- Madell Point
- Madel (disambiguation)
