= Baao =

Municipality in Camarines Sur, Philippines

- Municipality
- Municipality of Baao
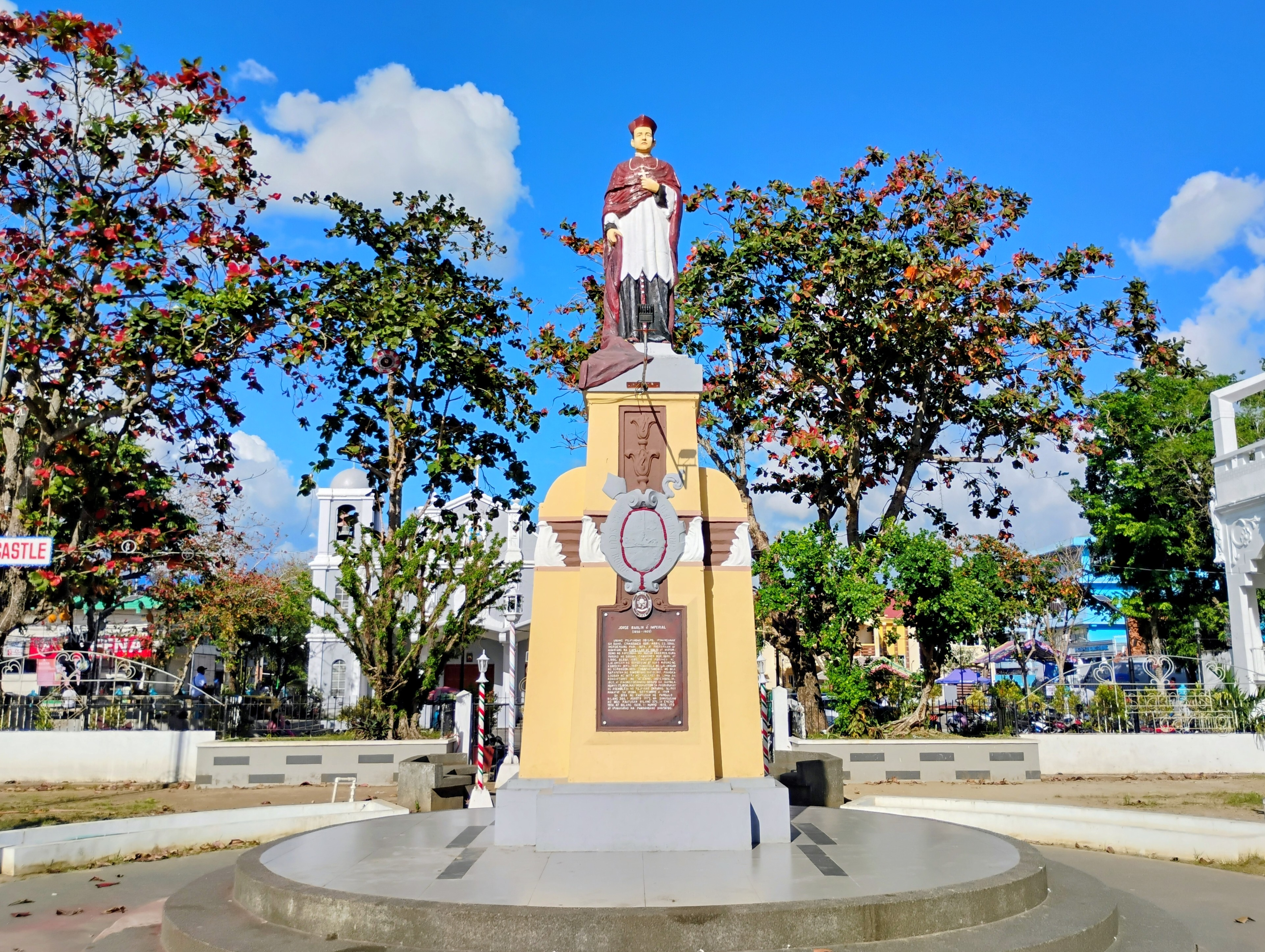
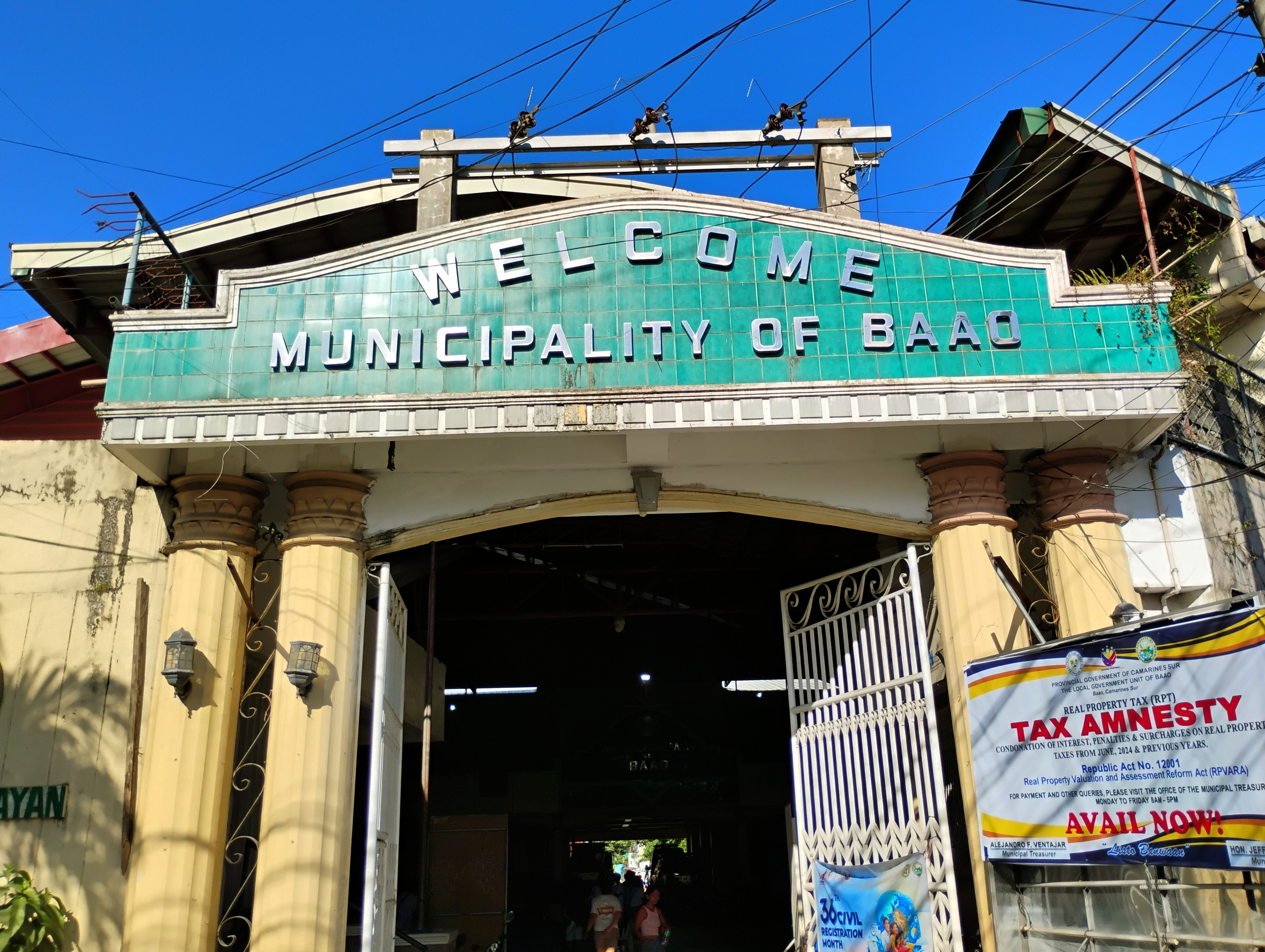
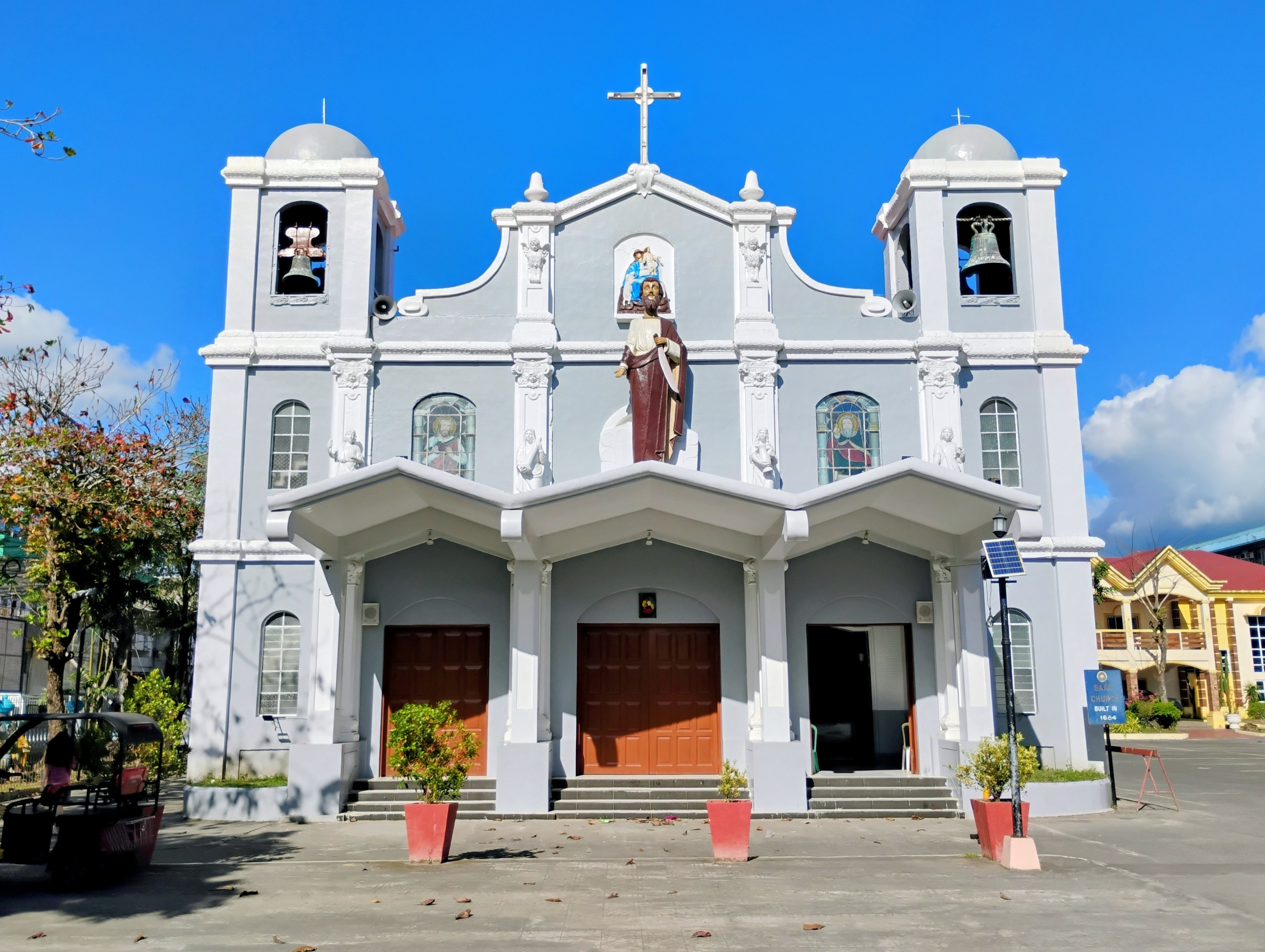
- Jorge Barlin Monument Baao Municipal Hall Saint Bartholomew Parish Church

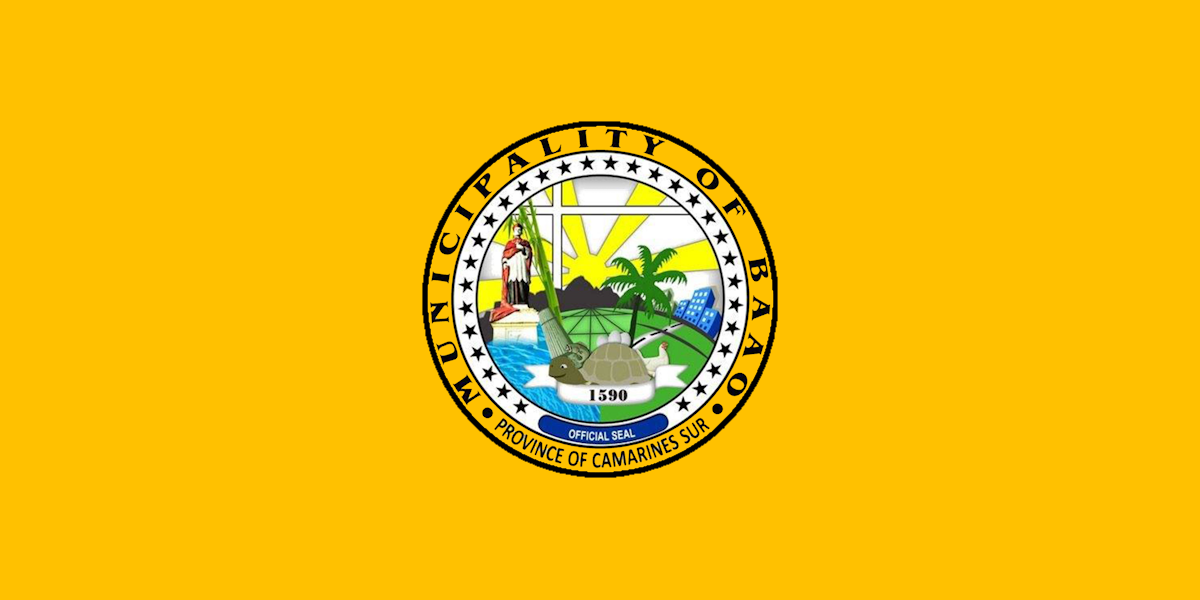
- Flag

- Map of Camarines Sur with Baao highlighted
- Interactive map of Baao
- Location within the Philippines
- Coordinates: 13°27′12″N 123°21′55″E
- Country: Philippines
- Region: Bicol Region
- Province: Camarines Sur
- District: 5th district
- Founded: 1590
- Barangays: 30 (see Barangays)

Government
  - Type: Sangguniang Bayan
  - Mayor: Jeffrey S. Besinio
  - Vice Mayor: Jonathan "Cuya Atan" Cuyahon
  - Representative: Miguel Luis R. Villafuerte
  - Municipal Council: Members: Arevalo, Alan; Malazarte, Cy; Agnas, Mico; Rivera, Romeo; Bayos, Eric; Bayos, Galileo; Bedural, Edwin; Villafuerte, Harvey
  - Electorate: 37,390 voters (2025)

Area
  - Total: 106.63 km^{2} (41.17 sq mi)
- Elevation: 57 m (187 ft)
- Highest elevation: 382 m (1,253 ft)
- Lowest elevation: 4 m (13 ft)

Population (2024 census)
  - Total: 61,357
  - Density: 575.42/km^{2} (1,490.3/sq mi)
  - Households: 13,200
- Demonym: Baaoeño

Economy
  - Income class: 1st municipal income class
  - Poverty incidence: 23.45% (2023)
  - Revenue: ₱ 281.2 million (2024)
  - Assets: ₱ 742.1 million (2024)
  - Expenditure: ₱ 245.1 million (2024)
  - Liabilities: ₱ 107.4 million (2024)

Service provider
  - Electricity: Camarines Sur 3 Electric Cooperative (CASURECO 3)
- Time zone: UTC+8 (PST)
- ZIP code: 4432
- PSGC: 0501701000
- IDD : area code: +63 (0)54
- Native languages: Rinconada Bikol; Central Bikol; Tagalog
- Website: baao.gov.ph

Baao, officially the Municipality of Baao (Rinconada Bikol: Banwāan ka Baao; Tagalog: Bayan ng Baao) is municipality in the province of Camarines Sur, Philippines. According to the 2024 census, it has a population of 61,357 people. The 1818 Spanish census recorded the area as having 1,538 native families and 57 Spanish-Filipino families.

== Geography ==
The municipality of Baao is within the 5th Congressional District of the province of Camarines Sur. The town is bounded on the north by the municipalities of Pili and Ocampo, on the east by the city of Iriga, on the west by Bula, and south by the municipality Nabua. Baao is 15 kilometres (9.3 mi) from Pili and 465 kilometres (289 mi) from Manila.

=== Barangays ===
Baao is politically subdivided into 30 barangays. Each barangay consists of puroks and some have sitios.

- Agdangan Pob. (San Cayetano)
- Antipolo
- Bagumbayan
- Buluang
- Cristo Rey
- Del Pilar
- Del Rosario (Poblacion)
- Iyagan
- La Medalla
- Caranday (La Purisima)
- Lourdes
- Nababarera
- Sagrada
- Salvacion
- San Francisco (Poblacion)
- San Isidro (Oras)
- San Jose (Poblacion)
- San Juan
- San Nicolas (Poblacion)
- San Rafael (Ikpan)
- Pugay (San Rafael/San Jose)
- San Ramon (Poblacion)
- San Roque (Poblacion)
- San Vicente
- Santa Cruz (Poblacion)
- Santa Eulalia
- Santa Isabel
- Santa Teresa (Vega)
- Santa Teresita (Tara-tara)
- Tapol

=== Climate ===
Climate data for Baao, Camarines Sur
Month	Jan	Feb	Mar	Apr	May	Jun	Jul	Aug	Sep	Oct	Nov	Dec	Year
Mean daily maximum °C (°F)	33 (91)	32 (90)	35 (95)	37 (99)	37 (99)	36 (97)	35 (95)	33 (91)	35 (95)	34 (93)	33 (91)	32 (90)	34 (94)
Mean daily minimum °C (°F)	26 (79)	26 (79)	28 (82)	30 (86)	31 (88)	31 (88)	29 (84)	28 (82)	29 (84)	28 (82)	28 (82)	27 (81)	28 (83)
Average precipitation mm (inches)	51.03 (2.01)	78.13 (3.08)	55.3 (2.18)	83.07 (3.27)	159.34 (6.27)	239.88 (9.44)	385.80 (15.19)	391.75 (15.42)	293.65 (11.56)	401.33 (15.80)	108.2 (4.26)	334.9 (13.19)	2,582.38 (101.67)
Average rainy days	21	24	19	20	25	29	31	29	29	29	27	30	313
Source: World Weather Online

== Demographics ==
Population census of Baao
Year	Pop.	±% p.a.
1903	7,871	—
1918	8,727	+0.69%
1939	11,950	+1.51%
1948	16,485	+3.64%
1960	22,724	+2.71%
1970	28,285	+2.21%
1975	30,219	+1.34%
1980	33,896	+2.32%
1990	39,040	+1.42%
1995	41,366	+1.09%
2000	46,693	+2.63%
2007	52,466	+1.62%
2010	54,971	+1.71%
2015	58,849	+1.31%
2020	61,493	+0.93%
2024	61,357	−0.05%
Source: Philippine Statistics Authority

In the 2024 census, the population of Baao was 61,357 people, with a density of 580 inhabitants per square kilometre or 1,500 inhabitants per square mile.

As of 2020 50,419 or 82% of people lived in urban areas while the remaining 11,074 18% people live in rural areas.

=== Language ===
Rinconada Bikol is the main language of the population. Baaoeños used the Baao variant, a lowland dialect (Sinaranəw) of Rinconada Bikol which is different of that in Iriga.

Tagalog and English are also spoken in formal gatherings and occasions. The latter is widely used in schools as well as in business transactions.

=== Religion ===
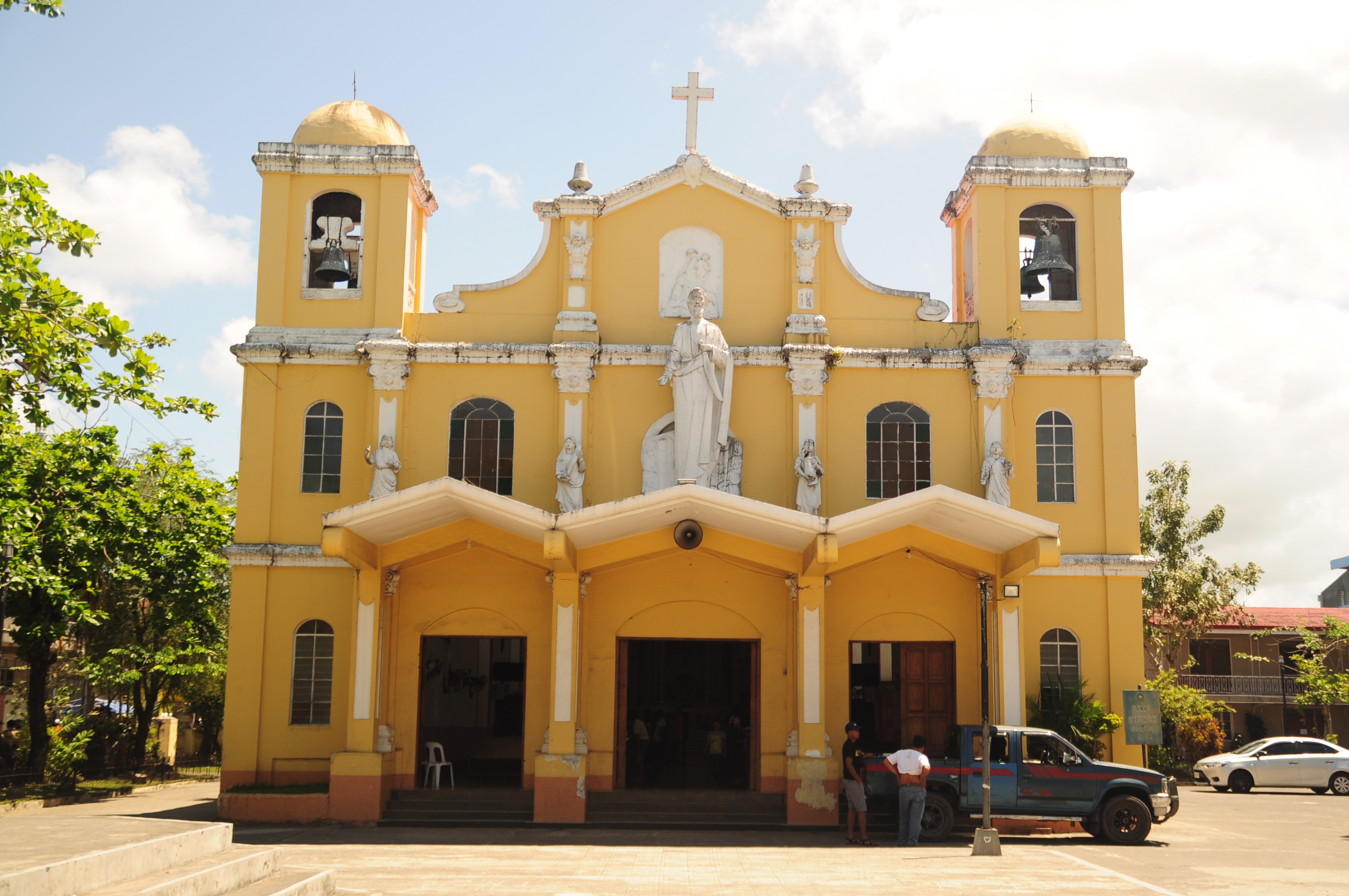
St. Bartholomew Church

As one of the historical towns of Catholicism in the Bicol region, Baao has a majority of Roman Catholic adherents. Iglesia ni Cristo on the other hand is the second largest group. Islam has already set off in the town and they are composed of Muslim merchants/immigrants from Mindanao. Various Protestant religious sects are also present.

== Economy ==
Poverty incidence of Baao (%)

Source: Philippine Statistics Authority

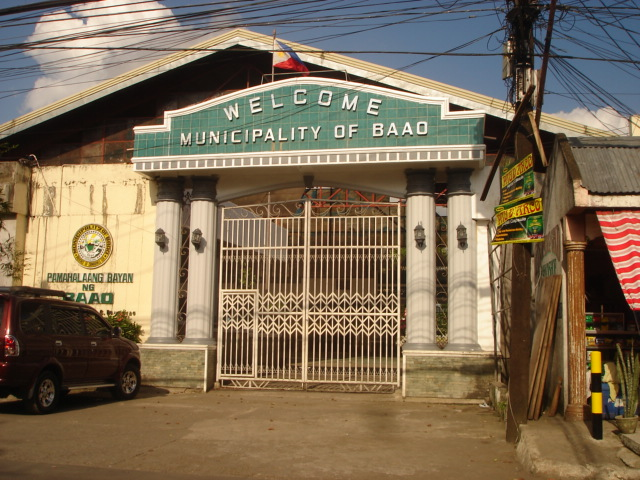
Baao town hall

== Transportation ==
Accessible only by land transportation, it is along the main route of the Maharlika Highway and the Philippine National Railways. Commuter rail services are provided by PNR serving from Naga City as its terminus and stops at Baao Station up to Ligao City in Albay then back again northward to Naga. Yet rail service to Manila is currently suspended due severe damages brought by Typhoon Reming in 2006. However, this is overtaken by bus companies that serve daily intercity trips. From Naga City, the easiest way to go to Baao is to ride a bus going to Iriga City from the Naga City Central Bus Terminal and disembark at Baao bus stop.

== Culture ==
=== Fiestas and festivals ===
The town fiesta (Feast of St. Bartolomew) or "Pintakasi" of Baao is celebrated from August 23 to 25. The only festival at Baao is the Barlin Festival; it commemorates the birthday of the First Filipino Bishop, Jorge I. Barlin. It is celebrated annually during the month of April.

== Education ==
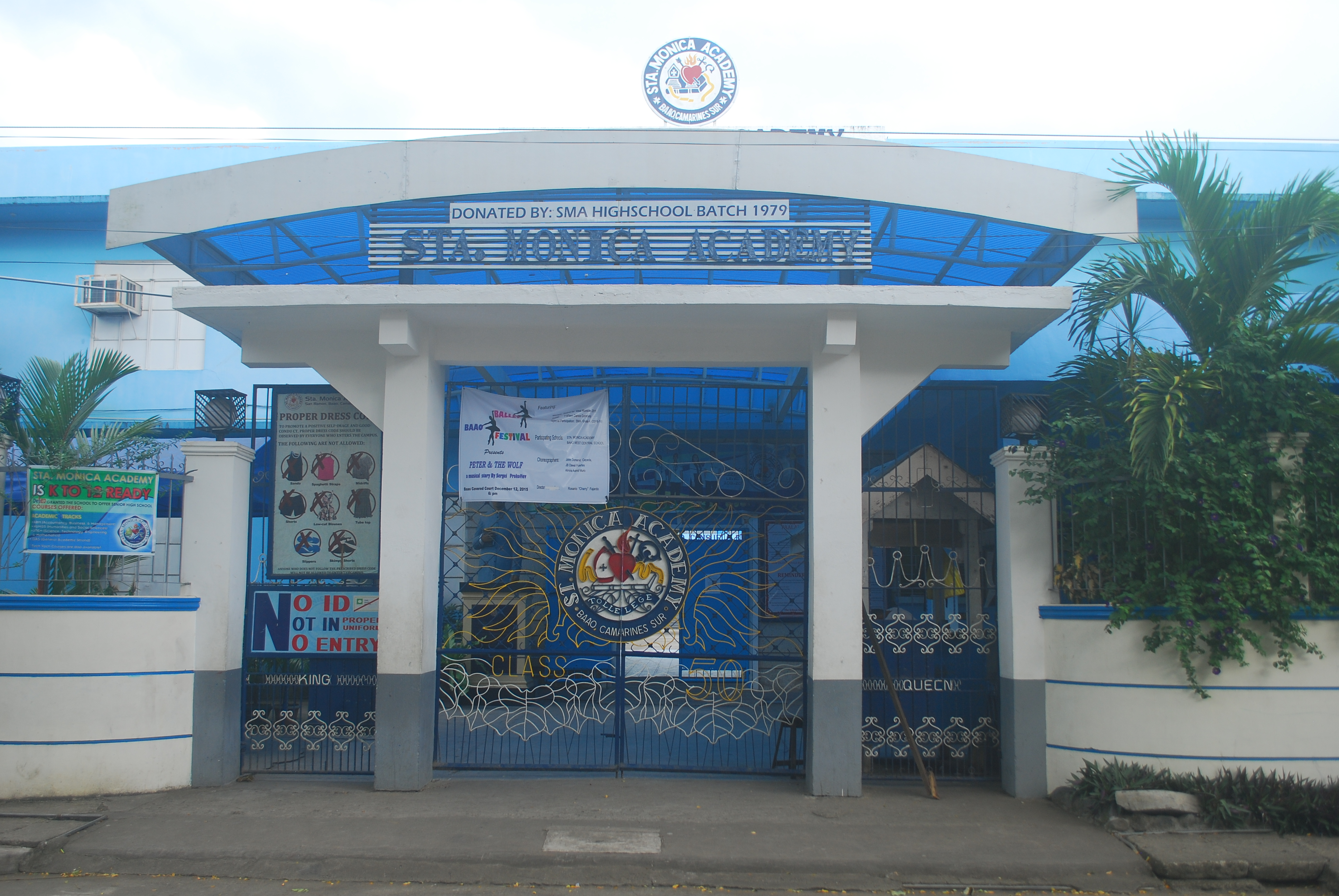
St. Monica Academy

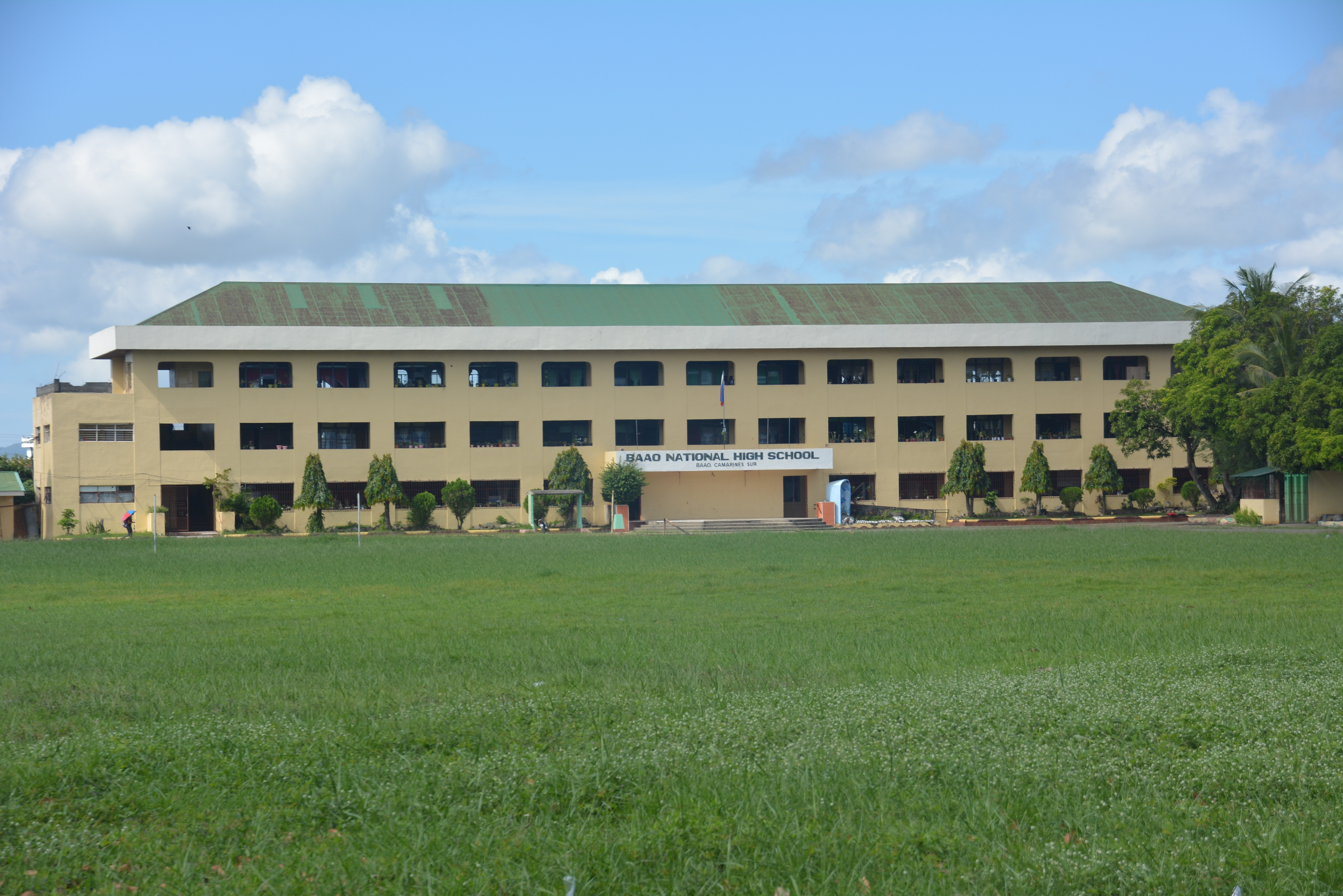
Baao National High School

The Baao Schools District Office governs all educational institutions within the municipality. It oversees the management and operations of all private and public, from primary to secondary schools.

Baao Community College is the lone state school in the municipality offering tertiary courses. On September 15, 2025, it was officially converted from a community college into a state college bearing the new name the Rinconada State College (RSC).

La Consolacion College Baao (formerly, the Sta. Monica Academy) is a private catholic school run by Augustinian sisters. It offers both elementary and secondary quality education with the purpose of creating graduates not only of high caliber but also with hearts that are "in one" with the poor.

Rosary School Inc. (formerly, the Rosary Learning Center) is a private educational institution offering complete preschool, elementary and secondary courses.

Ave Maria Early Childhood Impressions Center is a private catholic school for toddlers and preschoolers ages two years old and above.

=== Primary and elementary schools ===
- Agdangan Elementary School
- Antipolo Elementary School
- Arborvitae Plains Montessori
- Ave Maria Early Childhood Impressions Center
- Baao Adventist Multigrade School
- Baao Central School
- Baao West Central School
- Bagumbayan Elementary School
- Buluang Elementary School
- Caranday Elementary School
- Cristo Rey Elementary School
- Del Pilar Elementary School
- Honorville Child Learning Center
- Ikpan Elementary School
- Iyagan Elementary School
- La Consolacion College Baao
- La Medalla Elementary School
- Lourdes Elementary School
- Nababarera Elementary School
- Pugay Elementary school
- Rosary School
- Sagrada Elementary School
- Salvacion Elementary School
- San Isidro-Santa Teresita Elementary School
- San Jose Elementary School
- San Juan Elementary School
- San Vicente Elementary School
- Sta. Eulalia Elementary School
- Sta. Isabel Elementary School
- Sta. Teresa Primary School
- Tapol Elementary School

=== Secondary schools ===
- Agdangan National High School
- Baao National High School
- Caranday National High School
- Eusebia Paz Arroyo Memorial High School
- La Consolacion College Baao
- Nonito Paz Arroyo Memorial High School

=== Higher educational institutions ===
- Rinconada State College(RSC)

== Notable people ==
- Jorge Barlin é Imperial (1850-1909), First native Filipino bishop.
- Fr. Joaquin G. Bernas, S.J., J.S.D. Lawyer, Jesuit priest, constitutional law scholar, writer and newspaper columnist
- Luis Dato, writer, poet and educator
- Joker P. Arroyo, Filipino lawyer, politician and Senator of the Republic of the Philippines.
- Beatriz Saw, Pinoy Big Brother Season 2 Big Winner, actress
