= Pro Deo =

Pro Deo may refer to:

- a freeware chess engine; see REBEL (chess)
- A collection of poems and sonnets by Luis G. Dato.
- a Latin phrase meaning "for God", used in the Netherlands and Flanders to describe voluntarily professional work, like Pro bono
