= Madel (disambiguation) =

Madel is a river of Thuringia, Germany. Madel may also refer to:

- David Madel (born 1938), English politician
- Bjarne Mädel (born 1968), German actor
- Madel Alfelor (born 1970), Filipino politician

== See also ==
- Das Deutsche Mädel ("The German Girl"), was a Nazi propaganda magazine aimed at girls
- Madell, a surname
