= Camarines Sur's 5th congressional district =

Congressional district in the Philippines

- Constituency for the House of Representatives of the Philippines
- Boundary of congressional district in city/province

- Location of Camarines Sur within the Philippines
- Province: Camarines Sur
- Region: Bicol Region
- Population: 499,713 (2020)
- Electorate: 317,219 (2022)
- Major settlements: 7 LGUs: Cities; Iriga; Municipalities; Baao; Balatan; Bato; Buhi; Bula; Nabua
- Area: 954.68 km^{2} (368.60 sq mi)

Current constituency
- Created: 2009
- Representative: Miguel Luis R. Villafuerte
- Political party: NUP
- Congressional bloc: Majority

Camarines Sur's 5th congressional district is one of the five congressional districts in the province of Camarines Sur. It has been represented in the House of Representatives since 2010. The district was created following the 2009 reapportionment that split the 1st district into two thereby creating an additional district for the province. The district consists of the city of Iriga and adjacent municipalities in the Rinconada region of southern Camarines Sur that previously comprised the 4th district, namely Baao, Balatan, Bato, Buhi, Bula and Nabua. It is currently represented in the 20th Congress by Miguel Luis Villafuerte of the National Unity Party (NUP).

== Representation history ==
#	Image	Member	Term of office		Congress	Party	Electoral history	Constituent LGUs
#	Image	Member	Start	End	Congress	Party	Electoral history	Constituent LGUs
=== Camarines Sur's 5th district for the House of Representatives of the Philippines ===
District created October 12, 2009 from Camarines Sur's 4th district.
1		Salvio B. Fortuno	June 30, 2010	June 30, 2019	15th	Liberal	Elected in 2010.	2010–present Baao, Balatan, Bato, Buhi, Bula, Iriga, Nabua
1		Salvio B. Fortuno	June 30, 2010	June 30, 2019	16th	Liberal	Re-elected in 2013.	2010–present Baao, Balatan, Bato, Buhi, Bula, Iriga, Nabua
1		Salvio B. Fortuno	June 30, 2010	June 30, 2019	17th	Nacionalista	Re-elected in 2016.	2010–present Baao, Balatan, Bato, Buhi, Bula, Iriga, Nabua
2		Jocelyn F. Fortuno	June 30, 2019	June 30, 2022	18th	Nacionalista	Elected in 2019.	2010–present Baao, Balatan, Bato, Buhi, Bula, Iriga, Nabua
3		Miguel Luis R. Villafuerte	June 30, 2022	Incumbent	19th	NUP	Elected in 2022.	2010–present Baao, Balatan, Bato, Buhi, Bula, Iriga, Nabua
3		Miguel Luis R. Villafuerte	June 30, 2022	Incumbent	20th	NUP	Re-elected in 2025.	2010–present Baao, Balatan, Bato, Buhi, Bula, Iriga, Nabua

== Election results ==
=== 2025 ===
Candidate	Party	Votes	%
Miguel Luis Villafuerte (incumbent)	National Unity Party	192,182	78.43
Phil Fortuno	Nationalist People's Coalition	52,850	21.57
Total		245,032	100.00
Valid votes		245,032	90.28
Invalid/blank votes		26,369	9.72
Total votes		271,401	100.00
Registered voters/turnout		324,838	83.55
National Unity Party hold			
Source: Commission on Elections

=== 2022 ===
2022 Philippine House of Representatives elections
Party	Candidate	Votes	%
PDP–Laban	Miguel Luis Villafuerte	153,852	60.15
NPC	Madel Alfelor	101,944	39.85
Total votes		255,796	100.00
PDP–Laban gain from Nacionalista			

=== 2019 ===
2019 Philippine House of Representatives elections
Party	Candidate	Votes	%
Nacionalista	Jocelyn Fortuno	115,355	57.57
NPC	Peachy Alfelor	83,392	41.62
Independent	Jesus Aure	1,634	0.82
Total votes		200,381	100.00
Nacionalista hold			

=== 2016 ===
2016 Philippine House of Representatives elections
Party	Candidate	Votes	%
Nacionalista	Salvio Fortuno	134,372	78.56
UNA	Felix Alfelor Jr.	36,680	21.44
Total votes		171,052	100.00
Nacionalista hold			

=== 2013 ===
2013 Philippine House of Representatives elections
Party	Candidate	Votes	%
Liberal	Salvio Fortuno	75,178	51.09
NPC	Felix Alfelor, Jr.	42,295	28.74
UNA	Rez Cortez	13,474	9.16
Margin of victory		32,883	22.35%
Invalid or blank votes		16,210	11.02
Total votes		147,157	100.00
Liberal hold			

=== 2010 ===
2010 Philippine House of Representatives elections
Party	Candidate	Votes	%
Nacionalista	Salvio Fortuno	76,659	42.21
Lakas–Kampi	Emmanuel Alfelor	75,627	41.64
Liberal	Jesus Jay Dimaiwat	13,477	7.42
PDP–Laban	Mariano Trinidad	956	0.52
Valid ballots		166,719	91.79
Invalid or blank votes		14,907	8.21
Total votes		181,626	100.00
Nacionalista gain from Lakas–Kampi			

== See also ==
- Legislative districts of Camarines Sur
