= Luis Dato =

Filipino poet and writer (1906–1985)

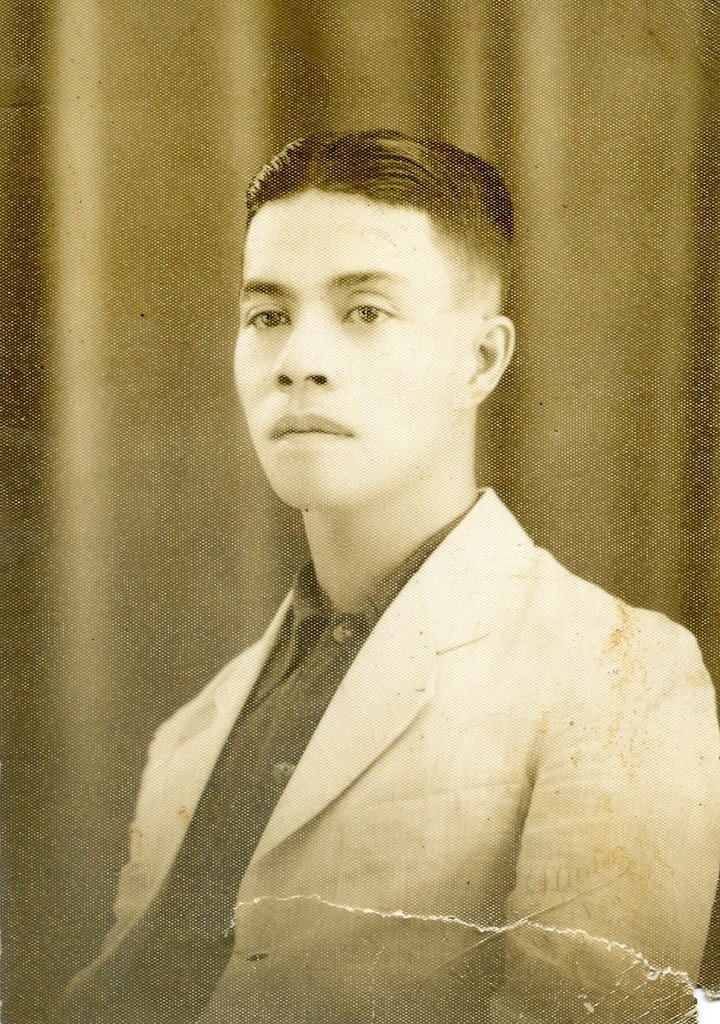
- Born: Luis Guevarra Dato; July 4, 1906; Baao, Camarines Sur, Insular Government of the Philippine Islands
- Died: January 29, 1985 (aged 78); Naga, Camarines Sur, Philippines
- Occupation: Poet
- Spouse: Cristeta B. Imperial
- Children: Vicente, Reynaldo, Myrna, Greta, Eugenio, Yolanda, Armi and Barbara
- Writing career
- Period: 1926–1975
- Notable works: Manila A Collection of Verse, My Book of Verses, Land of Mai
- Notable awards: Outstanding Catholic Poet 1965, Lifetime Achievement Award in the Premio Tomas Arejola para sa Literaturang Bikolnon 2006.
- Website: luisgdato.com

Luis Guevara Dato (4 July 1906 – 29 January 1985) was a Filipino poet, writer, educator, genealogist and politician from Baao, Camarines Sur. He was one of the first Filipinos to write and publish works in English. Among his poems are "The Spouse", "Day on the Farm" and "Among the Hills". In 1927, his "Mi Ultimo Pensamiento" was the first good English translation, in rhymes, of José Rizal's "Mi último adiós".

== Family ==
Luis was the third child of Eugenio Dato y Esplana and Barbara Guevara y Imperial. His siblings were: Francisca Dato Flores; Rodolfo Dato (former Dean of the University of Nueva Caceres and edited the anthology Filipino Poetry in 1924); Soledad "Choleng" Dato Hidalgo (one of the senior editors of Bikolana magazine published in Naga City in the late 70s; and Pablo Dato.

He married Cristeta Imperial y Bañaga. They had eight children: Vicente, Reynaldo, Myrna, Greta, Eugenio, Yolanda, Armi and Barbara.

== Education ==
Dato attended high school from 1923 to 1924; studied liberal arts from 1924 to 1928; and law (1928–1933) at the newly founded University of the Philippines in Manila. Some of his contemporaries were Jose Garcia Villa, Alvaro Martinez, Hose Hernandez, Eugenio Santos and Angela Manalang-Gloria. He continued his law degree at the University of Nueva Caceres in 1951. He also took up his master's Education degree in liberal arts at the University of Saint Anthony from 1971 to 1972.

== Works and career ==
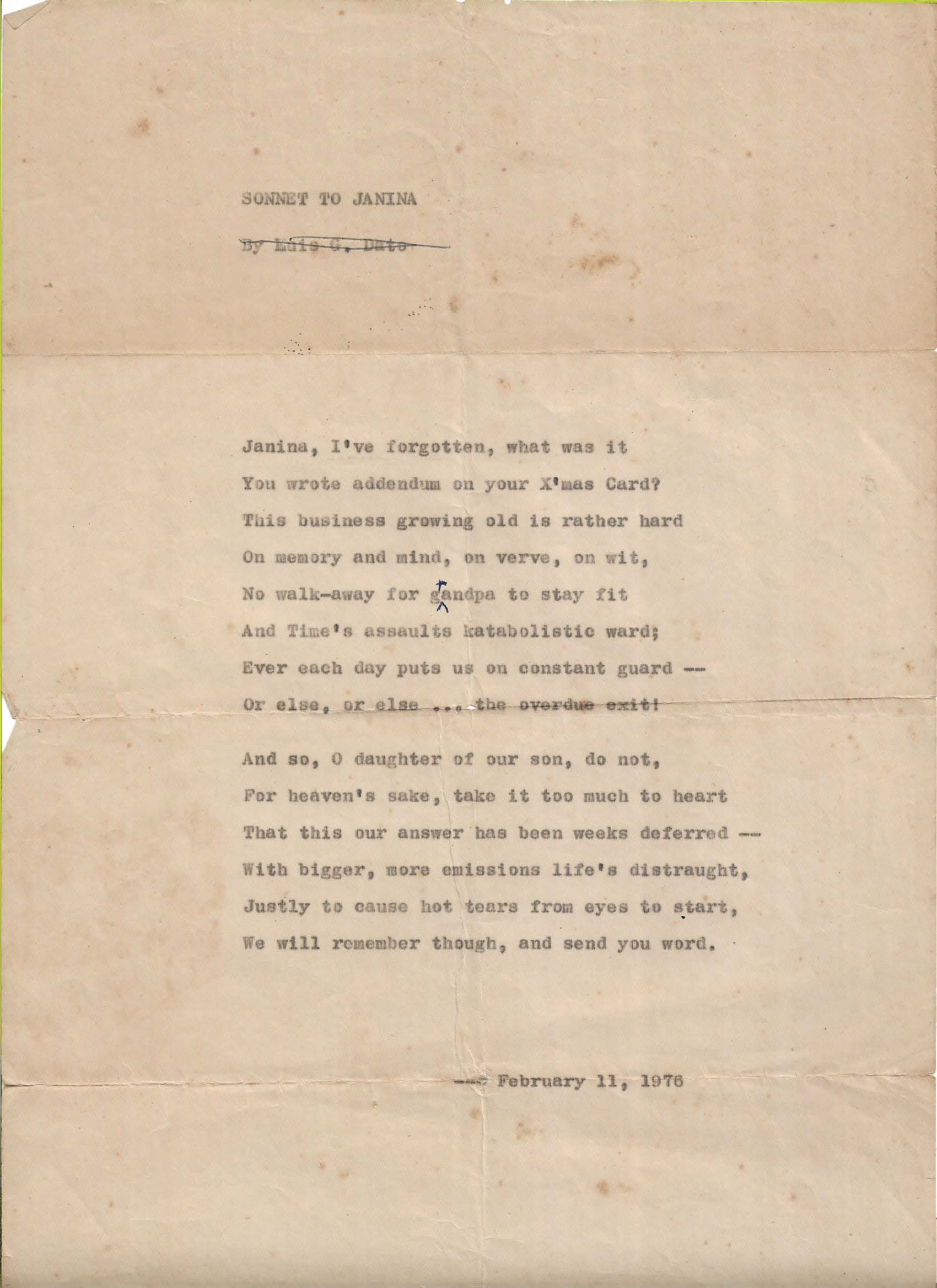
Luis Dato Sonnet to Janina

Dato never took up creative writing courses, but began writing before he enrolled in college. His first poems were published in The Philippine Collegian. In 1926, at the age of 20, he published his book Manila, A Collection of Verse. The book's foreword states:

And yet, although the author of the following poems has not mastered the idiom of English, and is not perfectly at ease in metre and rhyme, he thinks as a poet thinks; and there are many lines here, and some complete poems which show that he possesses poetic fervor of unusual intensity. Therefore he merits attention and encouragement.

The foreword was written by H. P. Scott, the Head of the Department of English at the College of Liberal Arts in the University of the Philippines. In 1936, he published his second book, My Book of Verses.

Dato's poems were anthologized in several published books, such as the Filipino Poetry, Rodolfo Dato; Philippine Prose and Poetry, Jose Garcia Villa; German-English Anthology of Filipino Poets, Pablo Laslo, etc.

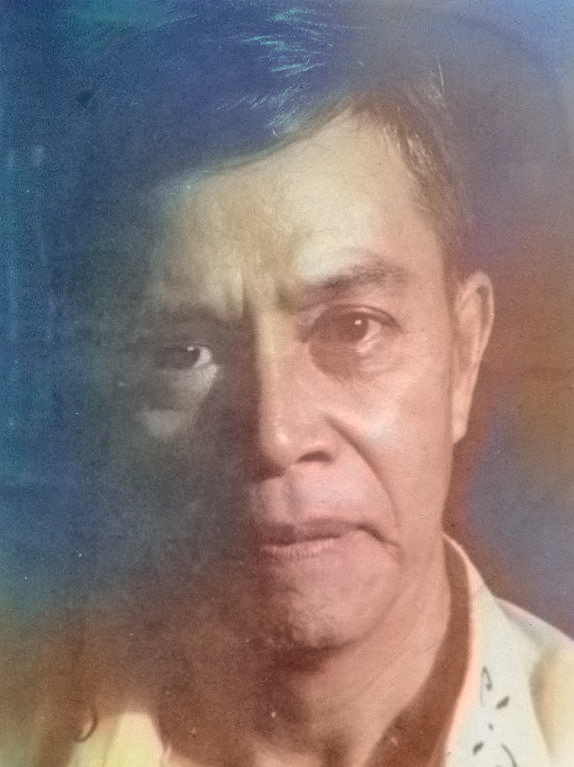
Luis G. Dato

Dato wrote several books in his native tongue, Bicol, and contributed to several newspapers and magazines; articles such as Kantahon na Bikol (1969), Morfologia kan Tataramon na Bikol (serialized in Naga Times), Patotodon sa Bikol (Bikol Mail), Sarabihon sa Bikol and his translation of the Pasyon, which he entitled, Life of Christ, which is his favorite among his poems. In 1972, while teaching at the University of St. Anthony in Iriga City, he published the Vocabulariong Ingles, Bikol, Castila.

In 1975, he wrote the epic The Land of Mai. It is written in a blank verse form numbering nearly 400 pages of typewritten manuscript. It narrates the detailed history of the Philippines up to the Marcos' era.

He became the municipal mayor of Baao, Camarines Sur, from 1941 to 1947 and co-authored research on Baao local history and pioneered studies on the genealogy of huge families in Baao such as the Imperials, Palencias, etc.

He was a member of the faculty at the Naga College (1953–1954), University of Nueva Caceres (1955–1967) and St. Anthony College (now University of Saint Anthony) (1947–1951; 1967–1978).

Upon his death, he had an unpublished manuscript that he called The Instant Lyre. It is a collection of almost 500 of his poems and sonnets that spans the period from the 1920s to the 1970s.

== Journalism and awards ==
Dato was the first editor of the Bicol Star from 1933 to 1934. He was the editor of Tingog nin Banwaan from 1939 to 1940; and was affiliated with other press outfits in Naga City like Bicolandia, Juan dela Cruz, Bicol Examiner, Naga Times and Balalong (1973–1975). He was also a member of the Board of Editors of the Bicol Mail.

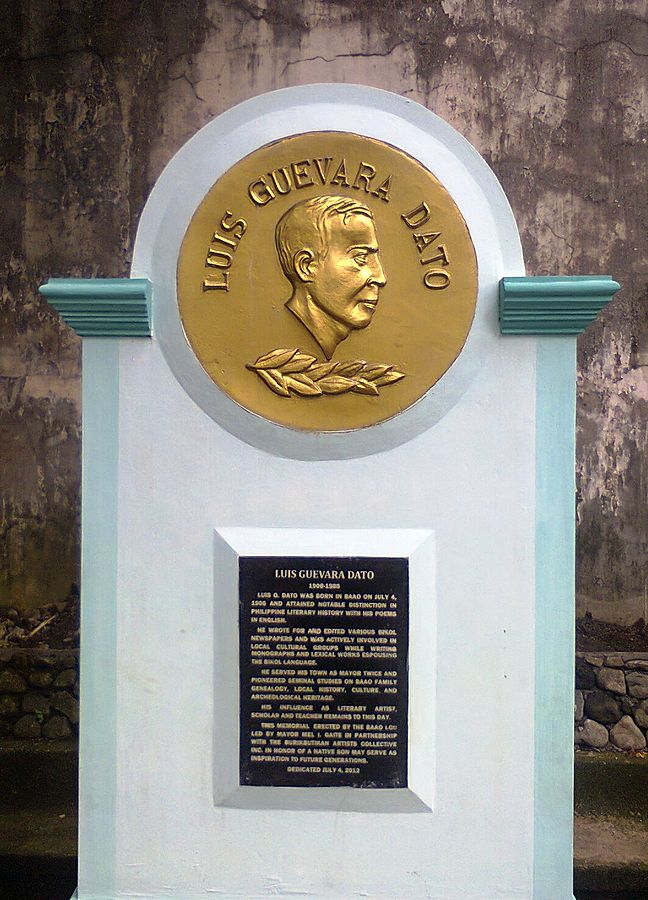
Luis G. Dato memorial marker at the Baao Town Plaza

He won several awards in English composition, oratorical and literary contests from 1922 to 1926. In 1965, he was named Outstanding Catholic Poet by United Poets Laureate International.

On July 4, 2012, Burikbutikan Artists Collective Inc., a group of artists from Baao (Paulix B. Robosa, who sculpted the medallion, Julius B. Bicaldo, Fr. Nunilon Arnold F. Bancaso Jr., Jofrey I. Botor); Iriga City (Frank Penones Jr., Kristian S. Cordero, Al Oliva), Buhi (Cesar Gumba); and Bula (Pano Carumba) led by Bernadette delos Santos (Baao), unveiled a Memorial Marker in the Baao Town Plaza to commemorate Dato's contribution to the Philippine literature in English, "local history, culture and archeological heritage".

The Luis G. Dato memorial marker is located at the Baao Town Plaza. It reads:

Luis G. Dato was born in Baao on July 4, 1906 and attained notable distinction in Philippine Literary History with his poems in English.

He wrote for and edited various Bikol newspapers and was actively involved in local cultural groups and wrote monographs and lexical works espousing the Bikol language.

He served his town as mayor twice and pioneered seminal studies on Baao family genealogy, local history, culture and archeological heritage. His influence as literary artist, scholar and teacher remains to this day.

This memorial erected by the Baao LGU led by Mayor Mel I. Gaite in partnership with the Burikbutikan Artists Collective Inc. in honor of a native son may serve as inspiration to future generations.

Dedicated July 4, 2012

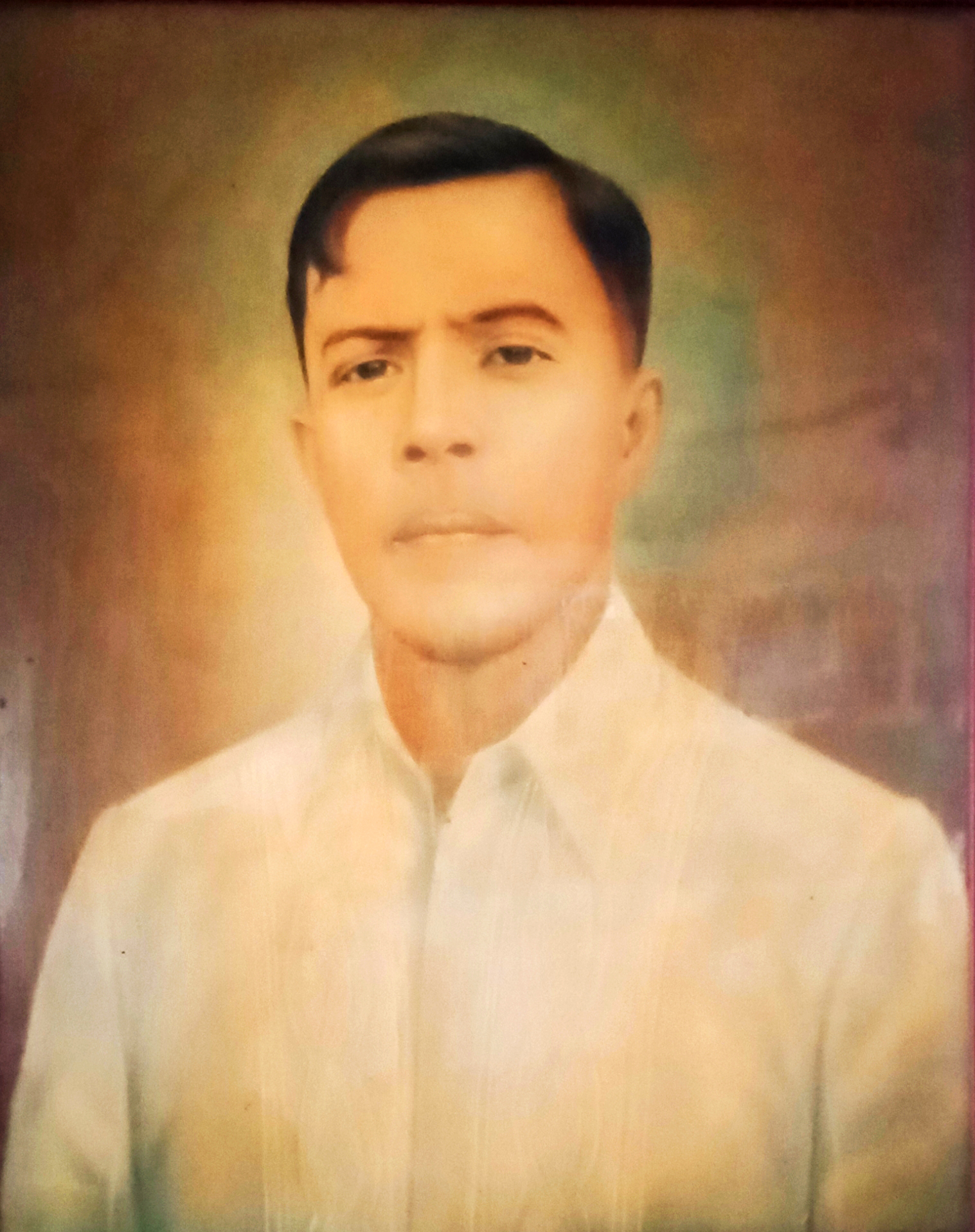
Luis G. Dato painting
