= Salvio Fortuno =

The Honorable Salvio Fortuno
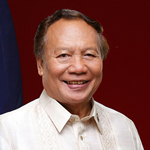

Vice Governor of Camarines Sur
- In office June 30, 2004 – June 30, 2010
- Governor: Luis Raymund Villafuerte
- Preceded by: Imelda Papin
- Succeeded by: Fortunato Peña
- In office June 30, 1992 – June 30, 1998
- Governor: Jose Bulaong (1992–1995); Luis Villafuerte (1995–1998)
- Preceded by: Jose Bulaong
- Succeeded by: Imelda Papin

Member of the House of Representatives of the Philippines from Camarines Sur's 5th district
- In office June 30, 2010 – June 30, 2019
- Preceded by: New district
- Succeeded by: Jocelyn F. Fortuno

Member of the House of Representatives of the Philippines from Camarines Sur's 4th district
- In office June 30, 1998 – June 30, 2001
- Preceded by: Ceriaco R. Alfelor
- Succeeded by: Felix Alfelor Jr.

Personal details
- Born: January 11, 1945 (age 81) Nabua, Camarines Sur, Philippines
- Party: Nacionalista (2016–present)
- Other political affiliations: Liberal (2010–2016)
- Spouse: Jocelyn Faustino
- Children: 7
- Education: Ateneo de Naga University; University of Nueva Caceres
- Occupation: Politician, Broadcaster

Salvio Patrick Edmund Balera Fortuno Sr. (born January 11, 1945) is a Filipino politician and former broadcaster. He served as the Representative of the 4th and 5th Districts of the province of Camarines Sur in the House of Representatives of the Philippines from 2010 to 2019.

== Education ==
Fortuno was born in Nabua, Camarines Sur and attended elementary school at Nabua Central Pilot School, and high school at Ateneo de Naga (now Ateneo de Naga University). He completed a college degree at the University of Nueva Caceres in Naga City.

== Family ==
Fortuno married Jocelyn Faustino, a teacher, on April 29, 1970. They have seven children, only one of whom is male. His wife Jocelyn previously served as the Representative of the 5th District of Camarines Sur.

== Career ==
Fortuno began his career as a radio announcer and later became Assistant General Manager of Filipinas Broadcasting Network, Inc., and Regional Manager for DZGE-DWEB (Naga City) and DWRC (Legazpi City). He also served as a director on the Board of Filipinas Broadcasting Network, Inc. and chairman of the Board of Directors of Camarines Sur Electric Cooperative, Inc. (CASURECO, Inc.).

He later entered politics, first serving as a member of the Provincial Board of Camarines Sur, then as Vice Governor of the province, and eventually as Acting Governor from 1999 to 2001. His political career continued when he was elected Representative of the former 4th District of Camarines Sur (2010–2013). When the province was redistricted into five districts, he became the Representative of the 5th District (2016–2018).

== Legislation ==
Republic Act No. 10755, sponsored by Fortuno and known as the "Fortuno Law," allows any elected official of the government, including the president, to be allowed the administering their oath of office by a barangay captain anywhere in the Philippines.

He was a staunch opponent of the Reproductive Health Bill in Congress.

Fortuno also supports scholars in their educational pursuits, providing assistance to thousands of students.

== Awards ==
- Gawad Hiyangta, for service to the community, awarded by Sumaro Bikolnon (2016)
- Outstanding Provincial Board Member, awarded by the Provincial Government of Camarines Sur
- Outstanding National Leader, awarded by the Vice-Governors' League of the Philippines
