= University of Saint Anthony =

Private university in Camarines Sur, Philippines

- Pamantasan ng San Antonio (Filipino); Unibersidad kan San Antonio
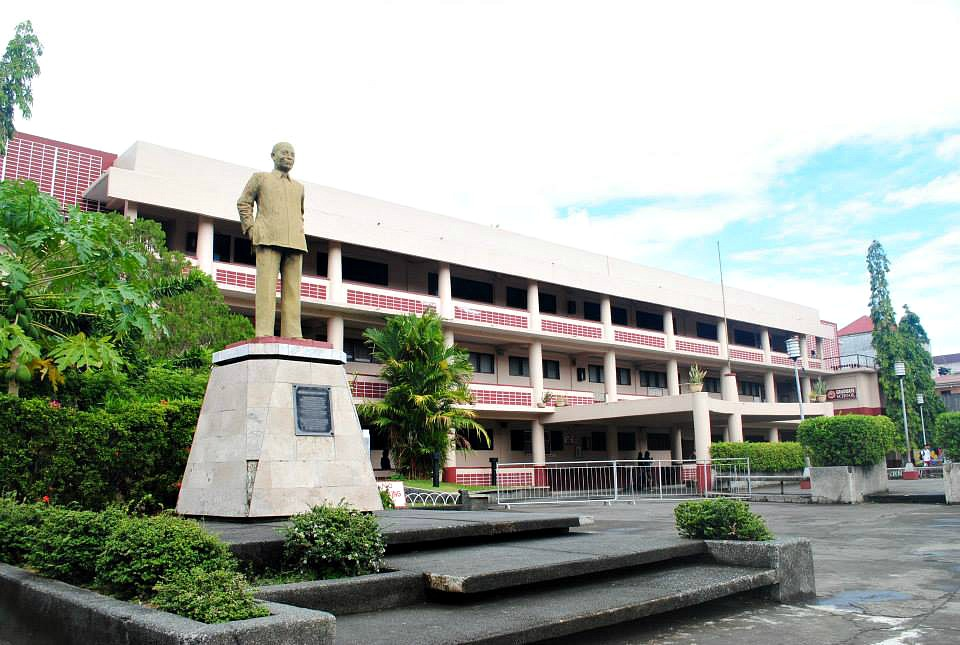
- Former name: St. Anthony Academy
- Motto: Pietas, Integritas, Sapientia; Piety, Integrity, Wisdom
- Type: Nonsectarian private university
- Established: August 18, 1947
- Founder: Dr. Santiago G. Ortega
- President: Atty. Emmanuel SD. Ortega, LLM
- Location: Brgy. San Miguel, Iriga City, Camarines Sur, Philippines; 13°25′25″N 123°24′24″E
- Hymn: USANT Hymn
- Colors: Maroon, gold, white
- Nickname: Mighty Maroons
- Website: www.usant.edu.ph
- Location in Luzon Location in the Philippines

The University of Saint Anthony (USANT) is a private, non-sectarian and non-profit educational institution in the Philippines. It was founded in 1947 by Dr. Santiago G. Ortega. USANT is located at Iriga City, Camarines Sur province, Philippines. Originally known as the St. Anthony Academy, it was elevated to the status of university in December 18, 1973. The school now also has two campuses located in Indonesia.

== Degree programs offered ==
- Bachelor of Science in Accountancy
- Bachelor of Science in Accounting Information System
- Bachelor of Science in Internal Auditing
- Bachelor of Science in Management Accounting
- Bachelor of Science in Criminology
- Bachelor of Science in Architecture
- Bachelor of Science in Civil Engineering
- Bachelor of Science in Marine Engineering
- Bachelor of Science in Marine Transportation
- Bachelor of Science in Nursing
- Bachelor of Science in Business Administration
- Bachelor of Science in Hospitality Management
- Bachelor of Science in Tourism Management
- Bachelor of Science in Computer Science
- Bachelor of Library and Information Science
- Bachelor of Science in Office Administration
- Bachelor of Arts in Psychology
- Bachelor of Arts in Communication
- Bachelor of Arts in English Language
- Bachelor of Arts in Political Science
- Bachelor of Elementary Education
- Bachelor of Secondary Education
- Bachelor of Technology and Livelihood Education
- Bachelor of Early Childhood Education
- Bachelor of Physical Education
- Bachelor of Special Needs Education

== Secondary and elementary school ==
- Junior and Senior High School
- Night High School class
- Montessori Grade School

== Graduate school ==
- Doctor of Philosophy in Education
- Master of Arts in Education
- Master of Arts in Nursing
- Masters in Business Administration
- Masters in Police Administration

== Notable alumni ==
- Luis G. Dato - Lawyer, writer and poet
