= Balatan =

Municipality in Camarines Sur, Philippines

- Municipality
- Municipality of Balatan
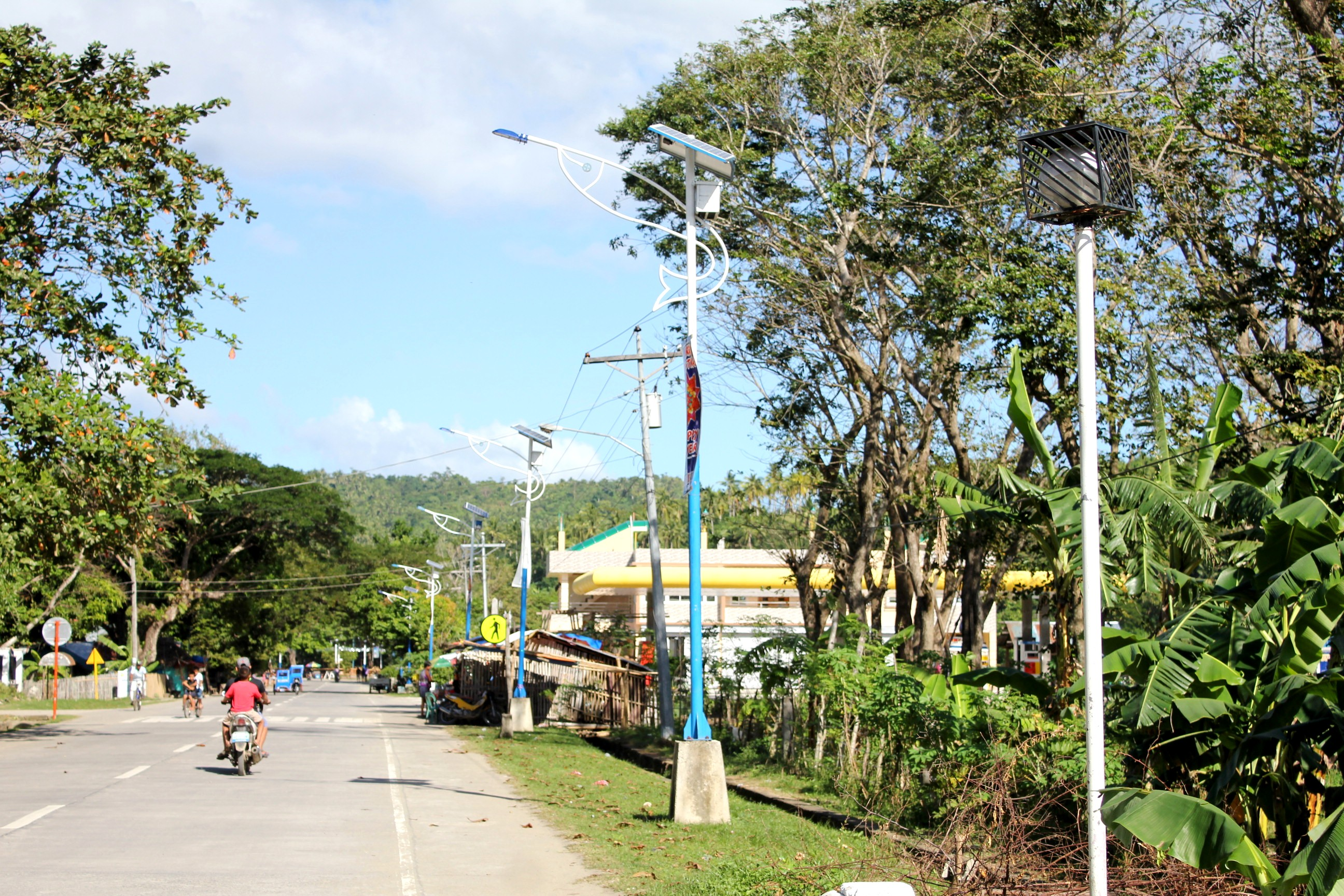
- Street in Balatan

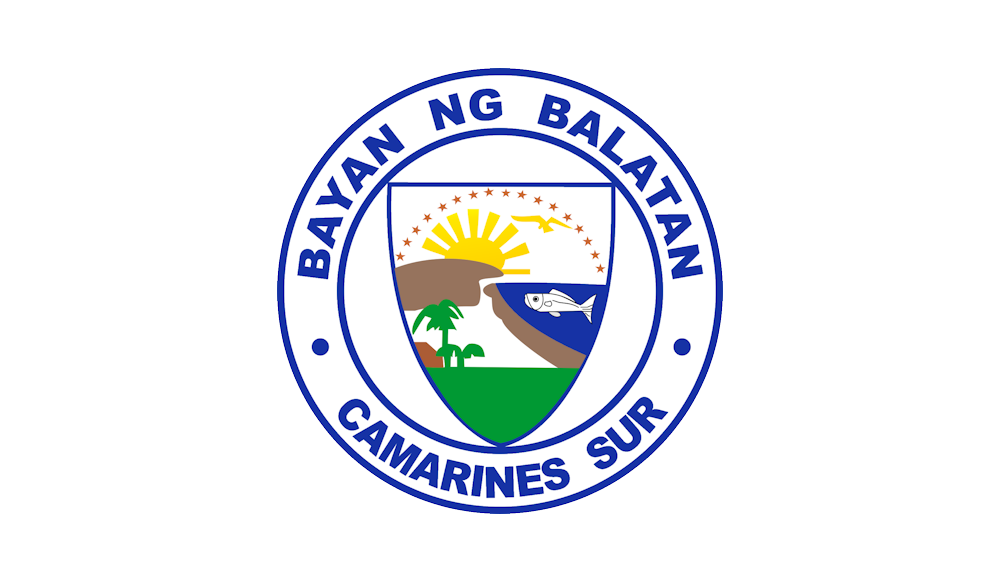
- Flag Seal
- Motto: Balateño, Oragon!
- Map of Camarines Sur with Balatan highlighted
- Interactive map of Balatan
- Location within the Philippines
- Coordinates: 13°19′01″N 123°14′25″E
- Country: Philippines
- Region: Bicol Region
- Province: Camarines Sur
- District: 5th district
- Founded: 1951
- Barangays: 17 (see Barangays)

Government
  - Type: Sangguniang Bayan
  - Mayor: Domingo T. Abliter
  - Vice Mayor: Jhun Narito
  - Representative: Miguel Luis R. Villafuerte
  - Municipal Council: Members: Andres B. Landagan; Kisia May F. Sombrero; Ruth B. Dimaiwat; Ma. Isabel B. Borja; Nena B. Borja; Ruben D. Briones; Robert M. Saysay; Abegail L. Aslor
  - Electorate: 20,845 voters (2025)

Area
  - Total: 93.09 km^{2} (35.94 sq mi)
- Elevation: 71 m (233 ft)
- Highest elevation: 415 m (1,362 ft)
- Lowest elevation: 0 m (0 ft)

Population (2024 census)
  - Total: 31,069
  - Density: 333.8/km^{2} (864.4/sq mi)
  - Households: 6,464
- Demonym: Balateño

Economy
  - Income class: 3rd municipal income class
  - Poverty incidence: 37.63% (2023)
  - Revenue: ₱ 157.7 million (2024)
  - Assets: ₱ 574.7 million (2024)
  - Expenditure: ₱ 156.8 million (2024)
  - Liabilities: ₱ 75 million (2024)

Service provider
  - Electricity: Camarines Sur 3 Electric Cooperative (CASURECO 3)
- Time zone: UTC+8 (PST)
- ZIP code: 4436
- PSGC: 0501702000
- IDD : area code: +63 (0)54
- Native languages: Rinconada Bikol; Central Bikol; Tagalog

Balatan, officially the Municipality of Balatan (Rinconada Bikol: Banwaān ka Balatan; Tagalog: Bayan ng Balatan), is a municipality in the province of Camarines Sur, Philippines. According to the 2024 census, it has a population of 31,069 people.

It is known for its nature spots, local culture, and outdoor fun like the Lake Balaton, the sand dunes, and Balatan Hill for scenic views.

== Etymology ==
The town got its name after Don Gregorio Balatan. He was the first mayor of the municipality, and he founded the Balatan Institute Memorial High School (formerly Balatan Institute), the first school in town.

== History ==
Balatan was once a sitio known as Siramag which belonged to the town of Nabua.

In 1951, Camarines Sur Provincial Board Member Gregorio O. Balatan Sr. proposed a resolution to divide Nabua into two municipalities: Nabua and Balatan. Balatan then was separated from its mother town and became independent on December 3, 1951, under Executive Order (EO) No. 485 of then President Elpidio Quirino. It was named after Don Rufino Balatan which is the father of Board Member Gregorio O. Balatan Sr.

== Geography ==
This town bounded by the municipalities of Bula, Bato, and Nabua, as well as Ragay Gulf.

Animasola Island is part of this municipality's territory.

=== Barangays ===
Balatan is politically subdivided into 17 barangays. Each barangay consists of puroks and some have sitios.

- Cabanbanan
- Cabungan
- Camangahan
- Cayogcog
- Coguit
- Duran
- Laganac
- Luluasan
- Montenegro (formerly Maguiron, renamed in honor of Mayor Candido Montenegro)
- Pararao (Parao)
- Siramag (Poblacion)
- Pulang Daga
- Sagrada Nacacale
- San Francisco
- Santiago Nacacale
- Tapayas
- Tomatarayo

=== Climate ===
Climate data for Balatan, Camarines Sur
Month	Jan	Feb	Mar	Apr	May	Jun	Jul	Aug	Sep	Oct	Nov	Dec	Year
Mean daily maximum °C (°F)	33 (91)	32 (90)	36 (97)	37 (99)	38 (100)	37 (99)	35 (95)	33 (91)	33 (91)	34 (93)	33 (91)	32 (90)	34 (94)
Mean daily minimum °C (°F)	27 (81)	27 (81)	29 (84)	31 (88)	32 (90)	32 (90)	31 (88)	29 (84)	30 (86)	29 (84)	28 (82)	28 (82)	29 (85)
Average precipitation mm (inches)	36.63 (1.44)	49.6 (1.95)	46.66 (1.84)	78.81 (3.10)	93.81 (3.69)	135.51 (5.34)	326.31 (12.85)	406.10 (15.99)	214.85 (8.46)	313.98 (12.36)	76.2 (3.00)	262 (10.3)	2,040.46 (80.32)
Average rainy days	19	23	17	19	23	27	31	29	27	29	24	29	297
Source: World Weather Online

== Demographics ==
Population census of Balatan
Year	Pop.	±% p.a.
1960	11,189	—
1970	12,146	+0.82%
1975	13,159	+1.62%
1980	15,191	+2.91%
1990	19,324	+2.44%
1995	21,075	+1.64%
2000	22,537	+1.45%
2007	25,982	+1.98%
2010	28,699	+3.69%
2015	30,922	+1.43%
2020	30,669	−0.17%
2024	31,069	+0.31%
Source: Philippine Statistics Authority

In the 2024 census, the population of Balatan was 31,069 people, with a density of 330 inhabitants per square kilometre or 850 inhabitants per square mile.

Rinconada Bikol is the mother tongue spoken by 96.67% of the population.

In the period 1960 to 1997, there was an average of 97.60% of total housing units in the municipality that were occupied while only 3.40% were vacant.

Literacy Rate

- Urban area literacy rate: 98.29%
- Rural area literacy rate: 97.17%

Religious affiliation

- Catholics: 96.50%
- Iglesia ni Cristo: 2.00%
- Others: 1.50%

== Economy ==
Poverty incidence of Balatan

Source: Philippine Statistics Authority

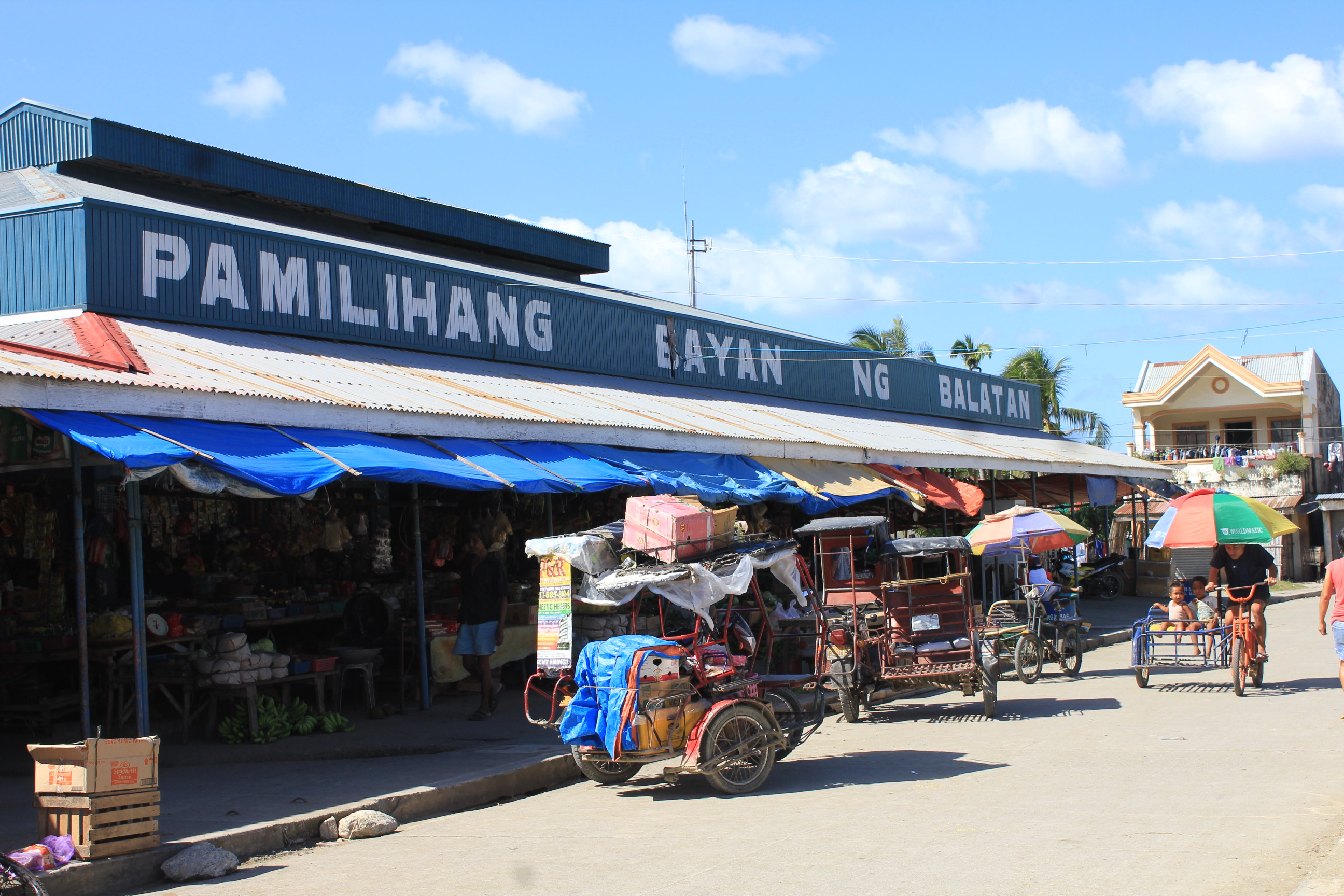
Balatan Public Market

The town's economy is supported by people from the Burias Island of Masbate province who are mostly trading their products in this small municipality. Balatan celebrates the Pintakasi and Pagkamundag Festivals annually on February 18 and December 1–3 respectively.

Minor central business district consists of public market, grocery, sari-sari stores, welding and vulcanizing shop, calling office, fish dealer, bakery, barber shop, beauty parlor, billiard hall, coco lumber dealer, junk shop and cable network. Neighborhood centers consists of sari-sari stores, bakery, videoke/bar, mini-sound system, repair shops, piggery, cockpit, bakery, furniture shop, fish dealer, repair and welding shops, copra dealer, among others.

The only industrial business is a mini-containerized ice plant which caters to the needs of rich-fishing activities, and a few rice mills. There are six beach resorts catering to domestic tourism.

Agriculture sector

- 75.04% of the total municipal land area are devoted to crops such as rice, corn, vegetables, legumes, coffee, high value crops and fruits, sugar cane, coconut, banana, abaca, root crops and industrial crops
- For livestock production: 37 private owners engaged in raising carabaos, cattle, swine or poultry
- For fishery production: 2 commercial, 298 local.

== Government ==
The current and the 8th mayor is Domingo "Ding" Teñoso Abliter.

== Infrastructure ==
=== Transportation ===
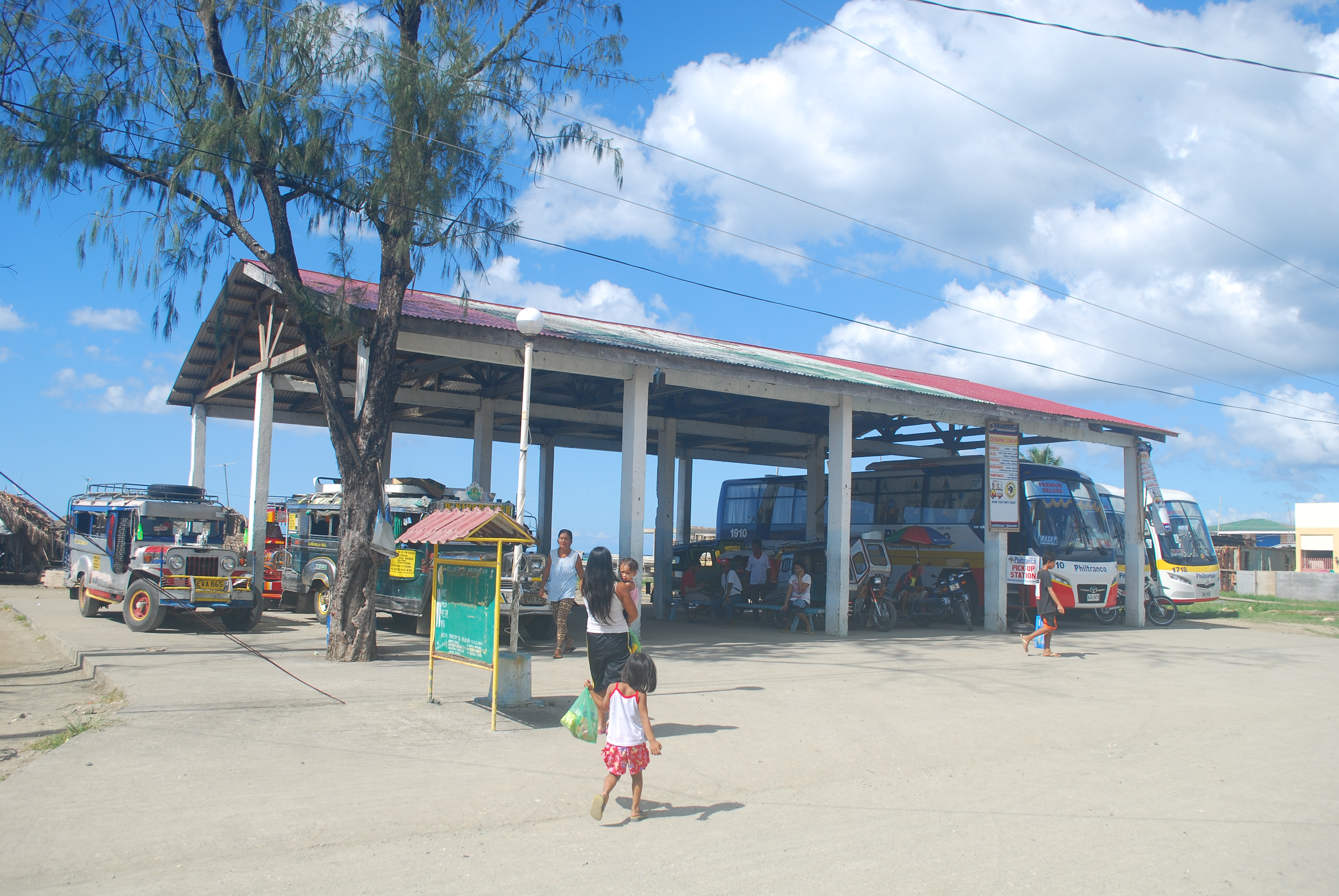
Balatan bus terminal

Land transportation refers to the present road circulation system as well as bus, van, and jeepney terminal. Marine transportation facility operates through the existing Balatan Municipal Port of Ragay Gulf.

=== Utilities ===
Water supply is distributed under Level III and Level I water systems: Level III is operated by the Balatan Water District; Level I water supply system consisting of either shallow wells, deep wells or improved spring provides alternative water supply source.

Power and electricity:

- 95% of the total households in the municipality are now served with electricity
- Barangays with electricity are serviced by CASURECO III

Communication facilities include the postal services, telegraph and telegraphic transfer service facilities, and telephone services.

== Public services ==
=== Health ===
- Crude birth rate: 19.97%
- Crude death rate: 2.05%
- Infant mortality rate: 11.49%
- Young child mortality: 1.53%
- Maternal mortality rate: 3.22%
- General medical consultation rate: 358.68%
- Hospitalization rate: 6.57%
- Health service and facilities implemented by the municipal health office through its Rural Health Unit
- Community Hospital (under-construction)
- Existence of four barangay health stations

=== Protective ===
Facilities for protective services include the police headquarters, police substation, fire station, municipal jail, and Coast Guard.

=== Social welfare ===
Existing social welfare organizations or institutions include CVRD'S People Organization, KALIPI (Women) PYM, Federation of Day Care Workers, 4Ps, RincoMESA (Rinconada Movement for Environment and Sustainable Agriculture) and Kalahi-CIDDS.

== Education ==
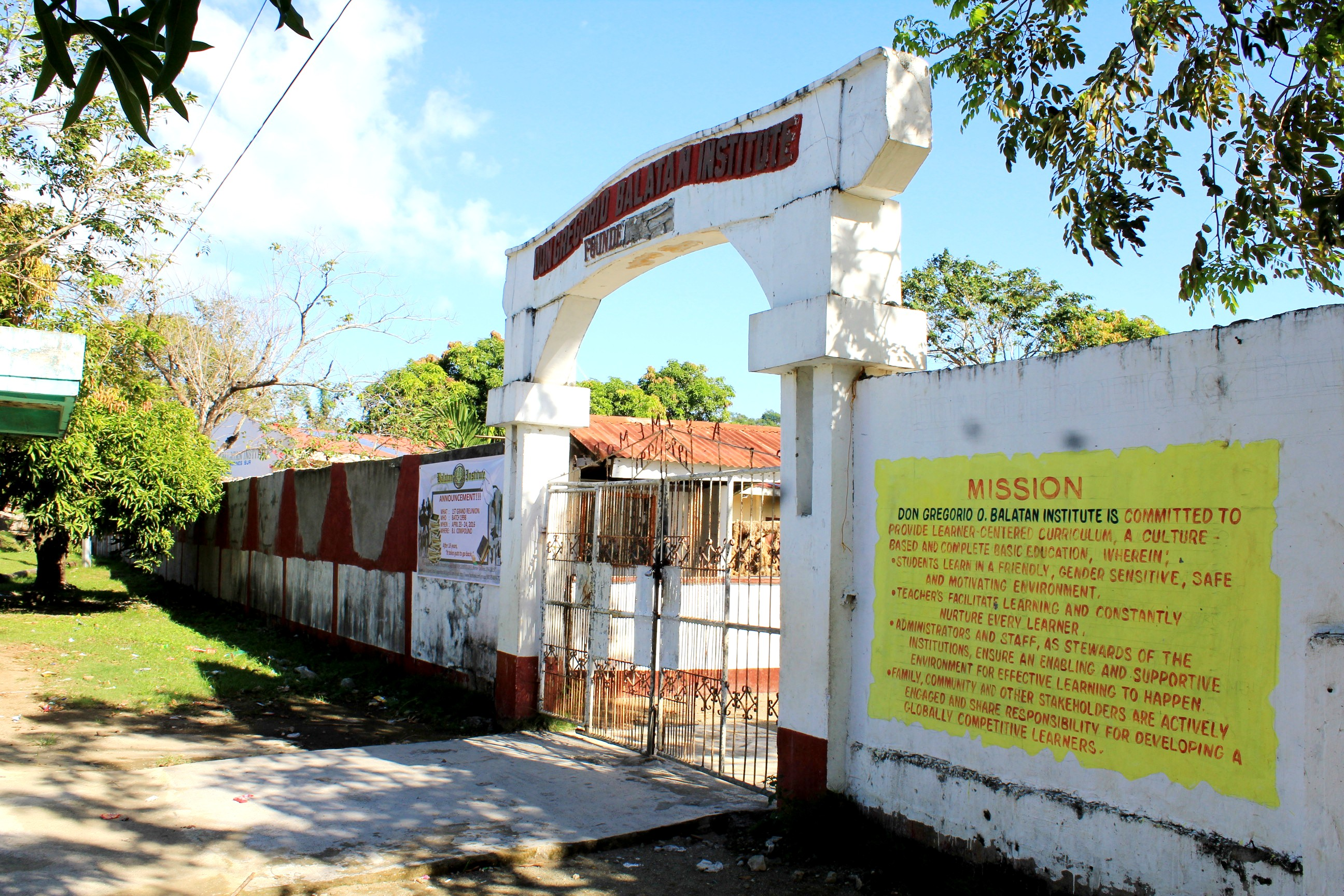
Don Gregorio Balatan Memorial Institute

The Balatan Schools District Office governs all educational institutions within the municipality. It oversees the management and operations of all private and public, from primary to secondary schools.

=== Primary and elementary schools ===
- Bagong Lipunan Elementary School
- Balatan Adventist Elementary School
- Balatan Central School
- Cabanbanan Elementary School
- Cabungan Elementary School
- Camangahan Elementary School
- Caroche Elementary School
- Cayogcog Elementary School
- Coguit Elementary School
- Duran Elementary School
- Maguiron Elementary School
- Nacacale Elementary School
- PARARAO Elementary School
- Pulang Daga Elementary School
- San Francisco Elementary School
- Santiago Elementary School
- Tapayas Elementary School
- Tomatarayo Elementary School

=== Secondary schools ===
- Coguit Provincial High School
- Don Gregorio O. Balatan Institute
- Laganac High School
- Mother Theresa Colegio De Balatan
- Pararao National High School
- Pulang Daga National High School
- Tapayas National High School
