= Luigi Villafuerte =

Filipino politician (born 1996)

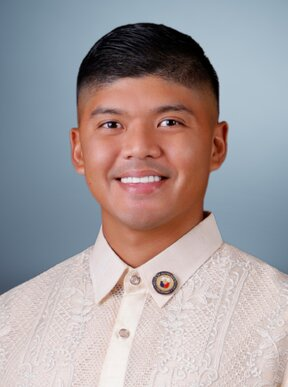
- Official portrait, 2025

Deputy Majority Leader of the House of Representatives of the Philippines
- Incumbent
- Assumed office July 29, 2025 Serving with several others
- House Speaker: Martin Romualdez

Member of the Philippine House of Representatives from Camarines Sur's 2nd district
- Incumbent
- Assumed office June 30, 2025
- Preceded by: Luis Raymund Villafuerte

Governor of Camarines Sur
- In office June 30, 2022 – June 30, 2025
- Vice Governor: Salvio Patrick Fortuno Jr.
- Preceded by: Miguel Luis Villafuerte
- Succeeded by: Luis Raymund Villafuerte

Personal details
- Born: Vincenzo Renato Luis Reyes Villafuerte; November 7, 1996 (age 29) Makati, Philippines
- Party: NUP (2024-present)
- Other political affiliations: PDP (2021-2024)
- Relations: Luis Villafuerte, Sr. (grandfather); Luis Raymund Villafuerte (father); Miguel Luis Villafuerte (brother)
- Education: New York University (BA)
- Occupation: Politician

Vincenzo Renato Luigi Reyes Villafuerte (born November 7, 1996) is a Filipino politician who has served as the Representative of Camarines Sur's 2nd district since 2025. He was served as Governor of Camarines Sur from 2022 to 2025.

== Early life and education ==
Vincenzo Renato Luigi Reyes Villafuerte was born on November 7, 1996. He is the son of current Governor Luis Raymund Villafuerte, and brother to former Governor & current Representative Miguel Luis Villafuerte. He is the grandson of former Representative & former Governor Luis Villafuerte and Nelly Favis-Villafuerte. He graduated from New York University with a degree in political science and a minor in Computer Science.

== Political career ==
Villafuerte defeated incumbent vice governor Imelda Papin, former Representative Rolando Andaya Jr., and two independents in the 2022 Camarines Sur gubernatorial election. His win helped end the run of the Andaya and Alfelor families in Camarines Sur politics, perpetuating the Villafuerte clan.

== Personal life ==
Villafuerte started a relationship with actress Yassi Pressman in September 2023. They engaged on July 18, 2026.

Political offices
Preceded by Miguel Luis Villafuerte	Governor of Camarines Sur; 2022–2025	Succeeded by Luis Raymund Villafuerte
