= Geoffrey Madell =

Scottish philosopher

- Born: 4 February 1934
- Died: 8 March 2018 (aged 84)
- Occupation: Philosopher

Geoffrey Madell (4 February 1934 – 8 March 2018) was a Scottish philosopher who specialized in philosophy of mind and the question of personal identity.

Madell was Senior Lecturer in Philosophy at the University of Edinburgh. He authored articles for Mind and the Philosophy journal. He defended Cartesian dualism in his book Mind and Materialism, published in 1988. He commented that "interactionist dualism looks to be by far the only plausible framework in which the facts of our experience can be fitted".

== Selected publications ==
- The Identity of the Self (Edinburgh University Press, 1981)
- Mind and Materialism (Edinburgh University Press, 1988)
- Personal Identity and the Mind-Body Problem in J. R. Smythies and John Beloff. The Case for Dualism (University Press of Virginia, 1989)
- Philosophy, Music and Emotion (Edinburgh University Press, 2002)
- The Essence of the Self: In Defense of the Simple View of Personal Identity (Routledge, 2014)
