= Madel Alfelor =

Filipino politician (born 1970)

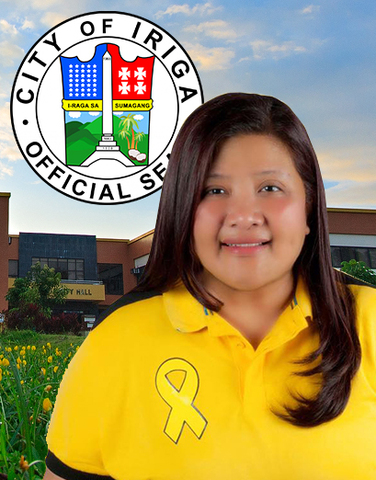
- Official portrait, 2009

Mayor of Iriga
- In office June 30, 2007 – June 30, 2013
- Preceded by: Emmanuel R. Alfelor
- Succeeded by: Ronald Felix Y. Alfelor
- In office June 30, 2016 – June 30, 2022
- Preceded by: Ronald Felix Y. Alfelor
- Succeeded by: Rex C. Oliva

Personal details
- Party: NPC (2021–present)
- Other political affiliations: Liberal (2012–2021); Lakas (2008–2012); KAMPI (2007–2008)
- Parent(s): Ciriaco R. Alfelor; Alma Y. Alfelor
- Education: University of the Philippines Diliman; De La Salle University

Madelaine "Madel" Yorobe Alfelor-Gazmen (born September 7, 1970) is a Filipino politician who previously served as City Mayor of Iriga from 2007 to 2013, and again from 2016 to 2022.

== Personal life ==
Madel Alfelor is the daughter of former congressman Ceriaco R. Alfelor who served as Regular Batasang Pambansa from June 30, 1984 to March 25, 1986. He later represented the fourth district of Camarines Sur at the House of Representatives of the Philippines from June 30, 1987 to June 30, 1998. and Alma Yorobe Alfelor a Doctor of Medicine.

Her grandfather, Felix Ordas Alfelor Jr. also served as Mayor of Iriga from 1938 to 1940 and Governor of Camarines Sur from 1971 to 1978.

== Political career ==
Madel Alfelor began her political career when she was elected as the first Female City Mayor of Iriga from June 30, 2007 to June 30, 2013 and from June 30, 2016 until June 30, 2022 and regarded as the city-youngest mayor elected.

On March 23, 2022, she was awarded as a Resilience Champion by the National Resilience Council for her efforts in terms of sustainability and resilience in the City of Iriga.

In 2022, she ran for Congressional post of the 5th District of Camarines Sur against Governor Miguel Luis Villafuerte, but lost.

== Controversy ==
During a House panel hearing in 2020, Camarines Sur 2nd district Rep. LRay Villafuerte alleged that Alfelor committed violations and "gross abuse" in distributing emergency cash aid under the national government's Social Amelioration Program (SAP).
