= Miguel Luis Villafuerte =

Filipino model and politician

Migz Villafuerte
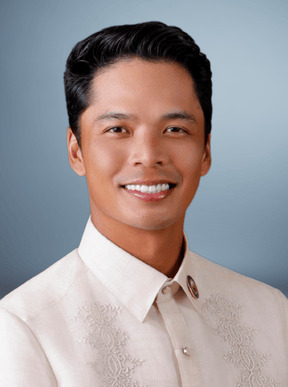
- Official portrait, 2025

Member of the Philippine House of Representatives from Camarines Sur's 5th district
- Incumbent
- Assumed office June 30, 2022
- Preceded by: Jocelyn Fortuno

Governor of Camarines Sur
- In office June 30, 2013 – June 30, 2022
- Vice Governor: Fortunato Peña (2013–2019); Romulo Hernandez (2019); Imelda Papin (2019–2022)
- Preceded by: Luis Raymund Villafuerte
- Succeeded by: Vincenzo Renato Luigi Villafuerte

Personal details
- Born: Miguel Luis Reyes Villafuerte; January 21, 1989 (age 37) Makati, Philippines
- Party: NUP (2024–present)
- Other political affiliations: PDP (2018–2024); Nacionalista (2012–2018)
- Spouse: Rachel Peters (m. 2021)
- Relations: Luis Villafuerte, Sr. (grandfather); Luis Raymund Villafuerte (father); Vincenzo Renato Luigi Villafuerte (brother)
- Children: 2
- Education: University of San Diego (BA)
- Occupation: Politician, model

Miguel Luis "Migz" Reyes Villafuerte (Tagalog: [migs bɪljaˈpwɛɾtɛ]) (born January 21, 1989) is a Filipino politician and model who has served as the Representative of Camarines Sur's 5th district since 2022. He was served as Governor of Camarines Sur from 2013 to 2022. He graduated from the University of San Diego with a Bachelor of Arts degree in political science.

He is from the Villafuerte clan; his grandfather, Luis Villafuerte, was a congressman from 2004 to 2013 and former governor of the same province from 1988 to 1992 and from 1995 to 2004. His father is Luis Raymund Villafuerte, who served as a governor from 2004 to 2013, while his paternal grandmother, Nelly Favis Villafuerte, is a former member of the Monetary Board.

== Political career ==
Villafuerte was elected Governor of Camarines Sur in 2013, defeating his grandfather Luis Villafuerte. At the age of 24, he is the youngest elected governor in Philippine history, surpassing Mark Lapid. Along with Jolo Revilla (then Vice-Governor of Cavite), Villafuerte is among the youngest politicians elected in the 2013 polls. He was reelected to office in the 2016 and 2019 polls, while his father was likewise elected to Congress as Camarines Sur Representative. His grandfather, on the other hand, lost his Congressional bid during the 2016 and 2019 elections.

== Personal life ==
In July 2021, Villafuerte married model and former beauty pageant titleholder Rachel Peters in a civil ceremony. In October 2021, Peters gave birth to their first child. Their second child, a boy, was born in July 2023.
