= Nueva Camarines =

- Proposed province
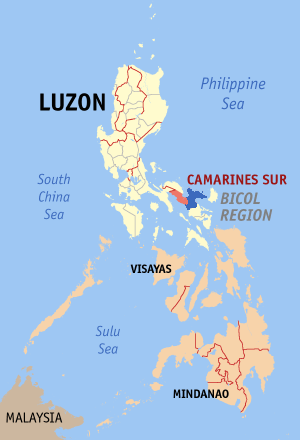
- Map of the Philippines showing the location of Camarines Sur with Nueva Camarines highlighted in blue.

- Map of Camarines Sur with municipalities included in Nueva Camarines highlighted in red.
- Country: Philippines
- Region: Bicol Region (Region V)
- Capital: Tigaon

Area
  - Total: 2,220.30 km^{2} (857.26 sq mi)

Divisions
  - Independent cities: 0
  - Component cities: 1
  - Municipalities: 17
  - Barangays: 487
  - Districts: 4th to 5th districts of Camarines Sur
- Time zone: UTC+8 (PHT)
- ZIP Code: 4400-4436
- Spoken languages: Central Bicolano, Rinconada Bicolano, Albay Bicolano, Tagalog, English, Mt. Isarog Agta, and Mt. Iriga Agta

Nueva Camarines is a proposed province of the Philippines to be created out of Camarines Sur in the Bicol Region of the island of Luzon. The proposed province would border Camarines Sur to the west, the Philippine Sea to the north, Albay to the south, and to the east the island province of Catanduanes across Maqueda Channel. Its capital is expected to be Tigaon if the bill is passed.

House Bill 4820, which could have created the province passed the House of Representatives of the Philippines with 229 votes in favor to one against in 2011. However, at the end of 15th Congress, it failed to pass to the Senate, and was never ratified. In the 16th Congress under the former Representative Felix William Fuentebella, a bill was filed to repropose the creation of the province, but due to the lack of support from former Camarines Sur Representatives Leni Robredo and Salvio Fortuno, the proposal failed as well. Another bill was filed in the 18th Congress, 19th Congress and 20th Congress under Representative Arnulf Bryan Fuentebella.

The bill was originally introduced by Congressman Arnulfo Fuentebella who currently represents the area of the new province in the House of Representatives and co-authored by fellow Camarines Sur Congressmen Rolando Andaya Jr., Diosdado Ignacio Arroyo and Luis Villafuerte, but is opposed by the Camarines Sur Governor Luis Raymond Villafuerte, and Representative Salvio Fortuno.

The proposed province would be created in the Partido region, where the Partido Development Administration is active.

== Proposed territory ==
- Baao
- Balatan
- Bato
- Buhi
- Bula
- Caramoan
- Garchitorena
- Goa
- Iriga City
- Lagonoy
- Nabua
- Presentacion
- Sagñay
- San Jose
- Siruma
- Tigaon (proposed capital)
- Tinambac
