= Camarines Sur's 3rd congressional district =

House of Representatives of the Philippines legislative district

- Constituency for the House of Representatives of the Philippines
- Boundary of congressional district in city/province

- Location of Camarines Sur within the Philippines
- Province: Camarines Sur
- Region: Bicol Region
- Population: 554,323 (2020)
- Electorate: 336,042 (2022)
- Major settlements: 8 LGUs: Cities; Naga; Municipalities; Bombon; Calabanga; Camaligan; Canaman; Magarao; Ocampo; Pili
- Area: 614.51 km^{2} (237.26 sq mi)

Current constituency
- Created: 1987
- Representative: Nelson Legacion
- Political party: NPC
- Congressional bloc: Majority

Camarines Sur's 3rd congressional district is one of the five congressional districts of the Philippines in the province of Camarines Sur. It has been represented in the House of Representatives since 1987. The district consists of the provincial capital Pili, its largest city Naga, and adjacent municipalities of Bombon, Calabanga, Camaligan, Canaman, Magarao and Ocampo. It is currently represented in the 20th Congress by Nelson Legacion of the Nationalist People's Coalition (NPC).

== Representation history ==
#	Image	Member	Term of office		Congress	Party	Electoral history	Constituent LGUs
#	Image	Member	Start	End	Congress	Party	Electoral history	Constituent LGUs
=== Camarines Sur's 3rd district for the House of Representatives of the Philippines ===
District created February 2, 1987.
1		Eduardo P. Pilapil	June 30, 1987	June 30, 1992	8th	Lakas ng Bansa	Elected in 1987.	1987–2010; Caramoan, Garchitorena, Goa, Lagonoy, Presentacion, Sagñay, San Jose, Siruma, Tigaon, Tinambac
2		Arnulfo Fuentebella	June 30, 1992	June 30, 2001	9th	NPC	Elected in 1992.	1987–2010; Caramoan, Garchitorena, Goa, Lagonoy, Presentacion, Sagñay, San Jose, Siruma, Tigaon, Tinambac
2		Arnulfo Fuentebella	June 30, 1992	June 30, 2001	10th	NPC	Re-elected in 1995.	1987–2010; Caramoan, Garchitorena, Goa, Lagonoy, Presentacion, Sagñay, San Jose, Siruma, Tigaon, Tinambac
2		Arnulfo Fuentebella	June 30, 1992	June 30, 2001	11th	NPC	Re-elected in 1998.	1987–2010; Caramoan, Garchitorena, Goa, Lagonoy, Presentacion, Sagñay, San Jose, Siruma, Tigaon, Tinambac
3		Felix William Fuentebella	June 30, 2001	June 30, 2004	12th	NPC	Elected in 2001.	1987–2010; Caramoan, Garchitorena, Goa, Lagonoy, Presentacion, Sagñay, San Jose, Siruma, Tigaon, Tinambac
(2)		Arnulfo Fuentebella	June 30, 2004	June 30, 2010	13th	NPC	Elected in 2004.	1987–2010; Caramoan, Garchitorena, Goa, Lagonoy, Presentacion, Sagñay, San Jose, Siruma, Tigaon, Tinambac
(2)		Arnulfo Fuentebella	June 30, 2004	June 30, 2010	14th	NPC	Re-elected in 2007. Redistricted to the 4th district.	1987–2010; Caramoan, Garchitorena, Goa, Lagonoy, Presentacion, Sagñay, San Jose, Siruma, Tigaon, Tinambac
4		Luis Villafuerte	June 30, 2010	June 30, 2013	15th	NPC	Redistricted from the 2nd district and re-elected in 2010.	2010–present Bombon, Calabanga, Camaligan, Canaman, Magarao, Naga, Ocampo, Pili
5		Leni Robredo	June 30, 2013	June 30, 2016	16th	Liberal	Elected in 2013.	2010–present Bombon, Calabanga, Camaligan, Canaman, Magarao, Naga, Ocampo, Pili
6		Gabriel Bordado	June 30, 2016	June 30, 2025	17th	Liberal	Elected in 2016.	2010–present Bombon, Calabanga, Camaligan, Canaman, Magarao, Naga, Ocampo, Pili
6		Gabriel Bordado	June 30, 2016	June 30, 2025	18th	Liberal	Re-elected in 2019.	2010–present Bombon, Calabanga, Camaligan, Canaman, Magarao, Naga, Ocampo, Pili
6		Gabriel Bordado	June 30, 2016	June 30, 2025	19th	Liberal	Re-elected in 2022.	2010–present Bombon, Calabanga, Camaligan, Canaman, Magarao, Naga, Ocampo, Pili
7		Nelson Legacion	June 30, 2025	Incumbent	20th	Lakas	Elected in 2025.	2010–present Bombon, Calabanga, Camaligan, Canaman, Magarao, Naga, Ocampo, Pili
7		Nelson Legacion	June 30, 2025	Incumbent	20th	NPC	Elected in 2025.	2010–present Bombon, Calabanga, Camaligan, Canaman, Magarao, Naga, Ocampo, Pili

== Election results ==
=== 2025 ===
2025 Philippine House of Representatives election in Camarines Sur's 3rd District
Party	Candidate	Votes	%
Lakas	Nelson Legacion	111,839	43.43
NUP	Ernesto Raoul Villafuerte Magtuto Jr.	108,200	42.01
Kusog Bikolandia	Noel De Luna	33,711	13.09
Independent	Juan Agapito Mariano Tria II	2,319	0.9
Independent	Jarrell Avila Losa	930	0.36
Independent	Salome Delsocorro Togñi	525	0.20
Total votes		257,524	100.00
Lakas gain from Liberal			

=== 2022 ===
2022 Philippine House of Representatives election in Camarines Sur's 3rd District
Party	Candidate	Votes	%
Liberal	Gabriel Bordado	140,357	58.00
PDDS	Noel De Luna	51,377	21.23
Lakas	Sulpicio Roco, Jr.	29,184	12.06
Aksyon	Jose Anselmo Cadiz	10,780	4.45
Independent	Juan Agapito Tria II	10,297	4.26
Total votes		241,995	100.00
Liberal hold			

=== 2019 ===
2019 Philippine House of Representatives election in Camarines Sur's 3rd District
Party	Candidate	Votes	%
Liberal	Gabriel Bordado	102,929	47.72
Nacionalista	Luis Villafuerte	81,304	37.70
PDP–Laban	Sulpicio Roco, Jr.	31,446	14.58
Total votes		215,679	100.00
Liberal hold			

=== 2016 ===
2016 Philippine House of Representatives election in Camarines Sur's 3rd District
Party	Candidate	Votes	%
Liberal	Gabriel Bordado	100,127	47.61
NPC	Luis Villafuerte	81,074	38.85
Invalid or blank votes		28,463	13.53
Total votes		209,664	100.00
Liberal hold			

=== 2013 ===
Page information

2013 Philippine House of Representatives election at Camarines Sur's 3rd district
Party	Candidate	Votes	%
Liberal	Leni Robredo	92,822	69.93
NPC	Nelly Villafuerte	35,160	19.85
Independent	Charina Fausto	2,296	1.30
PDP–Laban	Oscar Arcilla, Jr.	640	0.36
Margin of victory		88,683	50.08
Invalid or blank votes		15,155	8.56
Total votes		177,094	100.00
Liberal gain from NPC			

=== 2010 ===
Philippine House of Representatives election at Camarines Sur's 3rd district
Party	Candidate	Votes	%
NPC	Luis Villafuerte	91,109	70.11
Liberal	Jaime Jacob	35,927	19.97
Lakas–Kampi	Oscar Nonito Arcilla	2,425	1.35
Valid ballots		164,468	91.43
Invalid or blank votes		15,419	8.57
Total votes		179,887	100.00
NPC hold			

== See also ==
- Legislative districts of Camarines Sur

House of Representatives of the Philippines
Preceded by Las Piñas's at-large congressional district	Home district of the speaker November 13, 2000 – January 24, 2001	Succeeded by Quezon City's 4th congressional district
