= Legislative districts of Camarines Sur =

Legislative district of the Philippines

Camarines Sur divided into five districts

The legislative districts of Camarines Sur are the representations of the province of Camarines Sur and the independent city of Naga in the various national legislatures of the Philippines. The province and the city are currently represented in the lower house of the Congress of the Philippines through their first, second, third, fourth, and fifth congressional districts.

== History ==
Camarines Sur was represented as part of Ambos Camarines until it was granted its own representations in 1919. It was divided into two legislative districts until 1972. It was part of the representation of Region V from 1978 to 1984, and from 1984 to 1986, it elected 4 assemblymen at-large. In 1986, it was redistricted into four legislative districts.

The passage of Republic Act 9716 created an additional district out of towns from the first and second districts, which elected its first representative starting in the 2010 elections. As a result, the numerical designations of the province's districts were also changed in order to accommodate the new district. Then-Senator Noynoy Aquino challenged the controversial law in court, arguing its alleged unconstitutionality because the reapportionment creates a district that does not meet the 250,000 population requirement outlined in the Constitution. However, the Supreme Court deemed that the creation of a district not meeting the 250,000 population requirement in the constitution is a rule only applicable to cities, not provinces, and therefore ruled that the district is constitutional.

== Current districts ==
Political parties

NUP (3)
NPC (2)

Legislative districts and representatives of Camarines Sur
| District | Current Representative | Party | Constituent LGUs | Population (2020) | Area | Map |
|---|---|---|---|---|---|---|
| 1st | Hori Horibata (since 2022); Ragay | NUP | List: Cabusao; Del Gallego; Lupi; Ragay; Sipocot | 207,496 | 1,097.88 km² | |
| 2nd | Luigi Villafuerte (since 2025); Libmanan | NUP | List: Gainza; Libmanan; Milaor; Minalabac; Pamplona; Pasacao; San Fernando | 343,942 | 819.21 km² | |
| 3rd | Nelson Legacion (since 2025); City of Naga | NPC | List: Bombon; Calabanga; Camaligan; Canaman; Magarao; Naga; Ocampo; Pili | 554,323 | 614.51 km² | |
| 4th | Arnulf Bryan Fuentebella (since 2019); Tigaon | NPC | List: Caramoan; Garchitorena; Goa; Lagonoy; Presentacion; Sagñay; San Jose; Siruma; Tigaon; Tinambac | 420,838 | 2,010.75 km² | |
| 5th | Miguel Luis Villafuerte (since 2022); Iriga | NUP | List: Baao; Balatan; Bato; Buhi; Bula; Iriga; Nabua | 499,713 | 954.68 km² | |

== At-Large (defunct) ==
=== 1943–1944 ===
| Period | Assemblymen |
|---|---|
| National Assembly; 1943–1944 | Jose T. Fuentebella |
| National Assembly; 1943–1944 | Andres T. Hernandez |

=== 1984–1986 ===
| Period | Assemblymen |
|---|---|
| Regular Batasang Pambansa; 1984–1986 | Ciriaco R. Alfelor |
| Regular Batasang Pambansa; 1984–1986 | Rolando R. Andaya |
| Regular Batasang Pambansa; 1984–1986 | Edmundo B. Cea |
| Regular Batasang Pambansa; 1984–1986 | Luis R. Villafuerte, Sr. |

== See also ==
- Legislative districts of Ambos Camarines
