= Evelyn Fuentebella =

Mayor of Sagñay
- In office June 30, 2010 – June 30, 2019
- Preceded by: Roberto Briones
- Succeeded by: John Vincent Fuentebella

Personal details
- Born: Evelyn Buquid; September 15, 1945 (age 80) Baybay City, Leyte
- Party: Nationalist People's Coalition
- Spouse: Arnulfo Fuentebella

Evelyn Buquid Fuentebella (born September 15, 1945) widely known as Nanay Belen, is the Municipal Mayor of Sagñay in the province of Camarines Sur, Philippines, serving from 2010 until 2019. She is the wife of former Speaker of the Philippine House of Representatives Arnulfo Fuentebella.

== Early life and education ==
Evelyn Buquid was born on September 15, 1945, in Sagñay to former Camarines Sur Provincial Board Member and COMELEC Regional Chairman Atty. William F. Buquid and longest sitting former mayor of Bato, Camarines Sur, Hermenegilda Yared Buquid

== Career ==
Before she entered politics, Fuentebella worked as an executive assistant to then Prime Minister of the Philippines and Minister of Finance Cesar E. A. Virata.

In 2010, she ran as Municipal Mayor of Sagñay winning by a large margin of votes. On May 12, 2016, Fuentebella won her third term as mayor of Sagnay by a landslide.

== Personal life ==
Fuentebella is married to former Speaker of the Philippine House of Representatives Arnulfo P. Fuentebella and they have four sons and two daughters, two of whom are also in politics: Tigaon Municipal Mayor Arnulf Bryan B. Fuentebella. and Camarines Sur's 4th District Representative Felix William B. Fuentebella.
