= Arnulfo Fuentebella =

Speaker of the House of Representatives of the Philippines from 2000 to 2001

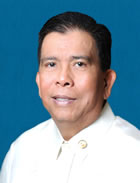
- Official portrait, 2016

19th Speaker of the House of Representatives of the Philippines
- In office November 13, 2000 – January 24, 2001
- Preceded by: Manny Villar
- Succeeded by: Feliciano Belmonte Jr.

Deputy Speaker of the House of Representatives of the Philippines
- In office July 26, 2010 – June 30, 2013

Member of the House of Representatives from Camarines Sur's 4th district
- In office June 30, 2016 – June 30, 2019
- Preceded by: Felix William Fuentebella
- Succeeded by: Arnulf Bryan Fuentebella
- In office June 30, 2010 – June 30, 2013
- Preceded by: Felix William Fuentebella
- Succeeded by: Felix William Fuentebella

Member of the House of Representatives from Camarines Sur's 3rd district
- In office June 30, 2004 – June 30, 2010
- Preceded by: Felix William Fuentebella
- Succeeded by: Felix William Fuentebella
- In office June 30, 1992 – June 30, 2001
- Preceded by: Eduardo Pilapil
- Succeeded by: Felix William Fuentebella

Member of the Interim Batasang Pambansa
- In office June 12, 1978 – June 5, 1984
- Constituency: Region V

Personal details
- Born: Arnulfo Palma Fuentebella; October 29, 1945 Goa, Camarines Sur, Commonwealth of the Philippines
- Died: September 9, 2020 (aged 74) Quezon City, Philippines
- Party: Nationalist People's Coalition (1992–2020)
- Other political affiliations: Kilusang Bagong Lipunan (1978–1992)
- Spouse: Evelyn Buquid
- Children: 6, including Felix and Arnulf
- Education: University of the Philippines Diliman (LL.B)
- Occupation: Politician
- Profession: Lawyer

Arnulfo Palma Fuentebella (October 29, 1945 – September 9, 2020) was the Speaker of the Philippine House of Representatives from 2000 to 2001. He was born in Camarines Sur to former Governor Felix Fuentebella. He graduated in the University of the Philippines and later became a banker. He later represented of the 3rd (now 4th) district of Camarines Sur, more popularly known as the Partido district. He became the speaker for a year.

== Early life and education ==
Arnulfo "Noli" Fuentebella was born on October 29, 1945, in Camarines Sur to former Representative and Governor Felix A. Fuentebella and Rita Palma. He was educated in his home province and spent most of his life in scouting until he reached Life Scout. At the age of 15, Fuentebella was a Philippine delegate to the 50th anniversary of the Boy Scouts of America in 1960. He studied political science and law at the University of the Philippines College of Law in 1970. He ranked 7th in his class upon graduation and passed the Bar Exams in 1971.

== Career ==
After he passed the Bar Exams, Fuentebella pursued a career in law and banking. But after President Ferdinand E. Marcos imposed martial rule and called for elections to the Interim Batasang Pambansa (IBP), Fuentebella was chosen by the President to run in Congress to represent Partido. He subsequently won the elections and served as an assemblyman in the IBP from 1978 to 1984. However, he lost his bid for a seat in the 1984 Regular Batasang Pambansa and used the hiatus to practice law in New York, where he was admitted to the State Bar. Then the EDSA Revolution happened and President Marcos fled into exile. As the Fuentebellas had been identified with the Marcoses, he opted to sit out the Cory Aquino years.

In 1992, political allies asked Fuentebella to run again in Congress. He won three consecutive terms as Congressman (1992–2001).

=== Speakership ===
After then Speaker Manuel Villar, Jr. passed President Joseph Estrada's Articles of Impeachment to the Senate, Fuentebella was elected Speaker after Estrada's allies in the House of Representatives motioned to make all positions in the House vacant; Fuentebella won the nomination.

On January 20, 2001, during the Second EDSA Revolution, Estrada left the Malacañan Palace and Vice President Gloria Macapagal Arroyo was sworn to the presidency at the EDSA Shrine by Chief Justice Hilario Davide, Jr. Accompanying Davide were the chairs of the two houses of Congress, Senate President Aquilino Pimentel, Jr. and Speaker Fuentebella. Four days later, on January 24, Fuentebella opted not to run again for Speaker and the Arroyo allies mustered enough votes to elect as Speaker Quezon City representative Feliciano Belmonte.

=== Post-speakership ===
When Fuentebella had served the maximum three consecutive terms as a congressman, his son Felix William/Wimpy took over for one term (2001–2004). In the interim, Fuentebella took up post-graduate courses at the Kennedy School of Governance of Harvard University. He ran again for Congress and won three more consecutive terms (2004–2013). He was instrumental in the proposed creation of a new province to be called Nueva Camarines, which will be composed of the fourth and fifth congressional Districts of Camarines Sur.

In the 14th and 15th Congresses, Fuentebella was elected Deputy Speaker of the House of Representatives of the Philippines for Luzon.

In May 2016, Fuentebella was again elected as Camarines Sur fourth district representative, after another term was served by his son, Felix William. In 2019, he retired from politics.

== Death ==
He died on September 9, 2020. His son said he succumbed to heart failure after battling kidney disease for almost two years. His death received condolences from the Malacañang Palace, with presidential spokesperson Harry Roque stating, “The time and effort he gave to improve the condition of his beloved district will always be remembered by his constituents".

== Legacy ==
The Speaker Arnulfo ‘Noli’ Fuentebella Highway, which runs from Goa to Siruma was named in his honor in 2024.
