= DZRP =

DZRP is a call sign assigned to two radio stations in the Philippines:

- DZRP-FM, an FM radio station broadcasting in Partido with the brand Radyo Partido
- DZRP (shortwave), a shortwave radio station located in Quezon City under the brand Radyo Pilipinas World Service
