= Malabungot =

Island of the Philippines

- Location within Philippines

Geography
- Location: 0.6 kilometers (0.37 mi) off Caramoan Peninsula
- Coordinates: 13.9250°N 123.5889°E
- Archipelago: Philippines

Administration
- Philippines

Malabungot, alternatively spelled as Malabungut, and also known as Mahad, is an island in Binagasbasan Bay off the coast of Garchitorena in Camarines Sur, Philippines. It is separated from Caramoan Peninsula in the south by the Quinalasag Passage, also known as Sisiran Passage, which connects Lamit and Sisiran bays. The island forms the head of Binagasbasan Bay, bordered to the west by the Lamit Islands and to the east by Quinalasag Island, and which opens northward to the Philippine Sea. It is designated as a protected landscape and seascape on account of its biodiversity and ecological significance.

== Geography ==
Malabungot is one of several small islands lying off the coast of Caramoan Peninsula shared between the municipalities of Garchitorena, Caramoan and Lagonoy in the Partido District of Camarines Sur. It belongs administratively to the Garchitorena barangay of Binagasbasan along with the Lamit Islands, and Pawican and Puling islets in Lamit Bay. The island is largely flat and measures 2.5 kilometres (1.6 mi) long and 1 kilometre (0.62 mi) wide at its widest point. It is situated on the edge of a shore reef in an irregular-shaped bay lying between Quinalasag and Lamit Islands, which are two small islands separated by a narrow impassable channel. It is approximately 0.6 kilometres (0.37 mi) from the mainland of Garchitorena.

== Conservation ==
The island comprises 120.62 hectares (298.1 acres) of lowland evergreen forests and sandy beaches. It is part of a wilderness area established in 1981 comprising the Malabungot, Basot and Quinalang (Quinalasag) islands of Camarines Sur. The area is known for its diverse ecosystems such as vast mangrove forests, seagrass beds and hard coral reefs which serve as feeding and breeding ground for a variety of marine life, including green sea turtles, hawksbill sea turtles, whale sharks, manta rays and dugongs. Several other fish species can be seen here including seahorses, giant clams, swordfish, snappers, groupers and skates.

The wilderness area is also surrounded by thick patches of mangroves that attract birds such as mangrove blue flycatchers, barred rails, zebra doves, kingfishers, Pacific swallows, yellow-vented bulbuls, and chestnut munias.

Despite its status as a marine protected area, these habitats are still threatened by human activities, including dynamite and cyanide fishing due to lack of political and financial support resulting to poor governance and enforcement.
