= Arnulf Bryan Fuentebella =

Filipino politician (born 1976)

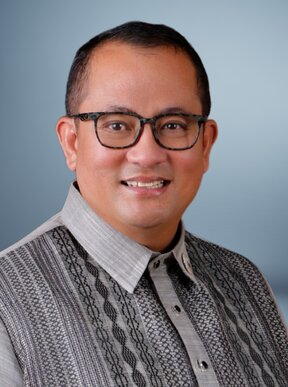
- Official portrait, 2025

Member of the Philippine House of Representatives from Camarines Sur's 4th district
- Incumbent
- Assumed office June 30, 2019
- Preceded by: Arnulfo Fuentebella

Mayor of Tigaon
- In office June 30, 2007 – June 30, 2016
- Preceded by: Elmo Bombase
- Succeeded by: Pamela Fuentebella

Personal details
- Born: Arnulf Bryan Buquid Fuentebella; January 29, 1976 (age 50) Quezon City, Philippines
- Party: NPC (2007–2012; 2016–present)
- Other political affiliations: UNA (2012–2016)
- Education: University of the Philippines Diliman (BA)
- Occupation: Politician

Arnulf Bryan "Arnie" Buquid Fuentebella (born January 29, 1976) is a Filipino politician. He is the incumbent representative of Camarines Sur's 4th district in the Philippines since 2019. He is also the former Municipal Mayor of Tigaon in the province of Camarines Sur from 2007 to 2016.

== Early life and education ==
Arnulf Bryan "Arnie" Fuentebella was born on January 29, 1976, in Tigaon to former Speaker of the Philippine House of Representatives and Congressman Arnulfo "Noli" Fuentebella and Sagñay Municipal Mayor Evelyn B. Fuentebella. His brother is Camarines Sur's 4th district Representative Felix William B. Fuentebella. He graduated in the University of the Philippines Diliman being a Philosophy graduate and a member of the Upsilon Sigma Phi fraternity.

== Political career ==
Fuentebella entered politics after barangay captains of Tigaon asked him to run for mayor in the 2007 elections. He won the elections over the incumbent mayor.

He was instrumental for the proposed creation of a new province to be called as Nueva Camarines, which will be composed of the Fourth and Fifth Legislative Districts of Camarines Sur.

House of Representatives of the Philippines
Preceded by Arnulfo Fuentebella	Member of the House of Representatives from Camarines Sur's 4th district 2019–present	Incumbent
Political offices
Preceded by Elmo Bombase	Mayor of Tigaon, Camarines Sur; 2007–2016	Succeeded by Pamela Fuentebella
