= DZRP-FM =

FMR Camarines Sur (DZRP)
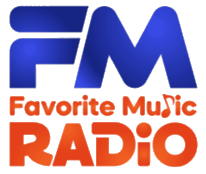
- Goa; Philippines
- Broadcast area: Partido Region and surrounding areas
- Frequency: 94.5 MHz
- Branding: 94.5 FMR

Programming
- Languages: Bicolano, Filipino
- Format: Contemporary MOR, News, Talk
- Network: FMR Philippines
- Affiliations: TV5 News (for Ted Failon at DJ Chacha sa True FM)

Ownership
- Owner: Philippine Collective Media Corporation

History
- First air date: March 10, 2009
- Former call signs: DWRP (2009–2011)
- Former names: Radyo Partido (2009–2023)
- Call sign meaning: Radyo Partido (former branding)

Technical information
- Licensing authority: NTC
- Class: C, D, E
- Power: 10,000 watts

Links
- Website: http://www.pcmc.com.ph

DZRP (94.5 FM), broadcasting as 94.5 FMR, is a radio station owned by and operated by the Philippine Collective Media Corporation. The station's studio is located at Brgy. Matacla, Goa, Camarines Sur, and its transmitter is located in Lagonoy.

== History ==
The station first went on air in 2009 as Radyo Partido. Under the ownership of the Partido Development Administration, it served as a community radio for the Partido district. In October 2021, the Philippine Collective Media Corporation took over the station's operations and rebranded it as FM Radio Partido. In 2025, PCMC acquired the frequency and the "Partido" was dropped from the branding.
