= Felix William Fuentebella =

Philippine politician and government official

Felix William B. Fuentebella
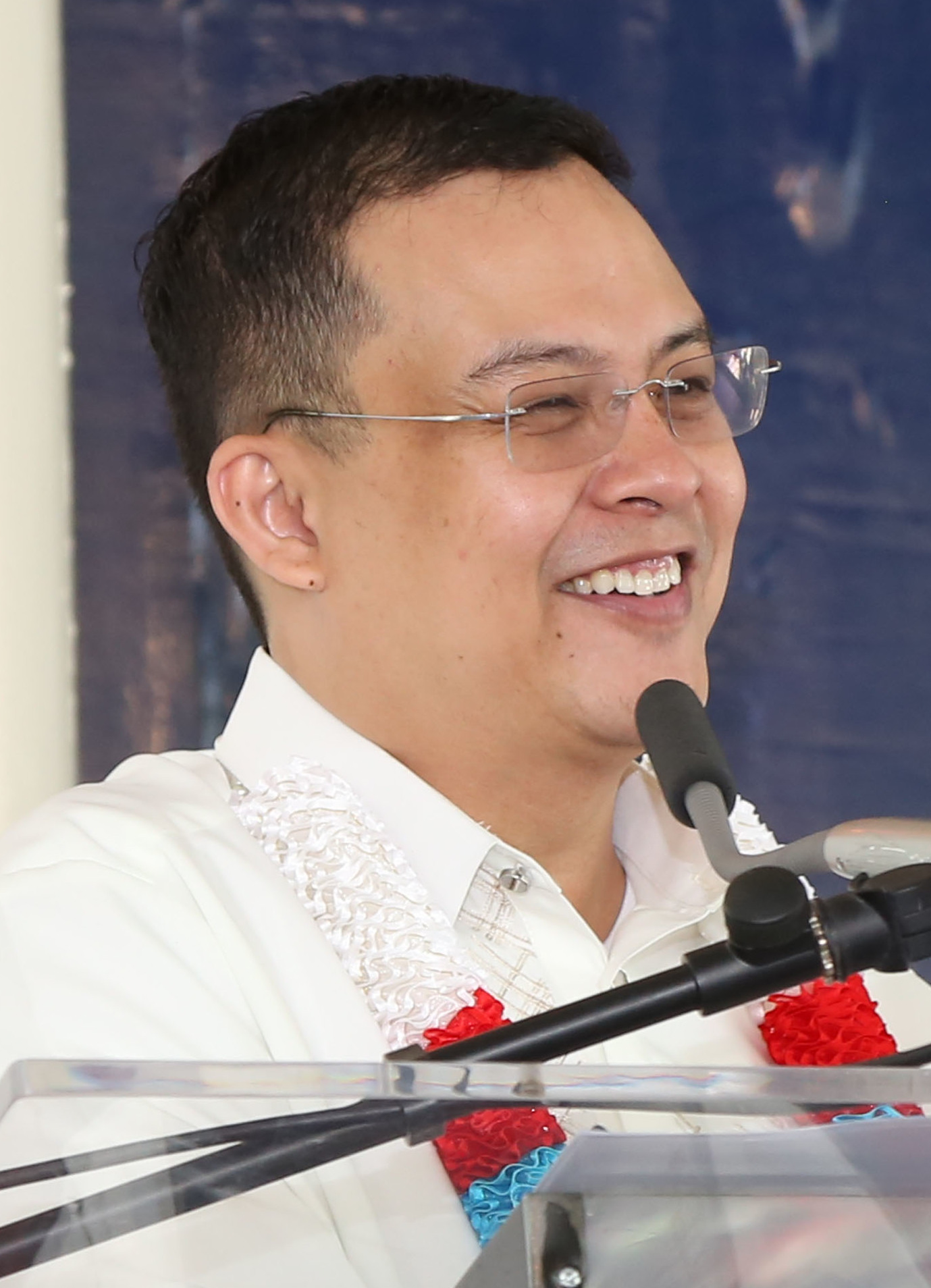
- November 2017

Undersecretary, Department of Energy
- Incumbent
- Assumed office 2017

Member of the Philippine House of Representatives from Camarines Sur
- In office June 30, 2013 – June 30, 2016
- Preceded by: Arnulfo Fuentebella
- Succeeded by: Arnulfo Fuentebella
- Constituency: 4th District
- In office June 30, 2001 – June 30, 2004
- Constituency: 3rd District

Personal details
- Born: Felix William Buquid Fuentebella; February 5, 1975 (age 51) Quezon City, Rizal, Philippines (now Quezon City, Metro Manila, Philippines)
- Party: Nationalist People's Coalition
- Spouse: Geraldine "Giselle" Molina Fuentebella
- Children: Geri Elise Molina Fuentebella
- Education: Ateneo de Manila High School
- Alma mater: University of the Philippines Diliman (BSBA); San Sebastian College – Recoletos (JD)
- Occupation: Teacher, Government Official
- Profession: Lawyer

Felix William Buquid Fuentebella (born February 5, 1975), popularly known as Wimpy, is a Filipino lawyer, a teacher, and government official. He currently serves as Undersecretary of the Department of Energy (DOE). He previously represented the 4th and 3rd districts of Camarines Sur in the Philippine House of Representatives. He teaches Business Law in Virata School Business, University of the Philippines- Diliman.

== Early life and education ==
Fuentebella was born on February 5, 1975, in Quezon City to former Speaker of the House Arnulfo P. Fuentebella and Sagñay Municipal Mayor Evelyn Buquid. He hails from Tigaon, Camarines Sur, and is a fourth-generation politician, tracing his lineage to Mariano Fuentebella, who served as Governor of Ambos Camarines during the American period.

He completed his elementary and high school education at the Ateneo de Manila University (1989–1993) and earned a Bachelor of Science in Business Administration from the University of the Philippines Diliman (1993–1997). He was a member of the Upsilon Sigma Phi fraternity. He began his law degree at the Ateneo Law School (1998–2001) but paused his studies after being elected to Congress. He later completed his law degree at San Sebastian College Recoletos Institute of Law and passed the Bar Exams in 2009. He is a member of the Integrated Bar of the Philippines, the Partido Bar Association, and the Rinconada Bar Association.

== Family ==
Fuentebella is married to Geraldine "Giselle" Molina Fuentebella, and they have a daughter, Geri Elise Molina Fuentebella. His father, Arnulfo P. Fuentebella, is a former Congressman, while his mother, Evelyn Buquid, served as Mayor of Sagñay, Camarines Sur. His siblings include Congressman Arnulf Bryan Fuentebella, John Vincent B. Fuentebella, Eugene Adrian B. Fuentebella, and Tigaon Mayor Pamela Rinah “Chiqui” Fuentebella. His grandfather, Felix A. Fuentebella, was a former Congressman and Governor, and his granduncle, José T. Fuentebella, was a former Senator. His great-grandfather, Mariano Fuentebella, served as Governor of Ambos Camarines during the American period.

== Political and professional career ==
Currently serving as DOE Undersecretary, Fuentebella previously held the roles of Senior Undersecretary (March to June 2022) and Undersecretary (September 2016 to February 2022). His DOE oversight covered Planning, Power, Renewable Energy, and Energy Utilization Management Bureaus, alongside Administrative and IT Management Services.

He led the Task Force on Energy Resiliency and Energy Task Force Election, ensuring stable energy support during the 2022 National and Local Elections. He has represented the Philippines at COP26, COP27, and COP28, defending the nation's climate change stance.

Previously, he served as Deputy Secretary General/Assistant Secretary for Plans, Programs, and Policy at the Housing and Urban Development Coordinating Council (HUDCC) from August 2011 to October 2012. He played a critical role in drafting the Department of Human Settlements and Urban Development Bill, which became RA 11201. He was also Commissioner of the Housing and Land Use Regulatory Board (2010-2011).

Fuentebella began his political career as a Political Affairs Officer in his father's office from 1997 to 2000. In 2001, at the age of 26, he was elected to the Philippine House of Representatives, representing the 3rd District of Camarines Sur. He was the youngest legislator in the 12th Congress of the Philippines and served as its Assistant Majority Floor Leader. During his term, he led investigations into the Judicial Development Fund and together with other young NPC stalwarts filed an impeachment complaint against Chief Justice Hilario Davide, Jr.

He co-authored the Anti-Money Laundering Act (RA 9160) and advocated for amendments to the Procurement Reform Act (RA 9184).

After his father returned to Congress, Fuentebella served as Chief of Staff and Head of Legislative Staff from 2007 to 2010. He also co-chaired the Partido Development Administration (PDA) Board. In 2012, he ran for Congress again, succeeding his father as representative of the 4th District.

In the 2013 Philippine House of Representatives elections, Fuentebella defeated actor-turned-politician Aga Muhlach.

In 2023, he commenced teaching Business Law in the Virata School of Business in the University of the Philippines- Diliman.

== Personal life ==
Fuentebella resides in Abo, Tigaon, Camarines Sur, and Quezon City. He is known by his nickname, "Wimpy."
