= Camarines Sur's 4th congressional district =

Legislative district of the Philippines

- Constituency for the House of Representatives of the Philippines
- Boundary of congressional district in city/province

- Location of Camarines Sur within the Philippines
- Province: Camarines Sur
- Region: Bicol Region
- Population: 462,770 (2020)
- Electorate: 300,303 (2022)
- Major settlements: 10 LGUs: Municipalities; Caramoan; Garchitorena; Goa; Lagonoy; Presentacion; Sagñay; San Jose; Siruma; Tigaon; Tinambac
- Area: 2,010.75 km^{2} (776.35 sq mi)

Current constituency
- Created: 1987
- Representative: Arnulf Bryan Fuentebella
- Political party: NPC
- Congressional bloc: Majority

Camarines Sur's 4th congressional district is one of the five congressional districts of the Philippines in the province of Camarines Sur. It has been represented in the House of Representatives since 1987. The district consists of municipalities in the Partido region of eastern Camarines Sur, namely Caramoan, Garchitorena, Goa, Lagonoy, Presentacion, Sagñay, San Jose, Siruma, Tigaon and Tinambac. It is currently represented in the 20th Congress by Arnulf Bryan Fuentebella of the Nationalist People's Coalition (NPC).

== Representation history ==
#	Image	Member	Term of office		Congress	Party	Electoral history	Constituent LGUs
#	Image	Member	Start	End	Congress	Party	Electoral history	Constituent LGUs
=== Camarines Sur's 4th district for the House of Representatives of the Philippines ===
District created February 2, 1987.
1		Ciriaco R. Alfelor	June 30, 1987	June 30, 1998	8th	PDP–Laban	Elected in 1987.	1987–2010; Baao, Balatan, Bato, Buhi, Bula, Iriga, Nabua
1		Ciriaco R. Alfelor	June 30, 1987	June 30, 1998	9th	Liberal	Re-elected in 1992.	1987–2010; Baao, Balatan, Bato, Buhi, Bula, Iriga, Nabua
1		Ciriaco R. Alfelor	June 30, 1987	June 30, 1998	10th	Liberal	Re-elected in 1995.	1987–2010; Baao, Balatan, Bato, Buhi, Bula, Iriga, Nabua
2		Salvio B. Fortuno	June 30, 1998	June 30, 2001	11th	LAMMP	Elected in 1998.	1987–2010; Baao, Balatan, Bato, Buhi, Bula, Iriga, Nabua
3		Felix R. Alfelor Jr.	June 30, 2001	June 30, 2010	12th	Lakas	Elected in 2001.	1987–2010; Baao, Balatan, Bato, Buhi, Bula, Iriga, Nabua
3		Felix R. Alfelor Jr.	June 30, 2001	June 30, 2010	13th	Lakas	Re-elected in 2004.	1987–2010; Baao, Balatan, Bato, Buhi, Bula, Iriga, Nabua
3		Felix R. Alfelor Jr.	June 30, 2001	June 30, 2010	14th	Lakas	Re-elected in 2007.	1987–2010; Baao, Balatan, Bato, Buhi, Bula, Iriga, Nabua
4		Arnulfo Fuentebella	June 30, 2010	June 30, 2013	15th	NPC	Redistricted from the 3rd district and re-elected in 2010.	2010–present Caramoan, Garchitorena, Goa, Lagonoy, Presentacion, Sagñay, San Jose, Siruma, Tigaon, Tinambac
5		Felix William Fuentebella	June 30, 2013	June 30, 2016	16th	NPC	Elected in 2013.	2010–present Caramoan, Garchitorena, Goa, Lagonoy, Presentacion, Sagñay, San Jose, Siruma, Tigaon, Tinambac
(4)		Arnulfo Fuentebella	June 30, 2016	June 30, 2019	17th	NPC	Elected in 2016.	2010–present Caramoan, Garchitorena, Goa, Lagonoy, Presentacion, Sagñay, San Jose, Siruma, Tigaon, Tinambac
6		Arnulf Bryan Fuentebella	June 30, 2019	Incumbent	18th	NPC	Elected in 2019.	2010–present Caramoan, Garchitorena, Goa, Lagonoy, Presentacion, Sagñay, San Jose, Siruma, Tigaon, Tinambac
6		Arnulf Bryan Fuentebella	June 30, 2019	Incumbent	19th	NPC	Re-elected in 2022.	2010–present Caramoan, Garchitorena, Goa, Lagonoy, Presentacion, Sagñay, San Jose, Siruma, Tigaon, Tinambac
6		Arnulf Bryan Fuentebella	June 30, 2019	Incumbent	20th	NPC	Re-elected in 2025.	2010–present Caramoan, Garchitorena, Goa, Lagonoy, Presentacion, Sagñay, San Jose, Siruma, Tigaon, Tinambac

== Election results ==
=== 2025 ===
2025 Philippine House of Representatives elections
Party	Candidate	Votes	%
NPC	Arnulf Bryan Fuentebella	144,731	56.11
NUP	Marco Gabriel Gumabao	113,229	43.89
Total votes		257,960	100
NPC hold			

=== 2022 ===
2022 Philippine House of Representatives elections
Party	Candidate	Votes	%
NPC	Arnulf Bryan Fuentebella	132,310	58.60
PDP–Laban	Antonio B. Chavez	93,457	41.39
Total votes		225,767	100
NPC hold			

=== 2019 ===
2019 Philippine House of Representatives elections
Party	Candidate	Votes	%
NPC	Arnulf Bryan Fuentebella	120,464	56.08
Nacionalista	Ernesto Raoul Villafuerte Magtuto Jr.	94,334	43.92
Total votes		214,798	100
NPC hold			

=== 2016 ===
2016 Philippine House of Representatives elections
Party	Candidate	Votes	%
NPC	Arnulfo Fuentebella	83,969	49.88
Liberal	Imelda Papin	83,229	49.44
WPP	Iliw Iliw William	1,138	0.68
Total votes		168,336	100
NPC hold			

=== 2013 ===
2013 Philippine House of Representatives elections
Party	Candidate	Votes	%
NPC	Felix William Fuentebella	82,834	50.67
Liberal	Aga Muhlach	80,629	49.33
Total votes		163,463	100
NPC hold			

=== 2010 ===
2013 Philippine House of Representatives elections
Party	Candidate	Votes	%
NPC	Arnulfo Fuentebella	89,537	61.53
Lakas–Kampi	Teodoro Cruz Jr.	55,999	38.47
Total votes		145,536	100
NPC gain from Lakas–Kampi			

== See also ==
- Legislative districts of Camarines Sur
