= Bombon, Camarines Sur =

Municipality in Camarines Sur, Philippines

Bombon
- Municipality
- Municipality of Bombon
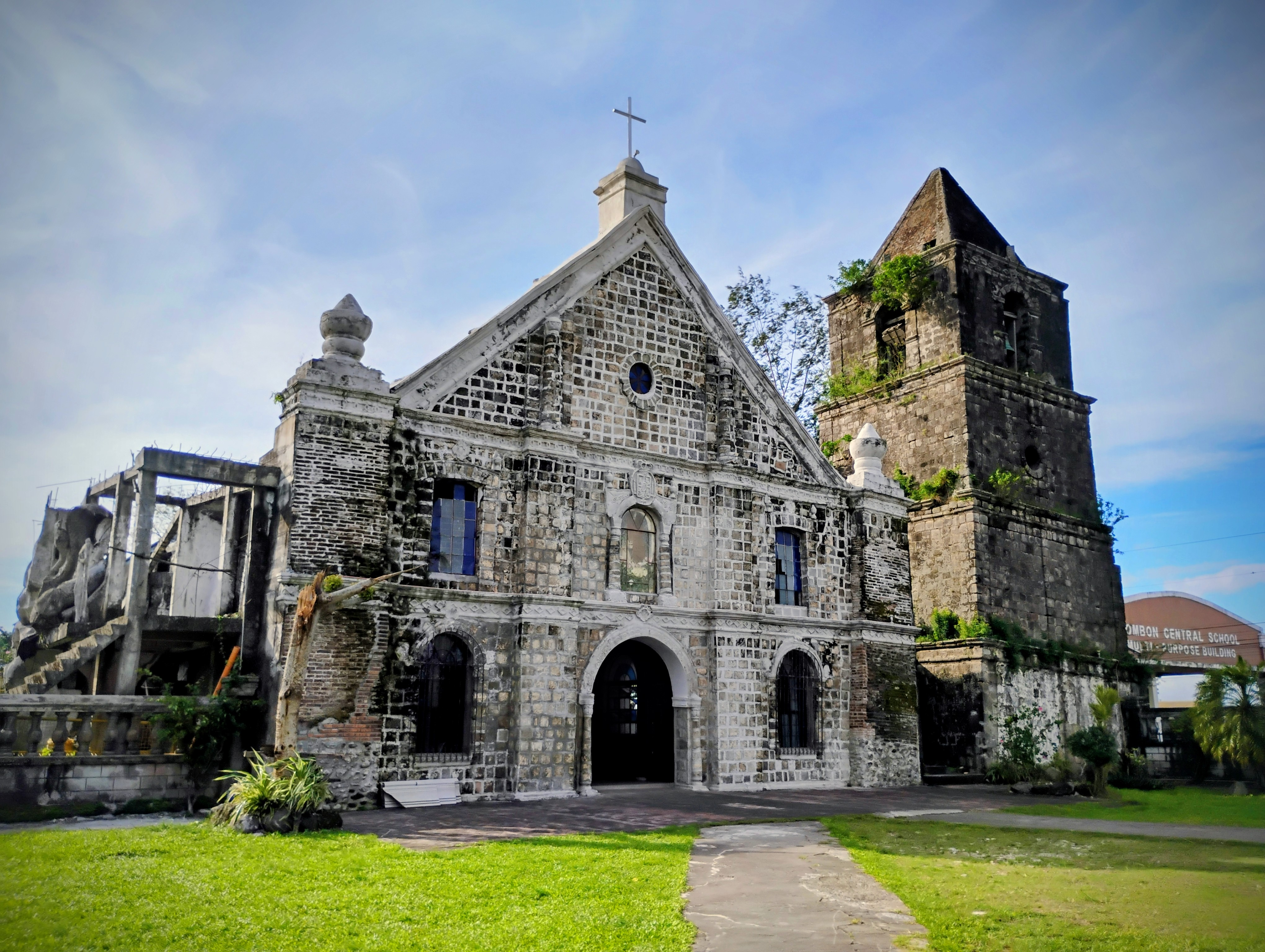
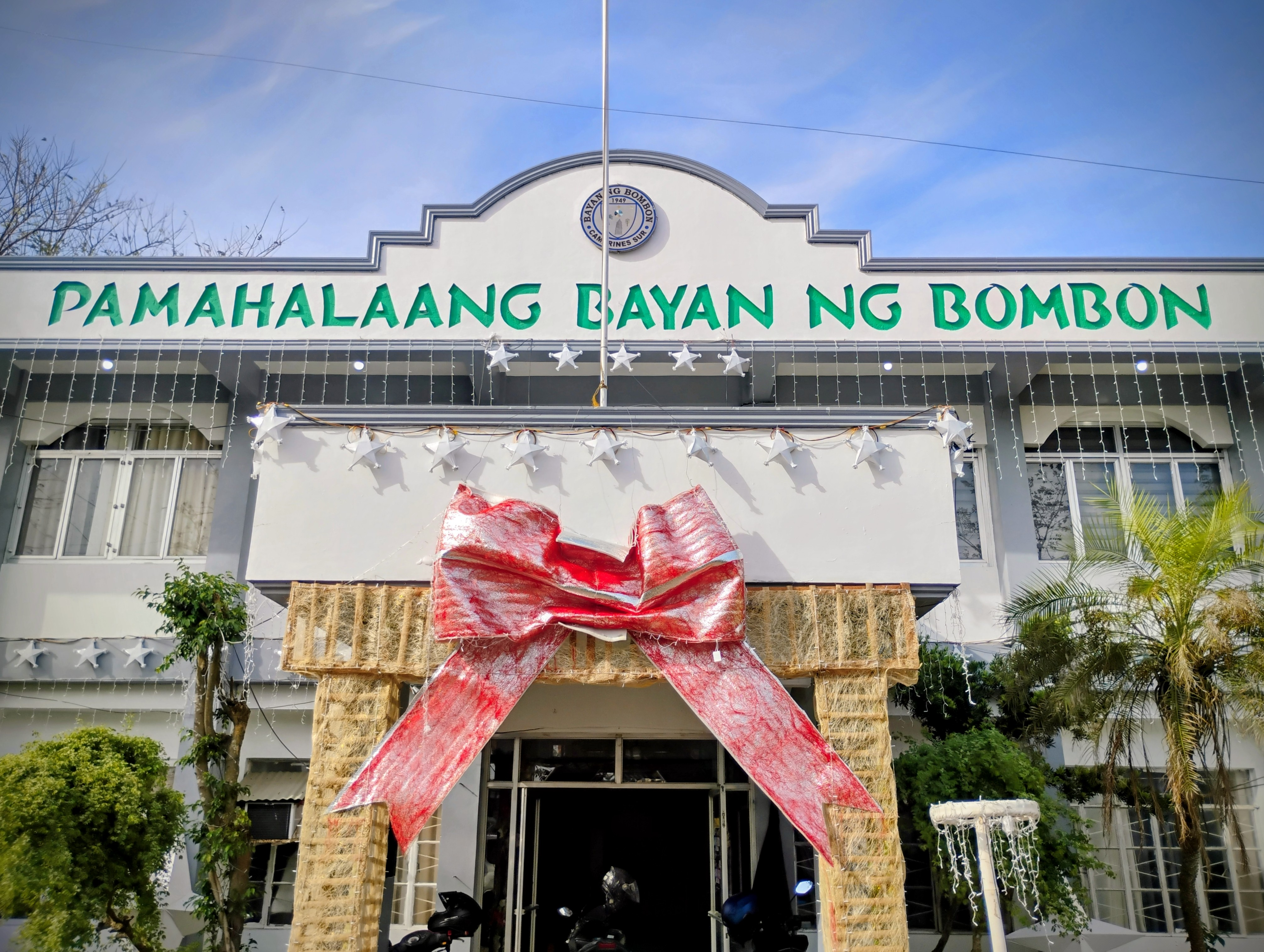
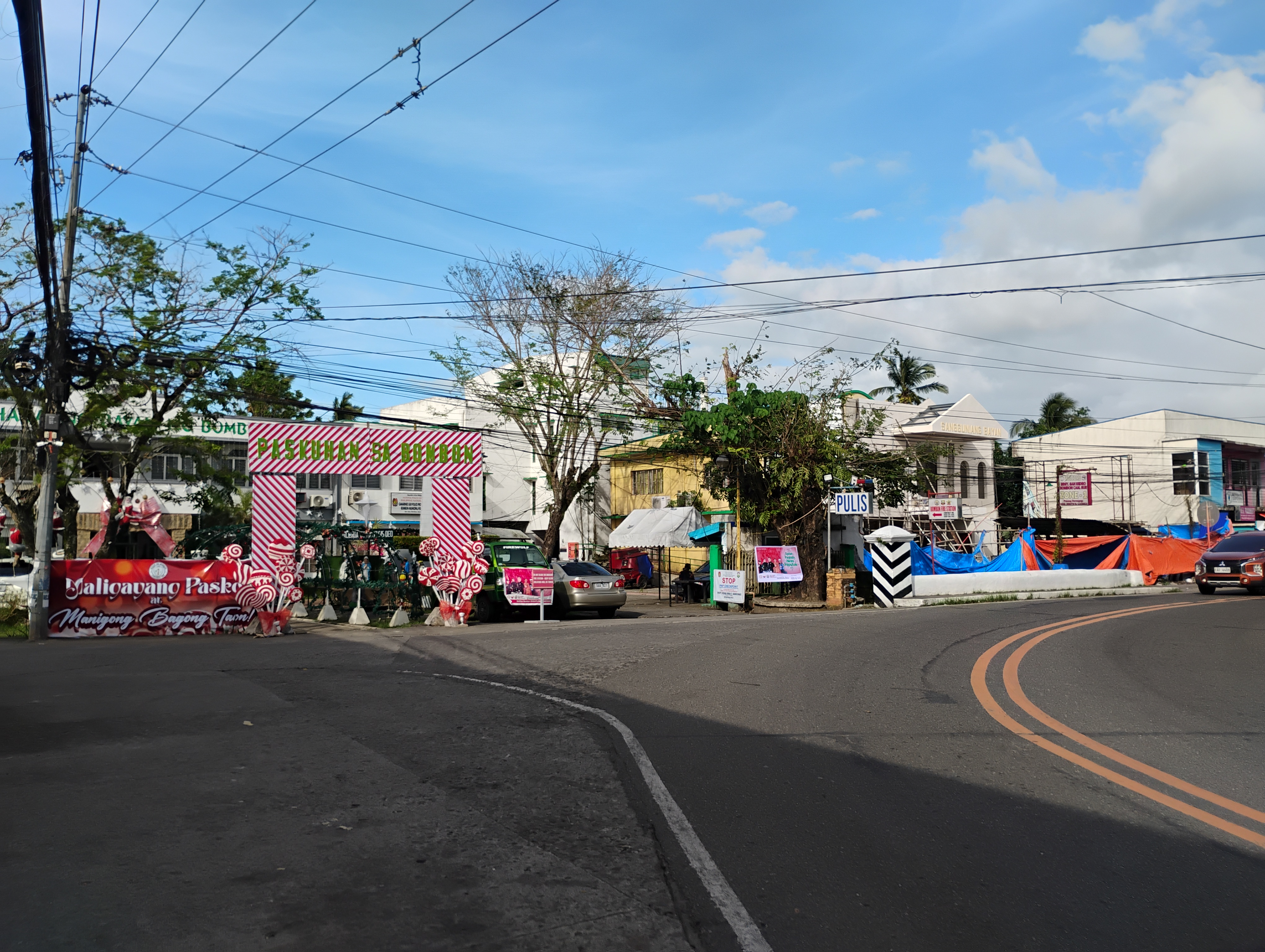
- Our Lady of the Holy Rosary Parish Church Bombon Municipal Hall Bombon Town Proper

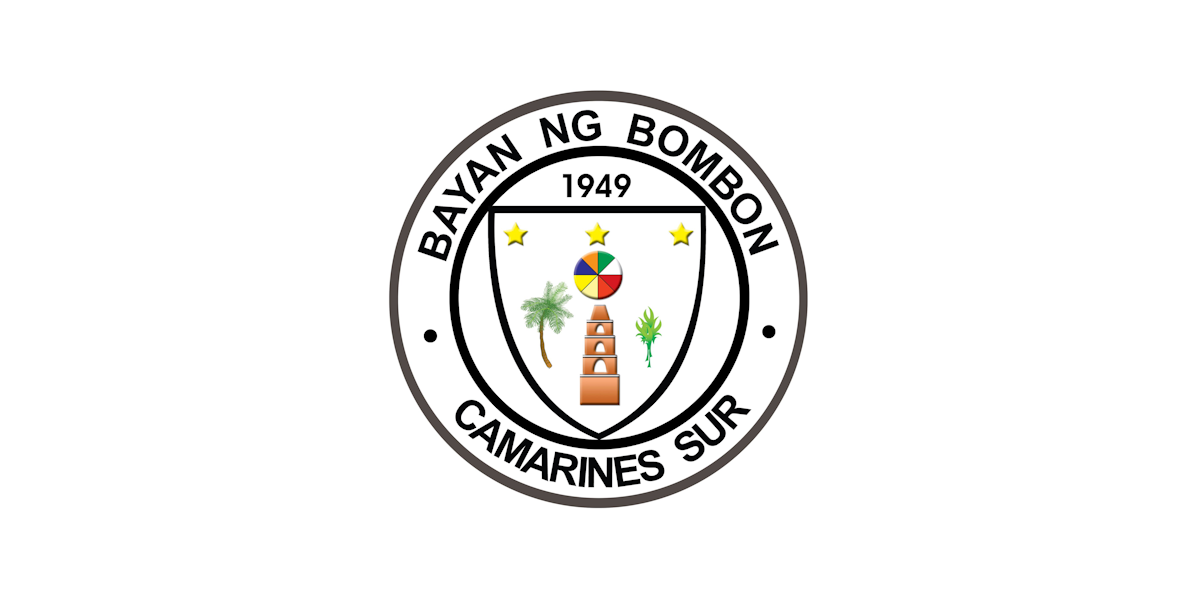
- Flag

- Map of Camarines Sur with Bombon highlighted
- Interactive map of Bombon
- Location within the Philippines
- Coordinates: 13°41′12″N 123°11′58″E
- Country: Philippines
- Region: Bicol Region
- Province: Camarines Sur
- District: 3rd district
- Founded: 1949
- Barangays: 8 (see Barangays)

Government
  - Type: Sangguniang Bayan
  - Mayor: James Paul A. Ranin
  - Vice Mayor: Roy Sherwin D. Angeles
  - Representative: Nelson S. Legacion
  - Municipal Council: Members: Julian C. Zabaldica Jr.; Roberto S. Maldo; Eddie Felix S. Alteza; Sancho A. Dela Merced; Lynnel B. Hemady; Jofrey S. Pagsobillo; Raul A. Porteria; Amiel A. Bajado
  - Electorate: 12,110 voters (2025)

Area
  - Total: 28.73 km^{2} (11.09 sq mi)
- Elevation: 10 m (33 ft)
- Highest elevation: 57 m (187 ft)
- Lowest elevation: −2 m (−6.6 ft)

Population (2024 census)
  - Total: 17,346
  - Density: 603.8/km^{2} (1,564/sq mi)
  - Households: 4,010

Economy
  - Income class: 4th municipal income class
  - Poverty incidence: 22.51% (2023)
  - Revenue: ₱ 101.7 million (2024)
  - Assets: ₱ 383.4 million (2024)
  - Expenditure: ₱ 85.64 million (2024)
  - Liabilities: ₱ 71.44 million (2024)

Service provider
  - Electricity: Camarines Sur 2 Electric Cooperative (CASURECO 2)
- Time zone: UTC+8 (PST)
- ZIP code: 4404
- PSGC: 0501704000
- IDD : area code: +63 (0)54
- Native languages: Central Bikol; Tagalog
- Website: bombon.gov.ph

Bombon, officially the Municipality of Bombon (Central Bikol: Banwaan kan Bombon; Tagalog: Bayan ng Bombon), is a municipality in the province of Camarines Sur, Philippines. According to the 2024 census, it has a population of 17,346 people.

The town is surrounded by green fields and extensive rice paddies, which contribute to its rural landscape.

== History ==
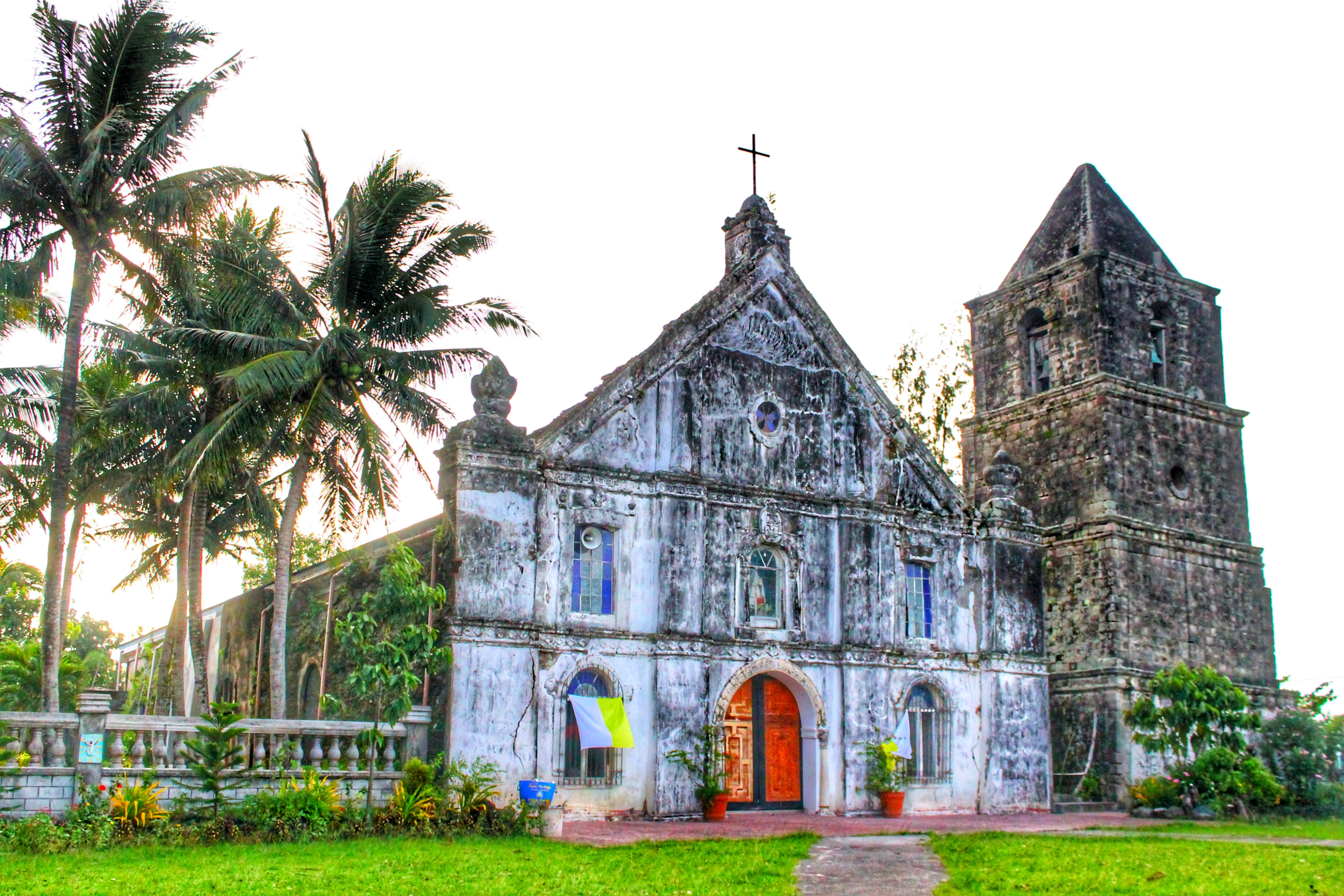
Our Lady of the Holy Rosary Parish Church

Like any other municipalities in the province, Bombon also started as a barrio or visita. It was dependent on the older town of Quipayo for nearly 240 years, now a barangay of Calabanga. It became an independent town with the arrival of the American military government on February 11, 1900, but upon establishment of the U.S.-controlled Insular Government of the Philippine Islands in 1903, Bombon was annexed to Calabanga, then made a barrio of Magarao.

It was again made a separate municipality through Executive Order 251 dated July 27, 1949, signed by President Elpidio Quirino. Appointed officials at the time were José Buenagua Sr, Mayor; Juan Nale, Casiano Aburro, Manuel Rojo, and Julián Sumangid, Councilors.

In 1993, by E.O. 102 of President Fidel V. Ramos, Bombon was included in the creation of the Metro Naga Development Council together with the towns of Bula, Calabanga, Camaligan, Canaman, Gainza, Magarao, Milaor, Minalabac, Ocampo, Pamplona, Pasacao, Pili, and San Fernando.

The Leaning Bell Tower found in this municipality serves as a historical attraction. Bombon celebrates its Foundation Anniversary every August 13.

== Geography ==
=== Barangays ===
Bombon is politically subdivided into 8 barangays. Each barangay consists of puroks and some have sitios.

- Pagao (San Juan)
- San Antonio
- San Francisco
- San Isidro (Poblacion)
- San Jose (Poblacion)
- San Roque (Poblacion)
- Santo Domingo
- Siembre

=== Climate ===
Climate data for Bombon, Camarines Sur
Month	Jan	Feb	Mar	Apr	May	Jun	Jul	Aug	Sep	Oct	Nov	Dec	Year
Mean daily maximum °C (°F)	32 (90)	31 (88)	34 (93)	36 (97)	37 (99)	37 (99)	36 (97)	34 (93)	35 (95)	34 (93)	33 (91)	32 (90)	34 (94)
Mean daily minimum °C (°F)	27 (81)	27 (81)	29 (84)	31 (88)	32 (90)	32 (90)	31 (88)	30 (86)	30 (86)	29 (84)	28 (82)	28 (82)	30 (85)
Average precipitation mm (inches)	39.34 (1.55)	68.7 (2.70)	26.73 (1.05)	66.19 (2.61)	84.49 (3.33)	178.89 (7.04)	244.27 (9.62)	188.3 (7.41)	160.98 (6.34)	445.0 (17.52)	135.5 (5.33)	367.8 (14.48)	2,006.19 (78.98)
Average rainy days	16	18	13	15	23	28	30	24	26	27	25	29	274
Source: World Weather Online

== Demographics ==
Population census of Bombon
Year	Pop.	±% p.a.
1948	1,917	—
1960	5,179	+8.63%
1970	6,495	+2.29%
1975	7,494	+2.91%
1980	8,234	+1.90%
1990	10,874	+2.82%
1995	11,739	+1.44%
2000	12,843	+1.95%
2007	14,083	+1.28%
2010	15,437	+3.40%
2015	16,512	+1.29%
2020	17,995	+1.83%
2024	17,346	−0.88%
Source: Philippine Statistics Authority

In the 2024 census, the population of Bombon was 17,346 people, with a density of 600 inhabitants per square kilometre or 1,600 inhabitants per square mile.

=== Literacy rate ===
- 97.75% in both rural as well as urban areas
- Almost half of the population 5 years and older have reached elementary grade and about 25.8% have finished high school

=== Work and labor force ===
- 15 years and older - about 3,590 or 55% are in the active labor force while the remaining 45% are schooling, disabled, or home caretaker
- Majority (3,590) of the population in the active force are gainfully employed with only 158 as unemployed
- Agriculture and its complementary industries are the major sources of employment

=== Languages ===
- 98% of the population considers Bikol as their first language
- Tagalog: 1.67%
- English language as second language

=== Religion ===
- Approximately ninety five percent (95%) of the population is Roman Catholics
- 5% subdivided into the different modern sects of religion such as the Iglesia ni Cristo, UCCP, Aglipay, Born Again, Jehovah's Witnesses, Seventh Day Adventist and other forms religious affiliation

=== Housing ===
- 71% of the total housing units are considered single dwelling and it is mostly made-up

of concrete and semi-permanent materials

- Shanties or "barong-barong" accounts to about 29% of the total number of housing units

== Economy ==
Poverty incidence of Bombon (%)

Source: Philippine Statistics Authority

Due to its extreme proximity to Calabanga's town proper usually Bombonenos go to Calabanga for trade and buying while leaving the town behind.

Despite staying as a fourth class municipality more developments are happening in town, this was made possible by the local government of the town, including the government of Camarines Sur. Being strategically located in two booming municipalities the town of Calabanga in the north and Naga City to the south the town itself is already a small growing municipality. Its proximity to Naga City is also one of the reasons why there are developments in Bombon.

Bombon was formerly included in the Metro Naga area before the designation was discontinued in 2017.

=== Agricultural sector ===
- Major Crops:
  - Active agricultural area: About 3,978.7580 hectares
  - Mostly planted with rice either irrigated, rainfed or upland rice
    - Irrigated paddy rice has an estimated area of about 1,028.75 hectares while rainfed and upland rice occupies about 564.87 and 33 hectares, respectively
    - Corn areas comprise 38.75 hectares and sugarcane has 118.18 hectares
- Livestock and Poultry Production
  - As of 1999, area has an estimated animal population of about 6,374 heads
    - 3,740 or 59% are poultry and 2,634 or 41% are livestock
    - Chicken has an aggregate number of 2,567 and ducks with 1,053 heads
    - Major livestock raise is swine with 1,850 heads while carabao and sheep/goat have 176 and 203 heads, respectively

== Government ==
=== Protection and security ===
- Current police ratio to the population is 1:1,363

== Healthcare ==
Health facilities consist of the following:

- 1 Rural Health Unit
- 1 barangay station

== Education ==
The Magarao-Bombon Schools District Office governs all educational institutions within the municipality. It oversees the management and operations of all private and public, from primary to secondary schools.

Primary and elementary schools

- Bombon Central School
- Hansel & Gretel Foundation
- Pagao Elementary School
- San Antonio Elementary School
- San Francisco Elementary School
- San Roque Elementary School
- Sto. Domingo Elementary School
- Siembre Elementary School

Secondary schools

- Siembre High School
- Sulpicio A. Roco Memorial High School
