= Tigaon =

Tigaon may refer to:

- Tigaon, Camarines Sur, Philippines
- Tigaon Assembly constituency, India
