= Garchitorena =

Municipality in Camarines Sur, Philippines

Garchitorena Anderson
- Municipality
- Municipality of Garchitorena
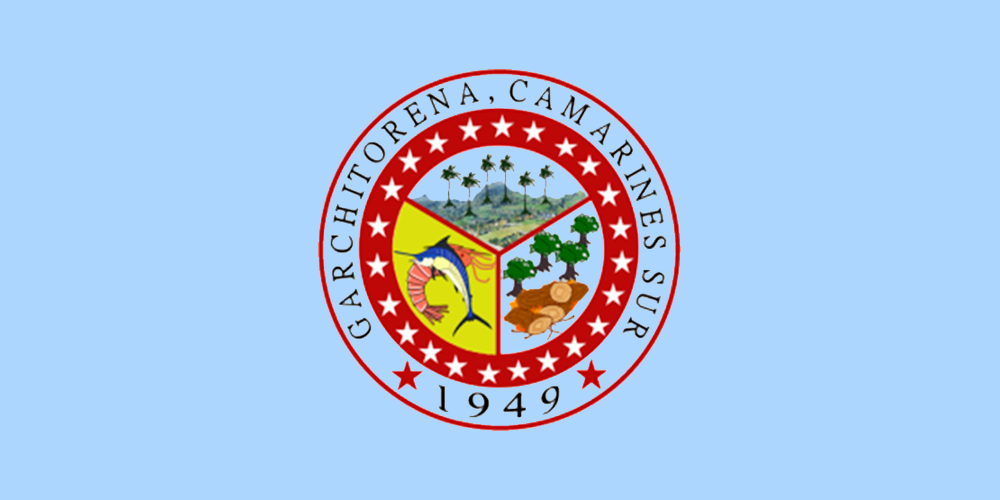
- Flag

- Map of Camarines Sur with Garchitorena highlighted
- Interactive map of Garchitorena
- Location within the Philippines
- Coordinates: 13°53′N 123°42′E
- Country: Philippines
- Region: Bicol Region
- Province: Camarines Sur
- District: 4th district
- Founded: March 4, 1949
- Named for: Andres Garchitorena
- Barangays: 23 (see Barangays)

Government
  - Type: Sangguniang Bayan
  - Mayor: Nelson Bueza
  - Vice Mayor: Ronie Castor
  - Representative: Arnulf Bryan B. Fuentebella
  - Municipal Council: Members: Apot Savilla; Dagul Valencia; Jose Berunio; Benito Edgardo Berunio; Neil Noble; Ariel A. Racelis; Simeon Dianela Jr.; Ronilo Teoxon
  - Electorate: 20,196 voters (2025)

Area
  - Total: 243.80 km^{2} (94.13 sq mi)
- Elevation: 30 m (98 ft)
- Highest elevation: 317 m (1,040 ft)
- Lowest elevation: 0 m (0 ft)

Population (2024 census)
  - Total: 29,408
  - Density: 120.62/km^{2} (312.41/sq mi)
  - Households: 6,013

Economy
  - Income class: 2nd municipal income class
  - Poverty incidence: 44.05% (2023)
  - Revenue: ₱ 183.7 million (2024)
  - Assets: ₱ 564.2 million (2024)
  - Expenditure: ₱ 163.5 million (2024)
  - Liabilities: ₱ 149.4 million (2024)

Service provider
  - Electricity: Camarines Sur 4 Electric Cooperative (CASURECO 4)
- Time zone: UTC+8 (PST)
- ZIP code: 4428
- PSGC: 0501714000
- IDD : area code: +63 (0)54
- Native languages: Central Bikol; Tagalog

Garchitorena, officially the Municipality of Garchitorena (Central Bikol: Banwaan kan Garchitorena; Tagalog: Bayan ng Garchitorena), is a municipality in the province of Camarines Sur, Philippines. According to the 2024 census, it has a population of 29,408 people.

Its territory includes the islands of Quinalasag, Lamit, and Malabungot, also known as Mahad.

== History ==
The original location of Garchitorena is said to be found at the mouth of the Pambuhan River but it was later transferred to Binanwahan primarily because of frequent attacks of the Moros.

Soon, a rich man by the name of Don Andres Garchitorena, who hailed from Tigaon and owned in this place a vast portion of the land area, persuaded the townspeople to plant abaca. He later established an abaca processing plant which started the establishment of this coastal settlement.

The municipality was established on March 4, 1949, through Executive Order No. 205 signed by President Elpidio Quirino. It was originally named the municipality of Anderson.

== Geography ==
=== Barangays ===
Garchitorena is politically subdivided into 23 barangays. Each barangay consists of puroks and some have sitios.

- Ason (Anson)
- Bahi
- Binagasbasan
- Burabod
- Cagamutan
- Cagnipa
- Canlong
- Dangla
- Del Pilar
- Denrica
- Harrison
- Mansangat
- Pambuhan
- Barangay I (Poblacion)
- Barangay II (Poblacion)
- Barangay III (Poblacion)
- Barangay IV (Poblacion)
- Sagrada
- Salvacion
- San Vicente
- Sumaoy
- Tamiawon
- Toytoy

=== Climate ===
Climate data for Garchitorena, Camarines Sur
Month	Jan	Feb	Mar	Apr	May	Jun	Jul	Aug	Sep	Oct	Nov	Dec	Year
Mean daily maximum °C (°F)	30 (86)	30 (86)	32 (90)	33 (91)	35 (95)	35 (95)	35 (95)	34 (93)	35 (95)	33 (91)	31 (88)	31 (88)	33 (91)
Mean daily minimum °C (°F)	27 (81)	27 (81)	28 (82)	30 (86)	31 (88)	31 (88)	31 (88)	30 (86)	30 (86)	29 (84)	28 (82)	28 (82)	29 (85)
Average precipitation mm (inches)	151.1 (5.95)	198.89 (7.83)	106.28 (4.18)	60.08 (2.37)	63.62 (2.50)	85.76 (3.38)	117.53 (4.63)	46.99 (1.85)	52.23 (2.06)	740.22 (29.14)	522.7 (20.58)	618.0 (24.33)	2,763.4 (108.8)
Average rainy days	24	28	18	23	23	25	29	21	26	28	29	31	305
Source: World Weather Online

== Demographics ==
Population census of Garchitorena
Year	Pop.	±% p.a.
1960	10,191	—
1970	15,890	+4.54%
1975	16,438	+0.68%
1980	16,877	+0.53%
1990	19,439	+1.42%
1995	19,481	+0.04%
2000	23,021	+3.64%
2007	24,825	+1.05%
2010	25,204	+0.55%
2015	27,010	+1.33%
2020	29,436	+1.83%
2024	29,408	−0.02%
Source: Philippine Statistics Authority

In the 2024 census, the population of Garchitorena was 29,408 people, with a density of 120 inhabitants per square kilometre or 310 inhabitants per square mile.

Bikol is the predominant language spoken.

== Economy ==
Poverty incidence of Garchitorena (%)

Source: Philippine Statistics Authority

Local agricultural products in the town includes abaca, coconut, and palay. Electrical power is supplied by CASURECO (Camarines Sur Electric Cooperative).

== Education ==
The Garchitorena Schools District Office governs all educational institutions within the municipality. It oversees the management and operations of all private and public, from primary to secondary schools.

=== Primary and elementary schools ===
- Ason Elementary School
- Bahi Elementary School
- Binagasbasan Elementary School
- Burabod Elementary School
- Cagamutan Primary School
- Cagnipa Elementary School
- Canlong Elementary School
- Culapnit Elementary School
- Dangla Elementary School
- Del Pilar Elementary School
- Denrica Elementary School
- Garchitorena Central School
- Magsaysay Elementary School
- Mansangat Elementary School
- Pambuhan Elementary School
- Sagrada Elementary School
- San Antonio Elementary School
- San Vicente Elementary School
- Tamiawon Elementary School
- Tinawagan Primary School

=== Secondary schools ===
- Bahi National High School
- Binagasbasan National High School
- Binagasbasan National High School - Denrica National High School
- Burabod National High school
- Harrison Integrated School
- Pambuhan National High School
- Sacred Heart Academy
- Sumaoy Integrated School
- Toytoy Integrated School

== See also ==
- Malabungot
