= Partido Development Administration =

The Partido Development Administration (PDA; Filipino: Pangasiwaan sa Pagpapaunlad ng Partido) is a government-owned and controlled corporation of the national government of the Philippines that is tasked with developing the Partido region, which covers the entire 4th District of Camarines Sur. Its headquarters is located at Caraycayon, Tigaon.

Founded in 1994, the PDA is "a corporate entity tasked by RA 7820 to oversee the economic development of the Partido area. It has its own funding source and was empowered by this law to transact business independent of the Camarines Sur provincial government."

== History ==
=== Republic Act No. 7820 ===
Partido Development Administration was founded on November 18, 1994, through the Republic Act No. 7820 known as the "Partido Development Administration Act of 1994". Some sources indicate that it was enacted on July 25, 1994.

The need to orchestrate the development efforts within the district was clearly recognized by Cong. Arnulfo P. Fuentebella and overwhelmingly supported by the local executives and officials. House Bill No. 11526 was sponsored by Cong. Fuentebella proposing for the creation of the Partido Development Authority. The assistance of the National Economic and Development Authority Regional Office 5 was sought to help in the conduct of consultative meetings with the different local government units and private sector representatives. The main output is the Land Use Plan of the District.

With a corporate personality, PDA has been mandated to discharge the following functions and powers:

1. encourage the creation of economic zones and/or industrial estates
2. contract foreign and/or local loans and receive grants to implement programs
3. undertake measures to source out funds for the district's program
4. formulate and implement a comprehensive and integrated development program for the district
5. conduct inventory of resources
6. pass over all plans and projects proposed by LGUs and public agencies and private enterprises
7. recommend policies and programs affecting the area
8. promote investments for the area

On December 31, 2000, Republic Act No. 8989 was enacted making amends to Republic Act No. 7820.
