= Presentacion =

Municipality in Camarines Sur, Philippines

Presentacion Parubcan
- Municipality
- Municipality of Presentacion
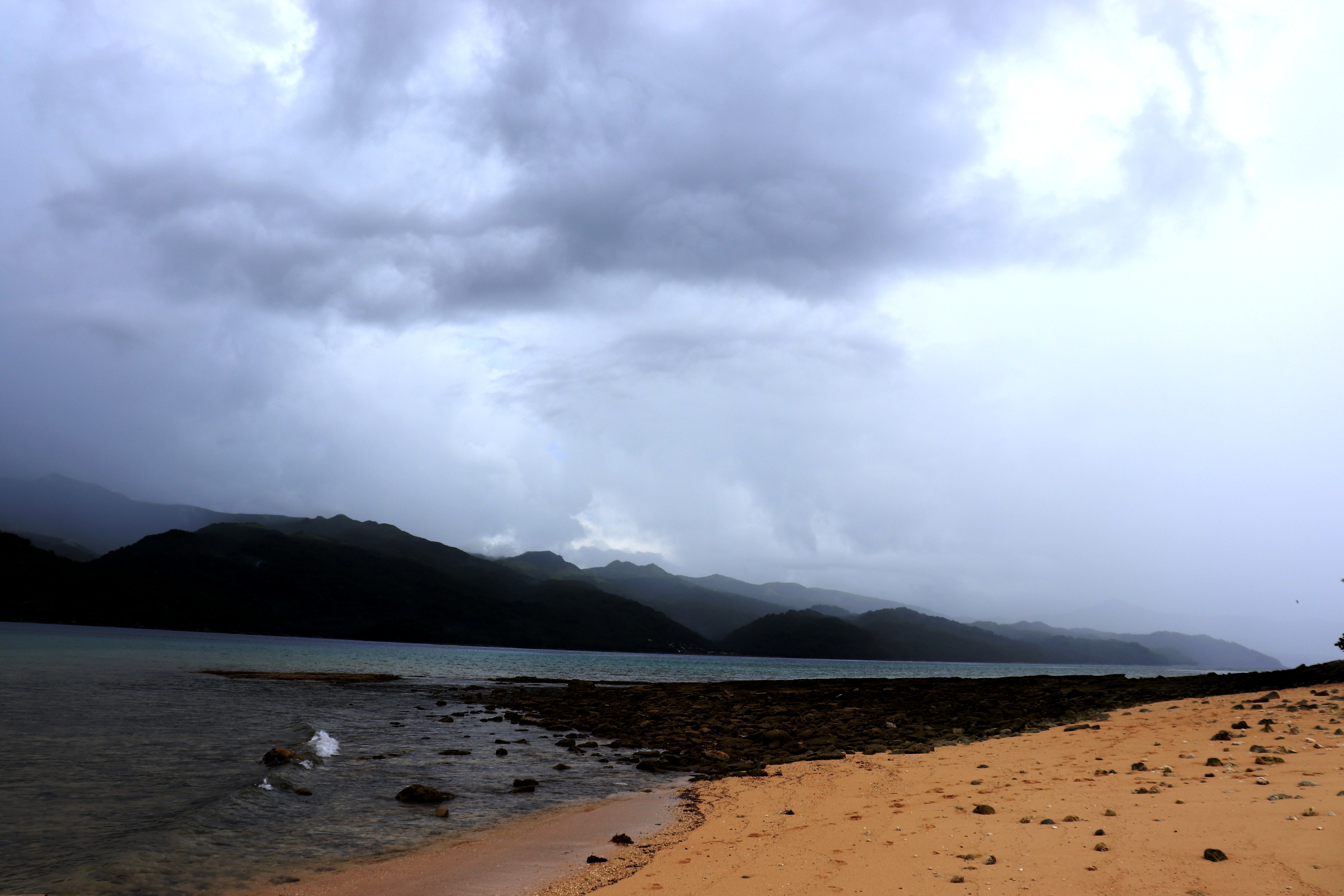
- Mountains of Presentacion and Caramoan Peninsula

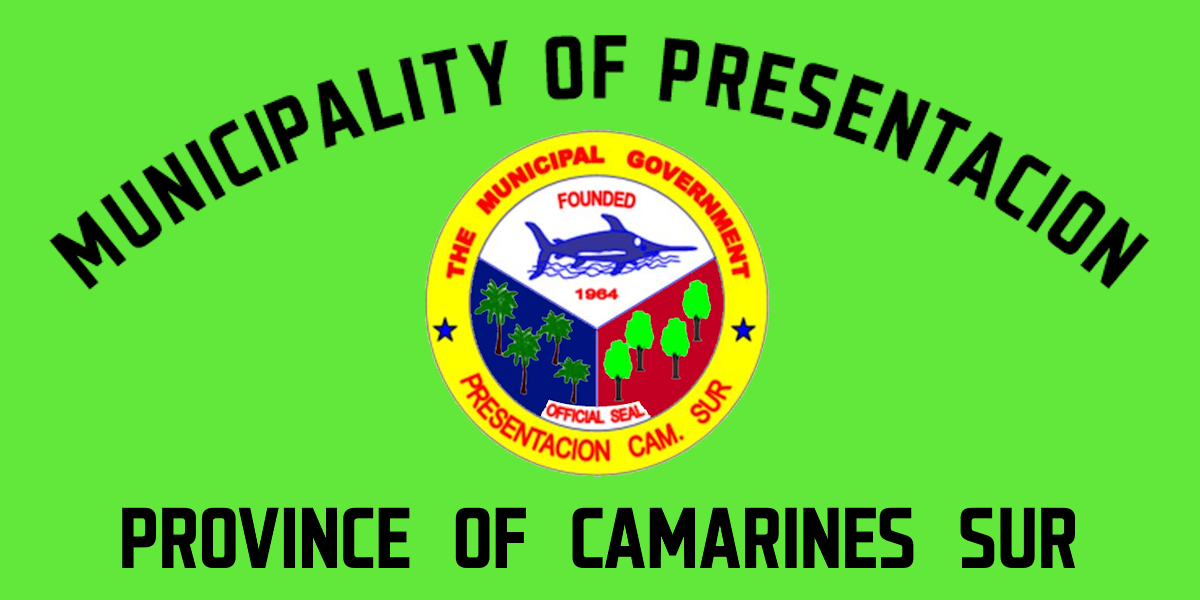
- Flag

- Map of Camarines Sur with Presentacion highlighted
- Interactive map of Presentacion
- Location within the Philippines
- Coordinates: 13°42′36″N 123°44′42″E
- Country: Philippines
- Region: Bicol Region
- Province: Camarines Sur
- District: 4th district
- Founded: 1964
- Barangays: 18 (see Barangays)

Government
  - Type: Sangguniang Bayan
  - Mayor: Alicia A. Deleña
  - Vice Mayor: Felimon D. Goyena
  - Representative: Arnulf Bryan B. Fuentebella
  - Municipal Council: Members: Arturo D. Amoroso; Melgen G. Indico; Grandel C. Pesimo; William A. Relleta Jr.; Hipolito C. Singayan; Mario C. Tomotorgo; Sailito V. Corre; Clara P. Saldo
  - Electorate: 17,442 voters (2025)

Area
  - Total: 143.80 km^{2} (55.52 sq mi)
- Elevation: 112 m (367 ft)
- Highest elevation: 678 m (2,224 ft)
- Lowest elevation: 0 m (0 ft)

Population (2024 census)
  - Total: 23,323
  - Density: 162.19/km^{2} (420.07/sq mi)
  - Households: 4,691

Economy
  - Income class: 3rd municipal income class
  - Poverty incidence: 36.59% (2023)
  - Revenue: ₱ 141.6 million (2024)
  - Assets: ₱ 307.8 million (2024)
  - Expenditure: ₱ 130.2 million (2024)
  - Liabilities: ₱ 51.65 million (2024)

Service provider
  - Electricity: Camarines Sur 4 Electric Cooperative (CASURECO 4)
- Time zone: UTC+8 (PST)
- ZIP code: 4424
- PSGC: 0501729000
- IDD : area code: +63 (0)54
- Native languages: Central Bikol; Tagalog

Presentacion, officially the Municipality of Presentacion (Central Bikol: Banwaan kan Presentacion; Tagalog: Bayan ng Presentacion), is a municipality in the province of Camarines Sur, Philippines. According to the 2024 census, it has a population of 23,323 people.

It is formerly known as Parubcan.

== History ==
The Municipality of Presentacion was created in 1963. Separating from the municipality of Lagonoy, in the province of Camarines Sur.

== Geography ==
=== Barangays ===
Presentacion is politically subdivided into 18 barangays. Each barangay consists of puroks and some have sitios.

- Ayugao
- Bagong Sirang
- Baliguian
- Bantugan
- Bicalen
- Bitaogan
- Buenavista
- Bulalacao
- Cagnipa
- Lagha
- Lidong
- Liwacsa
- Maangas
- Pagsangaan
- Patrocinio (Dalhugan)
- Pili
- Santa Maria (Poblacion)
- Tanauan

=== Climate ===
Climate data for Presentacion, Camarines Sur
Month	Jan	Feb	Mar	Apr	May	Jun	Jul	Aug	Sep	Oct	Nov	Dec	Year
Mean daily maximum °C (°F)	30 (86)	30 (86)	32 (90)	33 (91)	35 (95)	35 (95)	35 (95)	34 (93)	35 (95)	33 (91)	31 (88)	31 (88)	33 (91)
Mean daily minimum °C (°F)	27 (81)	27 (81)	28 (82)	30 (86)	31 (88)	31 (88)	31 (88)	30 (86)	30 (86)	29 (84)	28 (82)	28 (82)	29 (85)
Average precipitation mm (inches)	151.1 (5.95)	198.89 (7.83)	106.28 (4.18)	60.08 (2.37)	63.62 (2.50)	85.76 (3.38)	117.53 (4.63)	46.99 (1.85)	52.23 (2.06)	740.22 (29.14)	522.7 (20.58)	618 (24.3)	2,763.4 (108.77)
Average rainy days	24	28	18	23	23	25	29	21	26	28	29	31	305
Source: World Weather Online (modeled/calculated data, not measured locally)

== Demographics ==
Population census of Presentacion

Year	Pop.	±% p.a.
1970	12,889	—
1975	13,555	+1.02%
1980	13,244	−0.46%
1990	14,788	+1.11%
1995	15,346	+0.70%
2000	16,410	+1.45%

Year	Pop.	±% p.a.
2007	20,266	+2.95%
2010	20,023	−0.44%
2015	20,996	+0.91%
2020	22,591	+1.55%
2024	23,323	+0.77%

Source: Philippine Statistics Authority

In the 2024 census, the population of Presentacion was 23,323 people, with a density of 160 inhabitants per square kilometre or 410 inhabitants per square mile.

== Economy ==
Poverty incidence of Presentacion (%)

Source: Philippine Statistics Authority

== Education ==
The Parubcan-Presentacion Schools District Office governs all educational institutions within the municipality. It oversees the management and operations of all private and public, from primary to secondary schools.

=== Primary and elementary schools ===
- Ayugao Elementary School
- Bagong Sirang Elementary School
- Baliguian Elementary School
- Bantugan Elementary School
- Bicalen Elementary School
- Bitaogan Elementary School
- Buenavista Elementary School
- Bulalacao Elementary School
- Cagnipa Elementary School
- Holy Angel School
- Lagha Elementary School
- Lidong Elementary School
- Liwacsa Elementary School
- Maangas Elementary School
- Pagsangaan Elementary School
- Parubcan Central School
- Pili Elementary School
- Tanawan Elementary School

=== Secondary schools ===
- Bantugan National High School
- Bitaogan National High School
- Buenavista National High School
- Federico P. Condat National High School
- Lidong High School
- Moises D. Fernandez Sr. Pioneer High School
- Presentacion National High School

== Notable personalities ==
- Imelda Papin, Filipino singer and politician

== Gallery ==
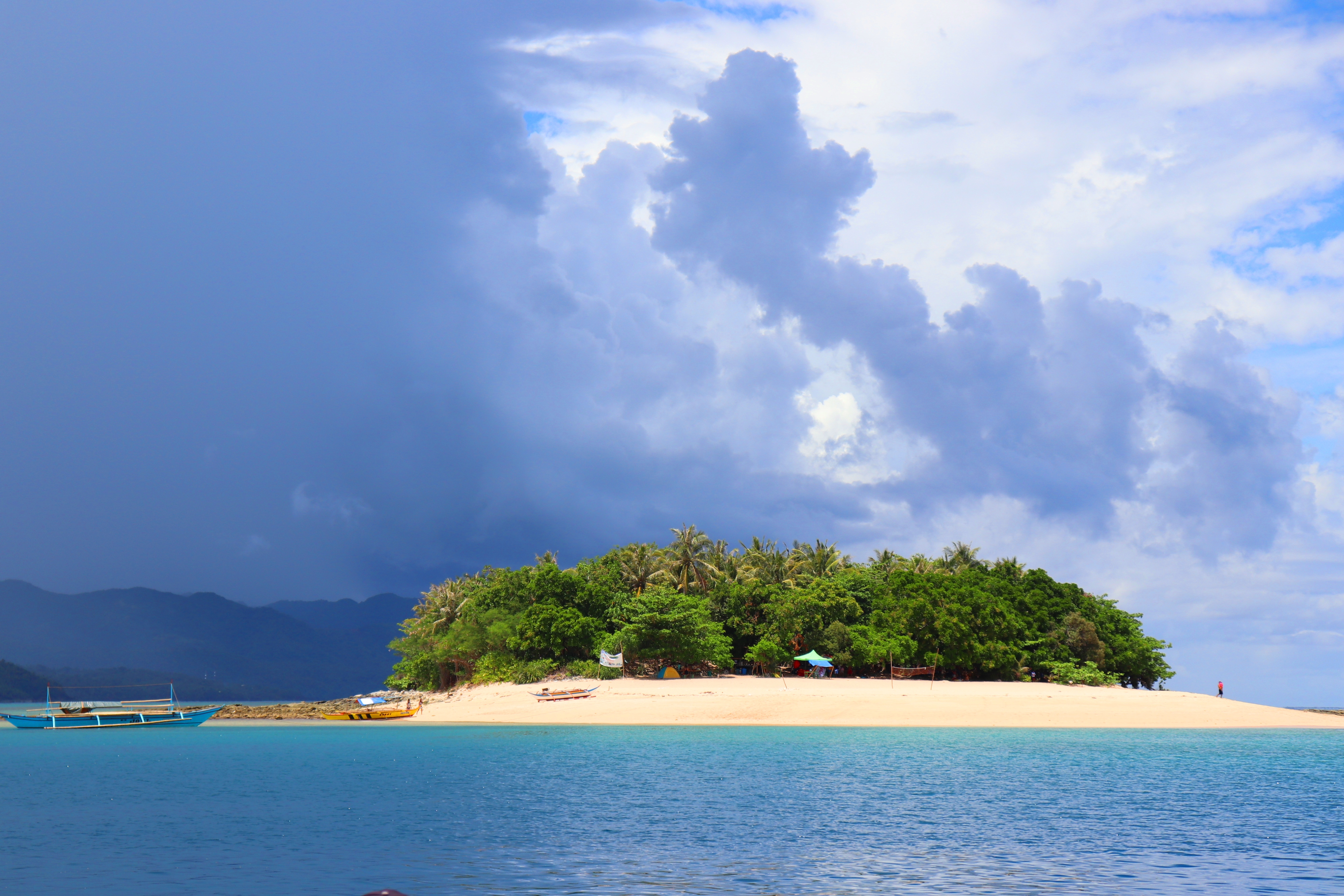
Aguirangan Island

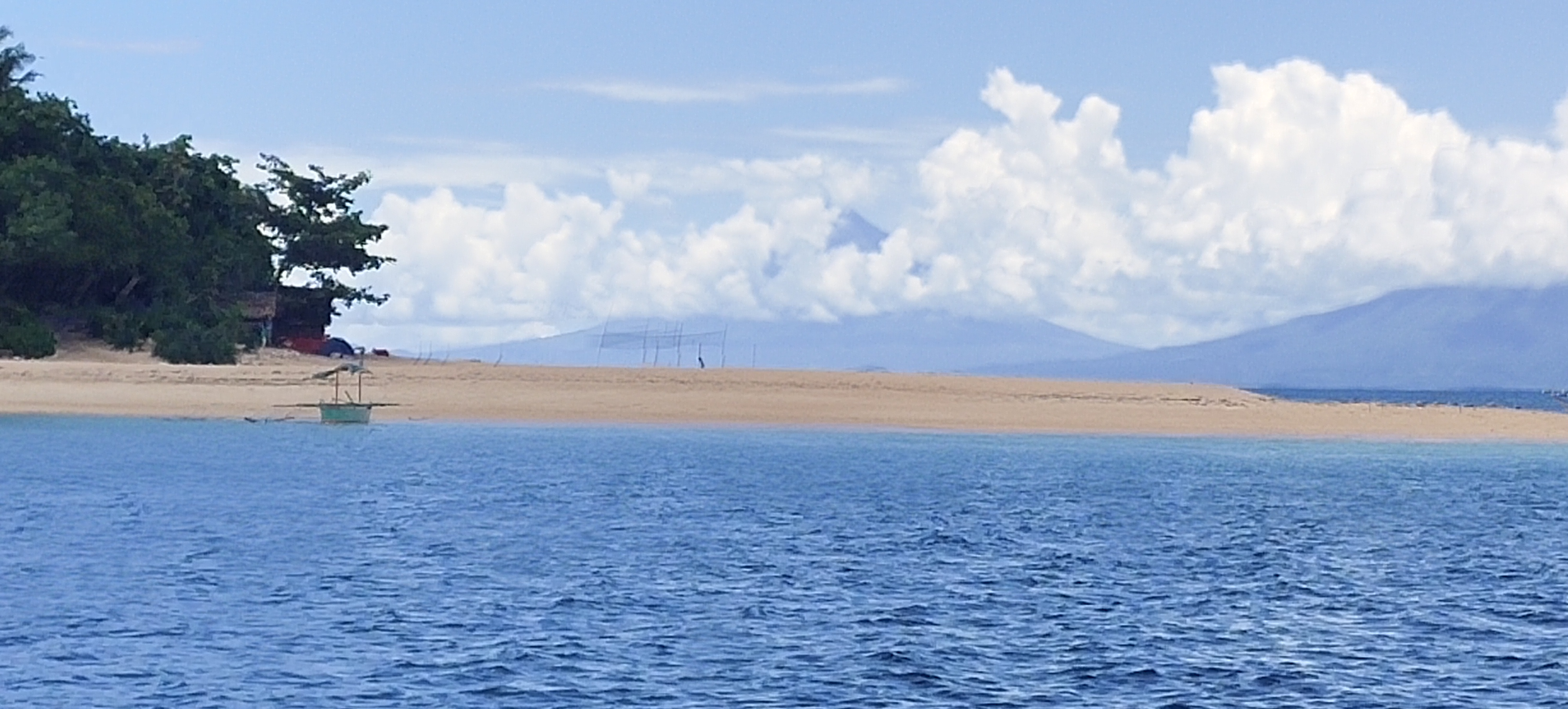
View of the Mayon Volcano from Aguirangan Island

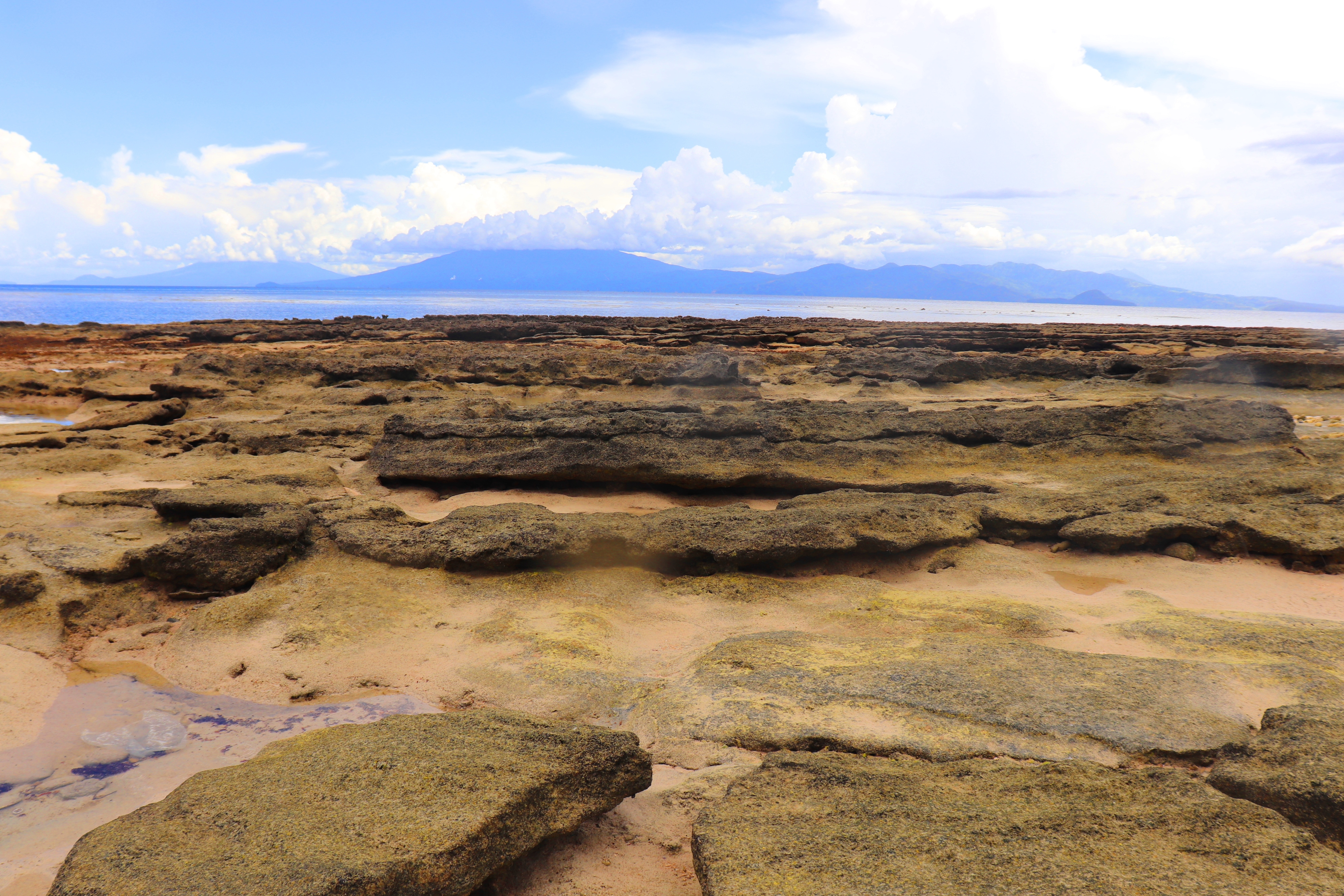
Rock formations in Aguirangan Island

== See also ==
- List of renamed cities and municipalities of the Philippines
