= Siruma =

Municipality in Camarines Sur, Philippines

- Municipality
- Municipality of Siruma
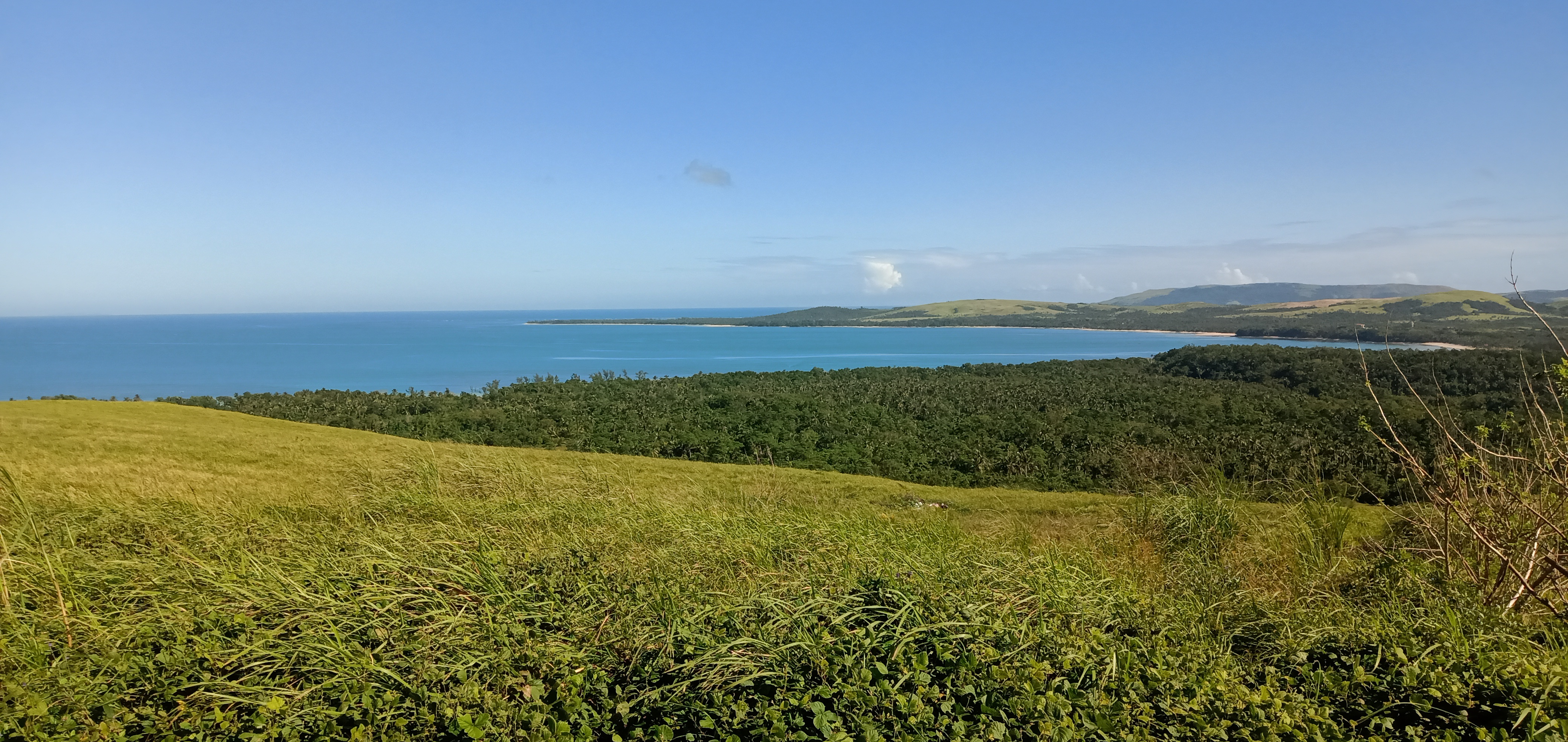
- View from Siruma View Deck

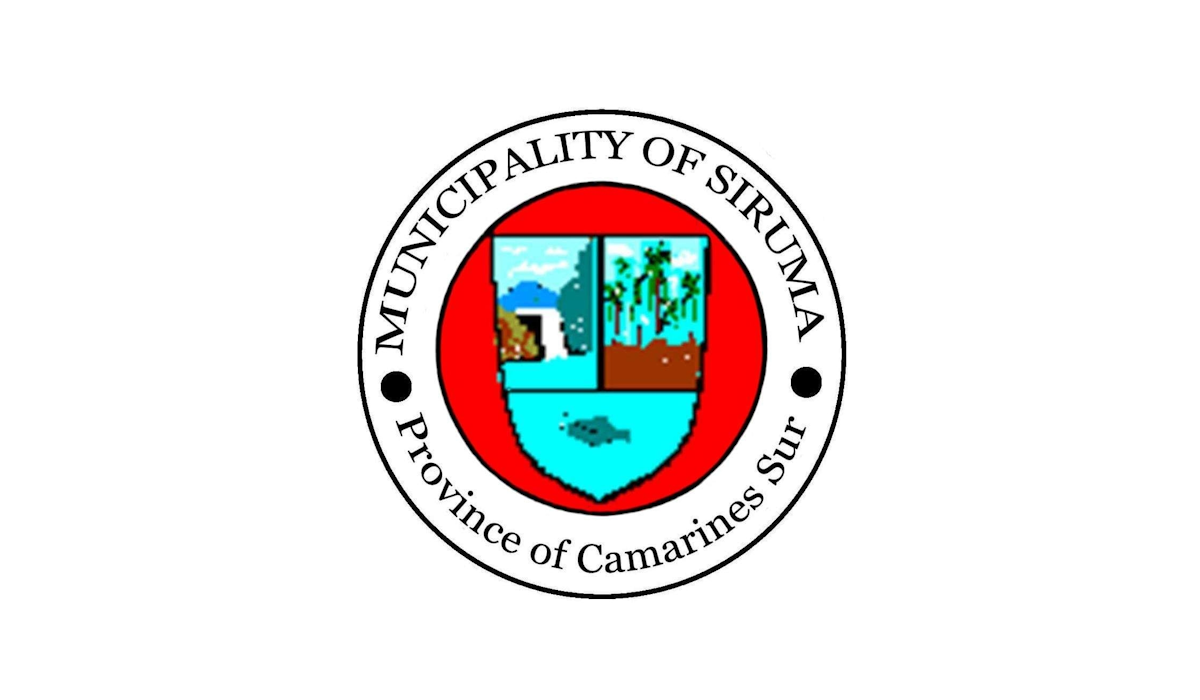
- Flag

- Map of Camarines Sur with Siruma highlighted
- Interactive map of Siruma
- Location within the Philippines
- Coordinates: 14°01′19″N 123°15′32″E
- Country: Philippines
- Region: Bicol Region
- Province: Camarines Sur
- District: 4th district
- Barangays: 22 (see Barangays)

Government
  - Type: Sangguniang Bayan
  - Mayor: Carina R. Polinga
  - Vice Mayor: Christopher C. San Gabriel
  - Representative: Arnulf Bryan B. Fuentebella
  - Municipal Council: Members: Dorna Tesorero Borlado; Lilibeth Ramos Aniete; Marietta Ramos Peralta; Juancho Campado; Jasmine Vier; Virgilio Balase Jr.; Eugene Vincent G. Camacho; Jaycee Robles
  - Electorate: 14,979 voters (2025)

Area
  - Total: 141.27 km^{2} (54.54 sq mi)
- Elevation: 11 m (36 ft)
- Highest elevation: 134 m (440 ft)
- Lowest elevation: −1 m (−3.3 ft)

Population (2024 census)
  - Total: 19,168
  - Density: 135.68/km^{2} (351.42/sq mi)
  - Households: 4,262

Economy
  - Income class: 4th municipal income class
  - Poverty incidence: 35.17% (2023)
  - Revenue: ₱ 131.7 million (2024)
  - Assets: ₱ 288 million (2024)
  - Expenditure: ₱ 133.5 million (2024)
  - Liabilities: ₱ 88.83 million (2024)

Service provider
  - Electricity: Camarines Sur 2 Electric Cooperative (CASURECO 2)
- Time zone: UTC+8 (PST)
- ZIP code: 4427
- PSGC: 0501735000
- IDD : area code: +63 (0)54
- Native languages: Central Bikol; Tagalog
- Crime index: 0
- Website: crohan.wix.com/sirlgu

Siruma, officially the Municipality of Siruma (Central Bikol: Banwaan kan Siruma; Tagalog: Bayan ng Siruma), is a municipality in the province of Camarines Sur, Philippines. According to the 2024 census, it has a population of 19,168 people.

== History ==
Siruma was under the jurisdiction of Quipayo, considered to be one of the oldest parishes in the Archdiocese of Nueva Caceres. Now, Quipayo is an informal district, a conglomeration of several surrounding barangays clustered about the Catholic Parish of Our Lady of Immaculate Conception.

On October 19, 1846, a decree was implemented by Governor General Narciso Claveria which restructured the territorial domain of the province. It was during this time that Siruma was ceded to Camarines Norte.

It was said that the town's name was derived from the name of an island called "Matandang Siruma". The word "siruma" comes from the local vernacular sirum which is a "small, red ant". A myth was told that a certain capitan encountered a swarm of small red ants during his overnight stay in one of the places in Siruma, thus, calling the place as "masirum".

== Geography ==
=== Barangays ===
Siruma is politically subdivided into 22 barangays. Each barangay consists of puroks and some have sitios.

- Bagong Sirang
- Bahao
- Boboan
- Butawanan
- Cabugao
- Fundado
- Homestead
- La Purisima
- Mabuhay
- Malaconini
- Matandang Siruma
- Nalayahan
- Pinitan
- Poblacion
- Pamintan-Bantilan
- Salvacion
- San Andres
- San Ramon (Daldagon)
- Sulpa
- Tandoc
- Tongo-Bantigue
- Vito

=== Climate ===
Climate data for Siruma, Camarines Sur
Month	Jan	Feb	Mar	Apr	May	Jun	Jul	Aug	Sep	Oct	Nov	Dec	Year
Mean daily maximum °C (°F)	31 (88)	30 (86)	33 (91)	35 (95)	36 (97)	36 (97)	35 (95)	34 (93)	35 (95)	33 (91)	32 (90)	31 (88)	33 (92)
Mean daily minimum °C (°F)	27 (81)	27 (81)	28 (82)	30 (86)	31 (88)	31 (88)	30 (86)	30 (86)	30 (86)	29 (84)	28 (82)	28 (82)	29 (84)
Average precipitation mm (inches)	62.63 (2.47)	114.71 (4.52)	41.44 (1.63)	56.32 (2.22)	105.22 (4.14)	175.86 (6.92)	192.89 (7.59)	110.61 (4.35)	130.78 (5.15)	546.13 (21.50)	232.9 (9.17)	462 (18.2)	2,231.49 (87.86)
Average rainy days	21	25	14	17	23	29	31	23	27	29	29	31	299
Source: World Weather Online (modeled/calculated data, not measured locally)

== Demographics ==
Population census of Siruma

Year	Pop.	±% p.a.
1903	1,321	—
1918	1,194	−0.67%
1939	5,851	+7.86%
1948	5,245	−1.21%
1960	9,307	+4.89%
1970	9,373	+0.07%
1975	10,435	+2.18%
1980	11,613	+2.16%

Year	Pop.	±% p.a.
1990	13,103	+1.21%
1995	13,870	+1.07%
2000	16,339	+3.57%
2007	17,035	+0.58%
2010	17,050	+0.03%
2015	17,764	+0.78%
2020	19,419	+1.89%
2024	19,168	−0.31%

Source: Philippine Statistics Authority

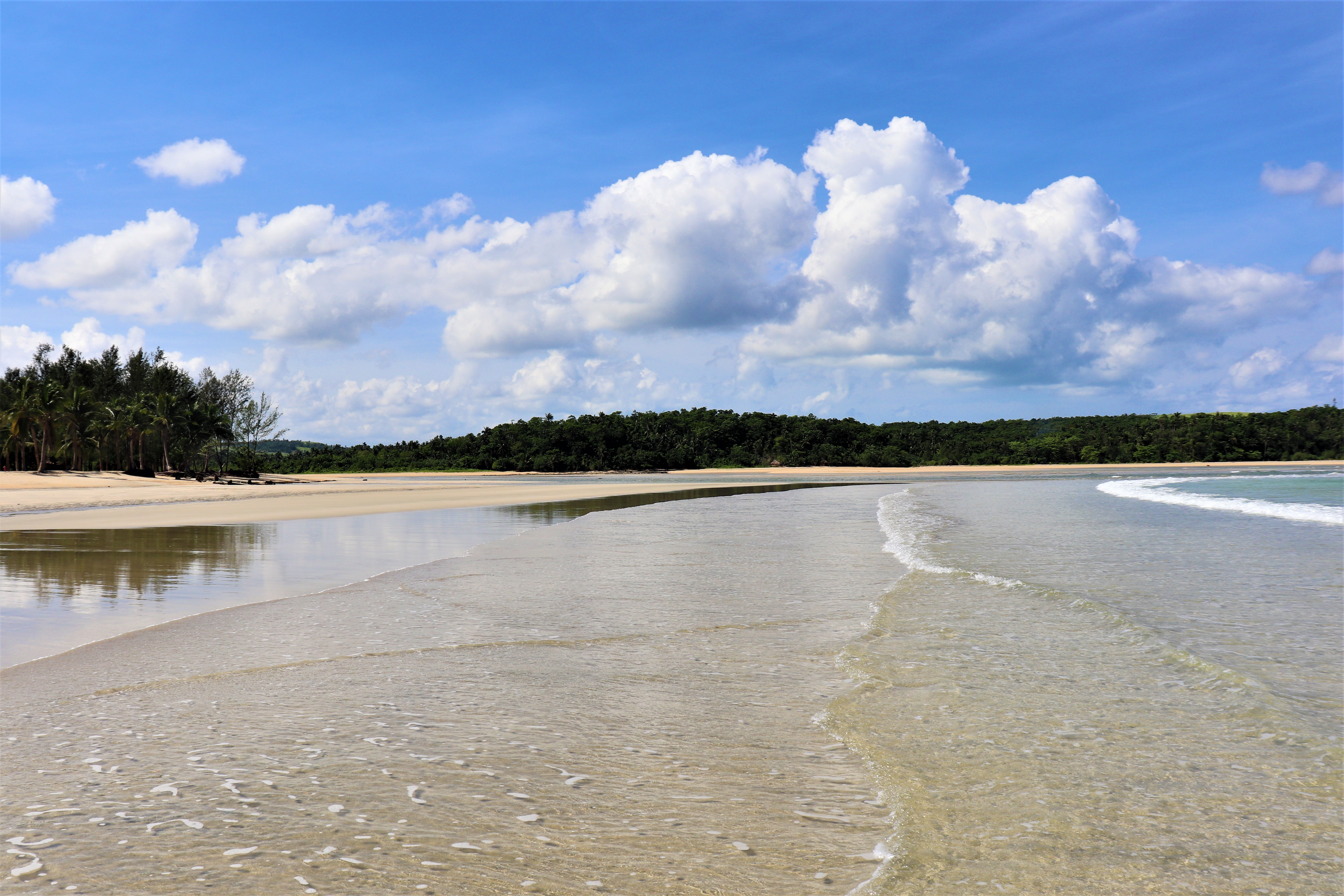
Siruma beach

In the 2024 census, the population of Siruma was 19,168 people, with a density of 140 inhabitants per square kilometre or 360 inhabitants per square mile.

== Economy ==
Poverty incidence of Siruma (%)

Source: Philippine Statistics Authority

== Education ==
The Siruma Schools District Office governs all educational institutions within the municipality. It oversees the management and operations of all private and public, from primary to secondary schools.

=== Primary and elementary schools ===
- Bagong Sirang Elementary School
- Bahao Elementary School
- Boboan Elementary School
- Butawanan Elementary School
- Cabugao Elementary School
- Daldagon Elementary School
- Elon Elementary School
- Fundado Elementary School
- Mabuhay Elementary School
- Nalayahan Elementary School
- Penitan Elementary School
- Salvacion Elementary School
- San Andres Elementary School
- Siruma Central School
- Sulpa Elementary School
- Tandoc Elementary School
- Vito Elementary School

=== Secondary schools ===
- Siruma High School (Fundado High School Annex)
- Siruma National High School
- Tandoc National High School
- Vito National High School
