= Partido (historical province) =

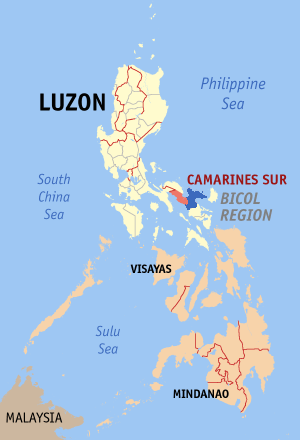
Proposed new province of Nueva Camarines would be created in the Partido area.

The Partido is a district in Camarines Sur, a province of the Philippines, that was formerly known as the Partido de Ibalon. The Spanish divided the Bicol Region into two distinct areas at the present province of Camarines Sur, the southern part becoming known as the Partido.

The northern, upper portion included present-day Camalig, Albay, and all the towns of Camarines Sur and Camarines Norte, and was called “Partido de Camarines”. The southern portion comprised the region south of Camalig, Sorsogon, the islands of Masbate and Catanduanes, was called “Partido de Ibalon”, which was later simply called "Partido".

The proposed province of Nueva Camarines would be what was once the Partido. Partido State University meanwhile takes its name from the former administrative division.

== See also ==
- Partido Development Administration
