= Sagñay =

Municipality in Camarines Sur, Philippines

- Municipality
- Municipality of Sagñay
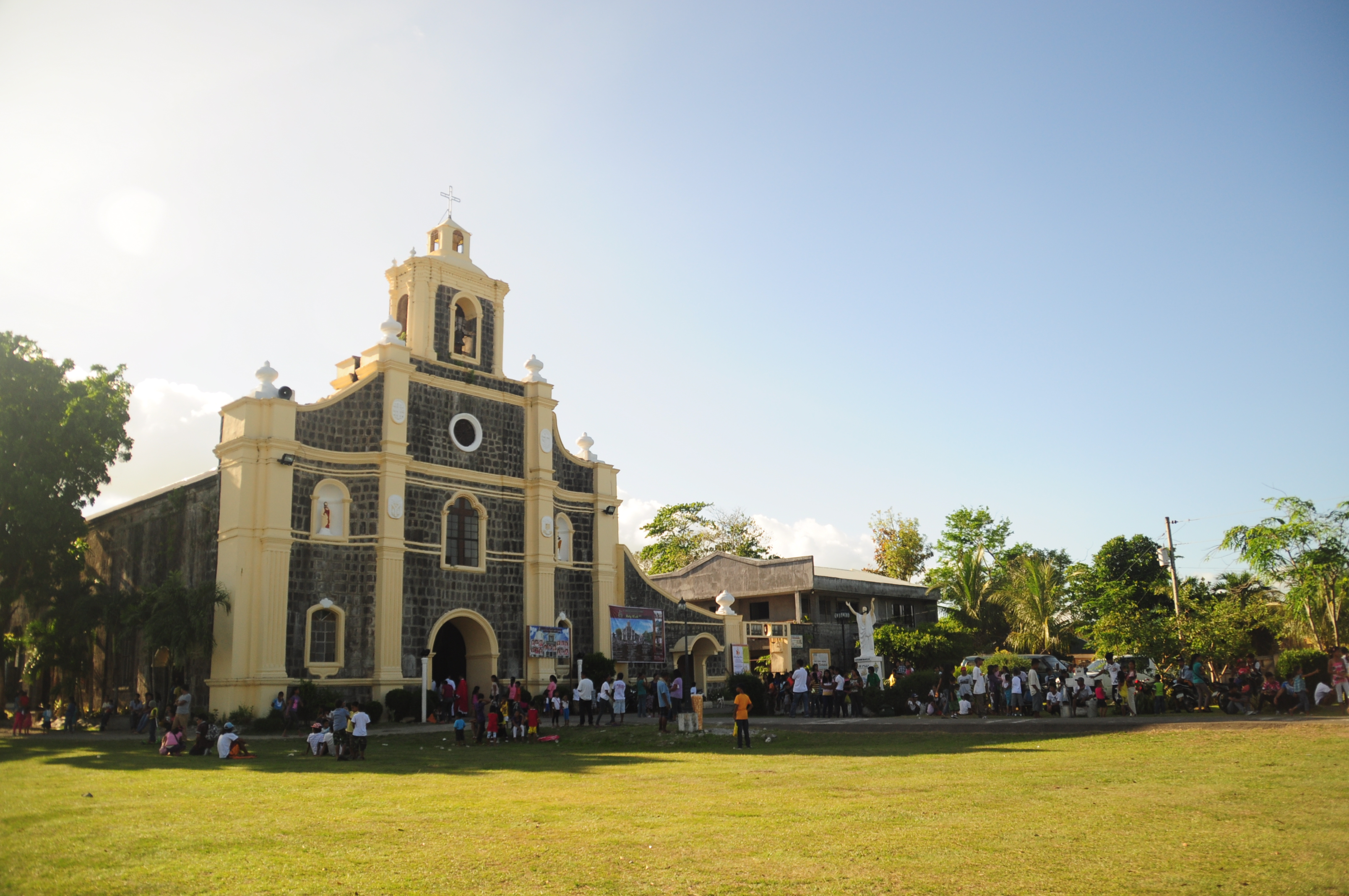
- Saint Andrew the Apostle Church

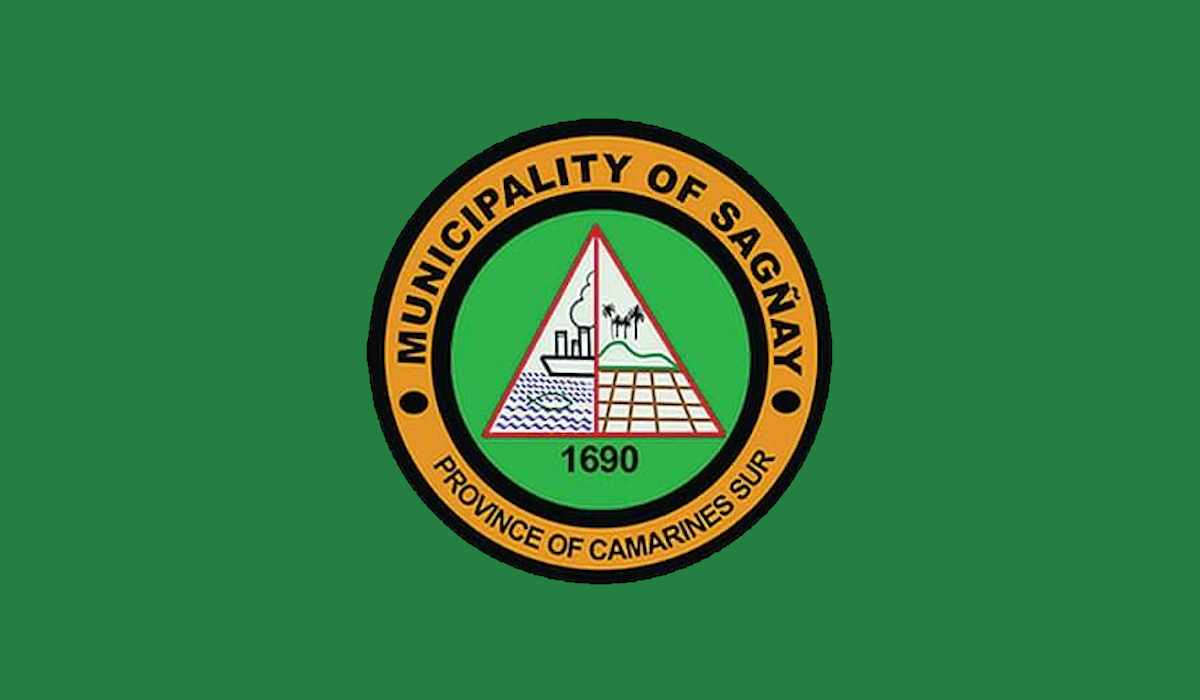
- Flag

- Map of Camarines Sur with Sagñay highlighted
- Interactive map of Sagñay
- Location within the Philippines
- Coordinates: 13°36′14″N 123°31′24″E
- Country: Philippines
- Region: Bicol Region
- Province: Camarines Sur
- District: 4th district
- Founded: November 30, 1684
- Barangays: 19 (see Barangays)

Government
  - Type: Sangguniang Bayan
  - Mayor: John Vincent B. Fuentebella
  - Vice Mayor: Harold Bryan A. San Felipe
  - Representative: Arnulf Bryan B. Fuentebella
  - Municipal Council: Members: Paolo Y. Chavez; Anderson E. Sical; Ofelia L. Lwin; Felix S. Fuentebella V; Delfin C. Amatorio; Felix O. del Castillo Jr.; Noe B. Sorita; Jonathan P. Brutas
  - Electorate: 23,602 voters (2025)

Area
  - Total: 154.76 km^{2} (59.75 sq mi)
- Elevation: 135 m (443 ft)
- Highest elevation: 891 m (2,923 ft)
- Lowest elevation: 0 m (0 ft)

Population (2024 census)
  - Total: 37,087
  - Density: 239.64/km^{2} (620.67/sq mi)
  - Households: 8,249

Economy
  - Income class: 2nd municipal income class
  - Poverty incidence: 34.87% (2023)
  - Revenue: ₱ 183 million (2024)
  - Assets: ₱ 629.9 million (2024)
  - Expenditure: ₱ 185.3 million (2024)
  - Liabilities: ₱ 156.8 million (2024)

Service provider
  - Electricity: Camarines Sur 4 Electric Cooperative (CASURECO 4)
- Time zone: UTC+8 (PST)
- ZIP code: 4421
- PSGC: 0501731000
- IDD : area code: +63 (0)54
- Native languages: Central Bikol; Tagalog
- Feast date: November 30
- Catholic diocese: Archdiocese of Cáceres
- Patron saint: Andrew the Apostle

Sagñay, [saˈŋaj], officially the Municipality of Sagñay (Central Bikol: Banwaan kan Sagñay; Tagalog: Bayan ng Sagñay), is a municipality in the province of Camarines Sur in the Philippines. According to the 2024 census, it has a population of 37,087 people.

== History ==
Sagñay was established in the late 17th century by the Spanish friars. Like the town of Lagonoy, Sagñay also formed part of the province of Albay but it was separated in 1846 by order of Governor-General Narciso Clavería.

Saint Andrew’s Parish was founded the same year Sagñay became a separate town. The town's annual fiesta is held every November 30, Saint Andrew’s Day.

== Geography ==
Sagñay has a land area of 154.76 sq kilometers (59.75 miles).

Atulayan Island is under the jurisdiction of this municipality. Sagñay is 34 kilometres (21 mi) from Pili, 484 kilometres (301 mi) from Manila, and 79 kilometres (49 mi) from Legazpi City.

=== Climate ===
Climate data for Sagñay, Camarines Sur
Month	Jan	Feb	Mar	Apr	May	Jun	Jul	Aug	Sep	Oct	Nov	Dec	Year
Mean daily maximum °C (°F)	31 (88)	30 (86)	32 (90)	35 (95)	35 (95)	35 (95)	34 (93)	33 (91)	34 (93)	32 (90)	30 (86)	30 (86)	33 (91)
Mean daily minimum °C (°F)	26 (79)	26 (79)	28 (82)	30 (86)	31 (88)	30 (86)	29 (84)	29 (84)	29 (84)	28 (82)	27 (81)	27 (81)	28 (83)
Average precipitation mm (inches)	252.8 (9.95)	82.88 (3.26)	137.93 (5.43)	63.69 (2.51)	78.31 (3.08)	229.42 (9.03)	288.31 (11.35)	280.99 (11.06)	112.39 (4.42)	210.87 (8.30)	599.07 (23.59)	194.80 (7.67)	2,531.46 (99.65)
Average rainy days	29	24	28	18	20	24	29	31	27	27	30	29	316
Source: World Weather Online (modeled/calculated data, not measured locally)

=== Barangays ===
Sagñay is subdivided into 19 barangays. Each barangay consists of puroks and some have sitios.

- Aniog
- Atulayan
- Bongalon
- Buracan
- Catalotoan
- Del Carmen (Poblacion)
- Kilantaao
- Kilomaon
- Mabca
- Minadongjol
- Nato
- Patitinan
- San Antonio (Poblacion)
- San Isidro (Poblacion)
- San Roque (Poblacion)
- Santo Niño
- Sibaguan
- Tinorongan
- Turague

== Demographics ==
Population census of Sagñay

Year	Pop.	±% p.a.
1903	5,333	—
1918	5,429	+0.12%
1939	7,052	+1.25%
1948	8,378	+1.93%
1960	14,004	+4.37%
1970	16,968	+1.94%
1975	18,013	+1.21%
1980	20,241	+2.36%

Year	Pop.	±% p.a.
1990	22,422	+1.03%
1995	26,530	+3.20%
2000	26,619	+0.07%
2007	29,082	+1.23%
2010	31,314	+2.73%
2015	34,546	+1.89%
2020	36,841	+1.36%
2024	37,087	+0.16%

Source: Philippine Statistics Authority

In the 2024 census, the population of Sagñay was 37,087 people, with a density of 240 inhabitants per square kilometre or 620 inhabitants per square mile.

== Economy ==
Poverty incidence of Sagñay (%)

Source: Philippine Statistics Authority

== Education ==
The Sagñay Schools District Office governs all educational institutions within the municipality. It oversees the management and operations of all private and public, from primary to secondary schools.

=== Primary and elementary schools ===
- Aniog Elementary School
- Atulayan Elementary School
- Bolo Elementary School
- Bongalon Elementary School
- Buracan Elementary School
- Catalotoan Elementary School
- Catalotoan SDA Multigrade School
- Kilantaao Elementary School
- Mabca Elementary School
- Minadongjol Elementary School
- Nato Elementary School
- Odiongan Elementary School
- Patitinan Elementary School
- Quilomaon Elementary School
- Sagñay Central School
- Sibaguan Elementary School
- Sto. Niño Primary School
- Turague Elementary School

=== Secondary schools ===
- Catalotoan National High School
- Jose T. Fuentebella National High School (Formerly Patitinan High School)
- Nato National High School
- Salvacion High School
- Sibaguan Agro-Industrial High School
- St. Andrew Academy
- Tinorongan National High School

== Notable personalities ==
- Allen Ansay - actor, model, and singer

== Gallery ==
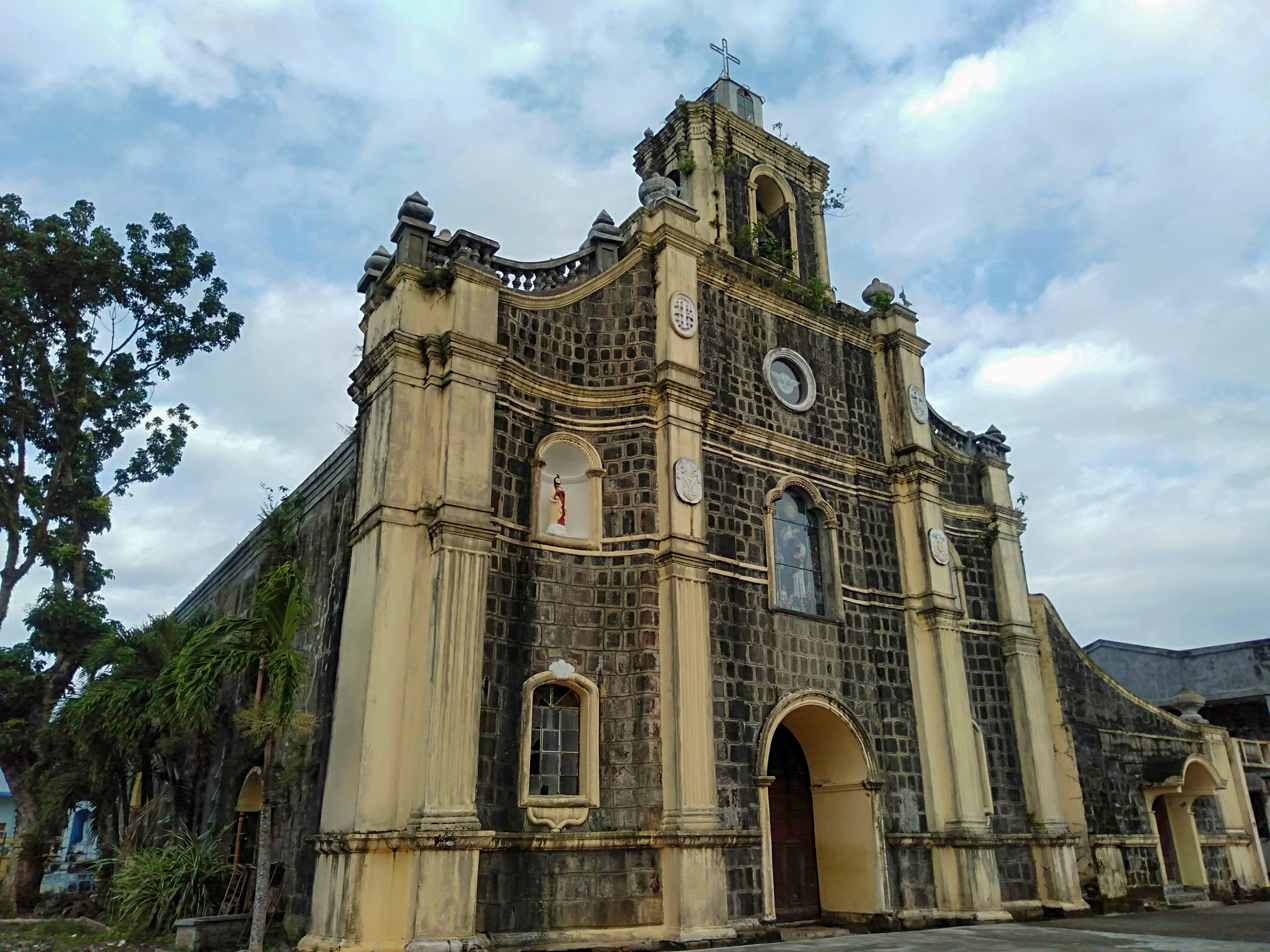
St. Andrew Church

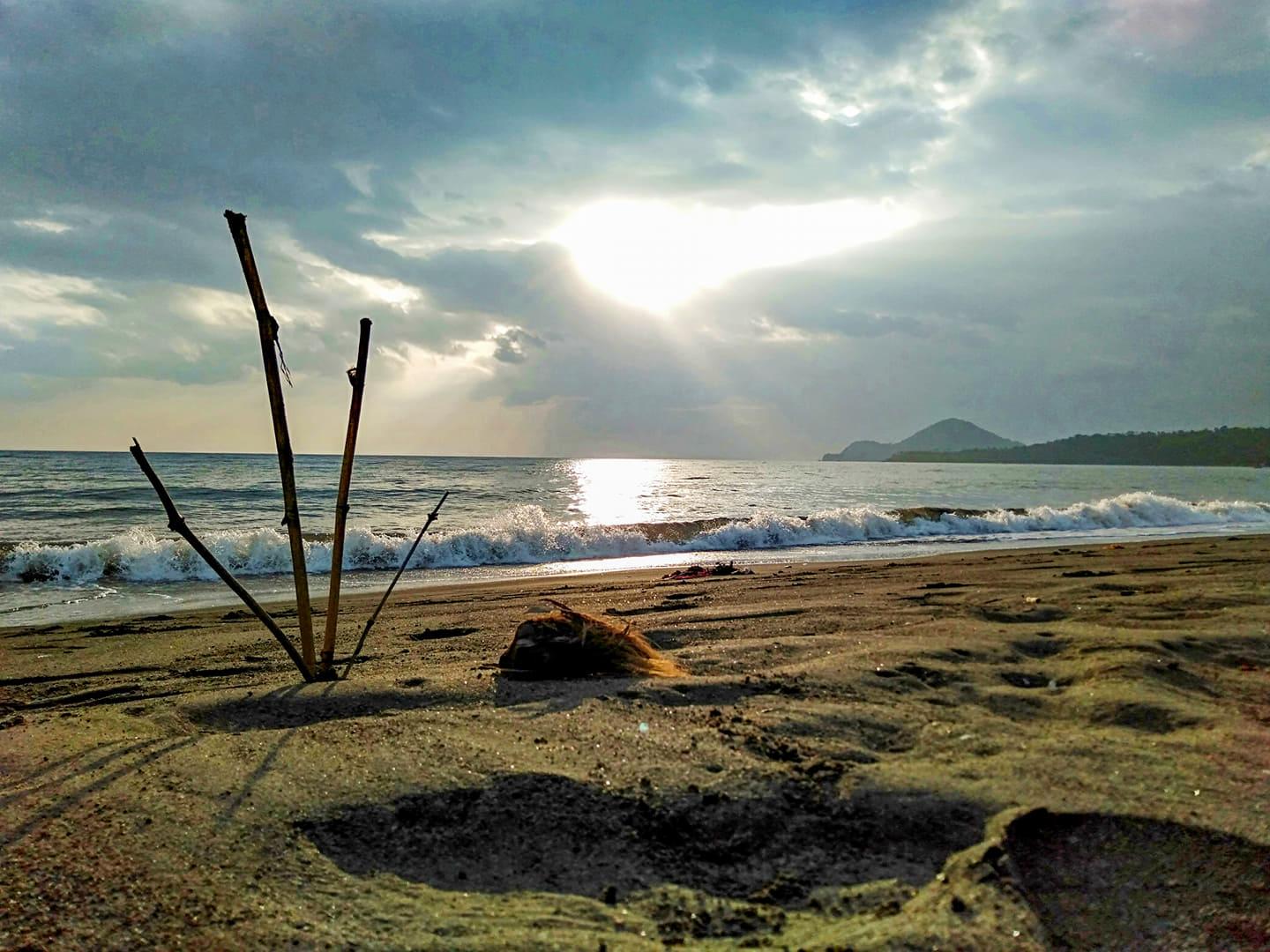
Nato Beach

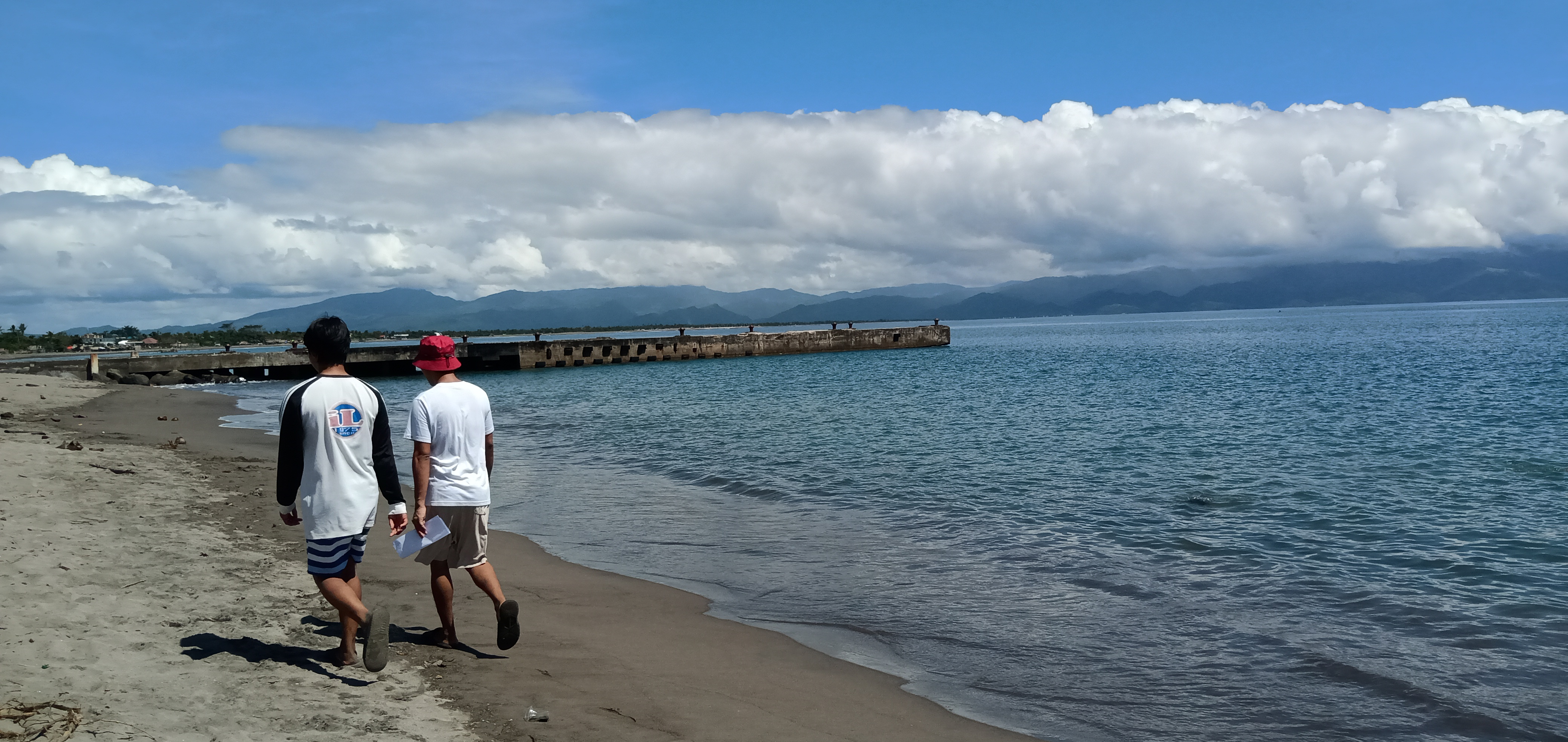
Nato Port

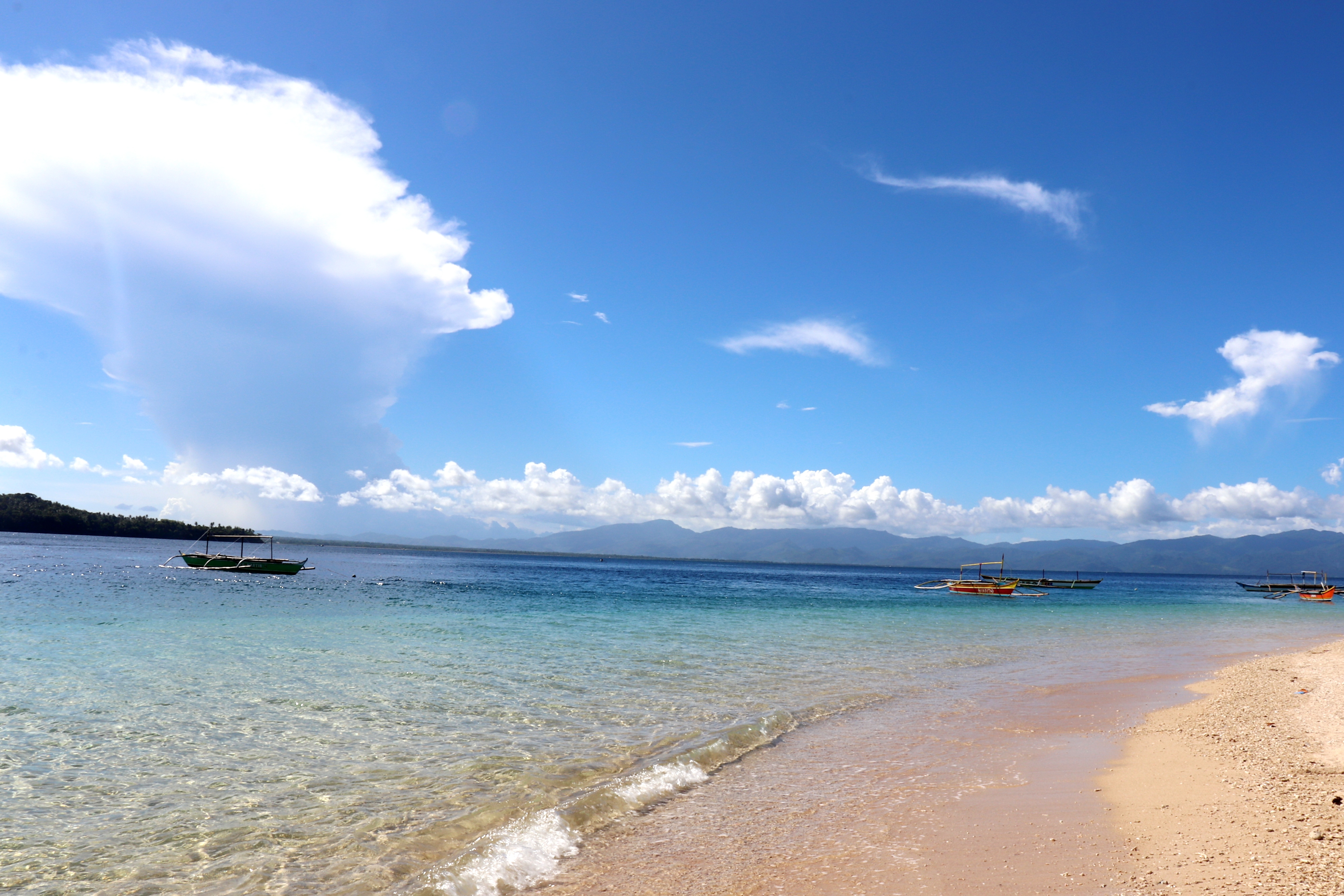
Atulayan Island
