= List of Philippine provinces and regions by Human Development Index =

This is a list of regions and provinces of the Philippines by Human Development Index (HDI). The HDI is a statistic composite index of life expectancy, education (mean years of schooling completed and expected years of schooling upon entering the education system), and per capita income indicators, which is used to rank countries into four tiers of human development.

== Regions ==
These HDI values are from the Global Data Lab, covering the year 2023, published in 2025.

Rank	Region	HDI (2023)
1	Metro Manila	0.755
2	Cordillera Administrative Region	0.749
3	Central Luzon	0.735
4	Calabarzon	0.734
5	Cagayan Valley	0.728
6	Western Visayas	0.723
7	Northern Mindanao	0.721
8	Caraga	0.720
—	Philippines (average)	0.720
9	Ilocos	0.719
10	Davao	0.718
11	Eastern Visayas	0.706
12	Central Visayas	0.704
13	Mimaropa	0.703
14	Soccsksargen	0.693
15	Bicol	0.689
16	Zamboanga Peninsula	0.683
17	Bangsamoro	0.638

== Provinces ==
These HDI values below are based on the preliminary estimates of the 2019 Provincial Human Development Index by the Philippine Statistics Authority.

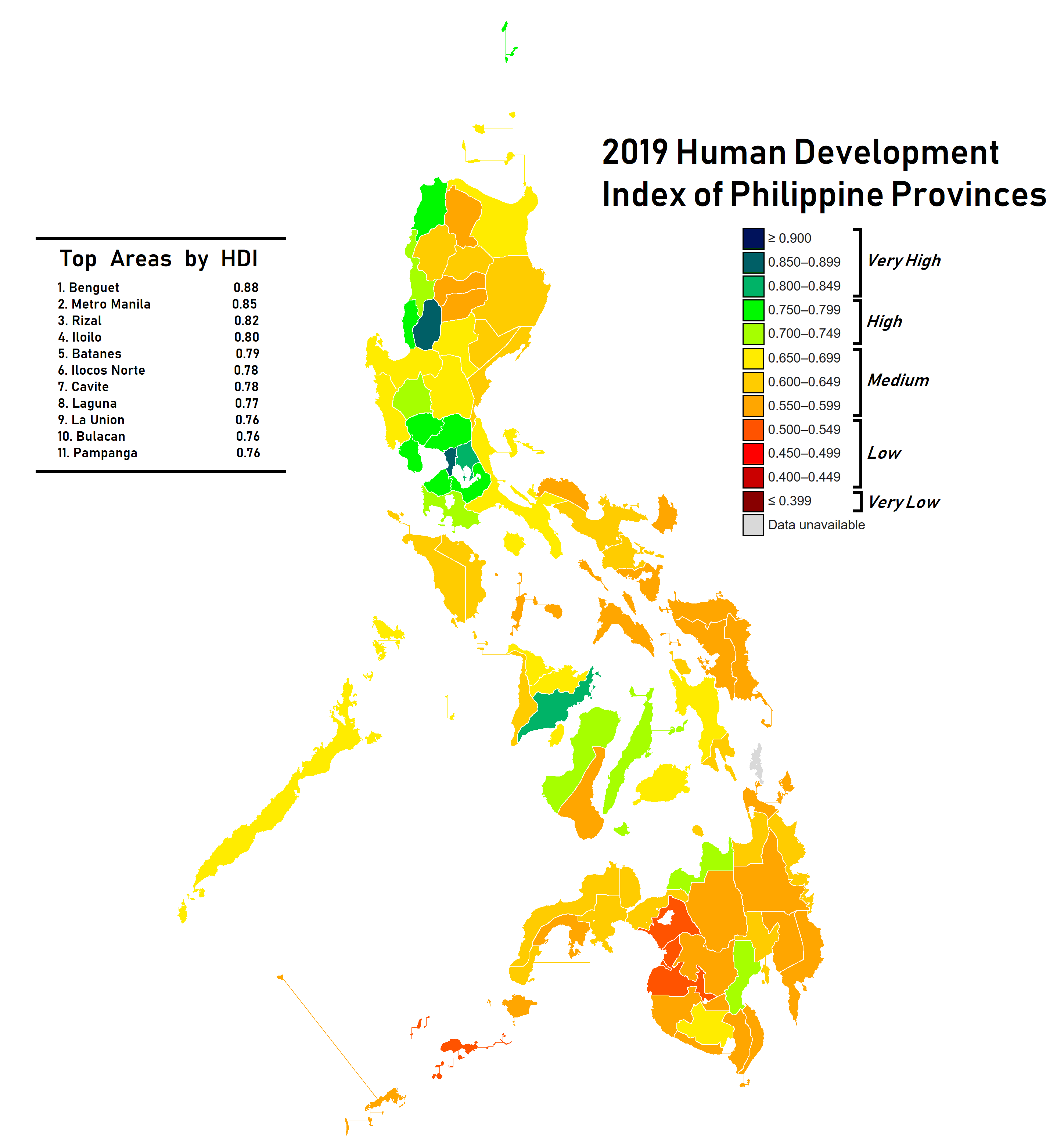

=== List ===
Rank (Note: T indicates tie)	Province	HDI (2019)	
1	Benguet	0.88	Very high
2	Metro Manila	0.85	Very high
3T	Ilocos Norte	0.82	Very high
3T	Rizal	0.82	Very high
5	Iloilo	0.80	Very high
6	Batanes	0.79	High
7	Cavite	0.78	High
8	Laguna	0.77	High
9T	Bulacan	0.76	High
9T	La Union	0.76	High
9T	Pampanga	0.76	High
12	Bataan	0.75	High
13T	Batangas	0.74	High
13T	Cebu	0.74	High
15	Siquijor	0.73	High
16	Tarlac	0.72	High
–	Philippines (average)	0.718	High
17T	Misamis Oriental	0.71	High
17T	Negros Occidental	0.71	High
19T	Davao del Sur	0.70	High
19T	Ilocos Sur	0.70	High
21T	Guimaras	0.69	Medium
21T	Nueva Vizcaya	0.69	Medium
21T	Zambales	0.69	Medium
24T	Cagayan	0.68	Medium
24T	Quezon	0.68	Medium
26T	Marinduque	0.67	Medium
26T	Nueva Ecija	0.67	Medium
26T	South Cotabato	0.67	Medium
29T	Aklan	0.66	Medium
29T	Bohol	0.66	Medium
29T	Palawan	0.66	Medium
32T	Capiz	0.65	Medium
32T	Leyte	0.65	Medium
32T	Pangasinan	0.65	Medium
35T	Antique	0.64	Medium
35T	Isabela	0.64	Medium
35T	Zamboanga del Norte	0.64	Medium
35T	Zamboanga del Sur	0.64	Medium
39T	Aurora	0.63	Medium
39T	Biliran	0.63	Medium
39T	Lanao del Norte	0.63	Medium
39T	Quirino	0.63	Medium
43T	Agusan del Norte	0.62	Medium
43T	Oriental Mindoro	0.62	Medium
45T	Abra	0.61	Medium
45T	Kalinga	0.61	Medium
45T	Occidental Mindoro	0.61	Medium
45T	Southern Leyte	0.61	Medium
49T	Misamis Occidental	0.60	Medium
49T	Albay	0.60	Medium
49T	Camarines Sur	0.60	Medium
49T	Camiguin	0.60	Medium
49T	Davao del Norte	0.60	Medium
49T	Surigao del Sur	0.60	Medium
55T	Camarines Norte	0.59	Medium
55T	Catanduanes	0.59	Medium
55T	Ifugao	0.59	Medium
55T	Negros Oriental	0.59	Medium
55T	Zamboanga Sibugay	0.59	Medium
60T	Davao de Oro	0.58	Medium
60T	Romblon	0.58	Medium
60T	Sorsogon	0.58	Medium
63T	Agusan del Sur	0.57	Medium
63T	Basilan	0.57	Medium
63T	Cotabato	0.57	Medium
63T	Mountain Province	0.57	Medium
63T	Northern Samar	0.57	Medium
63T	Sarangani	0.57	Medium
63T	Sulu	0.57	Medium
63T	Surigao del Norte	0.57	Medium
71T	Bukidnon	0.56	Medium
71T	Davao Oriental	0.56	Medium
71T	Masbate	0.56	Medium
71T	Sultan Kudarat	0.56	Medium
71T	Western Samar	0.56	Medium
76T	Apayao	0.55	Medium
76T	Davao Occidental	0.55	Medium
76T	Eastern Samar	0.55	Medium
79T	Maguindanao	0.57	Medium
79T	Tawi-Tawi	0.58	Medium

== See also ==
- Poverty in the Philippines
- List of Philippine provinces by poverty rate
- List of Philippine provinces by population
