= Provinces of the Philippines =

Administrative division of the Philippines

- Category: Province
- Location: Philippines
- Found in: Administrative and autonomous regions
- Number: 82 (as of 2022)
- Populations: 17,246 (Batanes) – 4,344,829 (Cavite) (Note: If the populations of the independent cities of Cebu, Lapu-Lapu, and Mandaue are included, the province of Cebu is considered the most populous in the country, with a total population of 5,151,274. Excluding these cities, its population is 3,325,385.)
- Areas: 219.01 km^{2} (84.56 sq mi) for Batanes – 17,030.75 km^{2} (6,575.61 sq mi) for Palawan
- Government: Provincial government
- Subdivisions: Municipalities and component cities Barangays

In the Philippines, provinces (Filipino: lalawigan or probinsiya) are the country's primary political and administrative divisions. There are 82 provinces, which are further subdivided into component cities and municipalities. The local government units in the National Capital Region, as well as independent cities, are administratively independent of any provincial government. Each province is governed by an elected governor and an elected legislative body known as the Sangguniang Panlalawigan.

The provinces are grouped into 18 regions based on geographic, cultural, and ethnolinguistic characteristics. Thirteen of these regions are numerically designated from north to south, while the National Capital Region, the Cordillera Administrative Region, the Southwestern Tagalog Region (Mimaropa), the Negros Island Region, and the Bangsamoro Autonomous Region in Muslim Mindanao are identified by their names or acronyms.

Each province is a member of the League of Provinces of the Philippines, an organization that represents provincial governments and promotes cooperation on issues affecting provincial administration.

== Government ==
A provincial government is autonomous of other provinces within the republic. Each province is governed by two main elected branches of the government: executive and legislative. Judicial affairs are separated from provincial governance and are administered by the Supreme Court of the Philippines. Each province has at least one branch of a Regional Trial Court.

=== Executive ===
The provincial governor is chief executive and head of each province. Provincial governors are elected to a term of three years and limited to three consecutive terms and appoint the directors of each provincial department which include the office of administration, engineering office, information office, legal office, and treasury office.

=== Legislative ===
The vice governor acts as the president for each Sangguniang Panlalawigan (SP; "Provincial Board"), the province's legislative body. Every SP is composed of regularly elected members from provincial districts, as well as ex officio members. The number of regularly elected SP members allotted to each province is determined by its income class. First- and second-class provinces are provided ten regular SP members; third- and fourth-class provinces have eight, while fifth- and sixth-class provinces have six. Exceptions are provinces with more than five congressional districts, such as Cavite with 16 regularly elected SP members, and Cebu, Negros Occidental and Pangasinan which have twelve each.

Every SP has designated seats for ex officio members, given to the respective local presidents of the Association of Barangay Captains (ABC), Philippine Councilors' League (PCL), and Sangguniang Kabataan (SK; "Youth Council").

The vice governor and regular members of an SP are elected by the voters within the province. Ex officio members are elected by members of their respective organizations.

=== Relation to other levels of government ===
==== National government ====
National intrusion into the affairs of each provincial government is limited by the Philippine Constitution. The President of the Philippines however coordinates with provincial administrators through the Department of the Interior and Local Government. For purposes of national representation, each province is guaranteed its own congressional district, ensuring that communities across the Philippines have a voice in the House of Representatives regardless of the population of their province.

==== Cities and municipalities ====
Those classified as either "highly urbanized" or "independent component" cities are independent from the province, as provided for in Section 29 of the Local Government Code of 1991. Although such a city is a self-governing second-level entity, in many cases it is often presented as part of the province in which it is geographically located, or in the case of Zamboanga City, the province it last formed part the congressional representation of.

Local government units classified as "component" cities and municipalities are under the jurisdiction of the provincial government. In order to make sure that all component city or municipal governments act within the scope of their prescribed powers and functions, the Local Government Code mandates the provincial governor to review executive orders issued by mayors, and the Sangguniang Panlalawigan to review legislation by the Sangguniang Panlungsod (City Council) or Sangguniang Bayan (Municipal Council), of all component cities and municipalities under the province's jurisdiction.

=== Barangays ===
The provincial government does not have direct relations with individual barangays. Supervision over a barangay government is the mandate of the mayor and the Sanggunian of the component city or municipality of which the barangay in question is a part.

=== Classification ===
Provinces based on income classification.

Provinces are classified according to average annual income based on the previous 4 calendar years. Effective July 29, 2008, the thresholds for the income classes for cities are:

Class	Average annual income
First	₱450 million or more
Second	₱360 million or more but less than ₱450 million
Third	₱270 million or more but less than ₱360 million
Fourth	₱180 million or more but less than ₱270 million
Fifth	₱90 million or more but less than ₱180 million
Sixth	below ₱90 million

A province's income class determines the size of the membership of its Sangguniang Panlalawigan, and also how much it can spend on certain items, or procure through certain means.

== List ==
ISO	Province	Flag	Capital	Population		Area	Density	Founded (Note: Dates could refer to provincehood as established during the Spanish and American colonial periods, or through Republic Acts.)	Island group	Region	Total LGUs		
				%	(2024)						Mun.	City	Brgy.
PH-ABR	Abra	(Abra (province))	Bangued	0.22%	246,948	4,165.25 km^{2} (1,608.21 sq mi)	59/km^{2} (154/sq mi)	1846	Luzon	CAR	27	—	303
PH-AGN	Agusan del Norte (Note: Figures include the independent city of Butuan.)		Cabadbaran (Note: Cabadbaran has been made the official capital of the province, as per Republic Act No. 8811. However, the seat of the provincial government is still in the process of being transferred from Butuan, where the provincial government still holds office.)	0.70%	789,630	3,546.86 km^{2} (1,369.45 sq mi)	223/km^{2} (577/sq mi)	20 Sep 1907	Mindanao	XIII	10	2	253
PH-AGS	Agusan del Sur	(Agusan del Sur)	Prosperidad	0.66%	740,531	9,989.52 km^{2} (3,856.98 sq mi)	74/km^{2} (192/sq mi)	1 Jan 1970	Mindanao	XIII	13	1	314
PH-AKL	Aklan	(Aklan)	Kalibo	0.56%	634,422	1,821.42 km^{2} (703.25 sq mi)	348/km^{2} (902/sq mi)	25 Apr 1956	Visayas	VI	17	—	327
PH-ALB	Albay	(Albay)	Legazpi	1.22%	1,379,398	2,575.77 km^{2} (994.51 sq mi)	536/km^{2} (1,387/sq mi)	3 Apr 1574	Luzon	V	15	3	720
PH-ANT	Antique	(Antique (province))	San Jose de Buenavista	0.57%	643,173	2,729.17 km^{2} (1,053.74 sq mi)	236/km^{2} (610/sq mi)	10 Mar 1917	Visayas	VI	18	—	590
PH-APA	Apayao		Kabugao (Note: The province maintains another government center in Luna, where many national and provincial agencies now hold office.)	0.11%	126,587	4,413.35 km^{2} (1,704.00 sq mi)	29/km^{2} (74/sq mi)	14 Feb 1995	Luzon	CAR	7	—	133
PH-AUR	Aurora	(Aurora (province))	Baler	0.21%	240,824	3,147.32 km^{2} (1,215.19 sq mi)	77/km^{2} (198/sq mi)	13 Aug 1979	Luzon	III	8	—	151
PH-BAS	Basilan (Note: Figures include the city of Isabela.)	(Basilan)	Lamitan	0.61%	693,244	1,327.23 km^{2} (512.45 sq mi)	522/km^{2} (1,353/sq mi)	27 Dec 1973	Mindanao	BARMM (Note: The city of Isabela is regionally served by the offices of Region IX.)	11	2	255
PH-BAN	Bataan	(Bataan)	Balanga	0.79%	891,440	1,373.98 km^{2} (530.50 sq mi)	649/km^{2} (1,682/sq mi)	11 Jan 1754	Luzon	III	11	1	237
PH-BTN	Batanes	(Batanes)	Basco	0.02%	18,937	219.01 km^{2} (84.56 sq mi)	86/km^{2} (224/sq mi)	26 Jun 1783	Luzon	II	6	—	29
PH-BTG	Batangas	(Batangas)	Batangas City	2.66%	2,994,795	3,119.72 km^{2} (1,204.53 sq mi)	960/km^{2} (2,486/sq mi)	8 Dec 1581	Luzon	IV-A	29	5	1,078
PH-BEN	Benguet (Note: Figures include the independent city of Baguio.)	(Benguet)	La Trinidad	0.75%	841,616	2,826.59 km^{2} (1,091.35 sq mi)	298/km^{2} (771/sq mi)	1 Jun 1536	Luzon	CAR	13	1	269
PH-BIL	Biliran	(Biliran (province))	Naval	0.16%	184,095	536.01 km^{2} (206.95 sq mi)	343/km^{2} (890/sq mi)	11 May 1992	Visayas	VIII	8	—	132
PH-BOH	Bohol	(Bohol)	Tagbilaran	1.25%	1,412,726	4,820.95 km^{2} (1,861.38 sq mi)	293/km^{2} (759/sq mi)	22 Jul 1854	Visayas	VII	47	1	1,109
PH-BUK	Bukidnon	(Bukidnon)	Malaybalay	1.42%	1,601,902	10,498.59 km^{2} (4,053.53 sq mi)	153/km^{2} (395/sq mi)	10 Mar 1917	Mindanao	X	20	2	464
PH-BUL	Bulacan	(Bulacan)	Malolos	3.44%	3,876,806	2,796.10 km^{2} (1,079.58 sq mi)	1,387/km^{2} (3,591/sq mi)	15 Aug 1578	Luzon	III	21	3	569
PH-CAG	Cagayan	(Cagayan)	Tuguegarao	1.14%	1,284,676	9,295.75 km^{2} (3,589.11 sq mi)	138/km^{2} (358/sq mi)	29 Jun 1583	Luzon	II	28	1	820
PH-CAN	Camarines Norte	(Camarines Norte)	Daet	0.54%	604,666	2,320.07 km^{2} (895.78 sq mi)	261/km^{2} (675/sq mi)	15 Apr 1920	Luzon	V	12	—	282
PH-CAS	Camarines Sur (Note: Figures include the independent city of Naga.)		Pili	1.83%	2,063,314	5,497.03 km^{2} (2,122.42 sq mi)	375/km^{2} (972/sq mi)	27 May 1579	Luzon	V	35	2	1,063
PH-CAM	Camiguin	(Camiguin)	Mambajao	0.08%	94,892	237.95 km^{2} (91.87 sq mi)	399/km^{2} (1,033/sq mi)	18 Jun 1966	Mindanao	X	5	—	58
PH-CAP	Capiz		Roxas City	0.74%	835,098	2,594.64 km^{2} (1,001.80 sq mi)	322/km^{2} (834/sq mi)	10 Mar 1917	Visayas	VI	16	1	473
PH-CAT	Catanduanes	(Catanduanes)	Virac	0.23%	261,169	1,492.16 km^{2} (576.13 sq mi)	175/km^{2} (453/sq mi)	26 Sep 1945	Luzon	V	11	—	315
PH-CAV	Cavite	(Cavite)	Imus	4.06%	4,573,884	1,574.17 km^{2} (607.79 sq mi)	2,906/km^{2} (7,525/sq mi)	10 Mar 1614	Luzon	IV-A	15	8	829
PH-CEB	Cebu (Note: Figures include the independent cities of Cebu, Lapu-Lapu, and Mandaue.)	(Cebu)	Cebu City	4.64%	5,228,149	5,342.00 km^{2} (2,062.56 sq mi)	979/km^{2} (2,535/sq mi)	27 Apr 1565	Visayas	VII	44	9	1,203
PH-NCO	Cotabato (Note: Figures include the municipalities in the Special Geographic Area.)	(Cotabato)	Kidapawan	1.14%	1,286,142	9,008.90 km^{2} (3,478.36 sq mi)	142/km^{2} (367/sq mi)	1 Sep 1914	Mindanao	XII (Note: Except the municipalities in the Special Geographic Area, which is part of Bangsamoro.)	17	1	543
PH-COM	Davao de Oro	(Davao de Oro)	Nabunturan	0.70%	783,775	4,479.77 km^{2} (1,729.65 sq mi)	175/km^{2} (453/sq mi)	31 Jan 1998	Mindanao	XI	11	—	237
PH-DAV	Davao del Norte	(Davao del Norte)	Tagum	1.01%	1,143,931	3,426.97 km^{2} (1,323.16 sq mi)	334/km^{2} (865/sq mi)	8 May 1967	Mindanao	XI	8	3	223
PH-DAS	Davao del Sur (Note: Figures include the independent city of Davao.)	(Davao del Sur)	Digos	2.27%	2,554,076	4,607.59 km^{2} (1,779.00 sq mi)	554/km^{2} (1,436/sq mi)	1 Sep 1904	Mindanao	XI	9	2	414
PH-DVO	Davao Occidental	(Davao Occidental)	Malita	0.28%	317,598	2,163.45 km^{2} (835.31 sq mi)	147/km^{2} (380/sq mi)	28 Oct 2013	Mindanao	XI	5	—	105
PH-DAO	Davao Oriental	(Davao Oriental)	Mati	0.52%	590,042	5,679.64 km^{2} (2,192.92 sq mi)	101/km^{2} (263/sq mi)	8 May 1967	Mindanao	XI	10	1	183
PH-DIN	Dinagat Islands	(Dinagat Islands)	San Jose	0.11%	120,533	1,036.34 km^{2} (400.13 sq mi)	116/km^{2} (301/sq mi)	2 Dec 2006	Mindanao	XIII	7	—	100
PH-EAS	Eastern Samar	(Eastern Samar)	Borongan	0.42%	472,683	4,660.47 km^{2} (1,799.42 sq mi)	101/km^{2} (263/sq mi)	19 Jun 1965	Visayas	VIII	22	1	597
PH-GUI	Guimaras		Jordan	0.17%	192,874	604.57 km^{2} (233.43 sq mi)	319/km^{2} (826/sq mi)	22 May 1992	Visayas	VI	5	—	98
PH-IFU	Ifugao	(Ifugao)	Lagawe	0.19%	208,668	2,628.21 km^{2} (1,014.76 sq mi)	79/km^{2} (206/sq mi)	18 Jun 1966	Luzon	CAR	11	—	176
PH-ILN	Ilocos Norte	(Ilocos Norte)	Laoag	0.55%	618,850	3,467.89 km^{2} (1,338.96 sq mi)	178/km^{2} (462/sq mi)	2 Feb 1792	Luzon	I	21	2	559
PH-ILS	Ilocos Sur	(Ilocos Sur)	Vigan	0.63%	709,991	2,596.00 km^{2} (1,002.32 sq mi)	273/km^{2} (708/sq mi)	1572	Luzon	I	32	2	768
PH-ILI	Iloilo (Note: Figures include the independent city of Iloilo.)	(Iloilo)	Iloilo City	2.27%	2,556,344	5,079.17 km^{2} (1,961.08 sq mi)	503/km^{2} (1,304/sq mi)	1566	Visayas	VI	42	2	1,901
PH-ISA	Isabela (Note: Figures include the independent city of Santiago.)	(Isabela (province))	Ilagan	1.54%	1,733,048	12,414.93 km^{2} (4,793.43 sq mi)	140/km^{2} (362/sq mi)	1 May 1856	Luzon	II	34	3	1,055
PH-KAL	Kalinga	(Kalinga (province))	Tabuk	0.21%	235,391	3,231.25 km^{2} (1,247.59 sq mi)	73/km^{2} (189/sq mi)	18 Jun 1966	Luzon	CAR	7	1	153
PH-LUN	La Union	(La Union)	San Fernando	0.73%	825,072	1,497.70 km^{2} (578.27 sq mi)	551/km^{2} (1,427/sq mi)	2 Mar 1850	Luzon	I	19	1	576
PH-LAG	Laguna	(Laguna (province))	Santa Cruz	3.27%	3,687,345	1,917.85 km^{2} (740.49 sq mi)	1,923/km^{2} (4,980/sq mi)	28 Jul 1571	Luzon	IV-A	24	6	681
PH-LAN	Lanao del Norte (Note: Figures include the independent city of Iligan.)	(Lanao del Norte)	Tubod	1.00%	1,129,857	4,159.94 km^{2} (1,606.16 sq mi)	272/km^{2} (703/sq mi)	4 Jul 1959	Mindanao	X	22	1	506
PH-LAS	Lanao del Sur	(Lanao del Sur)	Marawi	1.21%	1,368,137	3,872.89 km^{2} (1,495.33 sq mi)	353/km^{2} (915/sq mi)	1 Sep 1914	Mindanao	BARMM	39	1	1,159
PH-LEY	Leyte (Note: Figures include the independent cities of Ormoc and Tacloban.)	(Leyte (province))	Tacloban	1.85%	2,082,811	6,515.05 km^{2} (2,515.47 sq mi)	320/km^{2} (828/sq mi)	5 Apr 1712	Visayas	VIII	40	3	1,641
PH-MDN	Maguindanao del Norte (Note: Figures include the independent city of Cotabato.)		Datu Odin Sinsuat	1.00%	1,124,811	4,752.47 km^{2} (1,834.94 sq mi)	282/km^{2} (730/sq mi)	17 Sep 2022	Mindanao	BARMM	12	1	189
PH-MDS	Maguindanao del Sur		Buluan	0.72%	813,243	4,973.48 km^{2} (1,920.27 sq mi)	164/km^{2} (424/sq mi)	4 Nov 1802	Mindanao	BARMM	24	—	167
PH-MAD	Marinduque	(Marinduque)	Boac	0.20%	226,522	952.58 km^{2} (367.79 sq mi)	238/km^{2} (616/sq mi)	21 Feb 1920	Luzon	Mimaropa	6	—	218
PH-MAS	Masbate	(Masbate)	Masbate City	0.81%	910,813	4,151.78 km^{2} (1,603.01 sq mi)	219/km^{2} (568/sq mi)	18 Mar 1901	Luzon	V	20	1	550
PH-MSC	Misamis Occidental	(Misamis Occidental)	Oroquieta	0.55%	621,993	2,055.22 km^{2} (793.52 sq mi)	303/km^{2} (784/sq mi)	8 Nov 1929	Mindanao	X	14	3	490
PH-MSR	Misamis Oriental (Note: Figures include the independent city of Cagayan de Oro.)	(Misamis Oriental)	Cagayan de Oro	1.53%	1,729,682	3,544.32 km^{2} (1,368.47 sq mi)	488/km^{2} (1,264/sq mi)	15 May 1901	Mindanao	X	23	3	504
PH-MOU	Mountain Province	(Mountain Province)	Bontoc	0.13%	149,775	2,157.38 km^{2} (832.97 sq mi)	69/km^{2} (180/sq mi)	1846	Luzon	CAR	10	—	144
PH-NEC	Negros Occidental (Note: Figures include the independent city of Bacolod.)	(Negros Occidental)	Bacolod	2.93%	3,305,264	7,965.21 km^{2} (3,075.38 sq mi)	415/km^{2} (1,075/sq mi)	15 Jul 1416	Visayas	NIR	19	13	662
PH-NER	Negros Oriental	(Negros Oriental)	Dumaguete	1.32%	1,492,038	5,385.53 km^{2} (2,079.36 sq mi)	277/km^{2} (718/sq mi)	1 Jan 1890	Visayas	NIR	20	6	557
PH-NSA	Northern Samar	(Northern Samar)	Catarman	0.57%	645,789	3,692.93 km^{2} (1,425.85 sq mi)	175/km^{2} (453/sq mi)	19 Jun 1965	Visayas	VIII	24	—	569
PH-NUE	Nueva Ecija	(Nueva Ecija)	Palayan (Note: The provincial government still uses and maintains facilities in the former capital, Cabanatuan.)	2.13%	2,395,816	5,751.33 km^{2} (2,220.60 sq mi)	417/km^{2} (1,079/sq mi)	25 Apr 1801	Luzon	III	27	5	849
PH-NUV	Nueva Vizcaya	(Nueva Vizcaya)	Bayombong	0.47%	530,106	3,975.67 km^{2} (1,535.01 sq mi)	133/km^{2} (345/sq mi)	24 May 1839	Luzon	II	15	—	275
PH-MDC	Occidental Mindoro	(Occidental Mindoro)	Mamburao	0.45%	511,417	5,865.71 km^{2} (2,264.76 sq mi)	87/km^{2} (226/sq mi)	15 Nov 1950	Luzon	Mimaropa	11	—	162
PH-MDR	Oriental Mindoro	(Oriental Mindoro)	Calapan	0.82%	919,504	4,238.38 km^{2} (1,636.45 sq mi)	217/km^{2} (562/sq mi)	1663	Luzon	Mimaropa	14	1	426
PH-PLW	Palawan (Note: Figures include the independent city of Puerto Princesa.)	(Palawan)	Puerto Princesa	1.14%	1,285,179	17,030.75 km^{2} (6,575.61 sq mi)	75/km^{2} (195/sq mi)	23 Jan 1902	Luzon	Mimaropa	23	1	433
PH-PAM	Pampanga (Note: Figures include the independent city of Angeles.)	(Pampanga)	San Fernando	2.72%	3,069,898	2,062.47 km^{2} (796.32 sq mi)	1,488/km^{2} (3,855/sq mi)	4 Sep 1408	Luzon	III	19	3	538
PH-PAN	Pangasinan (Note: Figures include the independent city of Dagupan.)	(Pangasinan)	Lingayen	2.83%	3,188,540	5,451.01 km^{2} (2,104.65 sq mi)	585/km^{2} (1,515/sq mi)	5 Apr 1580	Luzon	I	44	4	1,364
PH-QUE	Quezon (Note: Figures include the independent city of Lucena.)	(Quezon)	Lucena	2.01%	2,260,669	9,069.60 km^{2} (3,501.79 sq mi)	249/km^{2} (646/sq mi)	1591	Luzon	IV-A	39	2	1,242
PH-QUI	Quirino	(Quirino)	Cabarroguis	0.19%	210,841	2,323.47 km^{2} (897.10 sq mi)	91/km^{2} (235/sq mi)	18 Jun 1966	Luzon	II	6	—	132
PH-RIZ	Rizal	(Rizal (province))	Antipolo	3.03%	3,416,541	1,191.94 km^{2} (460.21 sq mi)	2,866/km^{2} (7,424/sq mi)	23 Feb 1853	Luzon	IV-A	13	1	189
PH-ROM	Romblon	(Romblon)	Romblon	0.28%	308,985	1,533.45 km^{2} (592.07 sq mi)	201/km^{2} (522/sq mi)	16 Mar 1901	Luzon	Mimaropa	17	—	219
PH-WSA	Samar	(Samar (province))	Catbalogan	0.73%	793,183	6,048.03 km^{2} (2,335.16 sq mi)	131/km^{2} (340/sq mi)	4 Feb 1792	Visayas	VIII	24	2	951
PH-SAR	Sarangani	(Sarangani)	Alabel	0.51%	558,946	3,601.25 km^{2} (1,390.45 sq mi)	155/km^{2} (402/sq mi)	16 Mar 1992	Mindanao	XII	7	—	141
PH-SIG	Siquijor	(Siquijor)	Siquijor	0.09%	103,395	337.49 km^{2} (130.31 sq mi)	306/km^{2} (793/sq mi)	17 Sep 1971	Visayas	NIR	6	—	134
PH-SOR	Sorsogon	(Sorsogon)	Sorsogon City	0.76%	828,655	2,119.01 km^{2} (818.15 sq mi)	391/km^{2} (1,013/sq mi)	17 Oct 1894	Luzon	V	14	1	541
PH-SCO	South Cotabato (Note: Figures include the independent city of General Santos.)	(South Cotabato)	Koronadal	1.53%	1,672,791	4,428.81 km^{2} (1,709.97 sq mi)	378/km^{2} (978/sq mi)	18 Jun 1966	Mindanao	XII	10	2	225
PH-SLE	Southern Leyte	(Southern Leyte)	Maasin	0.39%	429,573	1,798.61 km^{2} (694.45 sq mi)	239/km^{2} (619/sq mi)	22 May 1959	Visayas	VIII	18	1	500
PH-SUK	Sultan Kudarat	(Sultan Kudarat)	Isulan	0.78%	854,052	5,298.34 km^{2} (2,045.70 sq mi)	161/km^{2} (417/sq mi)	22 Nov 1973	Mindanao	XII	11	1	249
PH-SLU	Sulu	(Sulu)	Jolo	0.92%	1,000,108	1,600.40 km^{2} (617.92 sq mi)	625/km^{2} (1,619/sq mi)	10 Mar 1917	Mindanao	IX	19	—	410
PH-SUN	Surigao del Norte	(Surigao del Norte)	Surigao City	0.49%	534,636	1,972.93 km^{2} (761.75 sq mi)	271/km^{2} (702/sq mi)	15 May 1901	Mindanao	XIII	20	1	335
PH-SUR	Surigao del Sur	(Surigao del Sur)	Tandag	0.59%	642,255	4,932.70 km^{2} (1,904.53 sq mi)	130/km^{2} (337/sq mi)	16 Jun 1960	Mindanao	XIII	17	2	309
PH-TAR	Tarlac	(Tarlac)	Tarlac City	1.38%	1,503,456	3,053.60 km^{2} (1,179.00 sq mi)	492/km^{2} (1,275/sq mi)	28 Mar 1872	Luzon	III	17	1	511
PH-TAW	Tawi-Tawi	(Tawi-Tawi)	Bongao	0.40%	440,276	1,087.40 km^{2} (419.85 sq mi)	405/km^{2} (1,049/sq mi)	11 Sep 1973	Mindanao	BARMM	11	—	203
PH-ZMB	Zambales (Note: Figures include the independent city of Olongapo.)	(Zambales)	Iba	0.83%	909,932	3,830.83 km^{2} (1,479.09 sq mi)	238/km^{2} (615/sq mi)	1578	Luzon	III	13	1	247
PH-ZAN	Zamboanga del Norte	(Zamboanga del Norte)	Dipolog	0.96%	1,047,455	7,301.00 km^{2} (2,818.93 sq mi)	143/km^{2} (372/sq mi)	6 Jun 1952	Mindanao	IX	25	2	691
PH-ZAS	Zamboanga del Sur (Note: Figures include the independent city of Zamboanga.)	(Zamboanga del Sur)	Pagadian	1.86%	2,027,902	5,914.16 km^{2} (2,283.47 sq mi)	343/km^{2} (888/sq mi)	1 Sep 1914	Mindanao	IX	26	2	779
PH-ZSI	Zamboanga Sibugay	(Zamboanga Sibugay)	Ipil	0.61%	669,840	3,607.75 km^{2} (1,392.96 sq mi)	186/km^{2} (481/sq mi)	22 Feb 2001	Mindanao	IX	16	—	389
PH-00	Metro Manila		Manila ^{†}	12.42%	14,001,751	636.00 km^{2} (245.56 sq mi)	22,015/km^{2} (57,019/sq mi)	—	Luzon	NCR (Note: Metro Manila is included for comparison, although it is not a province but an administrative region.)	1	16	1,706
	Special Geographic Area			0.19%	214,703	824.31 km^{2} (318.27 sq mi)	260/km^{2} (675/sq mi)	—		(Note: Special Geographic Area is included because the 2024 Philippine Census designate it as separate from Cotabato and it has its own authority, although it is not a province or a city.)	1	8	63
=== Former provinces ===
- Manila (until 1901) – Incorporated into Rizal; portions around Manila later consolidated to form present-day NCR.
- Lepanto-Bontoc (1902–1908) – Incorporated into Mountain Province.
- Moro Province (1903–1913) – Converted to the Department of Mindanao and Sulu, composed of seven provinces. Now part of several regions in Mindanao.
- Ambos Camarines (1901–1908) – Divided into Camarines Norte and Camarines Sur, although the wording of Act No. 2809 implies Camarines Norte was created from Ambos Camarines, the remainder of which was renamed Camarines Sur. Camarines Sur retained the provincial capital of Nueva Caceres.
- Misamis (1901–1939) – Partitioned into Misamis Occidental and Misamis Oriental. Misamis Oriental retained the provincial capital of Cagayan.
- Mindoro (1902–1950) – Divided into Occidental Mindoro and Oriental Mindoro. Oriental Mindoro retained the provincial capital of Calapan.
- Zamboanga (1914–1952) – Partitioned into Zamboanga del Norte and Zamboanga del Sur. The de jure provincial capital of Molave was placed under the jurisdiction of Zamboanga del Sur which had its capital in Pagadian. Zamboanga Sibugay later created from Zamboanga del Sur.
- Lanao (1914–1959) – Divided into Lanao del Norte and Lanao del Sur. Lanao del Sur retained the provincial capital of Dansalan (now Marawi).
- Surigao (1901–1967) – Partitioned into Surigao del Norte and Surigao del Sur. Surigao del Norte retained the provincial capital of Surigao City and the provincial seal. The province of Dinagat Islands was later created from Surigao del Norte.
- Davao (1914–1967; 1972–1998) – Divided into Davao del Norte, Davao del Sur and Davao Oriental. Davao del Norte was officially known as Davao from 1972 to 1998, when Compostela Valley (now Davao de Oro) was later created from Davao province. Davao Occidental later created from Davao del Sur.
- Agusan (1907–1967) – Partitioned into Agusan del Norte and Agusan del Sur. Agusan del Norte retained the former provincial capital of Butuan. The provincial capital was officially transferred to Cabadbaran in 2000 but the provincial government services and functions are yet to be completely transferred to the new capital.
- Negros del Norte (1985–1986) – Batas Pambansa Blg. 885, which created a new province out of the northern part of Negros Occidental, took effect on December 23, 1985, with a plebiscite to ratify the law held on January 3, 1986. The province comprised the present-day cities of Cadiz (which was to serve as the capital), Escalante, Sagay, San Carlos, Silay and Victorias, as well as the municipalities of Calatrava, Don Salvador Benedicto, Enrique B. Magalona, Manapla, and Toboso. Despite voters ratifying Batas Pambansa Blg. 885, on July 11, 1986, the Supreme Court declared the law and the proclamation of the province null and void. The ruling states the enabling law was unconstitutional for, among other things, not including the rest of Negros Occidental in the plebiscite, and the proposed province not meeting the 3,500 square kilometer land area requirement of the 1983 Local Government Code.
- Kalinga-Apayao (1966–1995) – Divided into Apayao and Kalinga. Kalinga retained the provincial capital of Tabuk.
- Shariff Kabunsuan (2006–2008) – Republic Act No. 9054 conferred to the Autonomous Region in Muslim Mindanao expanded powers, especially the capacity to create provinces (Article VI, Section 19). Based on this, the ARMM Regional Legislative Assembly enacted Muslim Mindanao Autonomy Act No. 201 on August 28, 2006. The Act created a new province, comprising all the municipalities in the first congressional district of Maguindanao (except Cotabato City), with its capital at Datu Odin Sinsuat. The province's creation was approved on October 28, 2006, by a majority vote in a plebiscite. Responding to requests for clarification as to which congressional districts form Shariff Kabunsuan for the 2007 elections (specifically whether Cotabato City was part of the representation of the new province), COMELEC issued Resolution No. 7845, which initially held Cotabato City to be the sole remaining LGU in the First District of Maguindanao. COMELEC later amended this with Resolution No. 7902, which maintained the status quo before the province's creation. The COMELEC resolutions became the subject of a case in which the Supreme Court opined that because "the power to create new a province or city inherently involves the power to create a legislative district"—a power that Congress did not explicitly delegate to the ARMM Regional Assembly—the creation of a province by a lower legislative body (the ARMM Regional Assembly) will necessarily entail the creation of a legislative district for a higher legislative body (Congress). Therefore, on July 16, 2008, the Supreme Court declared Section 19, Article VI of RA No. 9054 unconstitutional, MMA Act No. 201 void, and COMELEC Resolution No. 7902 valid.
- Maguindanao (1973–2022) – Republic Act No. 11550 divided the province into Maguindanao del Norte and Maguindanao del Sur through a plebiscite. Maguindanao del Norte resembles the former province of Shariff Kabunsuan however adds the municipality of Sultan Sumagka into its territory. The capital of Maguindanao del Norte is Datu Odin Sinsuat while the capital of Maguindanao del Sur is Buluan.

== History ==
=== Timeline ===
The Revolutionary Government of the Philippines and later the First Philippine Republic continued the original Spanish divisions, establishing civil government on the provincial as well as municipal scale in areas liberated from Spanish sovereignty. The United States, asserting ownership over the Philippines, divided the islands into four gobiernos (governments), which were further subdivided into provinces and districts. The American administration likewise inherited the Spanish divisions and placed them under military government. Civil government instituted under Filipino authority was gradually replaced with American civil government as towns fell to the Americans during the Philippine–American War.

1900–1901

- November 23, 1900 – Civil government of the province of Benguet established through Act No. 49. Capital moved to Baguio.
- February 6, 1901 – Act No. 83, or the Provincial Government Act, enacted by the Philippine Commission.
- February 13 – Provisions of the Provincial Government Act extended to Pampanga through Act No. 85.
- February 16 – Provisions of the Provincial Government Act extended to Pangasinan through Act No. 86. Towns of Balungao, Rosales, San Quintin and Umingan annexed from Nueva Ecija.
- February 18 – Provisions of the Provincial Government Act extended to Tarlac through Act No. 87.
- February 27 – Provisions of the Provincial Government Act extended to Bulacan through Act No. 88. Capital moved to Malolos.
- March 2 – Provisions of the Provincial Government Act extended to Bataan through Act No. 92.
- March 12 – Provisions of the Provincial Government Act extended to Tayabas through Act No. 103. Capital moved to Lucena.
- March 16 – Provisions of the Provincial Government Act extended to Romblon, elevated from Spanish-era status of District, through Act No. 104.
- March 18 – Provisions of the Provincial Government Act extended to Masbate, elevated from Spanish-era status of District, through Act No. 105.
- April 11 – Provisions of the Provincial Government Act extended to Iloilo, formed through the merging of the Spanish-era Province of Iloilo with the Comandancia of Concepcion, through Act No. 113.
- April 13 – Provisions of the Provincial Government Act extended to Antique through Act No. 114.
- April 15 – Provisions of the Provincial Government Act extended to Capiz through Act No. 115.
- April 18 – Provisions of the Provincial Government Act extended to Cebu through Act No. 116.
- April 20 – Provisions of the Provincial Government Act extended to Bohol through Act No. 117.
- April 22 – Provisions of the Provincial Government Act extended to Leyte through Act No. 121.
- April 26 – Provisions of the Provincial Government Act extended to Albay through Act No. 122.
- April 27 – Provisions of the Provincial Government Act extended to Ambos Camarines through Act No. 123.
- April 30 – Provisions of the Provincial Government Act extended to Sorsogon through Act No. 124.
- May 1:
  - Provisions of the Provincial Government Act extended to Occidental Negros and Oriental Negros through Acts No. 119 and 120, respectively, enacted on April 20, 1901.
  - Provisions of the Provincial Government Act extended to newly created Marinduque through Act No. 125.
- May 2 – Provisions of the Provincial Government Act extended to Batangas through Act No. 126.
- May 15:
  - Provisions of the Provincial Government Act extended to Surigao, elevated from Spanish-era status of District, through Act No. 127.
  - Provisions of the Provincial Government Act extended to Misamis through Act No. 128.
- June 11:
  - Provisions of the Provincial Government Act extended to newly created Rizal, formed through the merging of the Politico-Military District of Morong with the entire province of Manila except the territory of the city of Manila, through Act No. 137.
  - Provisions of the Provincial Government Act extended to Cavite through Act No. 138. Annexed Lubang and adjacent islands to the province. Provincial government provided an option to move capital from the town of Cavite.
  - Provisions of the Provincial Government Act extended to Nueva Ecija through Act No. 139. Provincial government provided an option to move capital from the town of San Isidro.
- July 16 – Catanduanes annexed to Albay through Act No. 169.
- July 17 – Batangas, Bohol and Cebu placed under the control of military governors through Act No. 173.
- August 15 – Provisions of the Provincial Government Act and its amendments extended to La Union through Act No. 203.
- August 16 – Provisions of the Provincial Government Act and its amendments extended to Ilocos Sur through Act No. 205.
- August 19 – Provisions of the Provincial Government Act and its amendments extended to Abra, excluding its territory east of the crest of the Cordillera Central, through Act No. 206.
- August 20 – Provisions of the Provincial Government Act and its amendments extended to Ilocos Norte through Act No. 207.
- August 22 – Provisions of the Provincial Government Act and its amendments extended to Cagayan through Act No. 209. The Babuyan Islands and the Spanish-era province of Batanes annexed to the province.
- August 24 – Provisions of the Provincial Government Act and its amendments extended to Isabela through Act No. 210.
- August 28 – Provisions of the Provincial Government Act and its amendments extended to Zambales through Act No. 211.

1902

- January 1 – Civil government of the Province of Cebu restored through Act No. 322 enacted on December 20, 1901.
- January 28 – Civil government of the Province of Nueva Vizcaya established through Act No. 337.
- April 1 – Civil government of the Province of Bohol restored through Act No. 365 enacted on March 3, 1902.
- May 28 – Spanish-era comandancias of Amburayan, Bontoc and Lepanto organized into sub-provinces under the new province of Lepanto-Bontoc through Act No. 410. Areas between Abra and Cagayan not yet placed under the jurisdiction of any province annexed as part of the sub-province of Bontoc.
- June 12 – Spanish-era districts of El Principe and Infanta, including the Polillo Islands, annexed to Tayabas through Act No. 417.
- June 17 – Provisions of the Provincial Government Act and its amendments extended to Samar through Act No. 419.
- June 23:
  - Civil government of the Province of Paragua established through Act No. 422.
  - Mindoro, Lubang and surrounding small islands annexed to Marinduque through Act No. 423.
- July 1 – Provisions of the Provincial Government Act and its amendments extended to La Laguna through Act No. 424.
- November 10:
  - Marinduque annexed to Tayabas through Act No. 499.
  - Provisions of the Provincial Government Act and its amendments extended to newly created Mindoro, separated from Marinduque through Act No. 500.

1903

- May 14 – Cagayancillo, Balabac and the rest of Palawan Island (south of Tapul and Ulugan rivers) annexed to Paragua through Act No. 747. Provincial government provided the option to choose capital between Cuyo or Puerto Princesa.
- May 26 – Spanish-era Comandancia of Kayapa annexed to Benguet through Act No. 768.
- July 15 – Moro Province formed, composed of the districts of Cotabato, Davao, Lanao, Sulu, and Zamboanga through Act No. 787 enacted on June 1, 1903.

1905

- April 1 – Abra annexed to Ilocos Sur as sub-province through Act No. 1306 enacted on February 27, 1905.
- April 19 – Catanduanes established as sub-province of Albay through Act No. 1331.
- June 28 – Name of Paragua changed to Palawan through Act No. 1363.

1906–1907

- January 1, 1906 – Masbate annexed to Sorsogon as sub-province through Act No. 1413 enacted on November 23, 1905.
- May 9, 1907 – Apayao and Kalinga established as sub-provinces of Cagayan and Lepanto-Bontoc, respectively, through Act No. 1642.
- July 15 – Romblon (except the island of Maestro de Campo, annexed to Mindoro) annexed to Capiz as sub-province through Act No. 1665 enacted on July 2, 1907.
- August 10 – Marinduque declared a sub-province of Tayabas through Act No. 1649 enacted on May 17, 1907.
- August 20 – Act No. 1693 creates Agusan (composed of the sub-provinces of Butuan and Bukidnon), and establishes Batanes as a sub-province of Cagayan.
- October 8 – Siquijor established as sub-province of Negros Oriental through Act No. 1753.

1908–1919

- August 18, 1908 – Mountain Province, with seven sub-provinces, formed by merging territories of the entire province of Lepanto-Bontoc (with Amburayan, Bontoc, Kalinga and Lepanto sub-provinces); the district in the province of Nueva Vizcaya that formerly comprised the Spanish-era Comandancia of Quiangan (annexed as Ifugao sub-province); the entire province of Benguet except Baguio (annexed as Benguet sub-province); and Apayao sub-province in Cagayan, through Act No. 1876.
- May 20, 1909 – Batanes re-established as province, separated from Cagayan through Act No. 1952.
- December 20, 1913 – Act No. 2309 renames Moro Province to Department of Mindanao and Sulu and annexes Agusan (with Bukidnon sub-province) to the Department. Department of Mindanao and Sulu formally organized on January 1, 1914.
- September 1, 1914 – Department of Mindanao and Sulu provided with autonomous government through Act No. 2408 enacted on July 23, 1914. Bukidnon sub-province and the former Moro Province districts of Cotabato, Davao, Lanao, Sulu and Zamboanga converted to provinces.
- March 9, 1917 – Abra re-established as regular province, separated from Ilocos Sur through Act No. 2683.
- December 7, 1917 – Romblon re-established as regular province, separated from Capiz through Act No. 2724.
- March 3, 1919 – Ambos Camarines divided into Camarines Norte and Camarines Sur through Act No. 2809.

1920

- February 4
  - Act No. 2877 abolishes Amburayan sub-province in Mountain Province by annexing its municipal entities to Ilocos Sur and La Union.
  - Lepanto sub-province reduced in size by annexing some of its municipal entities to Ilocos Sur and Benguet.
- February 22 – Marinduque re-established as regular province, separated from Tayabas through Act No. 2880.
- December 15 – Masbate re-established as regular province, separated from Sorsogon through Act No. 2934.

1923–1939

- March 27, 1923 – Leyte divided into Occidental Leyte and Oriental Leyte through Act No. 3117, but never proclaimed by the governor-general.
- November 28, 1930 – Division of Misamis into Misamis Occidental and Misamis Oriental implemented by virtue of Act No. 3777, the law that amended Act No. 3537 (enacted on November 2, 1929), which first sought the division.
- June 8, 1940 – Provincial government of Romblon abolished, municipal governments reorganized into four "special municipalities" through Commonwealth Act No. 581.

1942

- January 1 – Executive Order No. 400 issued by Manuel L. Quezon creates the City of Greater Manila, composed of the chartered cities of Manila and Quezon City with the following municipalities from the province of Rizal: Caloocan, Makati, Mandaluyong, Parañaque, Pasay and San Juan.
- May 18 – Executive Order No. 42 issued by Jorge Vargas of the Japanese-era Philippine Executive Commission abolishes sub-provinces, annexing their municipalities to their respective provinces. (Note: Provisions of this order only apply for the duration of the Japanese occupation; revoked after the restoration of the Commonwealth in 1945.) (Note: SEC. 2. Subprovinces abolished.—The subprovinces and their governments are hereby abolished and their territories annexed to the provinces to which they belong.")
- August 31 – Executive Order No. 84 issued by Jorge Vargas abolishes the province of Batanes and annexes its municipalities to Cagayan; annexes the municipalities of Baler and Casiguran (corresponding to the entire present-day territory of Aurora) from Tayabas to Nueva Ecija; annexes the municipality of Infanta (including the present-day municipalities of General Nakar and Real) from Tayabas to Laguna; abolishes the province of Marinduque and annexes its municipalities to Tayabas; and abolishes the province of Romblon and annexes its special municipalities to Capiz. (Note: "Pursuant to the authority conferred upon me as Head of the Central Administrative Organization by Order No. 1 in connection with Order No. 3 of the Commander in Chief of the Imperial Japanese Forces in the Philippines and upon the recommendation of the Executive Commission it is hereby ordered that—: 1. The Province of Batanes is abolished and the comprising the same as well as the territory thereof shall be annexed to the Province Cagayan.; 2. The municipalities of Baler and Casiguran, Province of Tayabas, and the territories thereof are segregated from said province and shall be annexed to the Province of Nueva Ecija.; 3. The municipality of Infanta, Province of Tayabas, and the territory thereof are segregated from province and shall be annexed to the Province of Laguna.; 4. The Province of Marinduque is abolished and municipalities comprising the same as well as territory thereof shall be annexed to the Province of Tayabas.; 5. The Province of Romblon is abolished and the municipalities comprising the same as well the territory thereof shall be annexed to the of Capiz.")
- November 1 – Executive Order No. 103 issued by Jorge Vargas annexes the Polillo Islands from Tayabas to Laguna. (Note: "Pursuant to the authority conferred upon me by Order No. 1 in connection with Order No. 3 of the Commander in Chief of the Imperial Japanese Forces in the Philippines and upon the recommendation of the Executive Commission it is hereby ordered that—: 1. The Polillo islands are segregated from the Province of Tayabas and shall be annexed to the Province of Laguna.")

1945–1956

- August 1, 1945 – Executive Order No. 58 issued by Sergio Osmeña reduces the territory of the City of Greater Manila to only Manila and Quezon City, restoring Caloocan, Makati, Mandaluyong, Parañaque, Pasay and San Juan to Rizal. Republic Act No. 54 of October 10, 1946, later repealed Executive Order No. 400 (series 1942) and Executive Order No. 58 (series 1945), finally abolishing the City of Greater Manila and restoring the pre-war status of the chartered cities of Manila and Quezon City.
- October 26, 1945 – Catanduanes established as regular province, separated from Albay through Commonwealth Act No. 687 enacted on September 26, 1945.
- September 7, 1946 – Name of Tayabas changed to Quezon through Republic Act No. 14.
- October 1, 1946 – CA 581 repealed and Romblon's provincial and municipal governments restored through Republic Act No. 38.
- June 13, 1950 – Mindoro divided into Occidental Mindoro and Oriental Mindoro through Republic Act No. 505.
- June 14, 1951 – Aurora established as sub-province of Quezon through Republic Act No. 648.
- June 6, 1952 – Zamboanga divided into Zamboanga del Norte and Zamboanga del Sur through Republic Act No. 711.
- April 25, 1956 – Aklan separated from Capiz through Republic Act No. 1414.
- June 22, 1957 – Camiguin established as sub-province of Misamis Oriental through Republic Act No. 2021.

1959

- April 8 – Biliran established as sub-province of Leyte through Republic Act No. 2141.
- May 22 – Lanao province divided into Lanao del Norte and Lanao del Sur through Republic Act No. 2228.
- July 1 – Southern Leyte separated from Leyte through Republic Act No. 2227 approved on May 22, 1959.

1960–1969

- June 19, 1960 – Surigao divided into Surigao del Norte and Surigao del Sur through Republic Act No. 2786.
- November 9, 1965 – Plebiscite approves the division of Samar into Eastern Samar, Northern Samar, and Western Samar by virtue of Republic Act No. 4221 enacted on June 19, 1965.
- June 18, 1966
  - Guimaras established as sub-province of Iloilo through Republic Act No. 4667.
  - Camiguin established as regular province, separated from Misamis Oriental through Republic Act No. 4669.
  - Benguet re-established, and Ifugao and Kalinga-Apayao created, from Mountain Province through Republic Act No. 4695.
  - Quirino established as sub-province of Nueva Vizcaya through Republic Act No. 4734.
  - South Cotabato separated from Cotabato through Republic Act No. 4849.
- May 8, 1967 – Davao province divided into Davao del Norte, Davao del Sur, and Davao Oriental through Republic Act No. 4867.
- November 14, 1967 – Plebiscite approves the division of Agusan into Agusan del Norte and Agusan del Sur by virtue of Republic Act No. 4979 enacted on June 17, 1967.
- June 21, 1969 – Name of Western Samar province changed to Samar through Republic Act No. 5650.
- August 4, 1969 – Samal sub-province created from Davao del Norte through Republic Act No. 5999, but never inaugurated.

1971–1998

- October 4, 1971 – Maranaw province created from Lanao del Sur through Republic Act No. 6406, remained unorganized due to the disruption caused by the declaration of Martial Law in the Philippines.
- November 11, 1971 – Plebiscites approve the establishment of Quirino and Siquijor as regular provinces by virtue of Republic Act No. 6394 (approved on September 10, 1971) and Republic Act No. 6398 (approved on September 17, 1971), separating them from Nueva Vizcaya and Negros Oriental, respectively.
- June 17, 1972 – Name of Davao del Norte changed to Davao through Republic Act No. 6430.
- September 11, 1973 – Tawi-Tawi separated from Sulu through Presidential Decree No. 302.
- November 22, 1973 – Cotabato divided into Maguindanao, North Cotabato, and Sultan Kudarat through Presidential Decree No. 341.
- December 27, 1973 – Basilan province created through Presidential Decree No. 356 out of most of the territory of the City of Basilan, which itself was delimited to only the downtown area of what is now Isabela City, then finally abolished by Presidential Decree No. 840 in 1975.
- November 7, 1975 – Metro Manila established through Presidential Decree No. 824, composed of the four chartered cities of Manila, Caloocan, Pasay and Quezon City, and several municipalities of Rizal and Bulacan, all of which effectively became independent from provincial supervision.
- August 13, 1979 – Aurora proclaimed a regular province, separated from Quezon through Batas Pambansa Blg. 7 enacted on November 21, 1978. Plebiscite held on May 20, 1979, approves provincehood.
- March 7, 1984 – Name of North Cotabato province changed to Cotabato through Batas Pambansa Blg. 660.
- January 3, 1986 – Plebiscite approves the separation of Negros del Norte from Negros Occidental by virtue of Batas Pambansa Blg. 885 enacted on December 3, 1985.
- August 18, 1986 – BP No. 885 found unconstitutional by the Supreme Court, Negros del Norte reverts as part of Negros Occidental.
- May 11, 1992 – Plebiscites affirm the establishment of Biliran and Guimaras as regular provinces, separating them from Leyte and Iloilo, respectively, by virtue of Section 462 of Republic Act No. 7160 (Local Government Code of 1991) approved on October 10, 1991.
- May 19, 1992 – Plebiscite approves the separation of Sarangani from South Cotabato by virtue of Republic Act No. 7228 approved on March 16, 1992.
- May 8, 1995 – Plebiscite approves the division of Kalinga-Apayao into Apayao and Kalinga by virtue of Republic Act No. 7878 approved on February 14, 1995.
- March 7, 1998 – Plebiscite approves the separation of Compostela Valley from Davao by virtue of Republic Act No. 8470 approved on January 30, 1998. Name of Davao changed back to Davao del Norte.

2001–present

- February 22, 2001 – Plebiscite approves the separation of Zamboanga Sibugay from Zamboanga del Sur by virtue of Republic Act No. 8973 approved on November 7, 2000.
- October 28, 2006 – Plebiscite approves the separation of Shariff Kabunsuan from Maguindanao by virtue of Muslim Mindanao Autonomy Act No. 201 enacted on August 28, 2006.
- December 2, 2006 – Plebiscite approves the separation of Dinagat Islands from Surigao del Norte by virtue of Republic Act No. 9355 approved on October 2, 2006.
- November 18, 2008 – MMA Act No. 201 declared void by the Supreme Court, Shariff Kabunsuan reverts as part of Maguindanao.
- February 11, 2010 – RA No. 9355 found unconstitutional by the Supreme Court, Dinagat Islands reverts as part of Surigao del Norte.
- March 30, 2011 – Supreme Court reverses its decision on Dinagat Islands and became a province once again.
- October 28, 2013 – Plebiscite approves the separation of Davao Occidental from Davao del Sur by virtue of Republic Act No. 10360 approved on January 21, 2013.
- December 8, 2019 – Name of Compostela Valley changed to Davao de Oro through Republic Act 11297 approved on April 17, 2019.
- September 18, 2022 – Plebiscite approves the division of Maguindanao into Maguindanao del Norte and Maguindanao del Sur by virtue of Republic Act No. 11550 approved on May 27, 2021.

=== Gallery ===
1880

1899

1907

1918

1935

1942–1945

1986

2013–2022

2022–

== Formally proposed/renamed provinces ==
=== Proposed provinces with enacted law ===
Map of the Philippines showing the proposed provinces

- Occidental Leyte and Oriental Leyte (1923) – Leyte was divided into two new provinces by Act No. 3117 on March 27, 1923. The division never took place, however, as no proclamation was issued by the Governor-General.
  - The province of Oriental Leyte would have covered the present-day territories of the entire province of Biliran, the municipalities of Abuyog, Alangalang, Babatngon, Barugo, Burauen, Calubian, Capoocan, Carigara, Dagami, Dulag, Jaro, Javier, Julita, La Paz, Leyte, MacArthur, Mahaplag, Mayorga, Palo, Pastrana, San Isidro, San Miguel, Santa Fe, Tabango, Tabontabon, Tanauan, Tolosa, Tunga and Tacloban (which was designated as the provincial capital).
  - The province of Occidental Leyte would have covered the present-day territories of the entire province of Southern Leyte, the municipalities of Albuera, Bato, Hilongos, Hindang, Inopacan, Isabel, Kananga, Matag-ob, Matalom, Mérida, Palompon, Villaba and the cities of Baybay and Ormoc. The province capital of Occidental Leyte "SEC. 2. ... shall be designated by the Governor-General, until determined by a plurality vote of the electors of the new province at the next general election."
- Samal (1969) – The sub-province of Samal was created by Republic Act No. 5999 and covered the area of the present-day Island Garden City of Samal. However, the sub-province was never inaugurated.
- Maranaw (1971) – Republic Act No. 6406, which sought to create a new province out of eastern Lanao del Sur (now corresponding to the province's first congressional district), was approved on October 4, 1971. The province was to consist of the municipalities of Bubong, Ditsaan-Ramain (including what is now Buadiposo-Buntong), Kapai, Lumba-Bayabao (including what is now Maguing), Marantao, Masiu, Mulondo, Saguiaran, Piagapo, Poona Bayabao, Tamparan, Taraka and Wao (including what is now Bumbaran), with the chartered city of Marawi serving as the new province's capital. Lanao del Sur was to retain the remaining municipalities, with Malabang serving as its new capital. Section 4 of RA 6406 provided that "The new provinces as provided in this Act shall come into existence upon the election and qualification of their first elective provincial officials, who shall be elected in a special election simultaneously with the general elections of November, nineteen hundred and seventy-three." The division never took place due to the declaration of martial law in the Philippines on September 21, 1972, which disrupted the scheduled general elections for 1973 and paved the way for the adoption of a new Constitution and the establishment of the Fourth Philippine Republic. A legacy of this unimplemented division is the existence of two ZIP code series for Lanao del Sur: the 93- series was retained by what were to be the remaining towns of the province (with Malabang, the new capital, being reassigned the code 9300), while a new series (97-) was assigned to what was supposed to be the province of Maranaw (with Marawi getting the new code 9700).

==== Rejected in a plebiscite ====
- Isabela del Norte and Isabela del Sur (1995) – On February 20, 1995, Republic Act No. 7891, which sought to divide the province of Isabela, was approved. Isabela del Norte was to comprise municipalities belonging to the province's first and second congressional districts with Ilagan serving as capital. Isabela del Sur was to consist of the third and fourth congressional districts (excluding the independent component city of Santiago), with Cauayan as the capital. The proposed division was rejected in a plebiscite held on June 20, 1995.
- Quezon del Norte and Quezon del Sur (2007) – The act dividing the province of Quezon into two, Republic Act No. 9495, lapsed into law without the President's signature on September 7, 2007. Quezon del Norte (which would be renamed from Quezon) was to be composed of the first and second congressional districts of the province, with Lucena as its capital. Quezon del Sur, with its capital at Gumaca, would have been composed of the third and fourth congressional districts. The COMELEC held the plebiscite on December 13, 2008, and the majority of the votes rejected the division. Notwithstanding the voters' rejection, all the representatives of Quezon's four legislative districts—Wilfrido Mark Enverga, Irvin Alcala, Danilo Suarez, and Lorenzo Tañada III—reintroduced the measure as House Bill No. 3839 on December 8, 2010. They explained that “the wisdom, logic and bare facts behind what is driving this bill to be filed again in this Congress remain,” citing the persistence of poverty in far-flung coastal municipalities and small islands. Yet, the bill did not make it out of the committee level this time.
- Palawan del Norte, Palawan Oriental, and Palawan del Sur (2021) – On April 5, 2019, President Rodrigo Duterte signed Republic Act No. 11259 that proposed the division the province of Palawan, with the exception of the independent city of Puerto Princesa, into three separate provinces. A plebiscite was originally scheduled for the second Monday of May 2020 but was postponed to March 2021 due to the COVID-19 pandemic. Palawan del Norte would have been composed of Taytay and municipalities north of it. Palawan del Sur would have been composed of the municipalities west and south of Puerto Princesa, including Kalayaan (which administers the country's claims in the Spratly Islands), while the rest were proposed to form Palawan Oriental. The proposed provincial capitals would have been Taytay (Palawan del Norte), Brooke's Point (Palawan del Sur), and Roxas (Palawan Oriental). The COMELEC held the plebiscite on March 13, 2021, and the majority of the votes rejected the division.

=== Currently proposed provinces in the 19th Congress ===
- Kutawato or Moro Province (2024): Senate Bill No. 2875 of Robin Padilla proposes the conversion of the Special Geographic Area of the Bangsamoro autonomous region, which is currently under the jurisdiction of the provincial government of Soccsksargen region's Cotabato province, into a separate province named 'Kutawato'. The bill names as capital the municipality of Pahamuddin, which was created by an act of the Bangsamoro Parliament. Separately, Bangsamoro regional government has been planning to convert the SGA towns into a new province. The Moro Islamic Liberation Front which leads the regional government is already informally referring to the SGA as 'Ligawasan Province'. The regional government has alternatively proposed that the subdivision be named "Moro Province" to avoid confusion with Cotabato province.
- Western Leyte (2005, 2010, 2024, 2025): During the 13th and the 15th Congress, Leyte 5th District Rep. Carmen L. Cari and her son and successor Rep. Jose Carlos L. Cari introduced bills seeking to carve the new province of Western Leyte out of the province of Leyte. The Caris' constituency consisted of the City of Baybay and the eight southernmost municipalities of the province. The bills died in the committee level. Previously, during the 9th Congress, Leyte 4th District Rep. Carmelo J. Locsin filed House Bill No. 6388 also to create the province of Western Leyte; his district consists of the City of Ormoc and the surrounding western municipalities of Albuera, Isabel, Kananga, Matag-ob, Merida, and Palompon. During the 19th congress, Leyte 4th District Rep. Richard Gomez revived the idea through House Bill 11077, seeking to establish Western Leyte as a new province. The proposed province would consist of Cebuano-speaking areas, including Ormoc City as its capital, Baybay City, and the municipalities of Leyte, Calubian, San Isidro, Tabango, Villaba, Albuera, Isabel, Kananga, Matag-ob, Merida, Palompon, Bato, Hilongos, Hindang, Inopacan, and Matalom. This would divide Leyte’s third and fourth congressional districts, covering approximately 3,000 square kilometers with a population nearing 1 million. Gomez cited the geographic division caused by the Leyte Central Highland Range and Mt. Pangasugan, which hinders access to essential services concentrated in Tacloban City on the eastern side of the island. He maintained that creating Western Leyte would address these logistical challenges and improve service delivery for the population on the western side.
- Surigao Oriental (1992, 2015, 2022, 2025): House Bill No. 2336 seeks to carve a province out of the six southernmost local government units of Surigao del Sur province. The City of Bislig and the municipalities of Barobo, Hinatuan, Lingig, and Tagbina all comprise the district of the bill's author, Surigao del Sur 2nd District Representative Johnny T. Pimentel; the bill also seeks to transfer Lianga, currently part of the First District, to the proposed province. Bislig would be the designated capital. The bill is pending with the Committee on Local Government since August 2, 2022. A previous attempt to create the province of Surigao del Oriente, which would have covered the 2nd District municipalities but would have excluded Lianga, died in the committee level during the 16th Congress. The proposal to create a province called Surigao Oriental was raised as early as 1992 by then-2nd District Representative Ernesto T. Estrella.
- Zamboanga Occidental (2002, 2007, 2010, 2017, 2023, 2025) – On September 25, 2023, Zamboanga del Norte 3rd District Representative Adrian Michael A. Amatong filed House Bill No. 9311 seeking to create a new province out of his constituency. The proposed province would consist of the 12 westernmost municipalities of Zamboanga del Norte—Liloy as the proposed capital, together with Baliguian, Godod, Gutalac, Kalawit, Leon B. Postigo, Salug, Sibuco, Siocon, Sirawai, and Tampilisan. Previous attempts to turn the district into the province of Zamboanga Occidental, the province of Liloy, or the province of Zamboanga Hermosa—which began with the efforts of then-2nd District Representative Ernesto T. Estrella as early as 1992—failed to hurdle the 12th, the 14th, the 15th, the 17th and the 19th Congress and later it passed in the 20th congress.

=== Other proposed provinces ===
- Mindoro del Sur (1998): During the 11th Congress, Oriental Mindoro 1st District Rep. Renato Leviste filed House Bill No. 1476 proposing to turn the adjoining 2nd District into its own province called Mindoro del Sur. The proposed province would have consisted of the seven municipalities forming the southern half of Oriental Mindoro: Bansud, Bongabong, Bulalacao, Gloria, Mansalay, Pinamalayan, and Roxas. However, the measure did not take off. The Sangguniang Panlalawigan in 2002 passed a resolution urging the province's two representatives, Charity Leviste and Alfonso Umali, Jr., to refile the bill in the 12th Congress, but to no avail.
- Panguil Bay (1999): During the 11th Congress, Lanao del Norte 1st District Rep. Alipio Cirilo Badelles filed House Bill No. 8049 to carve the province of Panguil Bay out of Lanao del Norte. The bill died in the committee level.
- Bukidnon del Sur (2004): In November 2004, during the 13th Congress, Bukidnon 3rd District Rep. Juan Miguel F. Zubiri filed a bill seeking to carve the new province of Bukidnon del Sur out of the province of Bukidnon. The proposed province would have been composed of 10 southwestern and southern municipalities: Damulog, Dangcagan, Don Carlos, Kadingilan, Kalilangan, Kibawe, Kitaotao, Maramag, Pangantucan, and Quezon. The capital would have been determined by way of plebiscite had the bill passed into law. House Bill No. 4834 was unanimously approved on third reading by the House of Representatives on November 21, 2005, but it never moved past the committee level at the Senate.
- Cebu del Norte, Cebu del Sur, and Occidental Cebu (2005): During the 13th Congress, the province of Cebu grappled with the so-called Sugbuak controversy. Three bills were filed in January and February 2005 by 2nd District Rep. Simeon L. Kintanar, 3rd District Rep. Antonio P. Yapha, Jr., and 4th District Clavel A. Martinez, who sought to turn their respective constituencies into the new provinces of Cebu del Sur, Occidental Cebu, and Cebu del Norte, respectively. The consolidated substitute bill, House Bill No. 5721, was approved by the Committee on Local Government but was not acted upon by the Committee on Rules by the end of the 13th Congress amid strong opposition.
- Misamis North and Misamis South (2005): During the 13th Congress, Misamis Oriental 2nd District Rep. Augusto H. Baculio introduced two bills seeking to carve the provinces of Misamis North and Misamis South out of the province of Misamis Oriental. The bills died in the committee level.
- Northwestern Samar (2008, 2010, 2019, 2026) – Most recently during the 17th Congress, House Bill No. 8824 was introduced in the House of Representatives on January 22, 2019, by 1st District Representative Edgar Mary Sarmiento to turn his constituency into a new province called Northwestern Samar. The proposed province would have consisted of the City of Calbayog as its capital, along with the nine municipalities of Almagro, Gandara, Matuginao, Pagsanghan, San Jorge, Santa Margarita, Santo Niño, Tagapul-an, and Tarangnan. This proposal has repeatedly died in the committee level during the 14th, 15th and 17th Congress and later re-filled again.
- Nueva Camarines (2011, 2025) – On May 24, 2011, during the 15th Congress, Camarines Sur Fourth District Rep. Arnulfo Fuentebella introduced House Bill 4728, which sought to create a new province out of the City of Iriga and 16 municipalities comprising the eastern half and the southern portion of Camarines Sur. This would have included all 10 municipalities of Fuentebella's Fourth District (Caramoan, Garchitorena, Goa, Lagonoy, Presentacion, Sagñay, San Jose, Siruma, Tigaon, and Tinambac) and all six municipalities of the adjacent Fifth District (Baao, Balatan, Bato, Buhi, Bula, and Nabua). Tigaon would have been the capital of the proposed province. Just three months later, on August 3, 2011, the finalized measure numbered House Bill No. 4820 passed the House of Representatives of the Philippines with 229 votes in favor to one against. However, it failed to gain the concurrence of the Senate, which did not take up the controversial bill by the end of 15th Congress, following the opposition of Senators Joker Arroyo, Antonio Trillanes IV, Bongbong Marcos and Manny Villar. In 2015, Rappler reported: “It is widely believed here that the Fuentebellas want a new province they can rule because they had failed to win the governorship of Camarines Sur since former Governor Luis Villafuerte held the position.”

=== Proposed renaming ===
- Southern Leyte to Leyte del Sur (2007) – Southern Leyte Lone District Rep. Roger Mercado introduced bills to rename the province of Southern Leyte to Leyte del Sur, citing a desire to “enhance the identity of [the province] as geographically a part of the Leyte Island with a distinct personality of its own” and to have the province alphabetically listed closer to the neighboring province of Leyte, from which it was separated in 1959. Mercado first filed the bill in 2007, and this attempt gained traction during the 14th Congress, as House Bill No. 6650 was passed by the House of Representatives on September 8, 2009, with 170 votes in its favor and none against it. The Senate, however, did not act on the measure. Mercado's second attempt in 2017 did not prosper, as House Bill No. 1602 died in the committee level during the 17th Congress.

== See also ==
- List of Philippine provinces by population
- List of Philippine provincial etymologies
- List of Philippine provinces by Human Development Index
- List of Philippine provinces by poverty rate
- List of demonyms for Philippine provinces
- ISO 3166-2:PH
- Sub-provinces of the Philippines, a defunct group of administrative divisions in the Philippines
