= ISO 3166-2:PH =

Entry for the Philippines in ISO 3166-2

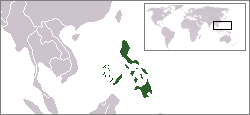
Location of the Philippines.

ISO 3166-2:PH is the entry for the Philippines in ISO 3166-2, part of the ISO 3166 standard published by the International Organization for Standardization (ISO), which defines codes for the names of the principal subdivisions (e.g., provinces or states) of all countries coded in ISO 3166-1.

Currently for the Philippines, ISO 3166-2 codes are defined for two levels of subdivisions:

- 17 regions
- 82 provinces

Each code consists of two parts, separated by a hyphen. The first part is PH, the ISO 3166-1 alpha-2 code of the Philippines. The second part is either of the following:

- two digits: regions
- three letters: provinces

The codes for the regions correspond to the Roman numerals used to represent the regions, except the Autonomous Region in Muslim Mindanao, the Cordillera Administrative Region, Mimaropa, and the National Capital Region, which do not use Roman numerals for representation purposes.

The codes for the provinces of Cotabato (PH-NCO) and Davao de Oro (PH-COM) are assigned based on their former names, North Cotabato and Compostela Valley respectively.

== Current codes ==
Subdivision names are listed as in the ISO 3166-2 standard published by the ISO 3166 Maintenance Agency (ISO 3166/MA).

ISO 639-1 codes are used to represent subdivision names in the following administrative languages:

- (en): English
- (tl): Tagalog

Click on the button in the header to sort each column.

=== Regions ===
Code	Subdivision name (en)	Subdivision name (tl)	Roman numeral or acronym (Note: For reference only; Roman numeral designations and/or acronyms are not included in the ISO 3166-2 standard.)
PH-14	Autonomous Region in Muslim Mindanao (Note: Defunct; superseded by the Bangsamoro Autonomous Region in Muslim Mindanao (BARMM) in 2019.)	Nagsasariling Rehiyon ng Muslim sa Mindanaw	ARMM
PH-05	Bicol	Rehiyon ng Bikol	V
PH-02	Cagayan Valley	Rehiyon ng Lambak ng Kagayan	II
PH-40	Calabarzon	Rehiyon ng Calabarzon	IV-A
PH-13	Caraga	Rehiyon ng Karaga	XIII
PH-03	Central Luzon	Rehiyon ng Gitnang Luson	III
PH-07	Central Visayas	Rehiyon ng Gitnang Bisaya	VII
PH-15	Cordillera Administrative Region	Rehiyon ng Administratibo ng Kordilyera	CAR
PH-11	Davao	Rehiyon ng Dabaw	XI
PH-08	Eastern Visayas	Rehiyon ng Silangang Bisaya	VIII
PH-01	Ilocos	Rehiyon ng Iloko	I
PH-41	Mimaropa	Rehiyon ng Mimaropa	IV-B (Note: Numerical designation was discontinued in 2017.)
PH-00	National Capital Region	Pambansang Punong Rehiyon	NCR
PH-10	Northern Mindanao	Rehiyon ng Hilagang Mindanaw	X
PH-12	Soccsksargen	Rehiyon ng Soccsksargen	XII
PH-06	Western Visayas	Rehiyon ng Kanlurang Bisaya	VI
PH-09	Zamboanga Peninsula	Rehiyon ng Tangway ng Sambuwangga	IX

=== Provinces ===
Code	Subdivision name (en)	Subdivision name (tl)	In region
PH-ABR	Abra	Abra	15
PH-AGN	Agusan del Norte	Hilagang Agusan	13
PH-AGS	Agusan del Sur	Timog Agusan	13
PH-AKL	Aklan	Aklan	06
PH-ALB	Albay	Albay	05
PH-ANT	Antique	Antike	06
PH-APA	Apayao	Apayaw	15
PH-AUR	Aurora	Aurora	03
PH-BAS	Basilan	Basilan	09 (Note: Basilan has been moved from Zamboanga Peninsula to the Autonomous Region in Muslim Mindanao (PH-14).)
PH-BAN	Bataan	Bataan	03
PH-BTN	Batanes	Batanes	02
PH-BTG	Batangas	Batangas	40
PH-BEN	Benguet	Benget	15
PH-BIL	Biliran	Biliran	08
PH-BOH	Bohol	Bohol	07
PH-BUK	Bukidnon	Bukidnon	10
PH-BUL	Bulacan	Bulakan	03
PH-CAG	Cagayan	Kagayan	02
PH-CAN	Camarines Norte	Hilagang Kamarines	05
PH-CAS	Camarines Sur	Timog Kamarines	05
PH-CAM	Camiguin	Kamigin	10
PH-CAP	Capiz	Kapis	06
PH-CAT	Catanduanes	Katanduwanes	05
PH-CAV	Cavite	Kabite	40
PH-CEB	Cebu	Sebu	07
PH-NCO	Cotabato	Kotabato	12
PH-COM	Davao de Oro		11
PH-DAV	Davao del Norte	Hilagang Dabaw	11
PH-DAS	Davao del Sur	Timog Dabaw	11
PH-DVO	Davao Occidental	Kanlurang Dabaw	11
PH-DAO	Davao Oriental	Silangang Dabaw	11
PH-DIN	Dinagat Islands	Pulo ng Dinagat	13
PH-EAS	Eastern Samar	Silangang Samar	08
PH-GUI	Guimaras	Gimaras	06
PH-IFU	Ifugao	Ipugaw	15
PH-ILN	Ilocos Norte	Hilagang Iloko	01
PH-ILS	Ilocos Sur	Timog Iloko	01
PH-ILI	Iloilo	Iloilo	06
PH-ISA	Isabela	Isabela	02
PH-KAL	Kalinga	Kalinga	15
PH-LUN	La Union	La Unyon	01
PH-LAG	Laguna	Laguna	40
PH-LAN	Lanao del Norte	Hilagang Lanaw	12 (Note: Lanao del Norte has been moved from Soccsksargen to Northern Mindanao (PH-10).)
PH-LAS	Lanao del Sur	Timog Lanaw	14
PH-LEY	Leyte	Leyte	08
PH-MAD	Marinduque	Marinduke	41
PH-MAS	Masbate	Masbate	05
PH-MDC	Mindoro Occidental	Kanlurang Mindoro	41
PH-MDR	Mindoro Oriental	Silangang Mindoro	41
PH-MGN	Maguindanao del Norte	Hilagang Magindanaw	14
PH-MGS	Maguindanao del Sur	Timog Magindanaw	14
PH-MSC	Misamis Occidental	Kanlurang Misamis	10
PH-MSR	Misamis Oriental	Silangang Misamis	10
PH-MOU	Mountain Province	Lalawigang Bulubundukin	15
PH-NEC	Negros Occidental	Kanlurang Negros	06
PH-NER	Negros Oriental	Silangang Negros	07
PH-NSA	Northern Samar	Hilagang Samar	08
PH-NUE	Nueva Ecija	Nuweva Esiha	03
PH-NUV	Nueva Vizcaya	Nuweva Biskaya	02
PH-PLW	Palawan	Palawan	41
PH-PAM	Pampanga	Pampanga	03
PH-PAN	Pangasinan	Pangasinan	01
PH-QUE	Quezon	Keson	40
PH-QUI	Quirino	Kirino	02
PH-RIZ	Rizal	Risal	40
PH-ROM	Romblon	Romblon	41
PH-WSA	Samar (local variant: Western Samar)	Samar	08
PH-SAR	Sarangani	Sarangani	11 (Note: Sarangani has been moved from Davao to Soccsksargen (PH-12).)
PH-SIG	Siquijor	Sikihor	07
PH-SOR	Sorsogon	Sorsogon	05
PH-SCO	South Cotabato	Timog Kotabato	11 (Note: South Cotabato has been moved from Davao to Soccsksargen (PH-12).)
PH-SLE	Southern Leyte	Katimogang Leyte	08
PH-SUK	Sultan Kudarat	Sultan Kudarat	12
PH-SLU	Sulu	Sulu	14
PH-SUN	Surigao del Norte	Hilagang Surigaw	13
PH-SUR	Surigao del Sur	Timog Surigaw	13
PH-TAR	Tarlac	Tarlak	03
PH-TAW	Tawi-Tawi	Tawi-Tawi	14
PH-ZMB	Zambales	Sambales	03
PH-ZAN	Zamboanga del Norte	Hilagang Sambuwangga	09
PH-ZAS	Zamboanga del Sur	Timog Sambuwangga	09
PH-ZSI	Zamboanga Sibugay	Sambuwangga Sibugay	09

== Changes ==
The following changes to the entry have been announced by the ISO 3166/MA since the first publication of ISO 3166-2 in 1998. ISO stopped issuing newsletters in 2013.

Newsletter	Date issued	Description of change in newsletter	Code/Subdivision change
Newsletter I-2	2002-05-21	Addition of one region and six provinces. New list source and code source. Precise specification of and minor corrections to the spelling of names	Subdivisions added: PH-13 Caraga; PH-APA Apayao; PH-BIL Biliran; PH-COM Compostela Valley; PH-GUI Guimaras; PH-SAR Sarangani; PH-ZSI Zamboanga Sibugay; Codes: Cordillera Administrative Region: PH-13 → PH-15
Newsletter II-2	2010-06-30	Addition of the country code prefix as the first code element, addition of names in administrative languages, update of the administrative structure and of the list source	Subdivisions added: PH-40 Calabarzon; PH-41 Mimaropa; PH-DIN Dinagat Islands; Subdivisions deleted: PH-04 Southern Tagalog
Online Browsing; Platform (OBP)	2015-11-27	Addition of province PH-DVO	Subdivisions added: PH-DVO Davao Occidental
Online Browsing; Platform (OBP)	2020-11-24	Change of subdivision name of PH-COM in eng; Deletion of subdivision name of PH-COM in tgl; Update List Source; Correction of the Code Source	Subdivisions renamed: PH-COM Compostela Valley → Davao de Oro
Online Browsing; Platform (OBP)	2023-11-23	Deletion of province PH-MAG; Addition of province PH-MGN, PH-MGS	Subdivision deleted: PH-MAG Maguindanao; Subdivisions added: PH-MGN Maguindanao del Norte; PH-MGS Maguindanao del Sur

== See also ==
- Subdivisions of the Philippines
- FIPS region codes of the Philippines

== Sources ==
- ISO Online Browsing Platform: PH
- Provinces of the Philippines (statoids.com)
