= List of Philippine provinces by population =

This is a list of Philippine provinces sorted by population as of the 2020 census, which was conducted by the Philippine Statistics Authority (PSA).

The population of provinces in this list includes a population of highly urbanized cities, which are administratively independent of the province.

Population counts for the regions do not add up to the national total.

== 2020 Census ==
Rank	Province	Population	% of Population	Notes
—	Metro Manila (Note: Metro Manila is an administrative region, but is included in the table for comparison purposes.)	13,484,462	12.37%	
1	Cebu	5,151,274	4.72%	Includes Cebu City, Lapu-Lapu, and Mandaue
2	Cavite	4,344,829	3.98%	Includes Bacoor, Dasmariñas, General Trias, and Imus
3	Bulacan	3,708,890	3.4%	Includes Malolos and San Jose del Monte
4	Laguna	3,382,193	3.1%	Includes Biñan, Cabuyao, Calamba, San Pablo, San Pedro, Santa Rosa
5	Rizal	3,330,143	3.05%	Includes Antipolo
6	Negros Occidental	3,223,955	2.96%	Includes Bacolod
7	Pangasinan	3,163,190	2.9%	Includes Dagupan
8	Batangas	2,908,494	2.67%	Includes Batangas City and Lipa
9	Pampanga	2,900,637	2.66%	Includes Angeles City and San Fernando
10	Iloilo	2,509,525	2.3%	Includes Iloilo City
11	Davao del Sur	2,457,430	2.25%	Includes Davao City
12	Nueva Ecija	2,310,134	2.12%	Includes Cabanatuan
13	Quezon	2,229,383	2.04%	Includes Lucena
14	Camarines Sur	2,068,244	1.9%	Includes Naga
15	Leyte	2,028,728	1.86%	Includes Tacloban and Ormoc
16	Zamboanga del Sur	2,027,902	1.86%	Includes Zamboanga City
17	Isabela	1,697,050	1.56%	Includes Santiago City
18	Misamis Oriental	1,685,302	1.55%	Includes Cagayan de Oro
19	South Cotabato	1,672,791	1.53%	Includes General Santos
20	Maguindanao	1,667,258	1.53%	Includes Cotabato City
21	Bukidnon	1,541,308	1.41%	
22	Tarlac	1,503,456	1.38%	Includes Tarlac City
23	Cotabato	1,490,618	1.37%	
24	Negros Oriental	1,432,990	1.31%	
25	Bohol	1,394,329	1.28%	
26	Albay	1,374,768	1.26%	
27	Cagayan	1,268,603	1.16%	
28	Palawan	1,246,673	1.14%	Includes Puerto Princesa
29	Lanao del Sur	1,195,518	1.1%	
30	Davao del Norte	1,125,057	1.03%	
31	Lanao del Norte	1,086,017	1%	Includes Iligan
32	Zamboanga del Norte	1,047,455	0.96%	
33	Sulu	1,000,108	0.92%	
34	Zambales	909,932	0.83%	Includes Olongapo
35	Masbate	908,920	0.83%	
36	Oriental Mindoro	908,339	0.83%	
37	Sultan Kudarat	854,052	0.78%	
38	Bataan	853,373	0.78%	
39	Sorsogon	828,655	0.76%	
40	Benguet	827,041	0.76%	Includes Baguio
41	La Union	822,352	0.75%	
42	Capiz	804,952	0.74%	
43	Samar	793,183	0.73%	
44	Davao de Oro	767,547	0.7%	
45	Agusan del Norte	760,413	0.7%	Includes Butuan
46	Agusan del Sur	739,367	0.68%	
47	Ilocos Sur	706,009	0.65%	
48	Zamboanga Sibugay	669,840	0.61%	
49	Surigao del Sur	642,255	0.59%	
50	Northern Samar	639,186	0.59%	
51	Camarines Norte	629,699	0.58%	
52	Misamis Occidental	617,333	0.57%	
53	Aklan	615,475	0.56%	
54	Antique	612,974	0.56%	
55	Ilocos Norte	609,588	0.56%	
56	Davao Oriental	576,343	0.53%	
57	Sarangani	558,946	0.51%	
58	Basilan	556,586	0.51%	Includes Isabela City
59	Surigao del Norte	534,636	0.49%	
60	Occidental Mindoro	525,354	0.48%	
61	Nueva Vizcaya	497,432	0.46%	
62	Eastern Samar	477,168	0.44%	
63	Tawi-tawi	440,276	0.4%	
64	Southern Leyte	429,573	0.39%	
65	Davao Occidental	317,159	0.29%	
66	Romblon	308,985	0.28%	
67	Catanduanes	271,879	0.25%	
68	Abra	250,985	0.23%	
69	Marinduque	239,207	0.22%	
70	Aurora	235,750	0.22%	
71	Kalinga	229,570	0.21%	
72	Ifugao	207,498	0.19%	
73	Quirino	203,828	0.19%	
74	Guimaras	187,842	0.17%	
75	Biliran	179,312	0.16%	
76	Mountain Province	158,200	0.15%	
77	Dinagat Islands	128,117	0.12%	
78	Apayao	124,366	0.11%	
79	Siquijor	103,395	0.09%	
80	Camiguin	92,808	0.09%	
81	Batanes	18,831	0.02%	
—	Philippines	109,033,245	100%	

== 2015 Census ==
Rank	Province	Population	% of Population	Notes
—	Metro Manila (Note: Metro Manila is an administrative region, but is included in the table for comparison purposes.)	12,877,253	12.75%	
1	Cebu	4,632,359	4.59%	Includes Cebu City, Lapu-Lapu, and Mandaue
2	Cavite	3,678,301	3.64%	
3	Bulacan	3,292,071	3.26%	
4	Negros Occidental	3,059,136	3.03%	Includes Bacolod
5	Laguna	3,035,081	3.01%	
6	Pangasinan	2,956,726	2.93%	
7	Rizal	2,884,227	2.86%	
8	Batangas	2,694,335	2.67%	
9	Pampanga	2,609,744	2.58%	Includes Angeles City
10	Iloilo	2,384,415	2.36%	Includes Iloilo City
11	Davao del Sur	2,265,579	2.24%	Includes Davao City
12	Nueva Ecija	2,151,461	2.13%	
13	Quezon	2,122,830	2.1%	Includes Lucena
14	Leyte	1,966,768	1.95%	Includes Tacloban
15	Camarines Sur	1,952,544	1.93%	
16	Zamboanga del Sur	1,872,473	1.85%	Includes Zamboanga City
17	Isabela	1,593,566	1.58%	
18	Misamis Oriental	1,564,459	1.55%	Includes Cagayan de Oro
19	South Cotabato	1,509,735	1.5%	Includes General Santos
20	Maguindanao	1,473,933	1.46%	Includes Cotabato City
21	Bukidnon	1,415,226	1.4%	
22	Cotabato	1,379,747	1.37%	
23	Tarlac	1,366,027	1.35%	
24	Negros Oriental	1,354,995	1.34%	
25	Albay	1,314,826	1.3%	
26	Bohol	1,313,560	1.3%	
27	Cagayan	1,199,320	1.19%	
28	Palawan	1,104,585	1.09%	Includes Puerto Princesa
29	Lanao del Sur	1,045,429	1.04%	
30	Lanao del Norte	1,019,013	1.01%	Includes Iligan
31	Davao del Norte	1,016,332	1.01%	
32	Zamboanga del Norte	1,011,393	1%	
33	Masbate	892,393	0.88%	
34	Oriental Mindoro	844,059	0.84%	
35	Sulu	824,731	0.82%	
36	Zambales	828,888	0.82%	Includes Olongapo
37	Sultan Kudarat	812,095	0.8%	
38	Sorsogon	792,949	0.79%	
39	Benguet	791,590	0.78%	Includes Baguio
40	La Union	786,653	0.78%	
41	Samar	780,481	0.77%	
42	Capiz	761,384	0.75%	
43	Bataan	760,650	0.75%	
44	Davao de Oro	736,107	0.73%	
45	Agusan del Sur	700,653	0.69%	
46	Agusan del Norte	691,566	0.68%	Includes Butuan
47	Ilocos Sur	689,668	0.68%	
48	Zamboanga Sibugay	633,129	0.63%	
49	Northern Samar	632,679	0.63%	
50	Misamis Occidental	602,126	0.6%	
51	Ilocos Norte	593,081	0.59%	
52	Surigao del Sur	592,250	0.59%	
53	Camarines Norte	583,313	0.58%	
54	Antique	582,012	0.58%	
55	Aklan	574,823	0.57%	
56	Davao Oriental	558,958	0.55%	
57	Sarangani	544,261	0.54%	
58	Occidental Mindoro	487,414	0.48%	
59	Surigao del Norte	485,088	0.48%	
60	Eastern Samar	467,160	0.46%	
61	Basilan	459,367	0.45%	Including Isabela City
62	Nueva Vizcaya	452,287	0.45%	
63	Southern Leyte	421,750	0.42%	
64	Tawi-Tawi	390,715	0.39%	
65	Davao Occidental	316,342	0.31%	
66	Romblon	292,781	0.29%	
67	Catanduanes	260,964	0.26%	
68	Abra	241,160	0.24%	
69	Marinduque	234,521	0.23%	
70	Aurora	214,336	0.21%	
71	Kalinga	212,680	0.21%	
72	Ifugao	202,802	0.2%	
73	Quirino	188,991	0.19%	
74	Guimaras	174,613	0.17%	
75	Biliran	171,612	0.17%	
76	Mountain Province	154,590	0.15%	
77	Dinagat Islands	127,152	0.13%	
78	Apayao	119,184	0.12%	
79	Siquijor	95,984	0.1%	
80	Camiguin	88,478	0.09%	
81	Batanes	17,246	0.02%	
—	Philippines	100,981,437	100%	

== 2000 Census ==
Showing provinces existing at the time of census. Figures do not add up to total as population in disputed areas are added up to the next higher subdivision.

Rank	Province	Population	% of Population	Notes
—	Philippines	76,498,735	100%	
—	Metro Manila	9,932,560	12.98%	
1	Cebu	3,356,137	4.39%	Includes Cebu City
2	Negros Occidental	2,565,723	3.35%	Includes Bacolod
3	Pangasinan	2,434,086	3.18%	
4	Zamboanga del Sur	2,432,489	3.18%	Includes Zamboanga City
5	Bulacan	2,234,088	2.92%	
6	Cavite	2,063,161	2.7%	
7	Laguna	1,965,872	2.57%	
8	Iloilo	1,925,002	2.52%	Includes Iloilo City
9	Davao del Sur	1,905,917	2.49%	Includes Davao City
10	Batangas	1,905,348	2.49%	
11	Pampanga	1,882,730	2.46%	Includes Angeles City
12	Rizal	1,707,218	2.23%	
13	Quezon	1,679,030	2.19%	
14	Nueva Ecija	1,659,883	2.17%	
15	Leyte	1,592,336	2.08%	
16	Camarines Sur	1,551,549	2.03%	
17	Isabela	1,287,575	1.68%	
18	Bohol	1,137,268	1.49%	
19	Misamis Oriental	1,126,215	1.47%	Includes Cagayan de Oro
20	Negros Oriental	1,126,061	1.47%	
21	South Cotabato	1,102,550	1.44%	Includes General Santos
22	Albay	1,090,907	1.43%	
23	Tarlac	1,068,783	1.4%	
24	Bukidnon	1,060,265	1.39%	
25	Cagayan	993,580	1.3%	
26	Maguindanao	964,951	1.26%	Includes Cotabato City
27	Cotabato	958,643	1.25%	
28	Zamboanga del Norte	823,130	1.08%	
29	Lanao del Sur	800,162	1.05%	
30	Lanao del Norte	758,123	0.99%	Includes Iligan
31	Palawan	755,412	0.99%	
32	Davao del Norte	743,811	0.97%	
33	Masbate	707,668	0.93%	
34	Oriental Mindoro	681,818	0.89%	
35	La Union	657,945	0.86%	
36	Capiz	654,156	0.86%	
37	Sorsogon	650,535	0.85%	
38	Samar	641,124	0.84%	
39	Zambales	627,802	0.82%	Includes Olongapo
40	Sulu	619,668	0.81%	
41	Ilocos Sur	594,206	0.78%	
42	Sultan Kudarat	586,505	0.77%	
43	Benguet	582,515	0.76%	Includes Baguio
44	Compostela Valley	580,244	0.76%	
45	Agusan del Sur	559,294	0.73%	
46	Bataan	557,659	0.73%	
47	Agusan del Norte	552,849	0.72%	Includes Butuan
48	Ilocos Norte	514,241	0.67%	
49	Surigao del Sur	501,808	0.66%	
50	Northern Samar	500,639	0.65%	
51	Misamis Occidental	486,723	0.64%	
52	Surigao del Norte	481,416	0.63%	
53	Antique	471,088	0.62%	
54	Camarines Norte	458,840	0.6%	
55	Aklan	451,314	0.59%	
56	Davao Oriental	446,191	0.58%	
57	Sarangani	410,622	0.54%	
58	Occidental Mindoro	380,250	0.5%	
59	Eastern Samar	375,822	0.49%	
60	Nueva Vizcaya	366,962	0.48%	
61	Southern Leyte	360,160	0.47%	
62	Basilan	332,828	0.44%	
63	Tawi-Tawi	322,317	0.42%	
64	Romblon	264,357	0.35%	
65	Marinduque	217,392	0.28%	
66	Catanduanes	215,356	0.28%	
67	Abra	209,491	0.27%	
68	Kalinga	174,023	0.23%	
69	Aurora	173,797	0.23%	
70	Ifugao	161,623	0.21%	
71	Quirino	148,575	0.19%	
72	Guimaras	141,450	0.18%	
73	Mountain Province	140,439	0.18%	
74	Biliran	140,274	0.18%	
75	Apayao	97,129	0.13%	
76	Siquijor	81,598	0.11%	
77	Camiguin	74,232	0.1%	
78	Batanes	16,467	0.02%	

== 1995 Census ==
Showing provinces existing at the time of census.

Rank	Province	Population	% of Population	Notes
—	Philippines	76,498,735	100%	
—	Metro Manila	9,932,560	12.98%	
1	Cebu	3,356,137	4.39%	Includes Cebu City
2	Negros Occidental	2,565,723	3.35%	Includes Bacolod
3	Pangasinan	2,434,086	3.18%	
4	Zamboanga del Sur	2,432,489	3.18%	Includes Zamboanga City
5	Bulacan	2,234,088	2.92%	
6	Cavite	2,063,161	2.7%	
7	Laguna	1,965,872	2.57%	
8	Iloilo	1,925,002	2.52%	Includes Iloilo City
9	Davao del Sur	1,905,917	2.49%	Includes Davao City
10	Batangas	1,905,348	2.49%	
11	Pampanga	1,882,730	2.46%	Includes Angeles City
12	Rizal	1,707,218	2.23%	
13	Quezon	1,679,030	2.19%	
14	Nueva Ecija	1,659,883	2.17%	
15	Leyte	1,592,336	2.08%	
16	Camarines Sur	1,551,549	2.03%	
17	Isabela	1,287,575	1.68%	
18	Bohol	1,137,268	1.49%	
19	Misamis Oriental	1,126,215	1.47%	Includes Cagayan de Oro
20	Negros Oriental	1,126,061	1.47%	
21	South Cotabato	1,102,550	1.44%	Includes General Santos
22	Albay	1,090,907	1.43%	
23	Tarlac	1,068,783	1.4%	
24	Bukidnon	1,060,265	1.39%	
25	Cagayan	993,580	1.3%	
26	Maguindanao	964,951	1.26%	Includes Cotabato City
27	Cotabato	958,643	1.25%	
28	Zamboanga del Norte	823,130	1.08%	
29	Lanao del Sur	800,162	1.05%	
30	Lanao del Norte	758,123	0.99%	Includes Iligan
31	Palawan	755,412	0.99%	
32	Davao del Norte	743,811	0.97%	
33	Masbate	707,668	0.93%	
34	Oriental Mindoro	681,818	0.89%	
35	La Union	657,945	0.86%	
36	Capiz	654,156	0.86%	
37	Sorsogon	650,535	0.85%	
38	Samar	641,124	0.84%	
39	Zambales	627,802	0.82%	Includes Olongapo
40	Sulu	619,668	0.81%	
41	Ilocos Sur	594,206	0.78%	
42	Sultan Kudarat	586,505	0.77%	
43	Benguet	582,515	0.76%	Includes Baguio
44	Compostela Valley	580,244	0.76%	
45	Agusan del Sur	559,294	0.73%	
46	Bataan	557,659	0.73%	
47	Agusan del Norte	552,849	0.72%	Includes Butuan
48	Ilocos Norte	514,241	0.67%	
49	Surigao del Sur	501,808	0.66%	
50	Northern Samar	500,639	0.65%	
51	Misamis Occidental	486,723	0.64%	
52	Surigao del Norte	481,416	0.63%	
53	Antique	471,088	0.62%	
54	Camarines Norte	458,840	0.6%	
55	Aklan	451,314	0.59%	
56	Davao Oriental	446,191	0.58%	
57	Sarangani	410,622	0.54%	
58	Occidental Mindoro	380,250	0.5%	
59	Eastern Samar	375,822	0.49%	
60	Nueva Vizcaya	366,962	0.48%	
61	Southern Leyte	360,160	0.47%	
62	Basilan	332,828	0.44%	
63	Tawi-Tawi	322,317	0.42%	
64	Romblon	264,357	0.35%	
65	Marinduque	217,392	0.28%	
66	Catanduanes	215,356	0.28%	
67	Abra	209,491	0.27%	
68	Kalinga	174,023	0.23%	
69	Aurora	173,797	0.23%	
70	Ifugao	161,623	0.21%	
71	Quirino	148,575	0.19%	
72	Guimaras	141,450	0.18%	
73	Mountain Province	140,439	0.18%	
74	Biliran	140,274	0.18%	
75	Apayao	97,129	0.13%	
76	Siquijor	81,598	0.11%	
77	Camiguin	74,232	0.1%	
78	Batanes	16,467	0.02%	

== 1975 Census ==
Showing provinces existing at the time of census.

Rank	Province	Population	% of Population	Notes
—	Philippines	42,070,660	100%	
1	Rizal	3,754,477	8.92%	
2	Cebu	1,818,410	4.32%	
3	Negros Occidental	1,785,792	4.24%	
4	Pangasinan	1,520,085	3.61%	
—	Manila	1,479,116	3.52%	
5	Iloilo	1,313,049	3.12%	
6	Leyte	1,203,118	2.86%	
7	Quezon	1,115,962	2.65%	
8	Bulacan	1,050,134	2.5%	
9	Pampanga	1,042,164	2.48%	
10	Batangas	1,032,009	2.45%	
11	Camarines Sur	1,023,819	2.43%	
12	Zamboanga del Sur	1,002,852	2.38%	
13	Nueva Ecija	947,995	2.25%	
14	Davao del Sur	936,263	2.23%	
15	Laguna	803,750	1.91%	
16	Bohol	759,370	1.8%	
17	Negros Oriental	740,412	1.76%	
18	Isabela	730,386	1.74%	
19	Albay	728,827	1.73%	
20	Cagayan	644,075	1.53%	
21	Tarlac	640,899	1.52%	
22	Cavite	628,321	1.49%	
23	South Cotabato	586,867	1.39%	
24	Davao del Norte	569,697	1.35%	
25	Misamis Oriental	560,490	1.33%	
26	Bukidnon	522,818	1.24%	
27	Masbate	533,387	1.27%	
28	Lanao del Sur	499,882	1.19%	
29	Samar	478,378	1.14%	
30	Maguindanao	478,119	1.14%	
31	Cotabato	472,302	1.12%	
32	Zamboanga del Norte	460,515	1.09%	
33	Sorsogon	446,502	1.06%	
34	Capiz	445,716	1.06%	
35	Zambales	416,280	0.99%	
36	La Union	414,635	0.99%	
37	Ilocos Sur	399,776	0.95%	
38	Oriental Mindoro	388,744	0.92%	
39	Lanao del Norte	381,234	0.91%	
40	Ilocos Norte	371,724	0.88%	
41	Misamis Occidental	366,319	0.88%	
42	Northern Samar	354,665	0.84%	
43	Sultan Kudarat	328,912	0.78%	
44	Antique	308,484	0.73%	
45	Surigao del Sur	302,305	0.72%	
46	Benguet	302,065	0.72%	
47	Agusan del Norte	300,735	0.71%	
48	Palawan	300,065	0.71%	
49	Davao Oriental	299,426	0.71%	
50	Surigao del Norte	298,080	0.71%	
51	Aklan	293,349	0.7%	
52	Camarines Norte	288,406	0.69%	
53	Eastern Samar	287,149	0.68%	
54	Southern Leyte	276,418	0.66%	
55	Bataan	263,269	0.63%	
56	Sulu	240,001	0.57%	
57	Agusan del Sur	213,216	0.51%	
58	Nueva Vizcaya	213,151	0.51%	
59	Occidental Mindoro	185,787	0.44%	
60	Romblon	182,209	0.43%	
61	Catanduanes	172,780	0.41%	
62	Basilan	171,027	0.41%	
63	Kalinga-Apayao	163,225	0.39%	
64	Marinduque	162,804	0.39%	
65	Abra	147,010	0.35%	
66	Tawi-Tawi	143,487	0.34%	
67	Ifugao	104,707	0.25%	
68	Mountain Province	94,096	0.22%	
69	Siquijor	69,077	0.16%	
70	Quirino	65,763	0.16%	
71	Camiguin	52,547	0.12%	
72	Batanes	11,870	0.03%	

== 1903 Census ==
Showing provinces existing at the time of census.

Rank	Province	Population	Notes
—	Philippines	7,635,426	
1	Cebu	653,727	
2	Pangasinan	443,521	
3	Iloilo	410,315	
4	Moro Province	402,014	Includes districts of Cotabato (46,558); Davao (65,496); Lanao (101,293); Sulu (90,589); Zamboanga (98,078)
5	Leyte	388,922	
6	Negros Occidental	308,272	
7	Bohol	269,223	
8	Samar	266,237	
9	Batangas	257,715	
10	Albay	240,326	
11	Ambos Camarines	239,405	
12	Capiz	230,721	
13	Pampanga	223,754	
14	Bulacan	223,742	
—	Manila	219,928	
15	Tayabas	204,739	
16	Negros Oriental	201,494	
17	Ilocos Sur	187,411	
18	Ilocos Norte	178,995	
19	Cagayan	156,239	Includes sub-province of Apayao
20	Misamis	153,707	
21	Rizal	150,923	
22	La Laguna	148,606	
23	La Union	137,839	
24	Tarlac	135,107	
25	Cavite	134,779	
26	Nueva Ecija	134,147	
27	Antique	134,166	
28	Sorsogon	120,495	
29	Surigao	115,112	
30	Isabela	76,431	
31	Lepanto-Bontoc	72,750	Includes sub-provinces of Amburayan, Kalinga
32	Nueva Vizcaya	62,541	
33	Zambales	58,930	
34	Abra	51,860	
35	Bataan	46,787	
36	Masbate	43,675	
37	Mindoro	39,582	
38	Paragua	35,696	
39	Benguet	21,280	

== See also ==
- Demographics of the Philippines
- Provinces of the Philippines
- List of Philippine provinces by Human Development Index

== Sources ==
- Census 2000 Final Count
