= List of Philippine provinces and regions by poverty rate =

This is a list of regions and provinces of the Philippines by poverty rate as of 2021. The international poverty rate used by the World Bank is used in the following list. The national poverty rate of the Philippines was estimated to be at 22.4% in early 2023. This was the share of the Population whose per capita income was not sufficient to meet the basic food and non-food needs.

== List of regions ==
Percent of population living on less than $2.15, $3.65 and $6.85 a day, international dollars (2017 PPP) as per the World Bank.

Percent of population living on less than poverty thresholds
Region	$2.15	$3.65	$6.85	Year of estimate
Philippines	2.99%	17.99%	55.27%	2021
Ilocos Region	2.07%	13.87%	55.39%	2021
Cagayan Valley	1.80%	15.11%	54.81%	2021
Central Luzon	1.36%	11.11%	50.37%	2021
Calabarzon	1.05%	10.05%	44.41%	2021
Mimaropa	3.46%	20.44%	59.13%	2021
Bicol Region	4.29%	28.75%	69.37%	2021
Western Visayas	2.49%	18.69%	58.13%	2021
Central Visayas	6.21%	27.10%	64.48%	2021
Eastern Visayas	5.18%	28.54%	68.09%	2021
Zamboanga Peninsula	7.27%	29.63%	67.39%	2021
Northern Mindanao	4.89%	25.83%	66.17%	2021
Davao Region	2.48%	16.36%	55.81%	2021
Soccsksargen	6.24%	27.79%	65.79%	2021
Metro Manila	0.09%	3.36%	31.63%	2021
Cordillera Administrative Region	0.89%	9.75%	43.20%	2021
Bangsamoro	6.52%	36.66%	86.65%	2021
Caraga	6.46%	32.78%	70.39%	2021

== List of provinces ==
Percent of population living on less than $2.15, $3.65 and $6.85 a day, international dollars (2017 PPP) as per the World Bank.

Percent of population living on less than poverty thresholds
Province	$2.15	$3.65	$6.85	Year of estimate
Philippines	2.99%	17.99%	55.27%	2021
Batangas	0.31%	6.21%	42.05%	2021
Benguet	0.50%	5.54%	33.90%	2021
Bohol	4.37%	23.33%	62.06%	2021
Bukidnon	6.45%	29.17%	68.03%	2021
Bulacan	1.69%	10.75%	51.95%	2021
Cagayan	0.61%	9.85%	51.28%	2021
Camarines Norte	1.92%	21.65%	64.27%	2021
Camarines Sur	7.41%	38.13%	73.36%	2021
Camiguin	2.87%	20.20%	62.10%	2021
Capiz	0.28%	9.28%	52.48%	2021
Abra	2.33%	21.13%	60.40%	2021
Catanduanes	1.63%	22.99%	64.46%	2021
Cavite	1.29%	9.96%	43.82%	2021
Cebu	6.86%	28.15%	65.14%	2021
Davao del Norte	1.44%	8.35%	44.68%	2021
Davao Oriental	2.21%	29.82%	75.45%	2021
Eastern Samar	7.66%	37.39%	70.48%	2021
Ifugao	0.38%	7.76%	44.81%	2021
Ilocos Norte	0.00%	2.45%	36.40%	2021
Ilocos Sur	1.94%	14.27%	54.97%	2021
Agusan del Norte	6.85%	30.33%	65.53%	2021
Iloilo	3.25%	17.45%	51.52%	2021
Isabela	2.74%	19.92%	59.42%	2021
Kalinga	0.80%	8.25%	42.99%	2021
La Union	0.75%	8.98%	45.89%	2021
Laguna	0.98%	9.37%	41.13%	2021
Lanao del Norte	8.40%	34.08%	72.35%	2021
Lanao del Sur	0.00%	10.19%	83.83%	2021
Leyte	5.97%	27.30%	66.85%	2021
Agusan del Sur	8.14%	40.99%	77.45%	2021
Marinduque	2.07%	21.53%	62.40%	2021
Masbate	3.58%	27.30%	74.28%	2021
Misamis Occidental	2.20%	23.98%	71.33%	2021
Misamis Oriental	2.35%	18.49%	58.85%	2021
Mountain Province	2.25%	21.95%	62.62%	2021
Negros Occidental	2.08%	21.45%	64.59%	2021
Negros Oriental	6.08%	28.62%	66.14%	2021
Northern Samar	1.82%	25.50%	66.69%	2021
Nueva Ecija	1.21%	13.60%	56.35%	2021
Aklan	3.25%	19.72%	59.22%	2021
Nueva Vizcaya	2.29%	15.07%	53.88%	2021
Occidental Mindoro	6.61%	29.94%	65.40%	2021
Oriental Mindoro	3.95%	17.96%	52.00%	2021
Palawan	1.20%	13.33%	56.83%	2021
Pampanga	0.18%	4.35%	39.93%	2021
Pangasinan	2.85%	17.32%	61.74%	2021
Quezon	2.93%	21.39%	63.86%	2021
Quirino	0.38%	9.08%	42.87%	2021
Rizal	0.19%	6.59%	37.23%	2021
Romblon	6.91%	39.68%	76.57%	2021
Albay	2.25%	19.95%	59.99%	2021
Samar (Western)	5.92%	33.04%	73.58%	2021
Siquijor	0.00%	3.36%	40.36%	2021
Sorsogon	3.48%	29.17%	75.05%	2021
South Cotabato	3.47%	16.36%	52.76%	2021
Southern Leyte	2.59%	21.30%	64.82%	2021
Sultan Kudarat	5.51%	29.85%	69.71%	2021
Sulu	13.29%	61.98%	95.34%	2021
Surigao del Norte	4.75%	27.18%	68.35%	2021
Surigao del Sur	5.38%	30.71%	69.42%	2021
Tarlac	1.34%	11.72%	49.81%	2021
Antique	4.22%	23.55%	59.17%	2021
Tawi-Tawi	4.57%	36.13%	79.23%	2021
Zambales	4.14%	23.94%	62.91%	2021
Zamboanga del Norte	16.27%	50.13%	81.09%	2021
Zamboanga del Sur	3.12%	17.93%	58.15%	2021
Aurora	2.62%	21.35%	60.97%	2021
Biliran	4.36%	26.95%	64.42%	2021
Guimaras	0.38%	9.84%	55.43%	2021
Sarangani	11.91%	40.59%	77.44%	2021
Apayao	0.00%	6.68%	46.02%	2021
Davao de Oro	3.19%	23.45%	67.32%	2021
Zamboanga Sibugay	6.35%	33.57%	73.36%	2021
Dinagat Islands	6.96%	33.10%	71.13%	2021
Bataan	1.18%	11.48%	47.46%	2021
Batanes	0.00%	3.33%	28.57%	2021
Basilan	10.16%	43.90%	81.97%	2021
Davao del Sur	5.01%	25.68%	67.00%	2021
Maguindanao	6.29%	37.82%	84.16%	2021
Metro Manila	0.09%	3.36%	31.63%	2021
Cotabato	7.31%	31.78%	70.11%	2021

== See also ==
- Poverty in the Philippines
