= Lake Bato =

Lake in the Philippines

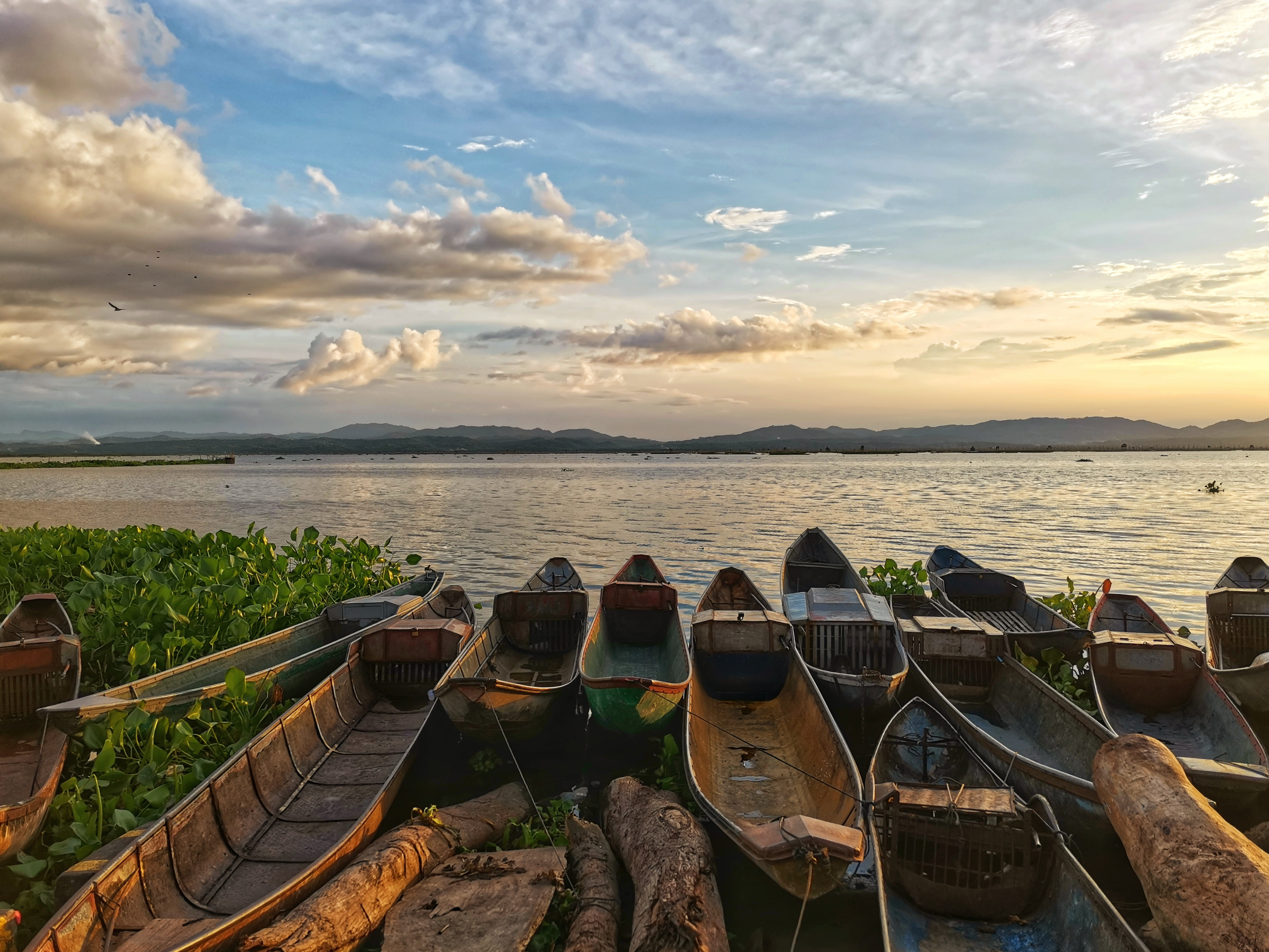

- Location within the Philippines

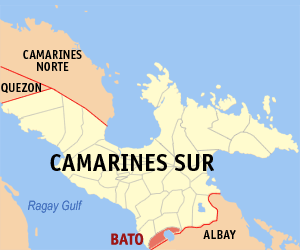
- Map of Camarines Sur highlighting Lake Bato
- Location: Bicol Peninsula, Luzon, Bicol Region (Region V)
- Coordinates: 13°20′00″N 123°22′00″E
- Primary inflows: local run-off and several small streams
- Primary outflows: a tributary of the Bicol River
- Basin countries: Philippines
- Surface area: 2,810 ha (6,900 acres)
- Average depth: 8 m (26 ft)
- Surface elevation: 10 m (33 ft)
- Settlements: Bato

Lake Bato is a freshwater lake and the 7th largest in the Philippines. It is located in the town of Bato, approximately 9 kilometres (5.6 mi) southwest of Iriga City, Camarines Sur Province, southeastern Luzon, Philippines. It has extensive marshes and swamp forests. The lake drains into a tributary of the Bicol River which enters the sea near Naga City. Average depth is 8 metres (26 ft), and the bottom is muddy clay. The pH value is 6.1, the average dissolved oxygen 10 p.p.m., and the total hardness (SBY) 2.4.

== History ==
The lake was originally called Sadit na Ranow by natives living around the area and a small settlement called Caliligno was founded on its shores during pre-Spanish times; the early settlers thrived on the lake's rich resources and use it as a primary medium of travel. The settlement flourished on to become the present-day town of Bato, Camarines Sur and the lake came to be named after the town, which was established by a decree of the Superior Government (National Government) on February 15, 1758, when the Philippines was still under the Viceroyalty of New Spain.

== The Sinarapan ==
Lake Bato is part of the Rinconada (Bicol) Lakes System, which also includes Lake Buhi and Lake Baao-Bula. It is known that the Sinarapan (Mistichthys luzonensis), the world's smallest commercially harvested fish in the world, is also found in its waters. Sinarapan literally means "caught by sarap" in Buhi in this early historical context. However, the same fish is called tabios in Bato, Nabua, Baao and Bula, Camarines Sur. The etymology of tabios, however, is quite vague. The name is not found in the scientific literature unlike "Sinarapan". It is believed that Tabios is only used in the vernacular pertaining to the local fishery. At present, the Sinarapan is threatened by extinction due to over-fishing and other factors but efforts to conserve it are ongoing. Such is this specie's importance to the lake's ecosystem since it is endemic only to this region.

== Related Stories ==
In the year 1772, the people were discouraged to catch fish because many crocodiles inhabited the lake. The boats were seized and the boatman or sailors were eaten up. Many people gave up the fishing industry but with the tenacity of purpose and persistent effort, the fishermen did not lose hope but continued to fish and utilized the lake for their transportation and everyday living.

== Act Now For Ranow Movement ==
In 2020, a group of young professionals established the Act Now For Ranow Movement which is a collaborative movement among the people in Bato to engaged the various sectors of the community in finding ways in preserving and protecting the Lake Bato through different programs and initiatives.

In 2021, the group were chosen as the Most Collaborative and Impactful Projects in the Philippines.

In July 2022, 36 environmental youth advocates joined the first ever batch of Bato Lake Guardians Fellowship which is a three day engaging and immersive capacity building to provide the youth with the platform to lobby their respective propose projects and activities in further escalating the stories of Lake Bato in the larger context of climate justice. The said event were featured in the GMA News Balitang Bicolandia. Recently, the ANFR Movement has been chosen as one of the top 20 finalist in the award giving body for the 20th TAYO Search which the Top 10 will be finally unveil this coming March 12, 2023 at FEU Manila. The winners will receive a trophy sculptured by Toym Imao and a Php, 50,000 for the sustainability and funding of the program.
