= Caramoan Community College =

Local college in Camarines Sur, Philippines

- Kolehiyong Pambayan ng Caramoan (Filipino)
- Motto: God, Country, People
- Type: Local College
- Established: 1977
- Founder: Sangguniang Bayan of Caramoan, Camarines Sur
- Academic affiliations: PAASCU, ALCUCOA
- Chairman: Marilyn Socorro H. Co (Municipal Mayor)
- President: Salvador C. Arcilla Jr. PhD ( College Administrator)
- Dean: Yolanda A. Santelices
- Faculty: 60
- Administrative staff: 27
- Students: 1,700+
- Location: Caramoan, Camarines Sur, Philippines; 13°46′57″N 123°51′39″E
- Campus: Cadong, Caramoan, Camarines Sur
- Colors: Blue and gold
- Location in Luzon Location in the Philippines

The Caramoan Community College is a local college run by the local government unit of Caramoan in the province of Camarines Sur, Philippines. It is also known by the acronym CCC or C Cube (C3). It was established in 1977, and is the first school to offer higher education in the Caramoan Peninsula.

== History ==
=== Early history ===
The Caramoan Community College began in 1977 after the Sangguniang Bayan issued a resolution creating a higher education institution in the municipality to cater the demands of high school graduates which at that time studies at the city just to earn a college degree. The college was then housed at the Caramoan Central School grounds and classes starts at the evening. By virtue of Government Recognition (GR) No. 20, B.S.Ed. & No. 21, B.E.Ed., Series of 2004, the Commission on Higher Education Region V granted the community college to offer Bachelor of Elementary Education (BEED) and Bachelor of Secondary Education (BSED), major in English courses effective since Academic Year 2004–2005.

=== Recent history ===
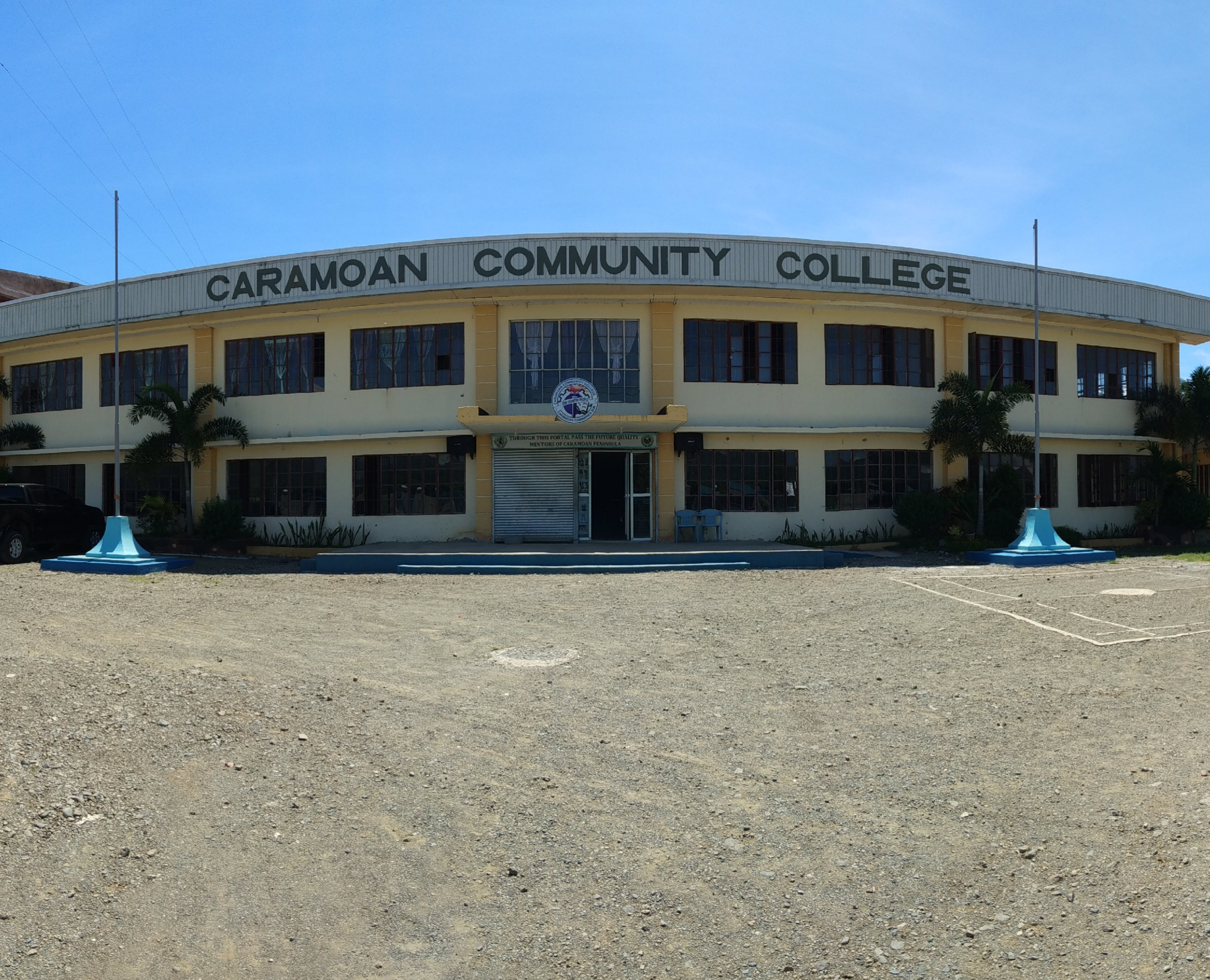
The main college building of the Caramoan Community College inaugurated last November 2014.

On November 21, 2014, the college building was inaugurated at Cadong, Caramoan, Camarines Sur. Since then, it underwent major changes in its college administration. It also started to open classes at morning and afternoon. After the long stay of Dr. Santelices as College Administrator, she was replaced by then BISCAST Professor Dr. Rolando D. Marcaida. Mr. Romeo M. Borja also assumed as the new College Registrar after his retirement at the same state college. Just recently, as the new administration of the municipality started to implement various changes in the college's administration, newly elected Municipal Mayor and chairman of the Board of Trustees Hon. Marilyn Socorro H. Co installed former college instructor and retired Caramoan Central School Principal II Mrs. Ma. Lorna B. Sy as the new College Administrator. Her appointment as the new college head also paved the way for representatives from the Commission on Higher Education in Metro Manila to visit the college and assess the performance of the higher educational institution last August 2019. The college also now offers Bachelor of Arts in Political Science (AB PolSci) and soon to open a graduate school program.

== Administration ==
=== Board of trustees ===
| Name | Position |
|---|---|
| Hon. Marilyn Socorro H. Co | Chairman/Municipal Mayor |
| Ma. Lorna B. Sy | Vice-chairman |
| Romeo M. Borja | Secretary |
| Hon. Christine Mayne C. Savilla | Sangguniang Bayan Chairman, Committee on Education |
| Dr. Amparo Binamira | President, ALCO V |
| Eduardo A. Alarkon | Representative, Private Sector |
| Melanio D. Sarmiento | President, Faculty Club Association |
| Jeffrey V. Padua | President, Alumni Association |
| Angel C. De Vera | President, Supreme Student Council |

=== Administrative officials ===
| Name | Position |
|---|---|
| Salvador C. Arcilla Jr. Ph. D | College Administrator |
| Yolanda A. Santelices | College Dean |
| Irene R. Breis | Assistant College Dean/Director, Quality Assurance |
| Ian Rene D. Nacio | College Registrar |
| Nena F. Sancho | Student Affairs Coordinator |
| Marietta T. Taduran | College Librarian |
| Ginny A. Emerenciana | Practice Teaching Coordinator |
| Leovegildo Sentelices | Guidance Counselor |
| Regalado A. Emerenciana | College Publication Coordinator |
| Regalado A. Emerenciana | Sports Coordinator/Property Custodian |
| Mark Kevin M. Loyola | Majorette Coordinator |

== Academics ==
=== Undergraduate programs ===
College of Education

- Bachelor of Elementary Education (BEED)
- Bachelor of Secondary Education (BSED), major in English

College of Arts and Sciences

- Bachelor of Arts in Political Science (AB PolSci)

== College seal ==
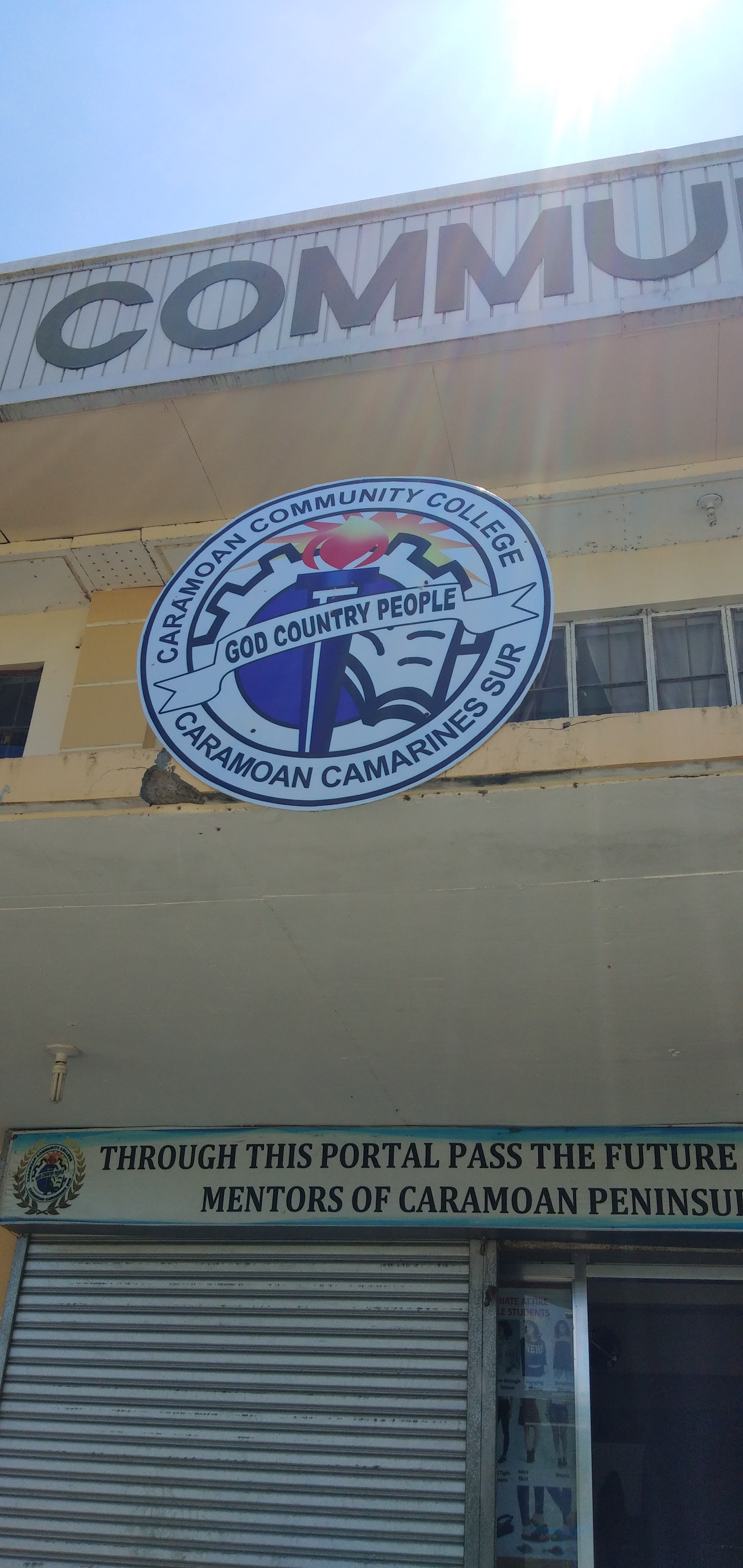
The college seal displayed at the entrance of the main college building.

The college seal is circular in shape containing the name Caramoan Community College. On the lower portion of the circle is the location of the college Caramoan Camarines Sur. Superimposed on the U shape figure are the six rays which symbolize the dedication and the purpose towards the pursuit of Knowledge, Wisdom and Truth in the service to God, Country, and People, with the torch at the center symbolizing education. The blue and gold stripes, which hereof embody the college continuing search for excellence in all spheres of educational endeavors, are the official colors of the college.
