= Camarines Sur =

Province in Bicol, Philippines

- Province
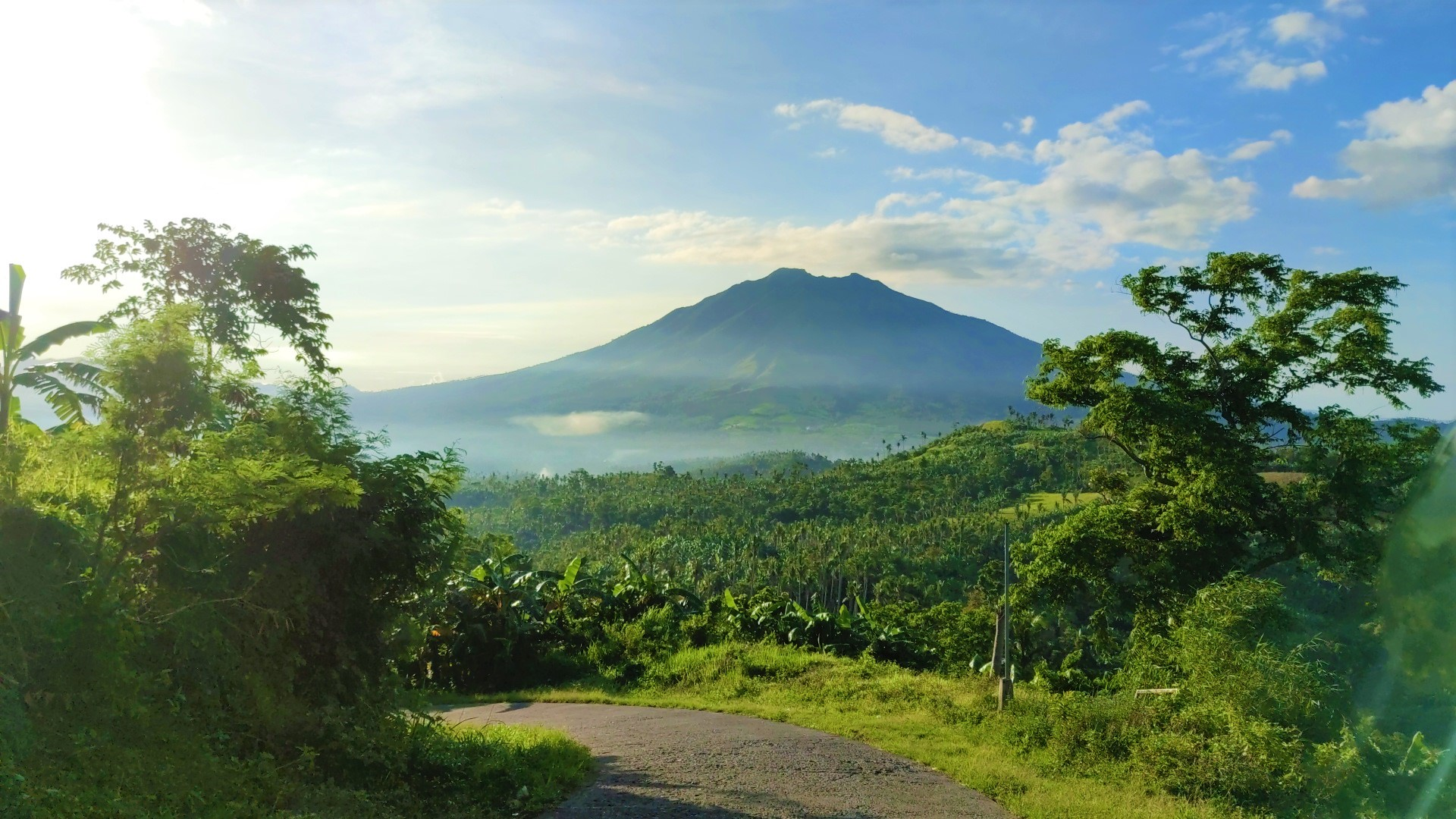
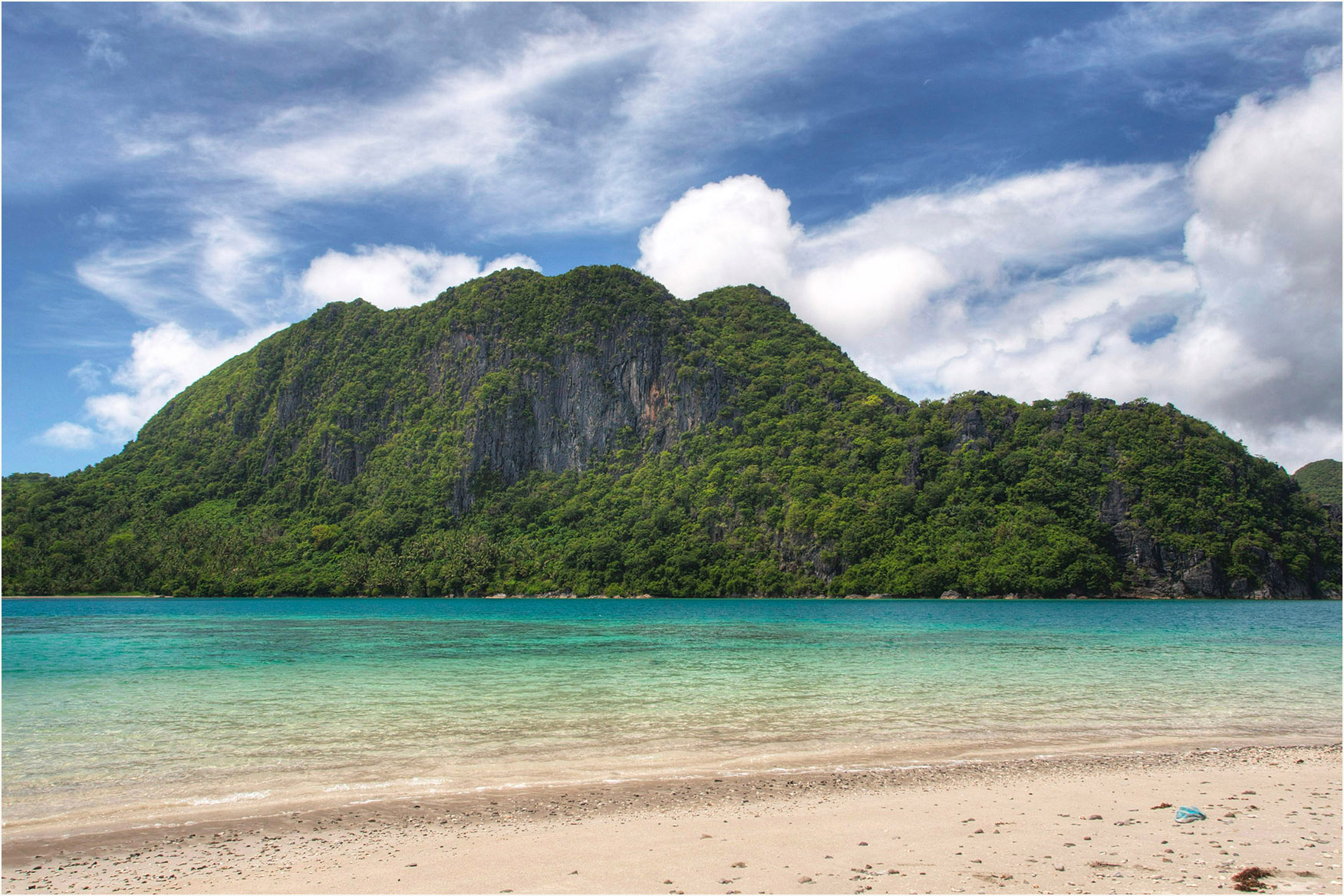
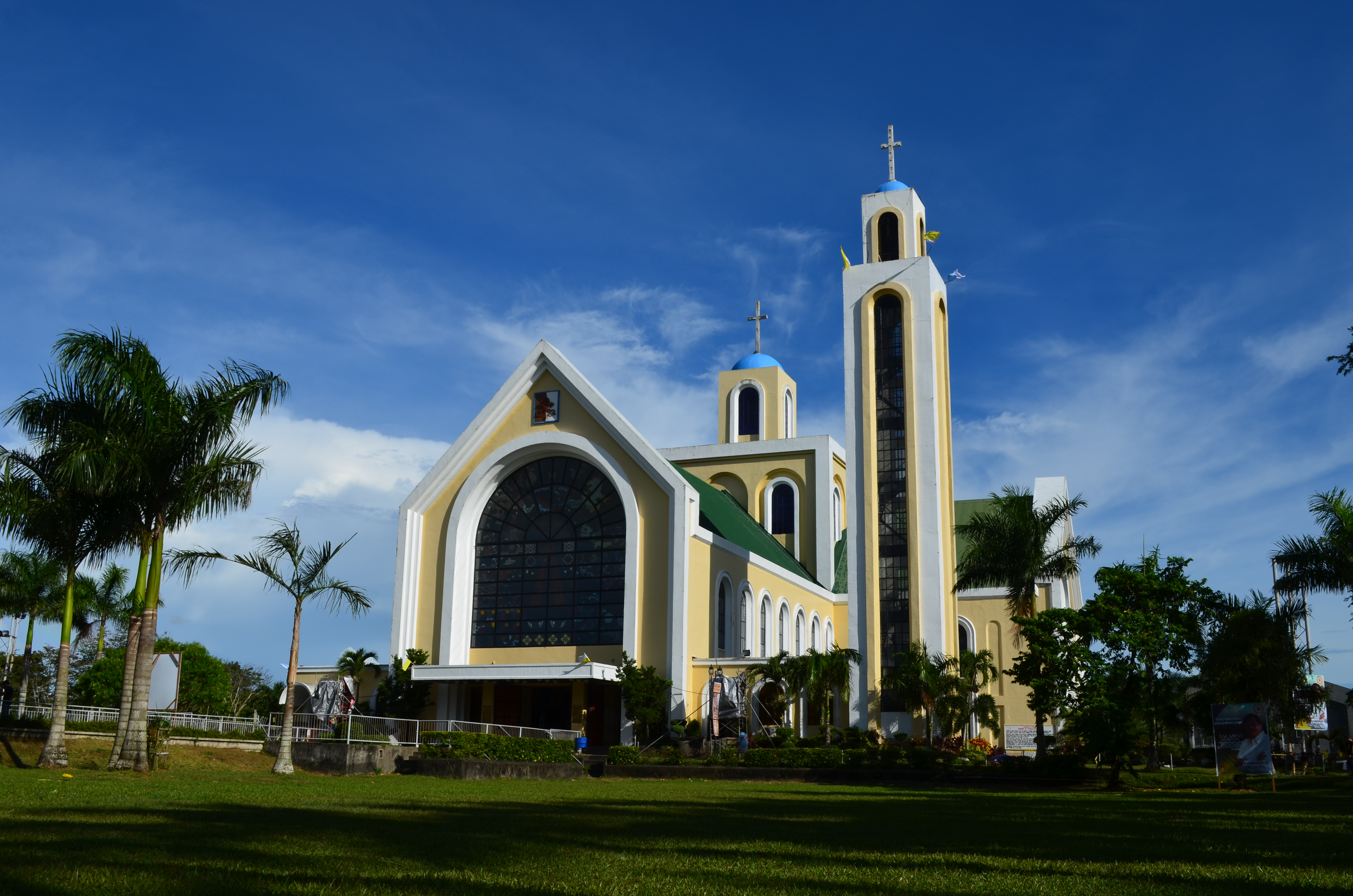
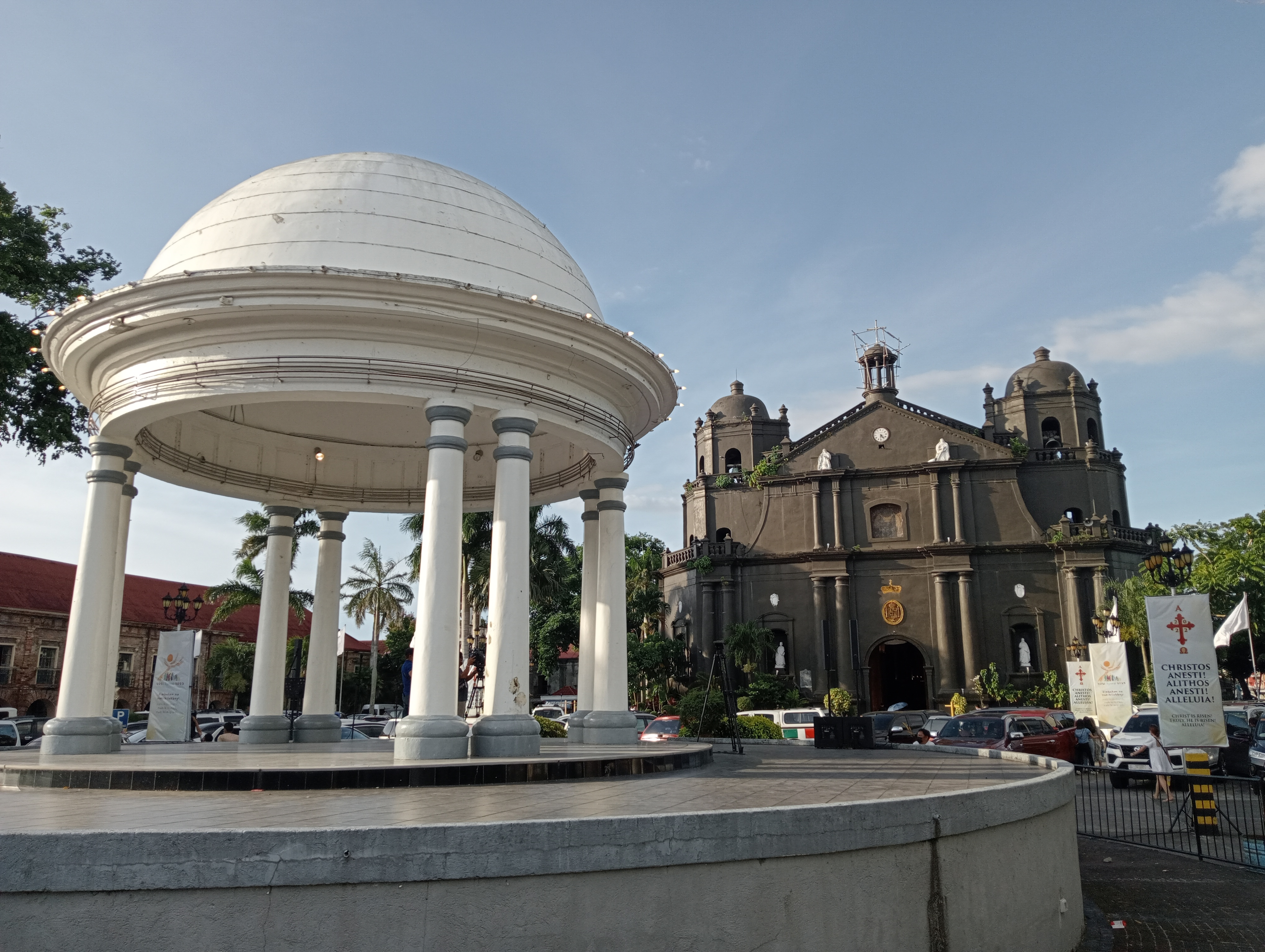
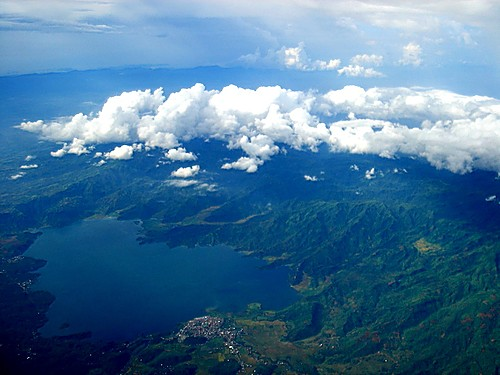
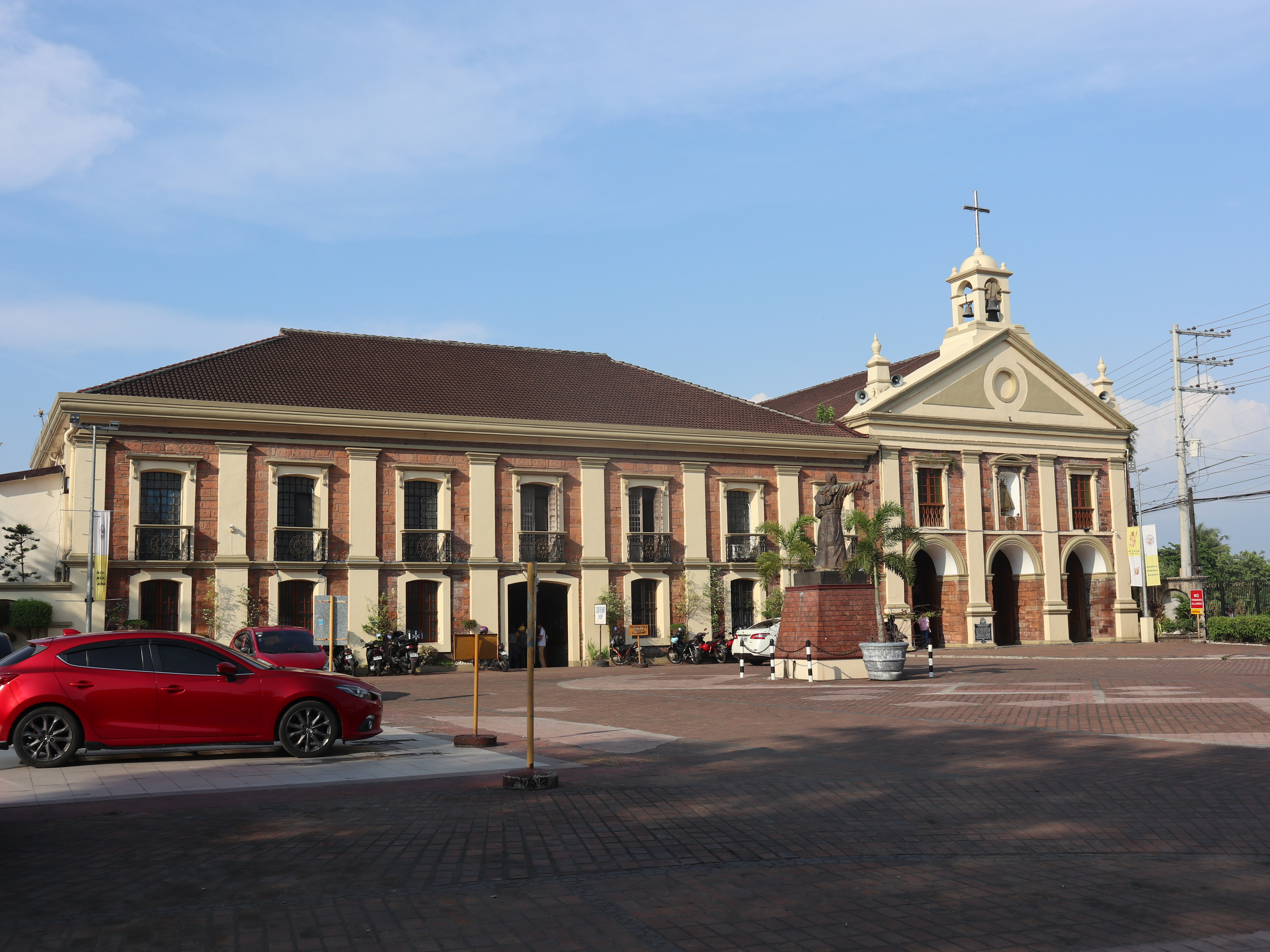
- (from top: left to right) View of Mount Isarog • Caramoan National Park • Peñafrancia Basilica • Naga Metropolitan Cathedral • View of Lake Buhi • Our Lady of Peñafrancia Shrine in Naga City

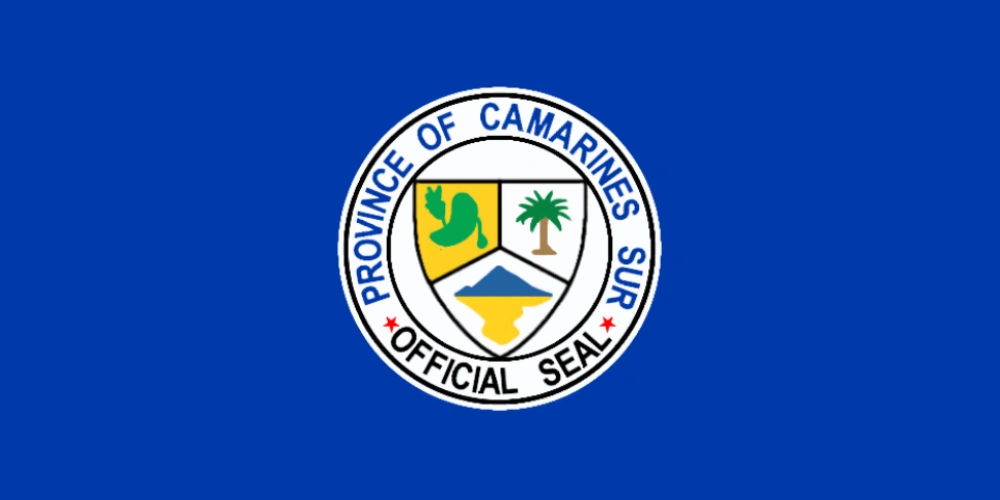
- Flag Seal
- Anthem: Camarines Sur March
- Location in the Philippines
- Interactive map of Camarines Sur
- Coordinates: 13°40′N 123°20′E
- Country: Philippines
- Region: Bicol Region
- Founded (Separated from Ambos Camarines): March 19, 1919
- Capital: Pili; 13°33′15″N 123°16′31″E
- Largest city: Naga*; 13°37′12″N 123°10′12″E

Government
  - Governor: Luis Raymund F. Villafuerte Jr. (NUP)
  - Vice Governor: Salvio Patrick Edmund F. Fortuno Jr. (NUP)
  - Legislature: Camarines Sur Provincial Board
  - Electorate: 1,344,062 voters (2025)

Area
  - Total: 5,497.03 km^{2} (2,122.42 sq mi)
  - Rank: 16th out of 82
- Highest elevation (Mount Isarog): 2,011.7 m (6,600 ft)

Population (2024 census)
  - Total: 2,063,314
  - Rank: 11th out of 82
  - Density: 375.351/km^{2} (972.154/sq mi)
  - Rank: 19th out of 82
  - Households: 455,276
- Includes highly urbanized city
- Demonyms: Camarinesnon; Camarinesense

Divisions
  - Independent cities: 1: Naga*
  - Component cities: 1: Iriga
  - Municipalities: 35: Baao; Balatan; Bato; Bombon; Buhi; Bula; Cabusao; Calabanga; Camaligan; Canaman; Caramoan; Del Gallego; Gainza; Garchitorena; Goa; Lagonoy; Libmanan; Lupi; Magarao; Milaor; Minalabac; Nabua; Ocampo; Pamplona; Pasacao; Pili; Presentacion; Ragay; Sagñay; San Fernando; San Jose; Sipocot; Siruma; Tigaon; Tinambac
  - Barangays: 1,036; including independent cities: 1,063
  - Districts: Legislative districts of Camarines Sur (shared with Naga City)

Economy
  - Income class: 1st provincial income class
  - Poverty incidence: 22.4% (2023)
  - Revenue: ₱ 4,822 million (2024)
  - Assets: ₱ 33,229 million (2024)
  - Expenditure: ₱ 4,410 million (2024)
  - Liabilities: ₱ 4,667 million (2024)
- Time zone: UTC+8 (PST)
- PSGC: 051700000
- IDD : area code: +63 (0)54
- ISO 3166 code: PH-CAS
- Spoken languages: Central Bikol; Rinconada Bikol; Albay Bikol; Tagalog; English; Manide
- Website: camarinessur.gov.ph
- * Naga is a highly-urbanized city, politically independent from Camarines Sur.

Camarines Sur (Central Bikol: Habagatan na Camarines; Tagalog: Timog Camarines), officially the Province of Camarines Sur (Bikol: Probinsya kan Habagatan na Camarines; Tagalog: Lalawigan ng Timog Camarines), is a province in the Philippines located in the Bicol Region in the island of Luzon. Its capital is Pili and the province borders Camarines Norte and Quezon to the northwest, and Albay to the south. To the east lies the island province of Catanduanes across the Maqueda Channel.

Camarines Sur is the largest among the six provinces in the Bicol Region both by population and land area. Its territory includes two cities: Naga, the most-populous, lone chartered and independent city, as the province's religious, cultural, financial, commercial, industrial and business center; and Iriga, a component city, as the center of the Rinconada area and Riŋkonāda Language. Within the province lies Lake Buhi, where the smallest commercially harvested fish, the sinarapan (Mistichthys luzonensis), can be found. The province is also home to the critically endangered Isarog Agta language, one of the three critically endangered languages in the Philippines according to UNESCO. The province is home to historic churches and landmarks reflecting its Spanish colonial past. The Peñafrancia Festival held every September is a significant religious event attracting thousands of pilgrims. The province is also home to indigenous communities such as the Agta whose traditions contribute to the region's unique cultural tapestry

== History ==
=== Early history ===
The earliest settlers in Camarines Sur are the Isarog Agta people who live within the circumference of Mount Isarog and the Iraya Agta who live within the circumference of Mount Iraya. They have been in the province for thousands of years and have been one of the first settlers in the entire Philippines.

=== Spanish occupation ===
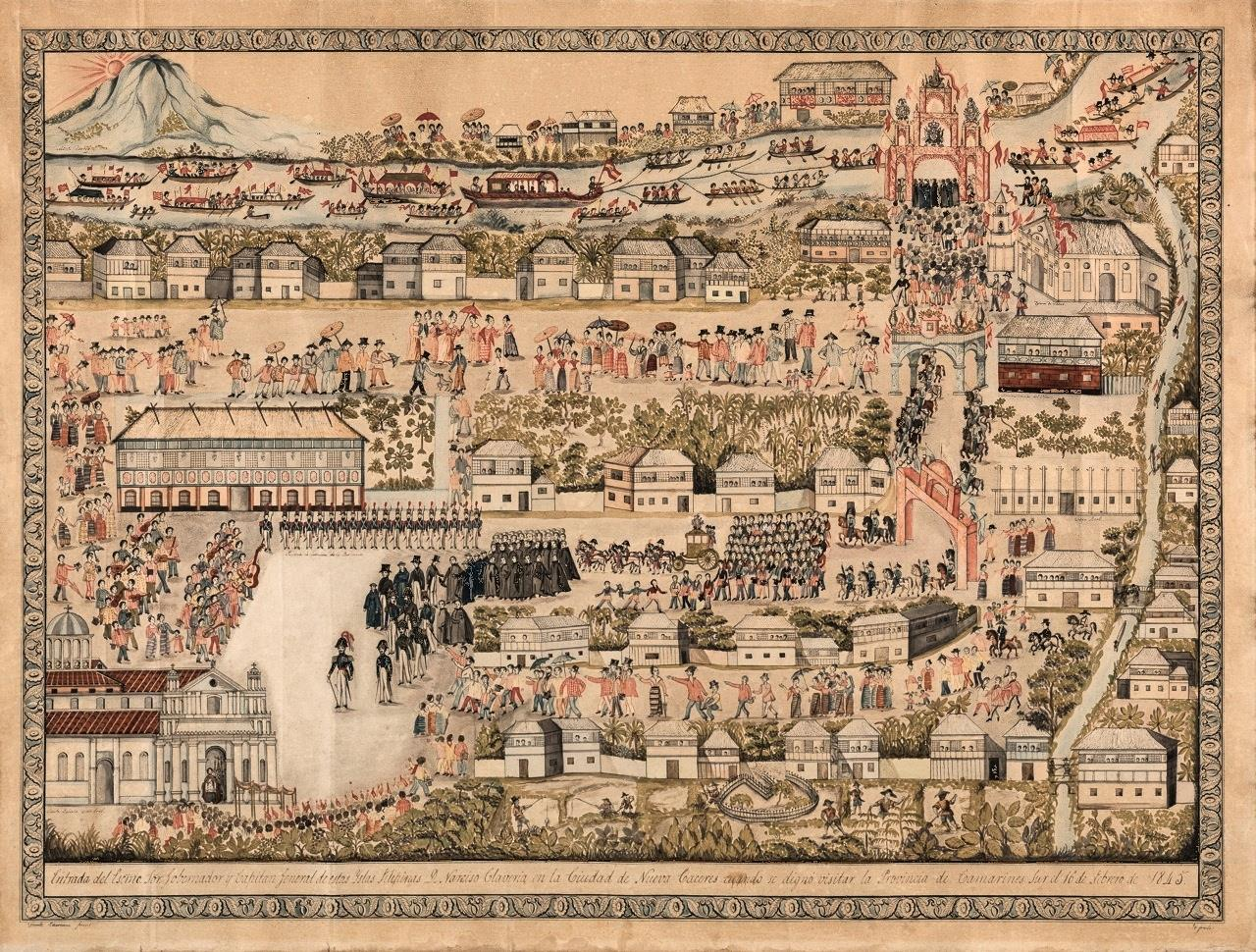
Naga City, Camarines Sur 1845

In July 1569, Luis Enríquez de Guzmán, a member of the expedition led by Maestro de Campo Mateo de Saz and Captain Martín de Goiti, led a group which crossed from Burias and Ticao islands and landed on a coastal settlement called Ibalon in what is now the province of Sorsogon. From this point another expedition was sent to explore the interior and founded the town of Camalig.

In 1573, Spanish conquistador Juan de Salcedo penetrated the Bicol Peninsula from the north as made it as far south as Libon, establishing the settlement of Santiago de Libon. José María de Peñaranda, the first governor of Albay and a military engineer, was made corregidor of the province on 14 May 1834. He constructed public buildings and built roads and bridges. The entire Bicol Peninsula was organized as one province with two divisions, Camarines in the northwest and Ibalon in the southeast. In 1636, the two were separated.

Known centuries ago as the Tierra de Camarines, the province is distinctly Spanish-founded settlement. Its name having been derived from camaronchones or camarines, a Spanish word for kamalig referring to small nipa or bamboo-made huts by the natives.

In 1574, Governor-General Guido de Lavezaris referred Camarines Sur to the King of Spain as Los Camarines, after the abundance of camarins-rice granaries – which were conspicuous features of the area.

Spanish colonizers later subjugated its people and denominated the area into two distinct aggrupations. Partido de Camarines was partitioned into Camarines Sur and Camarines Norte in 1829, and thereafter underwent fusion, annexations and re-partitions until 19 March 1919, when two provinces, jointly called Ambos Camarines, were finally separated with their present boundaries by decree of the First Philippine Legislature. Before that, under Spanish rule, when both provinces were still united, Camarines Sur occupied all lands to the south of Camarines Norte which once belonged to undivided Camarines, of which the number of Spanish-Filipino families and their residences are as follows: 59 at Camalig, 24 at Ligao, 15 at Polangui, and 1 at Libon; all being under the Partido de Iriga, then; 10 at Buhi, 2 at Nabua, and 57 at Bao; all being under the Partido de la Binconada, and finally; 2 in San Fernando, 7 in Milaor, 1 in Libmanan, and 301 Spanish-Filipino families in Nueva Caceres, or modern day Naga City. Camarines Sur also has an additional 485 Spanish-Filipino Mestizo tributes or families.

The Philippine Revolution started in Ambos Camarines when Elías Ángeles and Félix Plazo, Filipino corporals in the Spanish Army, sided with revolutionists and fought the local Spanish forces on 17 September 1898. Governor Vicente Zaidín capitulated to the revolutionists on the following day. With the arrival of General Vicente Lukbán, the revolutionary government in the Bicol Region was established.

=== American occupation ===
The American forces occupied the Bicol Peninsula in January 1900. In March of the same year. General John M. Bell was made the military governor of the southeastern Luzon. Civil government was finally established in Ambos Camarines in April 1901.

=== Japanese occupation ===
During World War II, Camarines Sur came under Japanese occupation in late December 1941, following the capture of Naga on 18 December, a few days after the Japanese invasion of Legaspi. Guerrilla units were organized by Wenceslao Q. Vinzons that waged underground operations against the Japanese troops stationed in Camarines Sur. After the capture of Vinzons on 8 July 1942, the guerrilla movement was carried on by Lieutenant Francisco Boayes and by the Tangcong Vaca Guerrilla Unit organized by Elías Madrid, Juan Miranda and León Aureus in San Nicolás, Canaman. In April 1945, Camarines Sur was finally liberated from the Japanese invaders against the combined Filipino and American troops.

The military general headquarters and military camp bases of the Philippine Commonwealth Army were active from 3 January 1942 until 30 June 1946, and the Philippine Constabulary was active from 28 October 1944 to 30 June 1946, in Camarines Sur. The Filipino soldiers of the Philippine Commonwealth Army and Philippine Constabulary were spearheading the local military special operations in Bicol Region with the Bicolano guerrilla units decisively aiding them.

=== Philippine Independence ===
==== Transfer of provincial capital ====
On 6 June 1955, the provincial capital, which had previously been located in Naga, was transferred to Pili by virtue of Republic Act 1336.

=== Urban history ===
Camarines Sur had urban areas since the Spanish Colonial Period with Naga City (or Nueva Caceres) becoming urban in the 19th century due to it being the center of commerce in the former province of Ambos Camarines. Nabua (Which formerly included present day Balatan), Libmanan (Then included present day Cabusao and some barangays of Canaman Pamplona and Pasacao), Sipocot, Pili, Calabanga, Iriga then followed Nueva Caceres with some barangays being classified as urban.

By the late 1990s the remaining rural municipalities were Siruma, Garchitorena, Presentacion and Cabusao. Until 2007 when all of these 4 municipalities were classified as urban by the National Statistics Office.

== Geography ==
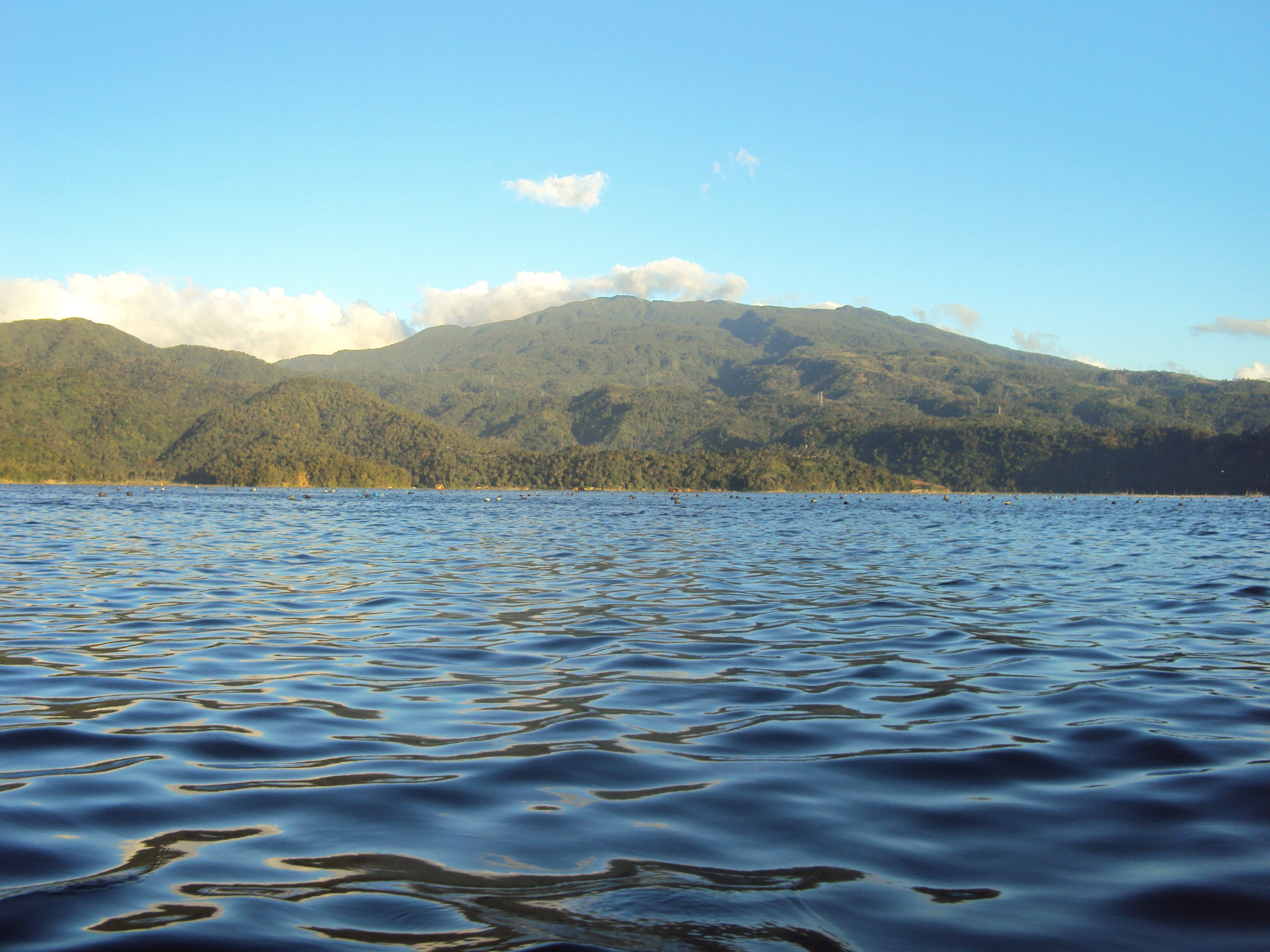
Lake Buhi in the town of Buhi

Camarines Sur covers a total area of 5,497.03 square kilometres (2,122 sq mi) occupying the central section of the Bicol Region in Luzon. The province borders Camarines Norte and Quezon to the northwest, and Albay to the south. To the east lies the Maqueda Channel. Camarines Sur is home to five (5) out of eleven (11) declared natural parks in Bicol Region (Region V), namely Bicol Natural Park between the borders of Camarines Sur and Camarines Norte, Buhi Wildlife Sanctuary, Lagonoy Natural Biotic Area, Malabungot Protected Landscape in Caramoan, Camarines Sur, and Mount Isarog Natural Park, totaling 17,769.23 hectares.

=== Terrain ===
Camarines Sur occupies the central section of the Bicol Peninsula. With a land area of 5,266.8 square kilometres (2,034 sq mi), it is the largest province in the Bicol Region. At the center of the province is the Bicol Plain, surrounded by mountains which include Mount Bernacci (Tangcong Vaca), Mount Isarog and Mount Iriga. The eastern portion of the province lies on the mountainous Caramoan Peninsula, which faces the island of Catanduanes to the east.

The Bicol River drains the central and southern parts of the province into the San Miguel Bay. Mount Asog is surrounded by three lakes: Buhi, Bato, and Baao.

=== Climate ===
The climate in Camarines Sur, like most of the rest of the country, is very tropical. It is dry from March to May and wet the rest of the year Annual average rainfall is 2,565 millimetres (101 in). Camarines Sur has an average temperature of 27.0 °C (80.6 °F) and a relative humidity of 25.8%, based from Aera Tranquilo.

=== Administrative divisions ===
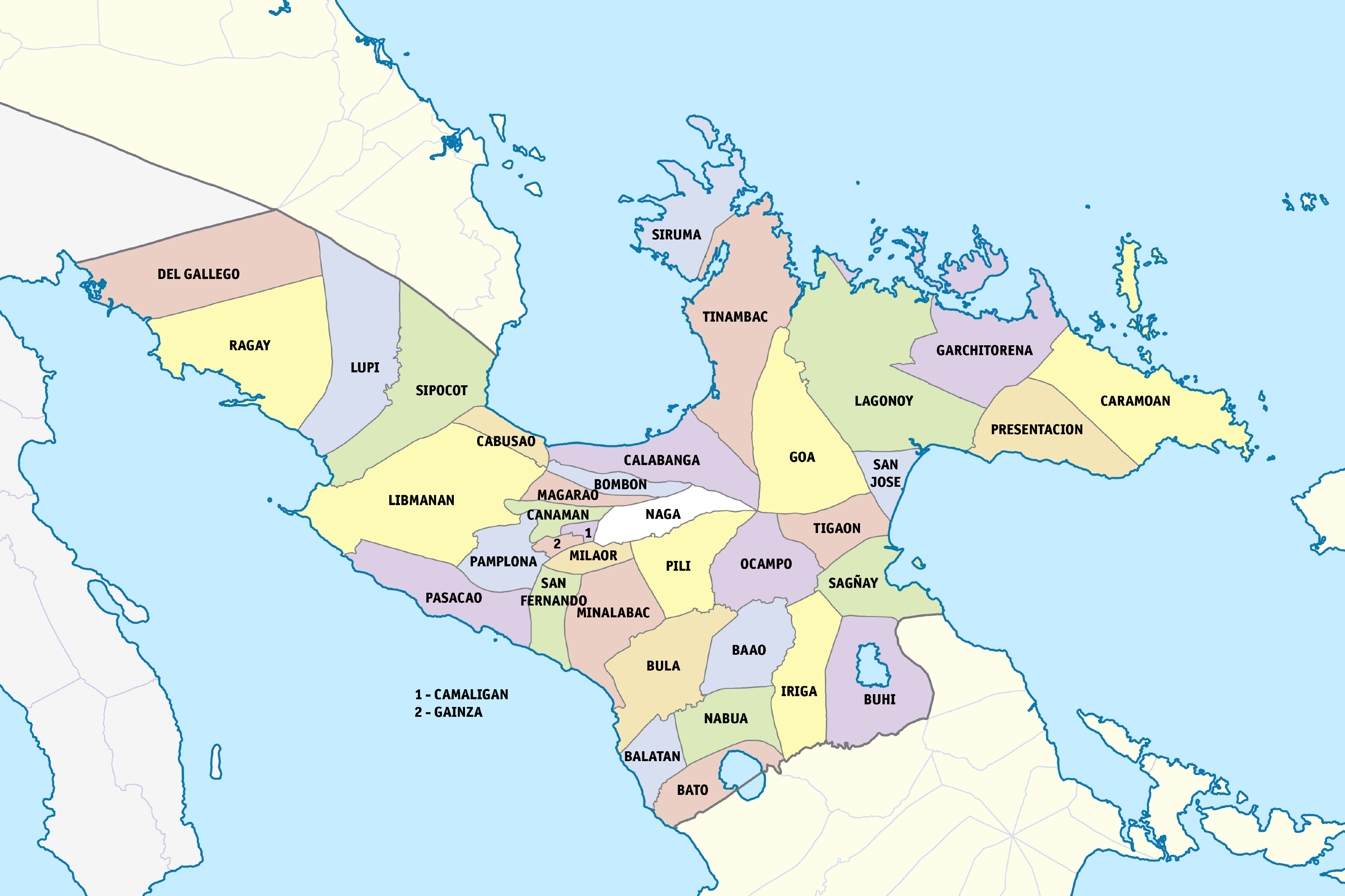
Political map of Camarines Sur

Camarines Sur comprises into 2 cities and 35 municipalities.

- † Capital municipality
- ∗ Component city
- Municipality
- ^ Highly urbanized city (geographically within but outside of provincial jurisdiction)

City or municipality		District	Population			±% p.a.	Area		Density		Barangay	Coordinates^{[A]}
			(2020)		(2015)		km^{2}	sq mi	/km^{2}	/sq mi		
Baao		5th	3.0%	61,493	58,849	+0.84%	106.63	41.17	580	1,500	30	13°27′29″N 123°21′39″E
Balatan		5th	1.5%	30,669	30,922	−0.16%	93.09	35.94	330	850	17	13°19′00″N 123°14′00″E
Bato		5th	2.5%	52,155	52,137	+0.01%	107.12	41.36	490	1,300	33	13°21′26″N 123°22′04″E
Bombon		3rd	0.9%	17,995	16,512	+1.65%	28.73	11.09	630	1,600	8	13°41′11″N 123°11′59″E
Buhi		5th	3.9%	81,306	77,143	+1.01%	246.65	95.23	330	850	38	13°26′03″N 123°30′59″E
Bula		5th	3.5%	73,143	69,430	+1.00%	167.64	64.73	440	1,100	33	13°28′13″N 123°16′48″E
Cabusao		1st	0.9%	19,257	18,397	+0.87%	46.80	18.07	410	1,100	9	13°43′33″N 123°06′48″E
Calabanga		3rd	4.3%	88,906	83,033	+1.31%	163.80	63.24	540	1,400	48	13°42′30″N 123°13′00″E
Camaligan		3rd	1.2%	25,036	24,109	+0.72%	4.68	1.81	5,300	14,000	13	13°37′14″N 123°09′49″E
Canaman		3rd	1.8%	36,205	34,210	+1.09%	43.27	16.71	840	2,200	24	13°38′51″N 123°10′14″E
Caramoan		4th	2.5%	51,728	47,605	+1.59%	276.00	106.56	190	490	49	13°46′13″N 123°51′47″E
Del Gallego		1st	1.3%	26,403	25,397	+0.74%	208.31	80.43	130	340	32	13°55′18″N 122°35′45″E
Gainza		2nd	0.6%	11,584	11,262	+0.54%	14.75	5.70	790	2,000	8	13°36′47″N 123°07′52″E
Garchitorena		4th	1.4%	29,436	27,010	+1.65%	243.80	94.13	120	310	23	13°52′56″N 123°41′55″E
Goa		4th	3.5%	71,368	63,308	+2.31%	206.18	79.61	350	910	34	13°41′59″N 123°29′24″E
Iriga City	∗	5th	5.5%	114,457	111,757	+0.46%	137.35	53.03	830	2,100	36	13°25′20″N 123°24′46″E
Lagonoy		4th	2.7%	56,714	55,465	+0.42%	377.90	145.91	150	390	38	13°44′16″N 123°31′16″E
Libmanan		2nd	5.5%	112,994	108,716	+0.74%	359.80	138.92	310	800	75	13°41′38″N 123°03′43″E
Lupi		1st	1.6%	33,897	32,167	+1.00%	199.12	76.88	170	440	38	13°47′22″N 122°54′32″E
Magarao		3rd	1.3%	26,742	25,694	+0.76%	44.97	17.36	590	1,500	15	13°39′36″N 123°10′48″E
Milaor		2nd	1.6%	33,963	31,150	+1.66%	33.64	12.99	1,000	2,600	20	13°35′49″N 123°10′50″E
Minalabac		2nd	2.6%	53,981	52,390	+0.57%	126.10	48.69	430	1,100	25	13°34′15″N 123°11′06″E
Nabua		5th	4.2%	86,490	83,874	+0.59%	96.20	37.14	900	2,300	42	13°24′27″N 123°22′24″E
Naga	^	3rd	10.1%	209,170	196,003	+1.25%	77.40	29.88	2,700	7,000	27	13°37′26″N 123°11′06″E
Ocampo		3rd	2.5%	51,073	45,934	+2.04%	118.33	45.69	430	1,100	25	13°33′49″N 123°22′21″E
Pamplona		2nd	1.9%	39,333	36,390	+1.49%	80.60	31.12	490	1,300	17	13°35′31″N 123°04′57″E
Pasacao		2nd	2.6%	53,461	49,035	+1.66%	149.54	57.74	360	930	19	13°30′35″N 123°02′39″E
Pili	†	3rd	4.8%	99,196	89,545	+1.97%	126.25	48.75	790	2,000	26	13°33′15″N 123°16′29″E
Presentacion		4th	1.1%	22,591	20,996	+1.40%	143.80	55.52	160	410	18	13°42′38″N 123°44′38″E
Ragay		1st	2.9%	59,770	58,214	+0.50%	400.22	154.53	150	390	38	13°49′12″N 122°47′28″E
Sagñay		4th	1.8%	36,841	34,546	+1.23%	154.76	59.75	240	620	19	13°36′18″N 123°31′04″E
San Fernando		2nd	1.9%	38,626	35,258	+1.75%	71.76	27.71	540	1,400	22	13°33′50″N 123°08′37″E
San Jose		4th	2.1%	43,973	40,623	+1.52%	48.04	18.55	920	2,400	29	13°42′12″N 123°31′01″E
Sipocot		1st	3.3%	68,169	64,855	+0.95%	243.43	93.99	280	730	46	13°46′02″N 122°58′32″E
Siruma		4th	0.9%	19,419	17,764	+1.71%	141.27	54.54	140	360	22	14°01′20″N 123°15′35″E
Tigaon		4th	2.9%	60,524	55,272	+1.74%	72.35	27.93	840	2,200	23	13°37′59″N 123°29′41″E
Tinambac		4th	3.4%	70,176	67,572	+0.72%	351.62	135.76	200	520	44	13°49′08″N 123°19′36″E
Total^{[B]}				2,068,244	1,952,544	+1.10%	5,511.90	2,128.16	380	980	1,063	(see GeoGroup box)
1. Coordinates mark the city/town center, and are sortable by latitude.; 2. Total figures included the former independent component city of Naga, as of 2015 and 2020 census. As now a "highly urbanized city", its population will be excluded in the next census.

== Demographics ==
The population of Camarines Sur in the 2024 census was 2,063,314 people, with a density of 380 inhabitants per square kilometre or 980 inhabitants per square mile.

During the May 2010 census, there were 1,822,371 residents in Camarines Sur, making it the most populous in the region. The census also stated that Camarines Sur had 288,172 households with an average household size of 5.37 persons, significantly higher than the national average of 4.99. The annual growth rate was 1.86%, much lower than the national growth rate of 2.36%. This rate of growth will double the population of Camarines Sur in 8 years.

Population census of Camarines Sur

Year	Pop.	±% p.a.
1903	193,902	—
1918	218,733	+0.81%
1939	385,695	+2.74%
1948	553,691	+4.10%
1960	819,565	+3.32%
1970	948,436	+1.47%

Year	Pop.	±% p.a.
1975	1,023,819	+1.55%
1980	1,099,346	+1.43%
1990	1,305,919	+1.74%
1995	1,432,598	+1.75%
2000	1,551,549	+1.72%
2007	1,693,821	+1.22%

Year	Pop.	±% p.a.
2010	1,822,371	+2.70%
2015	1,952,544	+1.32%
2020	2,068,244	+1.22%
2024	2,063,314	−0.06%

Source: Philippine Statistics Authority

=== Religion ===
Prior to colonization, the region had a complex religious system which involved various deities. Among these deities include:

- Gugurang, the supreme god who dwells inside of Mount Mayon where he guards and protects the sacred fire in which Asuang, his brother was trying to steal. Whenever people disobey his orders or commit numerous sins, he would cause Mount Mayon to burst lava as a sign of warning for people to mend their crooked ways. Ancient Bikolanos had a rite performed for him called Atang.
- Asuang, the evil god who always tries to steal the sacred fire of Mount Mayón from his brother, Gugurang. Addressed sometimes as Aswang, he dwells mainly inside Mount Malinao. As an evil god, he would cause the people to suffer misfortunes and commit sins. Enemy of Gugurang and a friend of Bulan, the god of the moon.
- Haliya, the masked goddess of the moonlight and protector of Bulan and the arch-enemy of Bakunawa. Her cult is composed primarily of women. There is also a ritual dance named after her as it is performed to be a counter-measure against Bakunawa.
- Bulan, the god of the pale moon, he is depicted as a pubescent boy with uncommon comeliness that made savage beast and the vicious mermaids (Magindara) tame. He has deep affection towards the sea god Magindang, but plays with him by running away so that Magindang would never catch him. The reason for this is because he is shy to the man that he loves. If Magindang manages to catch Bulan, Haliya always comes to free him from Magindang's grip.
- Magindang, the god of the sea and all its creatures. He has deep affection to the lunar god Bulan and pursues him despite never catching him. Due to this, the Bicolanos reasoned that it is to why the waves rise to reach the Moon when seen from the distant horizon. Whenever he does catch up to Bulan, Haliya comes to rescue Bulan and free him immediately.
- Bakunawa, a gigantic sea serpent deity who is often considered as the cause of eclipses, the devourer of the Sun and the Moon, and an adversary of Haliya as Bakunawa's main aim is to swallow Bulan, who Haliya swore to protect for all of eternity.
- Okot, god of forest and hunting.

==== Catholicism ====
The religion of the province is predominantly Roman Catholicism followed by 93% of the population, one of the highest in the entire Philippines, including Philippine-based catholic Iglesia Filipina Independiente or Aglipayan Church.

==== Others ====
Other religions professed by the people include Iglesia Ni Cristo (INC) the Province of Camarines Sur has 2 Ecclesiastical District of the Church 1.Iriga 2.Naga serves the increasing numbers, Baptist, The Church of Jesus Christ of Latter-day Saints (Mormons), Jehovah's Witnesses, Methodists and other smaller Christian groups. Islam is also present in the province with their mosques stood in large population areas. Sikhism and Taoism is present in the province as well. Some do not practice religion or identify as Agnostic.

=== Languages ===
The main languages spoken in Camarines Sur are the Coastal Bikol (especially Central Bikol) and Inland Bikol group of languages. The latter is a group of languages that includes Albay Bikol group and Rinconada Bikol, while the former just consists dialects.

==== Coastal Bikol (Central Bikol) ====
A dialect of Coastal Bikol, called Coastal Bikol-Partido is used in the eastern portion of the province around Lagonoy Gulf, and another dialect called Coastal Bikol-Central is spoken around Naga City.

The Canaman dialect of Central Bikol variant of Coastal Bikol spoken in Canaman, Camarines Sur is said to be the "purest" form of Bikol (according to Jesuit anthropologist Frank Lynch, S.J.), though most linguists just consider it as the standard form of Central Bikol language since other Coastal Bikol languages, Rinconada Bikol and Buhinon (both Inland Bikol) are separate languages.

==== Rinconada Bikol ====
The Rinconada Bikol also known as Riŋkonāda (under the umbrella of Inland Bikol group of languages), is used by most people in the Rinconada area or district of the province especially in Nabua, Iriga City and by people of Rinconada in diaspora. Buhinon (one of the languages of Albay Bikol group, another member of Inland Bikol), is a minority language spoken in the town of Buhi and around Lake Buhi. Most inhabitants of Camarines Sur understand Tagalog and English.

==== Isarog Agta ====
In 2010, UNESCO released its 3rd world volume of Endangered Languages in the World, where 3 critically endangered languages were in the Philippines. One of these languages in the Isarog Agta language which has an estimated 5 speakers in the year 2000. The language was classified as Critically Endangered, meaning the youngest speakers are grandparents and older, and they speak the language partially and infrequently and hardly pass the language to their children and grandchildren anymore. If the remaining 150 people do not pass their native language to the next generation of Isarog Agta people, their indigenous language will be extinct within a period of 1 to 2 decades.

The Isarog Agta people live within the circumference of Mount Isarog, though only 5 of them still know their indigenous language. They are one of the original Negrito settlers in the entire Philippines. They belong to the Aeta people classification, but have distinct language and belief systems unique to their own culture and heritage.

== Economy ==
Poverty incidence of Camarines Sur (%)

Source: Philippine Statistics Authority

The economy of Camarines Sur is mostly agriculture-based. 29 of the 35 towns are agricultural and produce rice, corn, feedmeal, freshwater fish, livestock, coconut, sugar, abacá, and water-lily.

Entrepreneurs engage in trading, often branching out towards neighboring provinces in the south as local demand might be limited by the 3rd to 5th income-class municipalities. Handicrafts are the major source of rural income, providing a fairly large share in the small-scale industries of the province. Forestry and papermaking are other sources of livelihood. The manufacture of abacá products such as Manila hemp, hats, bags, mats, and slippers is one of the main sources of income in the rural areas. Fishing is also done along both shores of the province. Tourism, primarily because of Caramoan and Mount Isarog, also generates income for Camarines Sur.

Naga and several towns have a tri-economy or three-base economy: commerce, industry, and agriculture. As the main center in the Bicol Region, all of the products from other provinces in the region are brought to Naga. It has four major industries: the manufacture of jewelry and gifts/toys/housewares, and processing of pineapple and coconut. Naga also has vast cornfields, rice fields, and water lily farms all over the city.

Calabanga, Cabusao, Libmanan and Sipocot have similar economies to Naga City. Calabanga has commerce from goods moving out of Naga, and is the trade center for the towns of Tinambac, Bombon, Cabusao, and Siruma and further Mercedes in Camarines Norte. Calabanga also has fishing from the Quipayo Fishing Center (the largest in Bicol), and vast productions of corn, sugar, and rice, which benefit from a large granary. Libmanan has 156 hectares of ricefields and cornfields, and fishing along its coastline connecting the towns of Ragay and Pasacao; Libmanan also has a commercial district. Sipocot has an agricultural base economy, with an abundant stock of native chicken (Sipocot's OTOP) and wide production of calamansi and other vegetables, while also serving as trading post for towns of Cabusao, Lupi, Del Gallego, Libmanan Ragay and Mercedes (Camarines Norte) Tagkawayan (Quezon Province) . Fish products from these towns are received by Sipocot. Other towns not mentioned have a fishing industry as the main base of their economy.

Naga City, Iriga City, and Pili are the main economic centers of Camarines Sur.

The towns of Nabua, Goa, Calabanga, Libmanan, Pasacao, Sipocot, Baao are also taking successful steps towards urbanization and competitiveness.

Milaor, Camaligan, Canaman, Magarao, Gainza serves as a sub-urban area of Naga City.

The rest of the province takes a long time to urbanize due to lack of major roads, or isolation from business centers.

== Tourist attractions ==
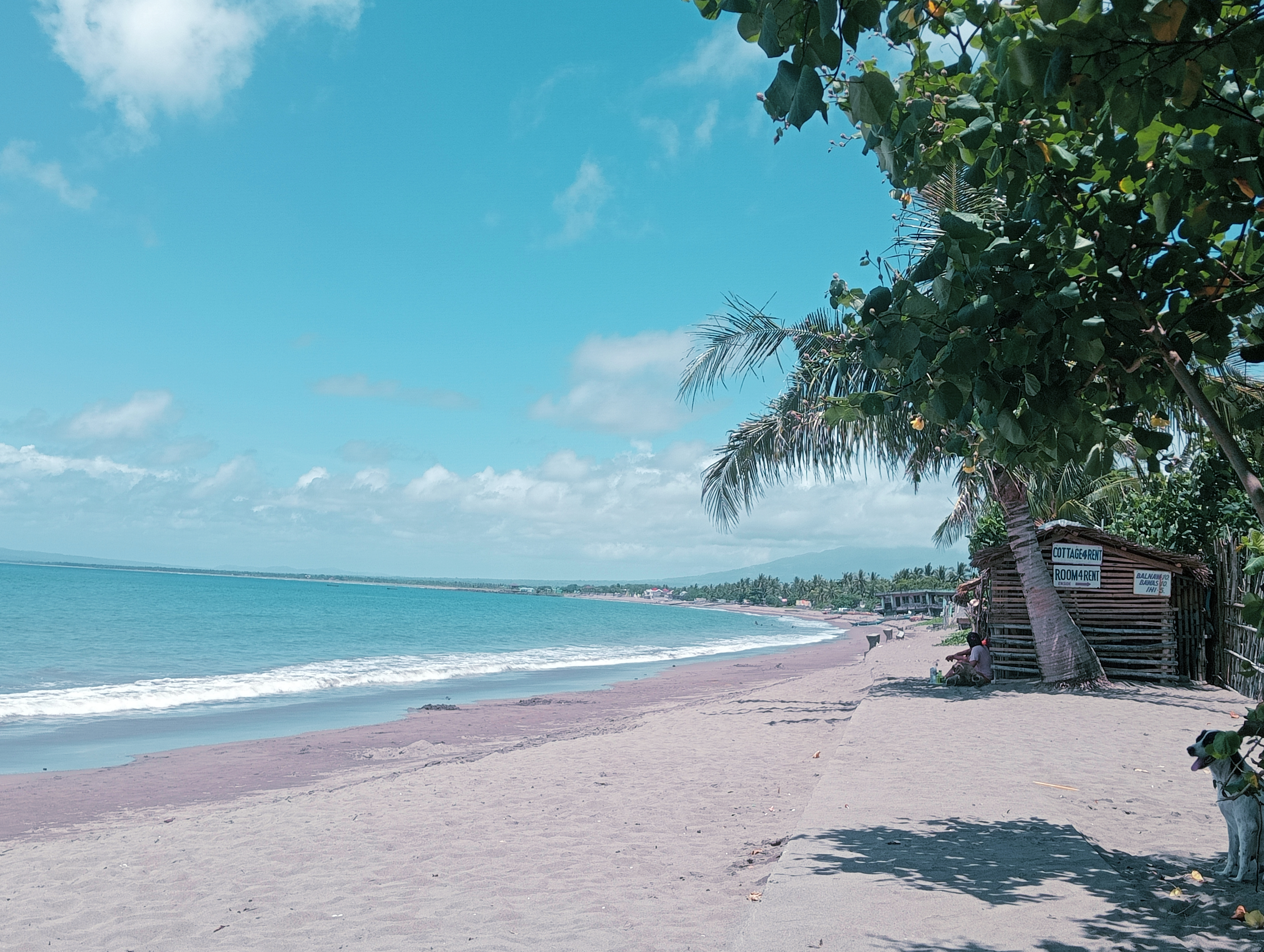
- Sabang Beach in San Jose town
  19th-century churches – There are a number of century-old churches in Goa, San Jose, and Sagñay.
- Our Lady of Peñafrancia Church – Completed in 1750, this two-century-old church is a site of pilgrimage located in Naga.
- Lake Buhi – Created by volcanic activity, this isolated lake is famous for unique organisms including the world's smallest commercially harvested fish.
- Mount Isarog and Mount Asog – Two potentially active volcanoes with hiking trails to explore rich biodiversity.
- Beaches of Sagñay, Sabang (Partido) and Caramoan – These black and white sand beaches are shielded by coral reefs.
- Pasacao – Known for its beaches as "the Summer Capital of Cam Sur".

== Government ==
Current Provincial Government Officials (2025-2028)

- Governor: Luis Raymund F. Villafuerte (NUP)
- Vice-Governor: Salvio Patrick Edmund F. Fortuno (NUP)

Sangguniang Panlalawigan Members:

1st District:

- Warren A. Señar (NUP)

2nd District:

- Sofia Charis N. Hernandez (NUP)
- Darius S. Nopra (NUP)

3rd District:

- Vanessa DR. Señar (NUP)
- John Apollo S. Manaog (NUP)

4th District:

- Gerard F. Pilapil (NPC)
- Emmanuel F. Llaguno (NPC)

5th District:

- Donna Ann R. Oñate (NUP)
- Jesha Aina F. Noble (NUP)
- Regin Oliver N. Oliva (NUP)

Ex-Officio Members:

- Christopher Jacinto (President, Liga ng mga Barangay)
- TBD (President, PCL)
- Justmine San Buenaventura (President, Panlalawigang Pederasyon ng Sangguniang Kabataan)

=== House of Representatives ===
District	Representative	Party	Term	Bloc
1st	Tsuyoshi Anthony G. Horibata	NUP	2	Majority
2nd	Vicenzo Renato Luigi R. Villafuerte	NUP	1	Majority
3rd	Nelson S. Legacion	NPC	1	Majority
4th	Arnulf Bryan B. Fuentebella	NPC	3	Majority
5th	Miguel Luis R. Villafuerte	NUP	2	Majority

== Infrastructure ==
=== Road transportation ===
The Pan-Philippine Highway (N1/AH26) is the highway backbone network. Secondary and tertiary roads interconnect most cities and municipalities in Sipocot, Libmanan, Pamplona, San Fernando, Milaor, Naga City, Pili, Bula, Baao, Iriga City, Nabua before ending at Bato.

In order to spur development in the province, two expressways in Camarines Sur have been proposed:

- The Toll Regulatory Board declared Toll Road 5 the extension of South Luzon Expressway. A 420-kilometer, four-lane expressway starting from the terminal point of the now under construction SLEX Toll Road 4 at Barangay Mayao, Lucena City in Quezon to Matnog, Sorsogon, near the Matnog Ferry Terminal. On August 25, 2020, San Miguel Corporation announced that they will invest the project which will reduce travel time from Lucena to Matnog from 9 hours to 5.5 hours.
- The other expressway to serve Camarines Sur is the Quezon-Bicol Expressway, which will link between Lucena and San Fernando, Camarines Sur.

== Notable people ==
- Jorge Barlin - First native Filipino bishop (Baao)
- Joaquin G. Bernas - Lawyer, Jesuit priest, constitutional law scholar, writer and newspaper columnist (Baao)
- Luis Dato - writer, poet and educator (Baao)
- Joker P. Arroyo - lawyer, politician and Senator (Baao)
- Beatriz Saw - Pinoy Big Brother Season 2 Big Winner, actress (Baao)
- Venus Raj - Binibining Pilipinas-Universe 2010 and placed 4th Runner-Up in Miss Universe 2010 pageant (Bato)
- Victor Wood - singer, actor, politician (Buhi)
- Elaine Kay Moll - Binibining Pilipinas candidate (Buhi)
- Suzette Doctolero - drama screenwriter (Calabanga)
- Rez Cortez - actor (Canaman)
- Leila de Lima - former Senator (Iriga)
- Jaime Fabregas - actor, singer and musical director (Iriga)
- Nora Aunor - actress and singer (Iriga)
- Lianne Valentin - actress and television presenter (Iriga)
- Pedro B. Escuro - National Scientist of the Philippines for Genetics and Plant Breeding (Nabua)
- Christi McGarry - Filipino-American beauty queen and model (Nabua)
- Sofia Moran - actress, model, recording artist and philanthropist (Nabua)
- Elizabeth Oropesa - actress and beauty queen (Nabua)
- Ofelia M. Samar-Sy - Physician, Dean of Bicol University College of Medicine (Nabua)
- Andrew E - singer and rapper (Naga)
- Johnny Abarrientos - basketball player and coach.
- Tomás Arejola - lawyer, legislator, diplomat, political writer and a propagandist during the Spanish colonial period (Naga)
- Joker Arroyo – politician
- Wally Bayola - comedian, actor, and host (Naga)
- Ely Buendia - singer, frontman of Eraserheads and Pupil (Naga)
- Jose Fabian Cadiz - politician and vice mayor of Marikina.
- Arnold Clavio - news anchor
- AJ Dee - actor and swimmer (Naga)
- Enchong Dee - actor and swimmer (Naga)
- Amalia Fuentes - actress (Naga)
- Victor Dennis T. Nierva – poet, teacher, journalist, theatre actor, translator, graphic and book designer (Naga)
- Salvador Panelo - former spokesman and chief legal counsel of President Rodrigo Duterte (Naga)
- Jesse Robredo - former Secretary of the Interior and Local Government
- Leni Robredo - wife of Jesse Robredo, Mayor of Naga & 14th Vice President of the Philippines (Naga)
- Raul Roco - senator (Naga)
- Tecla San Andres Ziga - senator (Naga)
- Adolfo Tito Yllana - Apostolic Nuncio to Israel and Cyprus, and Apostolic Delegate to Jerusalem and Palestine (Naga)
- Kyline Alcantara - actress (Ocampo)
- Annie Ramirez - ju-jitsu practitioner (Pamplona)
- Imelda Papin - OPM singer (Presentacion)
- Andrés Garchitorena - Governor and revolutionary general (Tigaon)
- Mariano Garchitorena - Governor and Secretary of Agriculture and Commerce (Tigaon)
- Francis E. Garchitorena - Sandiganbayan Justice (Tigaon)
- Jomari Yllana and Anjo Yllana - actors (Tigaon)
- José Manuel Stilianopoulos - Ambassador to the United Kingdom (Tigaon)
- Carmelle Collado - singer and first winner of Eurovision Song Contest Asia (Sipocot)
- Bugoy Drilon - singer, songwriter, and recording artist (Ocampo)
- Allen Ansay - actor, model, and singer (Sagñay)

== See also ==
- List of Bicol Region Cities and Municipalities
