= Buhi =

Buhi can mean:

- Buhi, Camarines Sur, Philippines
  - The Buhi'non Bikol language spoken in Buhi
- Lake Buhi, Philippines
- BuHi, nickname for the Buford Highway community near Atlanta, Georgia, United States
