= Maqueda Channel =

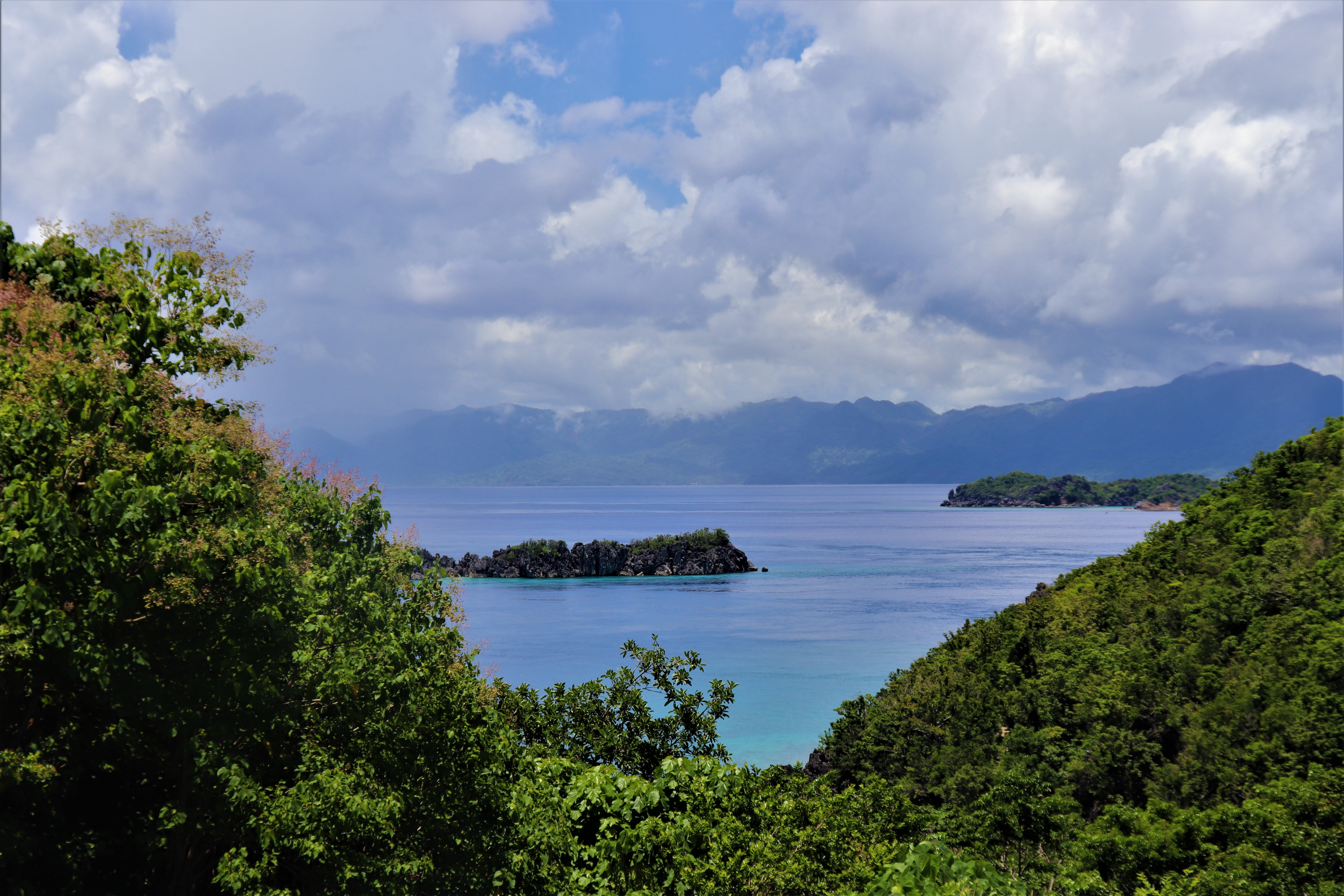
- Maqueda Channel as seen from Caramoan, Camarines Sur

- Location within Catanduanes Maqueda Channel (Luzon) Maqueda Channel (Philippines)
- Location: Bicol Region, Philippines
- Coordinates: 13°42′00″N 124°1′0.12″E
- Type: strait

The Maqueda Channel is a strait in the Philippines, eastern side, separating the island of Catanduanes from the Caramoan Peninsula in the Bicol Region of Luzon. The strait connects Lagonoy Gulf and the Philippine Sea.

== See also ==
- Maqueda Channel
