= Lake Baao =

Lake in The Philippines

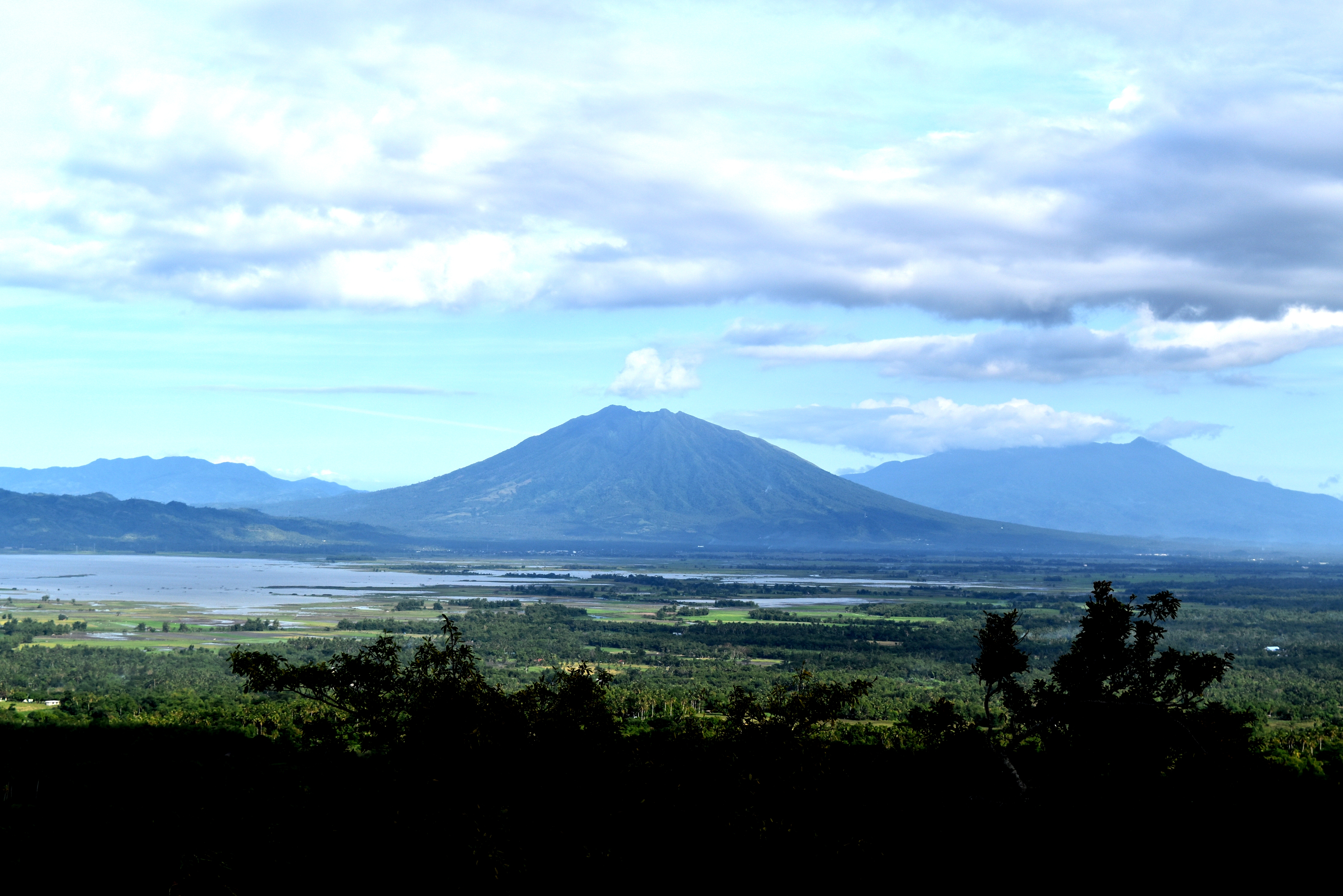
- Lake Baao as seen from Bula, Camarines Sur

- Location within the Philippines
- Location: Camarines Sur
- Coordinates: 13°28′8″N 123°18′36″E
- Type: lake
- Primary inflows: Tabao River
- Primary outflows: Bicol River
- Basin countries: Philippines
- Surface area: 177 ha (1.77 km^{2})
- Max. depth: 1 m (3.28 ft)
- Surface elevation: 5 m (16.40 ft)
- Settlements: Baao

Lake Baao is a shallow freshwater lake located in Baao, Camarines Sur in the Bicol Region of Luzon in the Philippines. It has an estimated surface area of 177 hectares (1.77 km^{2}) and reaches an average of only 1 metre (3 ft 3 in) deep. The lake is fed by local run-off and several small rivers, the most important of which is the Tabao River, which flows from another lake, Lake Buhi. The water from the lake then drains west into the Bicol River.

During summer months (March–May), the surface area of the lake shrinks leaving only one third of its original size, about 60 ha (0.60 km^{2}).
