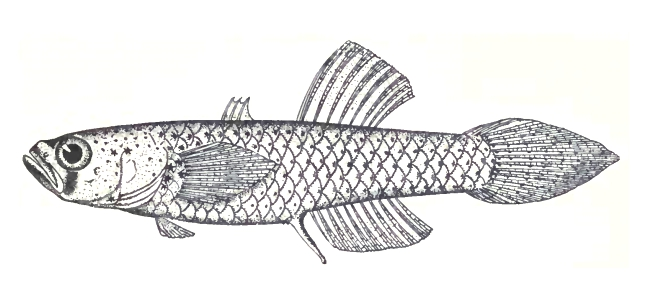

Conservation status
- Vulnerable (IUCN 3.1)

Scientific classification
- Kingdom: Animalia
- Phylum: Chordata
- Class: Actinopterygii
- Order: Gobiiformes
- Family: Oxudercidae
- Subfamily: Gobionellinae
- Genus: Mistichthys
- Species: M. luzonensis

Binomial name
- Mistichthys luzonensis H. M. Smith, 1902

Synonyms
- Gobiopterus luzonensis (H. M. Smith, 1902)

= Sinarapan =

Genus of fishes

The sinarapan or tabyos (Mistichthys luzonensis) is a species of fish in the goby subfamily, Gobionellinae, and the only member of the monotypic genus Mistichthys. It is endemic to the Philippines, where it occurs along the Bicol River and in Lakes Buhi, Bato, Lakelets Katugday and Manapao (both in Buhi) in Camarines Sur and in Danao Lake in Polangui, Albay.

The fish grows up to 2.5 centimeters long. It is transparent with a few dark spots and black eyes.

This freshwater fish lives in lakes from the shoreline to 12 meters in depth.

Tabyos is considered a delicacy, and it is of economic importance locally. It has been listed in the Guinness Book of Records as the "smallest commercially-harvested food fish". It is harvested with nets and palm leaves. It tends to school, making it easier to catch. It has been taken in large numbers since the 1940s, when it first became popular as food. It is fried or boiled and served with vegetables.

By the 1990s it had become clear that the sinarapan was overfished and was nearing extinction. It was also negatively affected by introduced species of fish in its native lakes, particularly the Nile tilapia (Oreochromis niloticus). Conservation actions taken include the transfer of thousands of sinarapan to safer lakes where they might reproduce effectively. The transport of the fish was difficult because it is very delicate, and well over half of each load died during the process. By 2001 there was evidence of successful reproduction in the new habitat.
