= Caramoan =

Municipality in Camarines Sur, Philippines

- Municipality
- Municipality of Caramoan
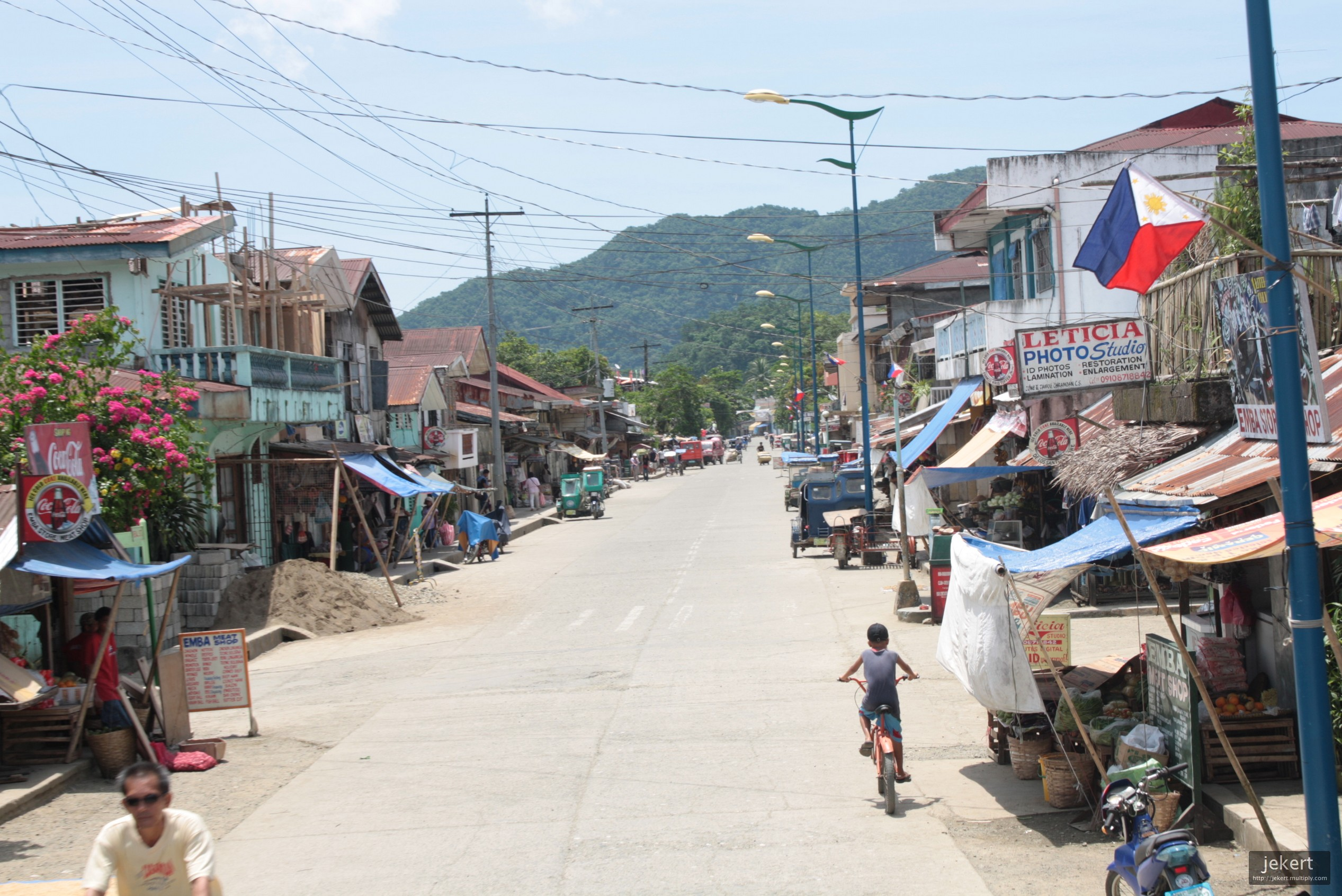
- Caramoan town proper

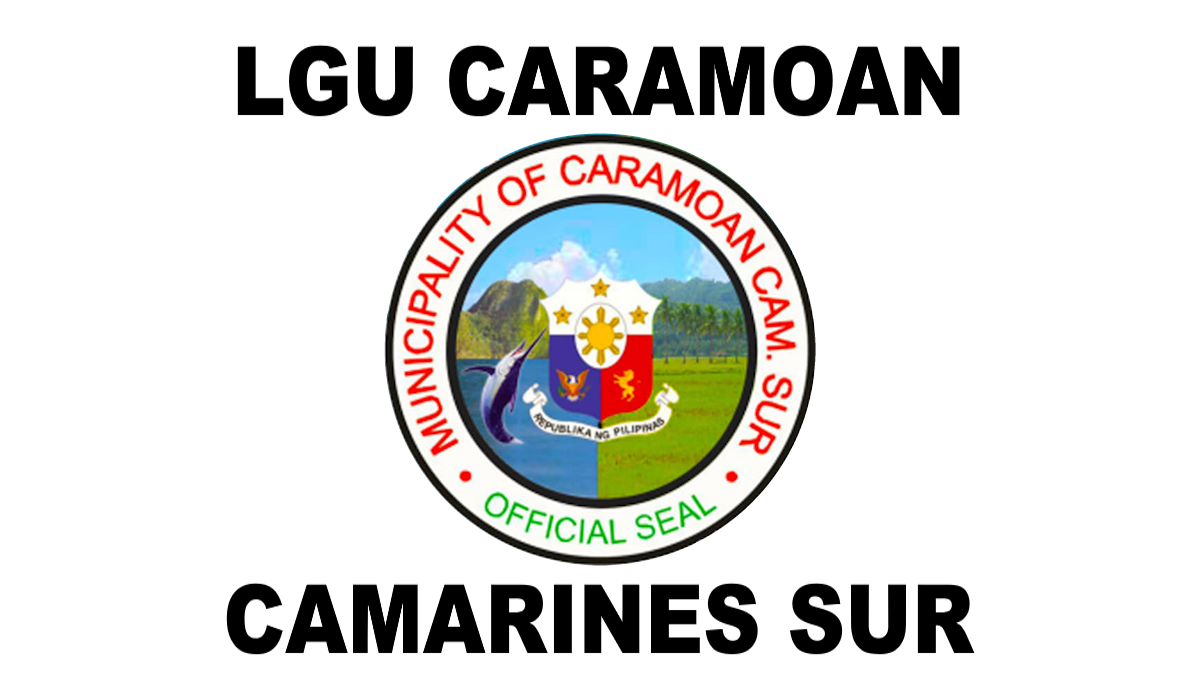
- Flag

- Map of Camarines Sur with Caramoan highlighted
- Interactive map of Caramoan
- Location within the Philippines
- Coordinates: 13°46′15″N 123°51′47″E
- Country: Philippines
- Region: Bicol Region
- Province: Camarines Sur
- District: 4th district
- Founded: 1619
- Barangays: 49 (see Barangays)

Government
  - Type: Sangguniang Bayan
  - Mayor: Marilyn Socorro H. Co
  - Vice Mayor: Dyan S. Ramirez
  - Representative: Arnulf Bryan B. Fuentebella
  - SB Members: Edvir G. Palaya; Honesto C. Obias II; Jeffrey F. Sancho; Francis R. Benemerito; John H. Camacho; Juan C. Cordis III; Elvis C. Alarkon; Gabrielle A. Padua
  - Electorate: 35,695 voters (2025)

Area
  - Total: 276.00 km^{2} (106.56 sq mi)
- Elevation: 14.1 m (46 ft)
- Highest elevation: 1,006 m (3,301 ft)
- Lowest elevation: 0 m (0 ft)

Population (2024 census)
  - Total: 50,433
  - Density: 182.73/km^{2} (473.26/sq mi)
  - Households: 11,570

Economy
  - Income class: 1st municipal income class
  - Poverty incidence: 35.27% (2023)
  - Revenue: ₱ 260.7 million (2024)
  - Assets: ₱ 623.8 million (2024)
  - Expenditure: ₱ 238 million (2024)
  - Liabilities: ₱ 200.5 million (2024)

Service provider
  - Electricity: Camarines Sur 4 Electric Cooperative (CASURECO 4)
- Time zone: UTC+8 (PST)
- ZIP code: 4429
- PSGC: 0501711000
- IDD : area code: +63 (0)54
- Native languages: Central Bikol; Tagalog

Caramoan, officially the Municipality of Caramoan (Central Bikol: Banwaan kan Caramoan; Tagalog: Bayan ng Caramoan), is a municipality in the province of Camarines Sur, Philippines. According to the 2024 census, it has a population of 50,433 people.

The town became known worldwide after being used in an international television show. The area features white beaches, calm lagoons, caves, rocky cliffs, and rich marine life. Even before its media exposure, Caramoan was appreciated for its natural and unspoiled island setting.

== History ==
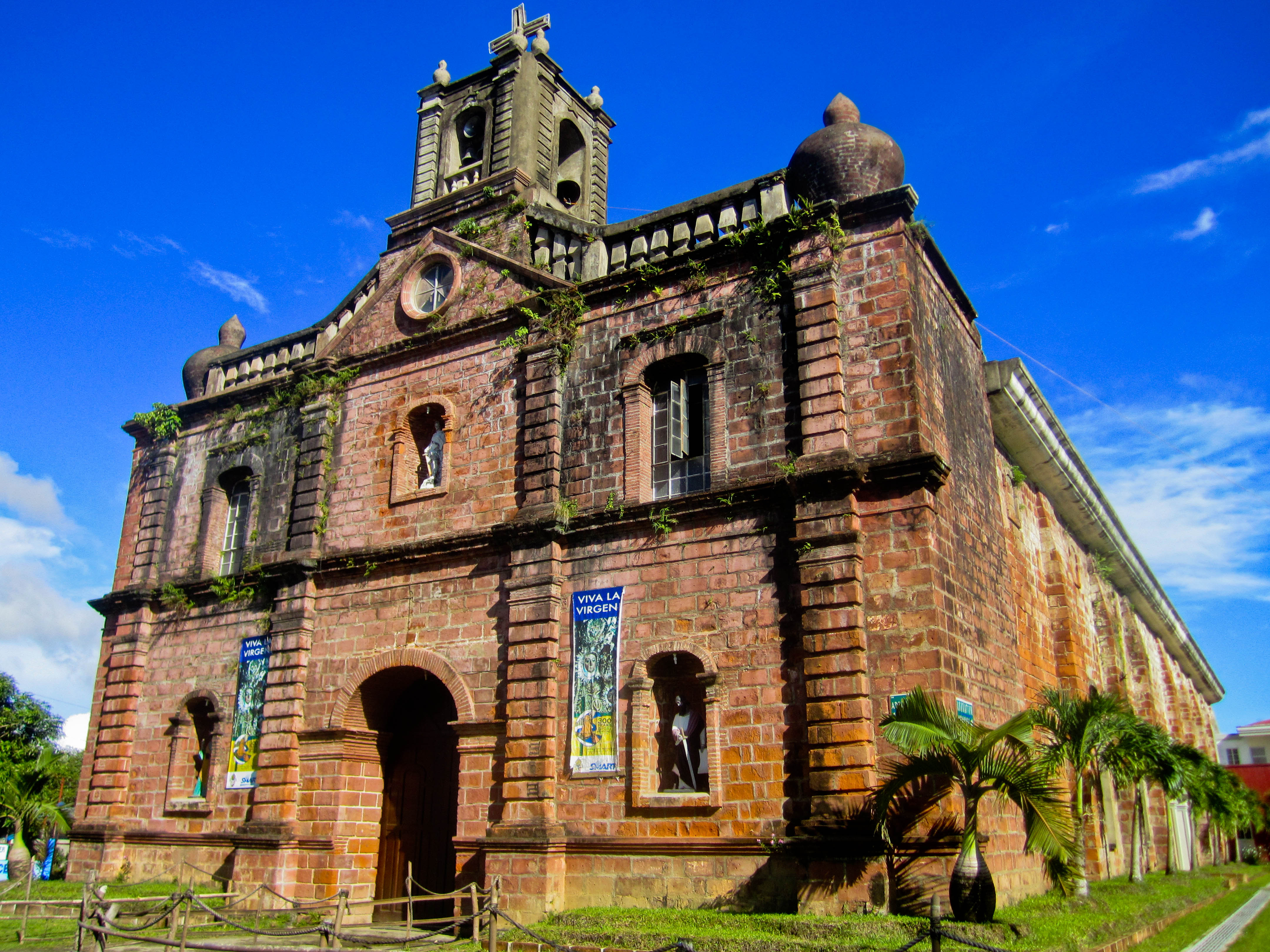
St. Michael the Archangel Parish Church

The name Caramoan has been officially used since 1619, the year it was named by a Spanish missionary friar, Francisco de la Cruz Y Oropesa. Fr. Oropesa penetrated the thick virgin forest of the Caramoan Peninsula and founded a small settlement in a place called Baluarte. This settlement was subsequently turned over to the administration of the Holy Bishopric in 1696.

Prior to the arrival of the Spaniards, it was determined that the place was once called Guta de Leche, which was given by Dutch traders who operated a gold mine in Lahuy Island and who frequented the area to trade with the natives. The name was perhaps derived from the milkdrop stalagmites found among the rocks of Guta Port. Upon the arrival of the Spaniards, the place came to be called "Carahan" for the sea turtle, which was at that time to be found in great number along the shores of the Peninsula.

== Geography ==
Caramoan is bounded on the north by the town of Garchitorena formerly town of Caramoan and the Philippine Sea of the Pacific Ocean; on the north-east by the island province of Catanduanes; on the south by Lagonoy Gulf; on the east by the Maqueda Channel and on the west by the municipality of Presentacion.

The municipality covers approximately 277.41 square kilometres (107.11 sq mi) with approximately 71 kilometres (44 mi) of irregular coastline surrounded by the vast ocean, bay, seas and swamps. It is approximately 500 kilometres (310 mi) from Metro Manila; 95 kilometres (59 mi) from the municipality of Pili, where the seat of the provincial government and the Naga Domestic Airport are located; and 110 kilometres (68 mi) east from Naga City, the heart of Bicol.

The municipality is located at the tip of the Caramoan Peninsula, a rugged place of land extending into the waters of the Maqueda Channel on the north and east and Lagonoy Gulf on the south. It has been dubbed as the Emerging Paradise of the Pacific due to its white and pink sand beaches known internationally.

=== Caramoan Islands ===
Off the coast of the peninsula are numerous small islets. The 10 principal islands of the group are:

- Bag-ing
- Cagbanilad
- Catanhawan
- Cotivas
- Lahos
- Lahuy
- Matukad
- Minalahos
- Pitogo
- Sabitang-Laya
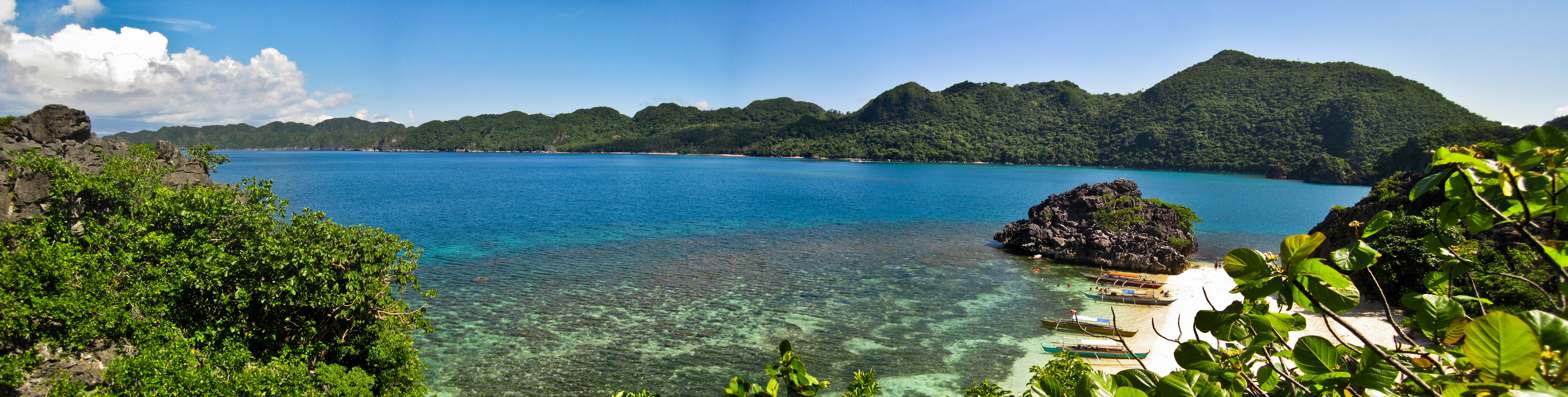
Matukad Island

=== Barangays ===
Caramoan is politically subdivided into 49 barangays. Each barangay consists of puroks and some have sitios.

- Agaas
- Antolon
- Bacgong
- Bahay
- Bikal
- Binanuahan
- Cabacongan
- Cadong
- Colongcogong
- Canatuan
- Caputatan
- Gogon
- Daraga
- Gata
- Gibgos
- Guijalo
- Hanopol
- Hanoy
- Haponan
- Ilawod
- Ili-Centro
- Lidong
- Lubas
- Malabog
- Maligaya
- Mampirao
- Mandiclum
- Maqueda
- Minalaba
- Oring
- Oroc-Osoc
- Pagolinan
- Pandanan
- Paniman
- Patag-Belen
- Pili-Centro
- Pili-Tabiguian
- Poloan
- Salvacion
- San Roque
- San Vicente
- Santa Cruz
- Solnopan
- Tabgon
- Tabiguian
- Tabog
- Tawog
- Toboan
- Terogo

=== Climate ===
Climate data for Caramoan, Camarines Sur
Month	Jan	Feb	Mar	Apr	May	Jun	Jul	Aug	Sep	Oct	Nov	Dec	Year
Mean daily maximum °C (°F)	30 (86)	30 (86)	32 (90)	35 (95)	35 (95)	35 (95)	34 (93)	35 (95)	33 (91)	31 (88)	31 (88)	29 (84)	33 (91)
Mean daily minimum °C (°F)	27 (81)	27 (81)	28 (82)	31 (88)	31 (88)	31 (88)	30 (86)	30 (86)	29 (84)	28 (82)	28 (82)	26 (79)	29 (84)
Average precipitation mm (inches)	151.1 (5.95)	198.89 (7.83)	106.28 (4.18)	60.08 (2.37)	63.62 (2.50)	85.76 (3.38)	117.53 (4.63)	46.99 (1.85)	52.23 (2.06)	740.22 (29.14)	522.70 (20.58)	618 (24.3)	2,763.4 (108.77)
Average rainy days	24	28	18	23	23	25	29	21	26	28	29	31	305
Source: World Weather Online (modeled/calculated data, not measured locally)

== Demographics ==
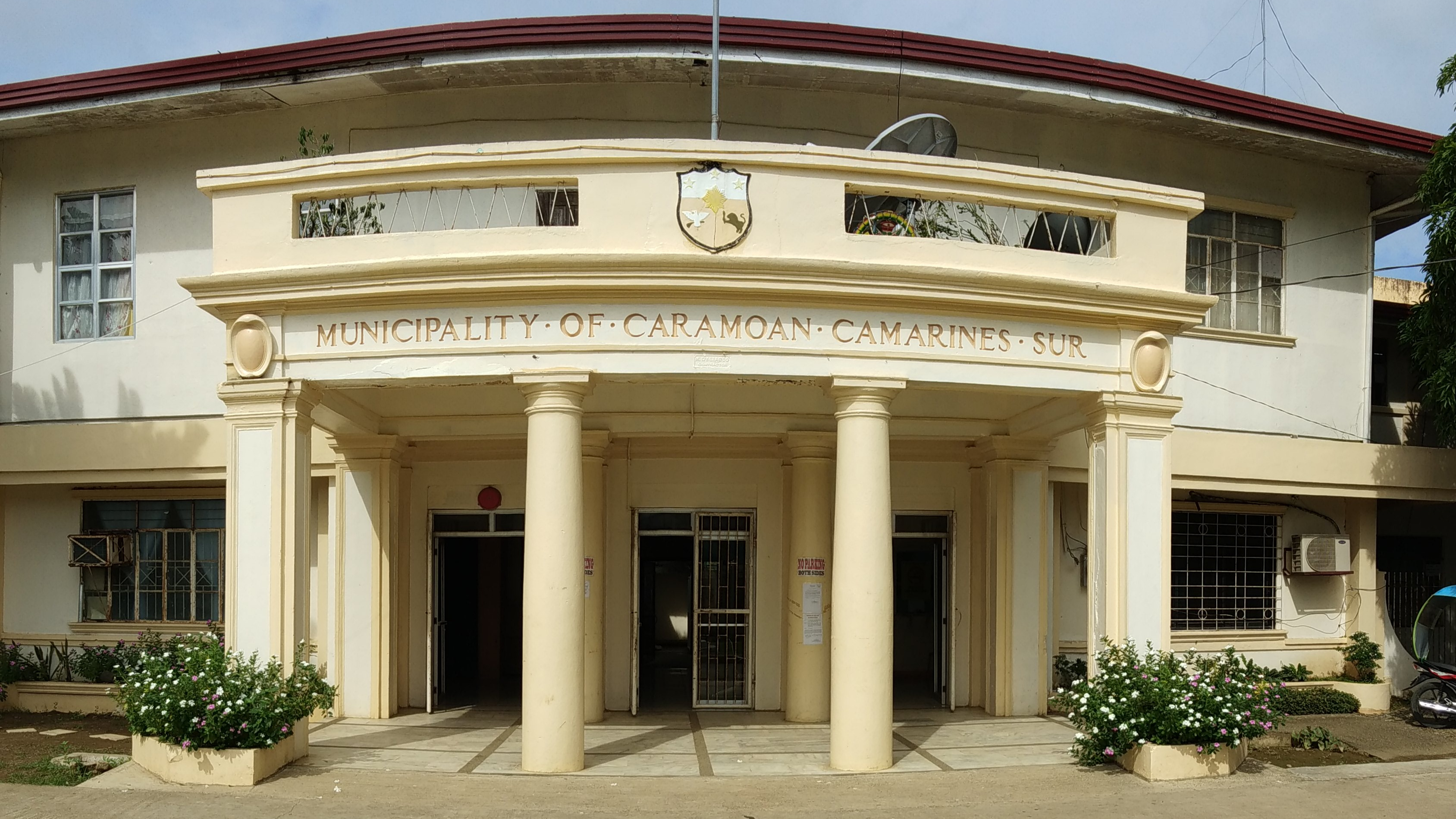
Caramoan Municipal Hall

Population census of Caramoan

Year	Pop.	±% p.a.
1948	26,836	—
1960	27,160	+0.10%
1970	31,339	+1.44%
1975	31,399	+0.04%
1980	32,659	+0.79%
1990	36,107	+1.01%
1995	39,416	+1.66%

Year	Pop.	±% p.a.
2000	39,642	+0.12%
2007	40,810	+0.40%
2010	44,945	+3.57%
2015	47,605	+1.10%
2020	51,728	+1.76%
2024	50,433	−0.61%

Source: Philippine Statistics Authority

In the 2024 census, the population of Caramoan was 50,433 people, with a density of 180 inhabitants per square kilometre or 470 inhabitants per square mile.

== Economy ==
Poverty incidence of Caramoan (%)

Source: Philippine Statistics Authority

== Tourism ==
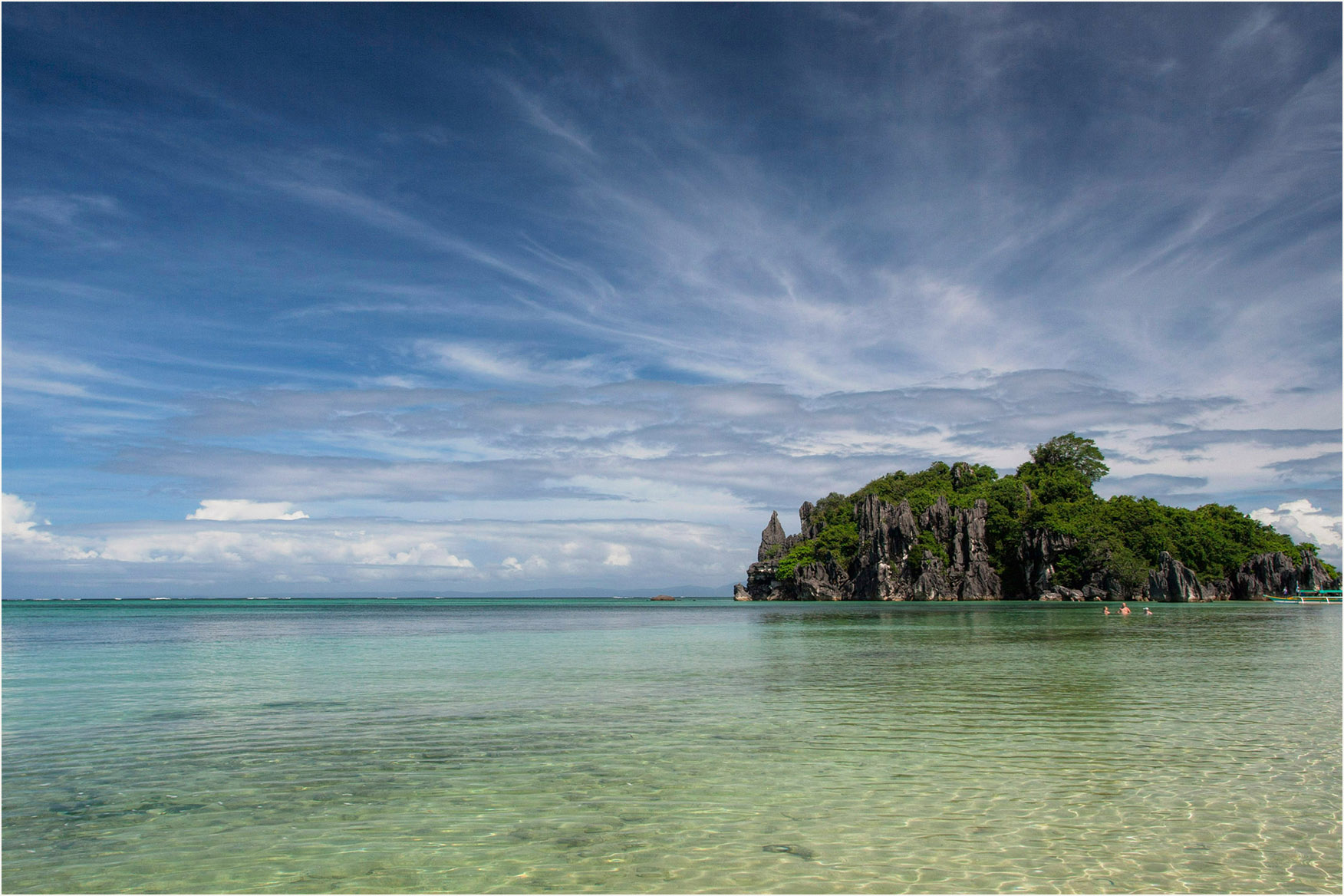
Sabitang-Laya Matukad Island

Tourist destinations include the Caramoan National Park, the Centro, and Gota Beach, where activities include diving, swimming, snorkeling and spelunking.

=== Survivor series ===
Caramoan has been the site for several editions of the competitive reality television show Survivor. The area has hosted the U.S. version in two consecutive seasons (Survivor: Philippines and Survivor: Caramoan), the Serbian version for two consecutive seasons and the Israeli version for three consecutive seasons (** Survivor: The Philippines, Survivor: Fans vs. Survivors, Survivor: Camarines). Bulgarian Survivor also filmed its fourth season there in May to July 2009. Robinson 2010, the 12th season of the Swedish version of the franchise, was filmed in Caramoan from May to June 2010. Finnish versions were filmed in there in 2018 with all-celebrity cast, and in 2019 half-famous and half- regular people cast.

The 8th season of Koh-Lanta, the French edition of Survivor, also was shot there. TV director Corinne Vaillant stated that "the powdery sand, the coconuts on Gota beach and the neighboring islets are a 'dream' for the French people. We chose Caramoan because it’s really wild. It’s necessary that contestants don’t see anything other than nature for them to believe that they’re really lost in the wilds.”

The only season of Survivor India was shot in Caramoan, with an Indian production crew spotted in the area in March 2011.

The first season of Supraviețuitorul, a Romanian reality game based on Survivor was shot in Caramoan in the summer of 2016, as well as the first and second season of Robinsonův ostrov (Czech version).

In spring of 2016 the first season of the Slovenian version of Survivor Philippines was filmed on 4 different islands, including Catanaguan and Tayak.

The twentieth season of L'Isola Dei Famosi, an italian reality game inspired on Survivor, was also shot in the beginning of 2026 in the Caramoan Islands.

== Education ==
The Caramoan Schools District Office governs all educational institutions within the municipality. It oversees the management and operations of all private and public, from primary to secondary schools.

=== Primary and elementary schools ===
- Agaas Primary School
- Agawan Elementary School (Sitio of Tabog)
- Antolon Elementary School
- Bacgong Primary School
- Bahay Elementary School
- Bikal Elementary School
- Bikal Fishery School
- Cabacongan Elementary School
- Cadong Primary School
- Cagnipa Primary School
- Canatuan Primary School
- Caputatan Primary School
- Caramoan Central School
- Colongcogong Elementary School
- Daraga Elementary School
- Gata Elementary School
- Gibgos Elementary School
- Gogon Elementary School
- Guijalo Elementary School
- Guinahoan Elementary School
- Hanopol Elementary School
- Hanoy Primary School
- Haponan Elementary School
- Homatoy Primary School
- Ilawod Elementary School
- Instituto de Caceres
- Lidong Elementary School
- Lubas Elementary School
- Malabog Elementary School
- Maligaya Elementary School
- Malindog Primary School
- Mampirao Elementary School
- Mandiclom Elementary School
- Maqueda Primary School
- Marian Formation Center
- Minalaba Elementary School
- Oring Elementary School
- Oroc-Osoc Primary School
- Pagolinan Primary School
- Pandanan Elementary School
- Paniman Elementary School
- Patag-Guijalo Elementary School
- Patag-Poloan Elementary School
- Pawican Elementary School
- Pili-Centro Elementary School
- Pili-Tabiguian Elementary School
- Poloan Elementary School
- Salvacion Elementary School
- San Francisco Elementary School
- San Roque Elementary School
- Sta. Cruz Elementary School
- Tabgon Elementary School
- Tabiguian Elementary School
- Tabog Elementary School
- Terogo Elementary School
- Toboan Elementary School

=== Secondary schools ===
- Bonifacio D. Borebor Sr. High School
- Gibgos National High School
- Guijalo National High School
- Oring National High School
- Tabgon National High School
- Tawog National High School (Eastern Coast National High School)
- Tawog National High School (Northern Peninsula)
- United High School
