= Caramoan National Park =

Protected area

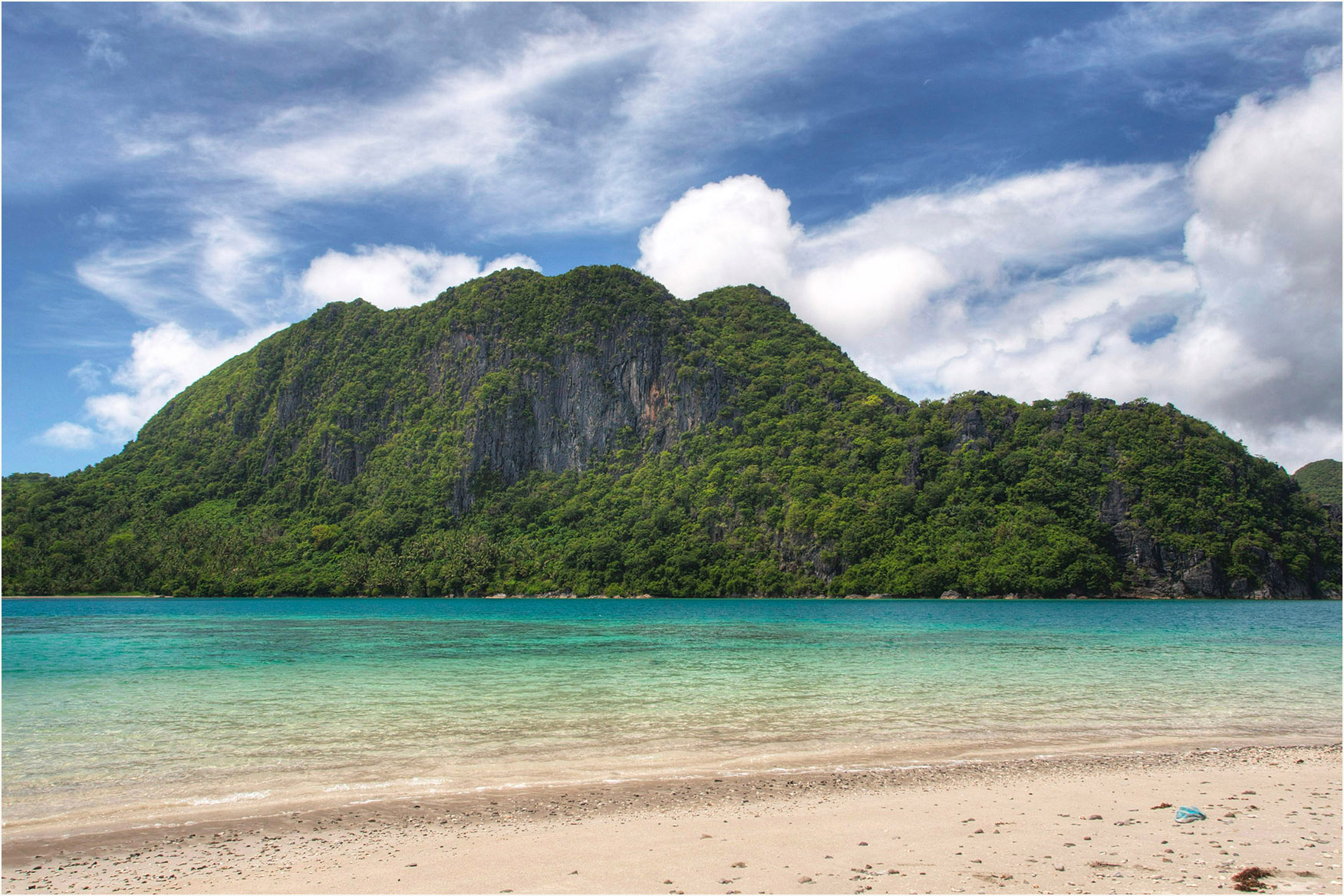
- Pitogo Island off Caramoan Peninsula
- Interactive map of Caramoan National Park
- Location: Camarines Sur, Bicol Region, Philippines
- Coordinates: 13.800°N 123.882°E
- Area: 347 ha (860 acres)
- Established: July 20, 1938

The Caramoan National Park is a 347-hectare (860-acre) national park and protected area in Camarines Sur, Philippines. It was established in 1938. The park has caves, limestone formations, white sandy beaches, an islet lake and a subterranean river, make it popular with tourists. It is accessible by public transport from the municipality of Caramoan, and local people have established trails in the park for visitors.

== Geography ==
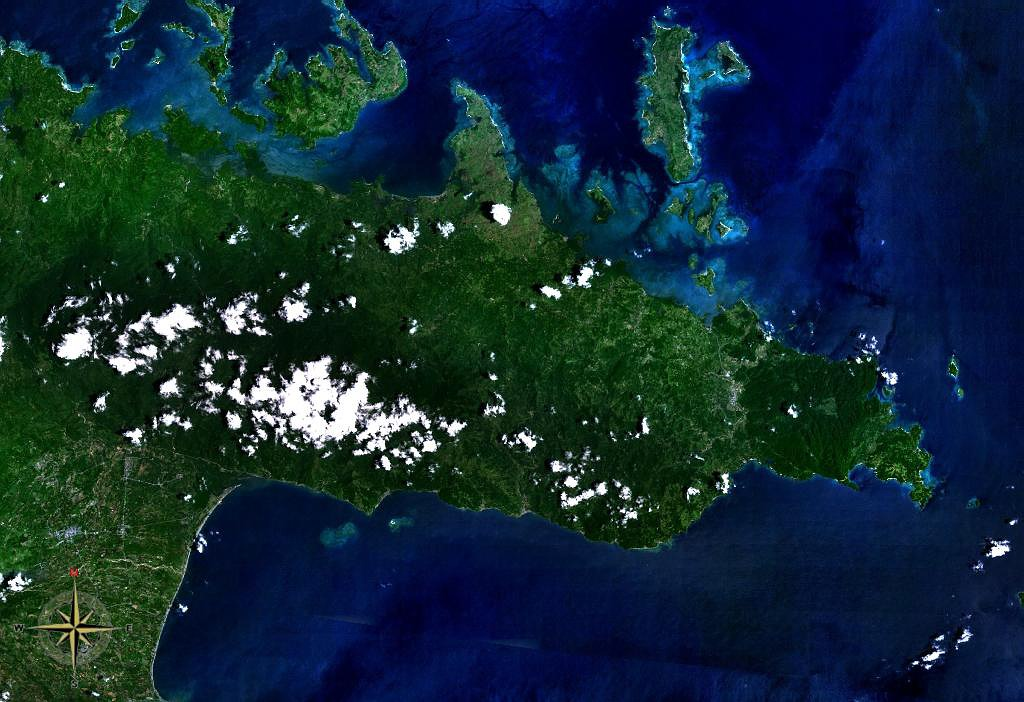
Caramoan Peninsula seen from space

The national park is located in the Caramoan Peninsula, a hilly peninsula in north-east Camarines Sur, Bicol Region, Philippines with deep gorges and a rough, rocky terrain. It is also an Important Bird Area with habitat for the green racket-tail (Prioniturus luconensis).

== See also ==
- List of national parks of the Philippines
