= Ofelia M. Samar-Sy =

Filipino physician

Ofelia Manibog Samar-Sy
- Ofelia Manibog Samar-Sy
- Born: Ofelia Manibog Samar; January 25, 1962 (age 64); Malawag, Nabua, Camarines Sur, Philippines
- Education: University of Philippines-Philippine General Hospital (internal medicine and cardiology)
- Occupations: Physician, educator, humanitarian

Ofelia Manibog Samar-Sy (born January 25, 1962) is a Filipino physician in Internal medicine and Cardiology, medical educator, former medical director of Ibalong Medical Center in Legazpi City, Albay, (1994-2004) in May 2014 she was appointed Dean, College of Medicine of Bicol Christian College. She is currently the Dean of Bicol University College of Medicine.

== Education ==
In 1994 she was named an Associate Fellow of the Philippine Heart Association Philippine College of Cardiology. In May 1994 she became a Diplomate in Internal Medicine given by the Philippine College of Physicians.

Doctor of Philosophy in Human Resource Management – Bicol College, 2018 Master in Hospital Management – Philippine Christian University, 2019 Master of Science in Health Systems Management – Philippine Women’s University, 2016 Master of Science in Public Health – AMEC‑Bicol Christian College of Medicine, 2014 Doctor of Medicine – University of the East Ramon Magsaysay Memorial Medical Center, 1986 Bachelor of Science in Biology – Bicol University, 1981, Summa Cum Laude

== Public service ==
Samar-Sy is a researcher and community volunteer in Bicol where she leads and coordinates for various local and national organizations such as A.G.A.P.P. Foundation (Aklat, Gabay, Aruga tungo sa Pag-angat at Pag-asa), Yellow Boat of Hope Foundation, Albay Medical Society, Pinoy Power Bicol Coalition, Inc. (PPBCI), and the People Power Volunteers for Reform (PPVR).

Currently she is the Dean of Bicol University College of Medicine.

== Selected publications ==
- "A Randomized Double-Blind Placebo-controlled Clinical Trial on the Effect of Bio-Normalizer on Liver Cirrhosis (Final Report)". Philippine Journal of Internal Medicine. Osato Suno Research Institute. February 5, 2015.
- "A Variant Of Primary Aldosteronism (Conn's Syndrome) - A Case Report". Phil. J. Cardiology. March 1992.
- "Preoperative Predictors of Complications Among Filipinos Undergoing Non-cardiac Surgery in a Tertiary General Hospital". Philippine Journal of Internal Medicine. 33 (5). 1995.
- "Intravenous Magnesium In The Reduction Of Arrthmias and Mortality in AMI: Meta-Analysis". Phil J Intern Med. 33 (5): 17–182. 1995.
- "Paralytic Shellfish Poisoning: PGH In-Hospital Experience Preliminary Data". Philippine Journal of Internal Medicine. 33 (4): 151–154. 1995.
- "The Bicol University COVID-19 Study on the Clinicodemographic Profile, Extent of Exposures, Vaccination, and Predictors of Outcomes Among its Employees: A Retrospective Cohort Study". Bicol University R&D Journal. 25 (1). 2022.
