= Lake Buhi =

Lake in Camarines Sur, Philippines

- Danaw Buhi (Central Bikol); Lawa ng Buhi (Filipino)
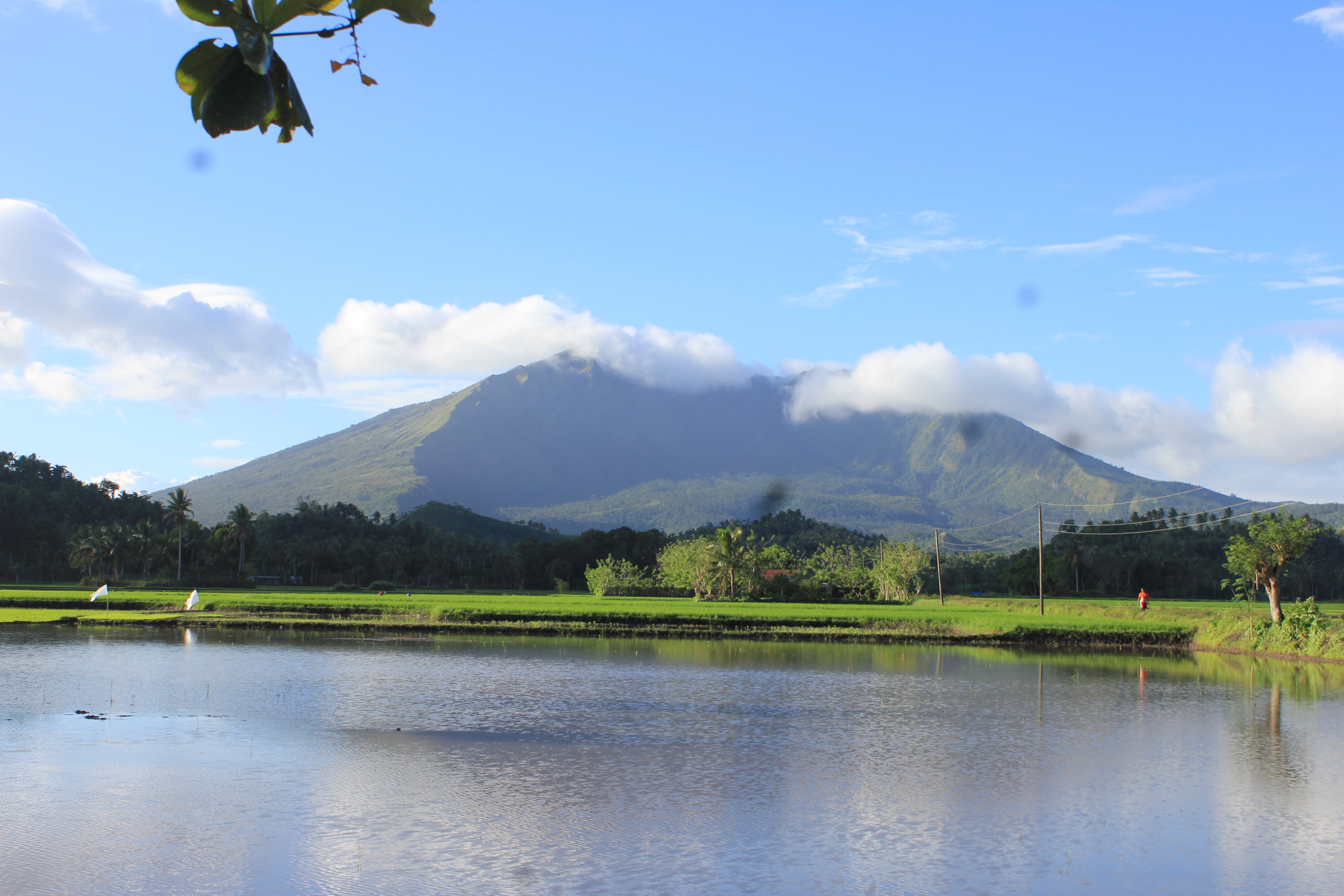
- The lake with Mount Iriga in the background

- Location within the Philippines
- Location: Bicol Peninsula
- Coordinates: 13°27′00″N 123°31′00″E
- Type: Freshwater
- Primary inflows: Buhi River; Iriga River
- Primary outflows: Tabao River
- Basin countries: Philippines
- Surface area: 1,707 ha (17.07 km^{2})
- Average depth: 8 m (26.25 ft)
- Max. depth: 12 m (39.37 ft)
- Surface elevation: 120 m (393.70 ft)
- Settlements: Buhi

Lake Buhi is a lake found in Buhi, Camarines Sur in the Philippines. It has an area of 18 square kilometres (6.9 square miles) and has an average depth of 8 metres (26 ft). The lake lies in the valley formed by two ancient volcanoes, Mount Iriga (also known as Mount Asog) and Mount Malinao. It was created in 1641, when an earthquake caused a side of Mount Asog to collapse. The resulting landslide created a natural dam that blocked the flow of nearby streams. Another theory suggests that it was created by the eruption of Mt. Asog, which is now dormant.

The lake is famous since it is one of the few bodies of water that contains the sinarapan (Mistichthys luzonensis) which is the world's smallest commercially harvested fish.

Aside from the sinarapan, Lake Buhi is also home for other marine organisms such as the Irin-irin (Redigobius bikolanus), Dalag (Channa striata), Puyo (Anabas testudineus), Kotnag (Hemiramphus sp.), Burirawan (Strophidon sathete) and native catfish (Clarias sp.). Other fishes are introduced to boost the fishery industry such as the Nile tilapia (Oreochromis niloticus), Mozambique tilapia (Oreochromis mossambicus), common carp (Cyprinus carpio) and Bangkok hito (Clarias sp.).

The forest surrounding the lake is the home of at least 25 bird species. The five endemic species are the Philippine pygmy woodpecker, Philippine hanging parrot, black-naped monarch, elegant tit and the white-eared brown dove. Other fauna found in the forest are flying lizards (Draco sp.), skinks, monitor lizards (Varanus marmoratus), civets, bats and the Philippine Cynomolgus monkey (Macaca fascicularis).

Today the lake is the main source of water supply for the National Power Corporation Hydro Electric Plant. The power plant, which was founded in 1952, generates an average of 2.8 megawatts. It is also used by the National Irrigation Administration to irrigate at least 100 square kilometres (39 square miles) of the Riconada towns located downstream and Iriga City.

== Fish kill ==
On September 22, 2007, a fish kill in Camarines Sur's Lake Buhi threatened the livelihood of local fishermen. The Bureau of Fisheries and Aquatic Resources (BFAR) stated that it resulted from sulfur dioxide from Iriga City, since the rains by the southwest monsoon loosened the sulfur dioxide from nearby volcanoes. The Philippine Institute of Volcanology and Seismology (Phivolcs) rejected the BFAR's finding. Buhi has a population of 67,762 people and comprises 13,238 households.

== Gallery ==
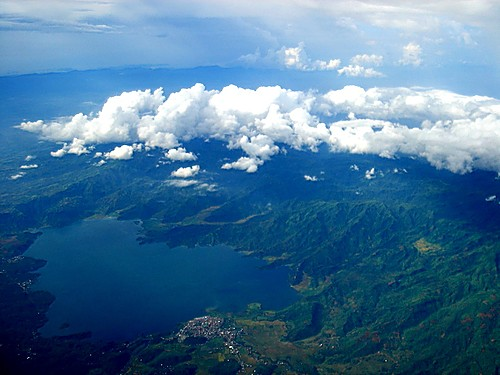
Aerial view of Lake Buhi

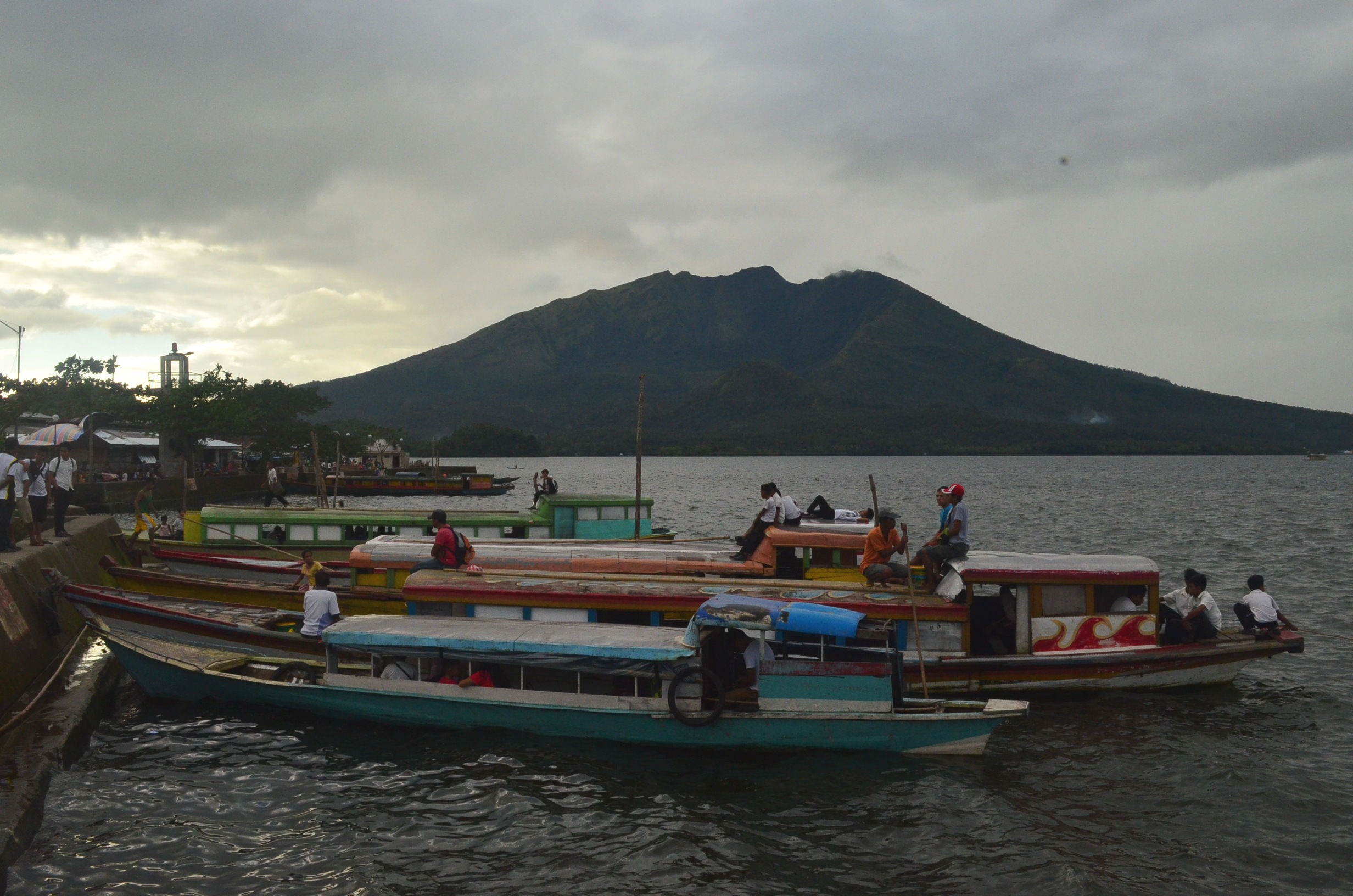
Passenger boat at the lake

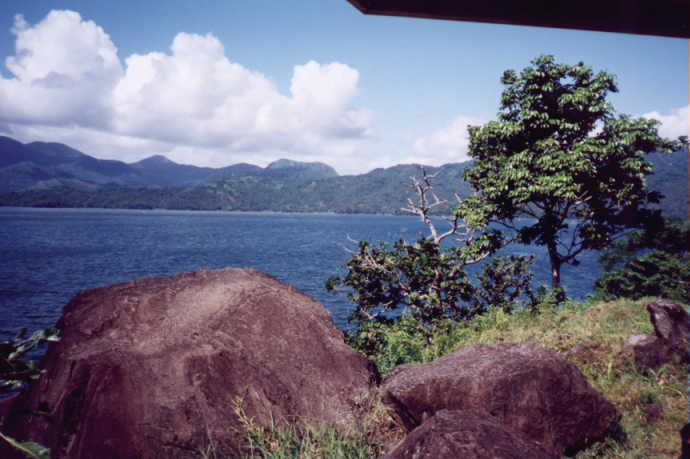
Volcanic rocks on the lake

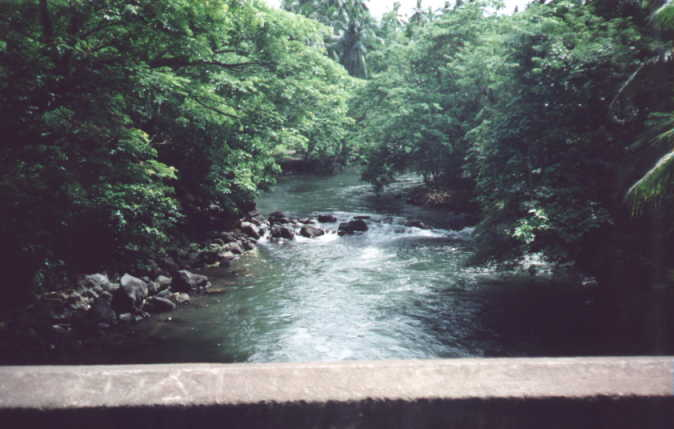
View atop Barit River Bridge, one of the lake's tributaries

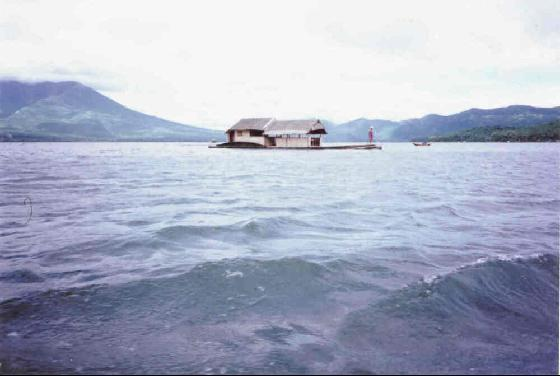
Floating cottages in the lake
