= Milaor =

Municipality in Camarines Sur, Philippines

- Municipality
- Municipality of Milaor
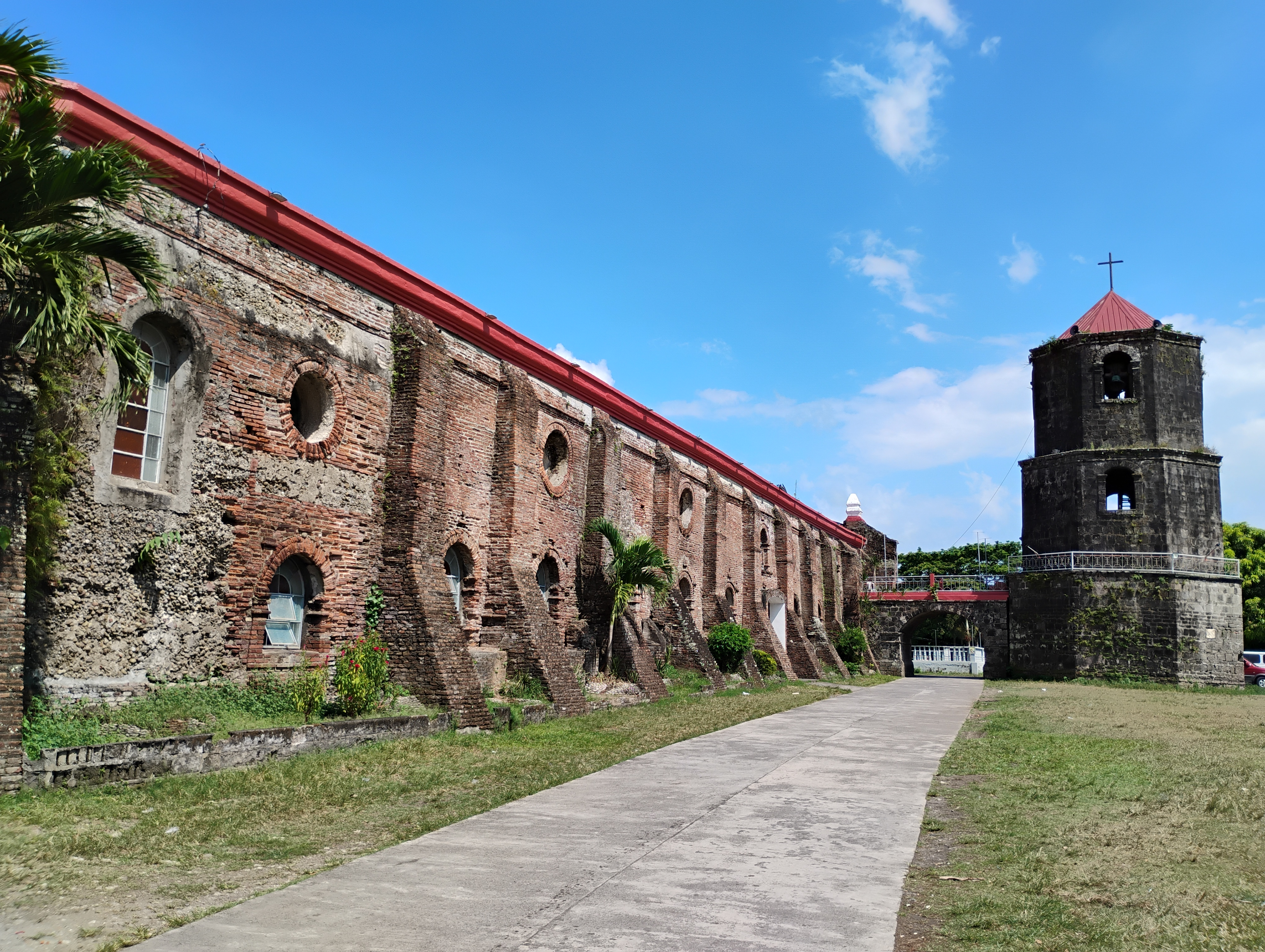
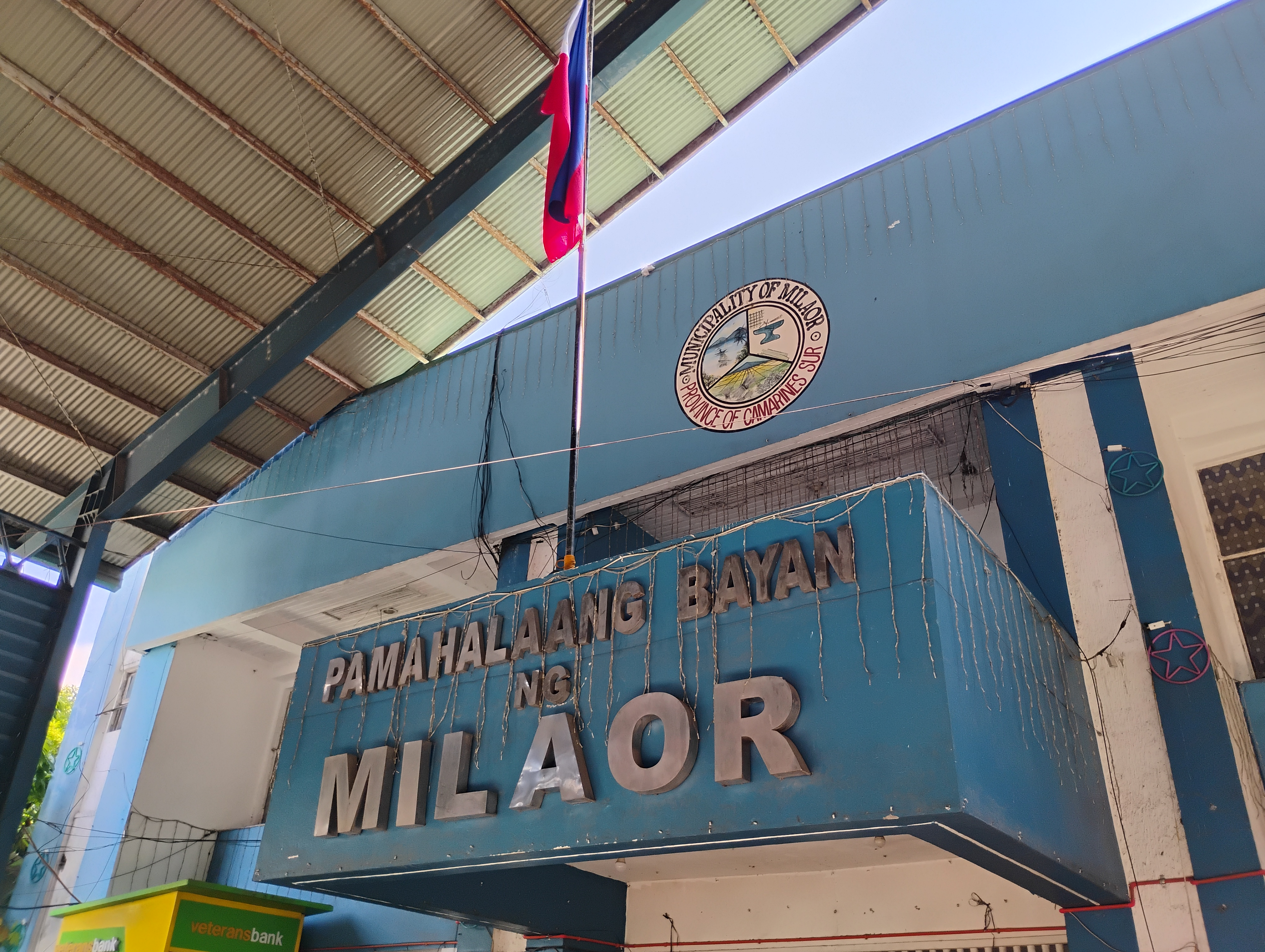
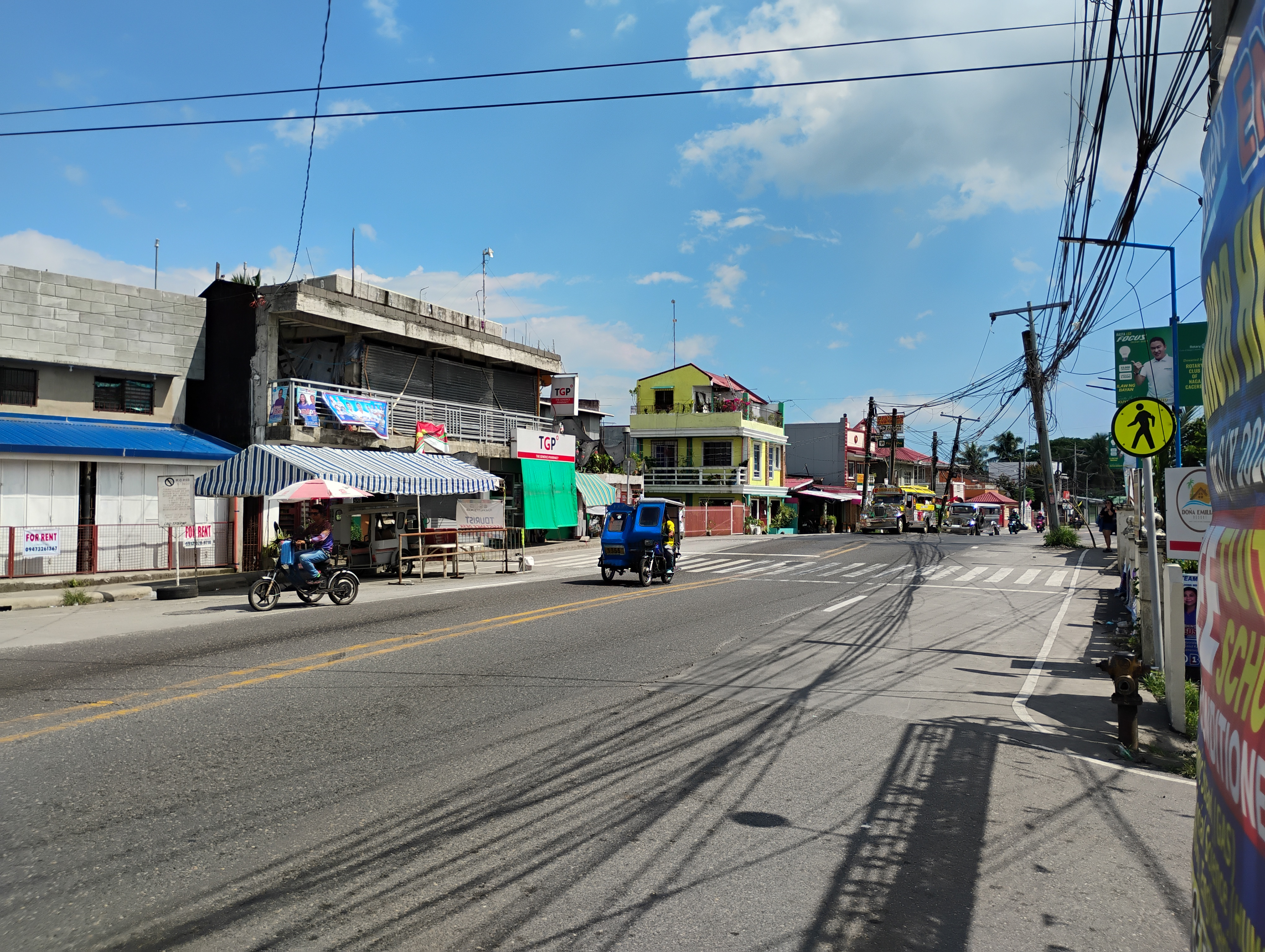
- Saint Joseph the Worker Parish Church Milaor Municipal Hall Milaor Town Proper

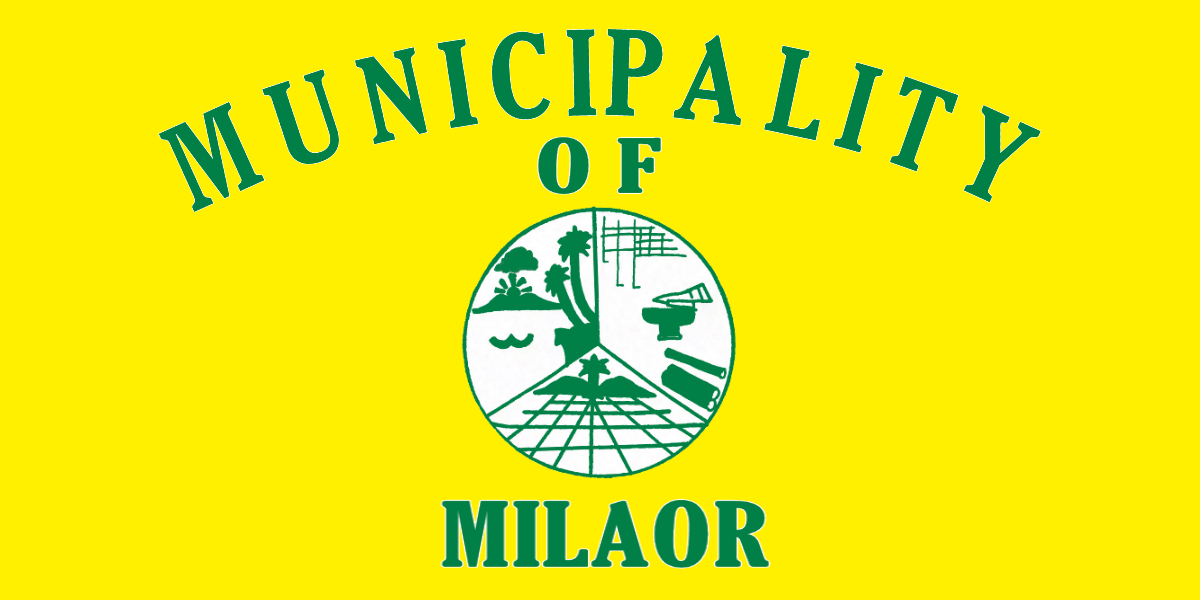
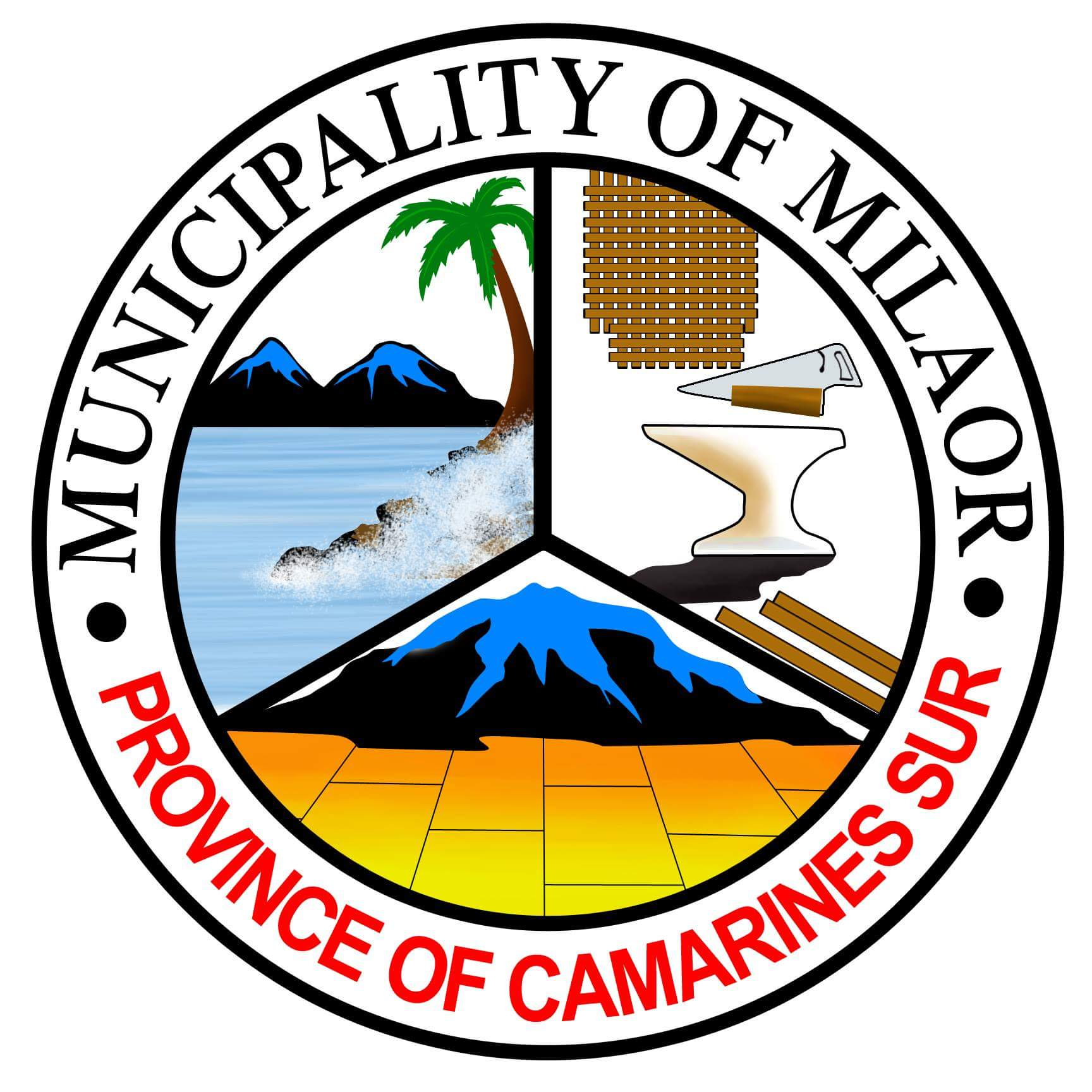
- Flag Seal

- Map of Camarines Sur with Milaor highlighted
- Interactive map of Milaor
- Location within the Philippines
- Coordinates: 13°35′53″N 123°10′41″E
- Country: Philippines
- Region: Bicol Region
- Province: Camarines Sur
- District: 2nd district
- Founded: May 1, 1585
- Barangays: 20 (see Barangays)

Government
  - Type: Sangguniang Bayan
  - Mayor: Rubilyn C. Euste
  - Vice Mayor: Rogel Abel A. Flores
  - Representative: Vincenzo Renato Luis R. Villafuerte
  - Municipal Council: Members: Rogel Abel A. Flores; Lyndon A. Gases; Josephine S. Hidalgo; Enrico T. Manzano; Lairenz Ronic P. Bañaga; Rubilyn E. de Dios; Salvador D. Felizmenio; Rodrigo F. Tanaotanao
  - Electorate: 24,479 voters (2025)

Area
  - Total: 33.64 km^{2} (12.99 sq mi)
- Elevation: 5.0 m (16.4 ft)
- Highest elevation: 30 m (98 ft)
- Lowest elevation: −3 m (−9.8 ft)

Population (2024 census)
  - Total: 33,680
  - Density: 1,001/km^{2} (2,593/sq mi)
  - Households: 7,241

Economy
  - Income class: 3rd municipal income class
  - Poverty incidence: 21.01% (2023)
  - Revenue: ₱ 158.6 million (2024)
  - Assets: ₱ 681.7 million (2024)
  - Expenditure: ₱ 157.1 million (2024)
  - Liabilities: ₱ 210.4 million (2024)

Service provider
  - Electricity: Camarines Sur 2 Electric Cooperative (CASURECO 2)
- Time zone: UTC+8 (PST)
- ZIP code: 4413
- PSGC: 0501721000
- IDD : area code: +63 (0)54
- Native languages: Central Bikol; Tagalog
- Website: milaor.gov.ph

Milaor, officially the Municipality of Milaor (Central Bikol: Banwaan kan Milaor; Tagalog: Bayan ng Milaor), is a municipality in the province of Camarines Sur, Philippines. According to the 2024 census, it has a population of 33,680 people.

It is known as a religious town and serves as the gateway to the Maharlika Highway near Naga City. It has notable churches that draw both local and foreign visitors.

== Etymology ==
Milaor was formerly called Milaud or May-laud. Laud means a lowland prone to being flooded, in fact that is being true up to this day. The expression mapa-laud means to go to a place which is low or with water, in other words, to go to a laud. From Milaud or Maylaud, it was changed to Milaor. The truth of this matter of the place being always filled with water is corroborated by the fact that in many barangays are to be found shells which thrive on water. These shell fossils mean that in ancient time this place was really covered with water or is frequently flooded to allow these shells or mollusks to thrive in the place.

== History ==
The work of evangelization in Milaor began in 1579 when the Franciscan missionaries came to the Philippines upon the order of Pope Sixtus V and King Philip II, and given specific assignment to work in Bicol Region. In 1585, Milaor was declared a parish under the titular patron, Saint Joseph. The first parish administrator was Fray Matias de Andrade, OFM., who arrived in Bikol in 1582 and later became the fifth Bishop of the Diocese of Nueva Caceres.

The Franciscans, Fray Juan del Sacramento and Fray Jose dela Virgen, initiated the construction of a church made of bricks and stones. This was built in a place known today as "Sinimbahanan" now a part of Cabusao, where ruins of the concrete foundation may still be found. Frequent attacks from the cimarrones and the tulisanes from nearby Mount Isarog, however, caused the transfer of the church to its present site. Fray Santiago de San Pedro de Alcantara completed the construction in 1730 and added a convent made of wooden materials in 1735. Both the church and the convent were destroyed by fire in 1740 and immediately the reconstruction was undertaken by Fray Francisco delos Santos, OFM. The present belfry was finished in 1840. The 1818 Spanish census recorded the area as having 1,902 native families and 7 Spanish-Filipino families.

Originally, Milaor comprised Palestina and the present parishes of Minalabac, San Fernando and Gainza. Until the eve following the uprising Naga City on September 19, 1898, during the Philippine Revolution, the Franciscan considered Milaor as their favorite resting place and abode away from the adjacent rapidly developing settlement that is Naga City today.

== Geography ==
Milaor is 17 kilometres (11 mi) from Pili and 433 kilometres (269 mi) from Manila.

=== Barangays ===
Milaor is politically subdivided into 20 barangays. Each barangay consists of puroks and some have sitios.

Just like most cities in the Philippines, Milaor has a barangay system which is the core Local Government of the Philippines. Each barangay is headed by a chairman and barangay councils who were elected to office by popular vote of the community registered voters every three years.

- Alimbuyog
- Amparado (Pob)
- Balagbag
- Borongborongan
- Cabugao
- Capucnasan
- Dalipay
- Del Rosario (Pob)
- Flordeliz
- Lipot
- Mayaopayawan
- Maycatmon
- Maydaso
- San Antonio
- San Jose (Pob)
- San Miguel (Pob)
- San Roque (Pob)
- San Vicente (Pob)
- Santo Domingo (Pob)
- Tarusanan

=== Climate ===
Climate data for Milaor, Camarines Sur
Month	Jan	Feb	Mar	Apr	May	Jun	Jul	Aug	Sep	Oct	Nov	Dec	Year
Mean daily maximum °C (°F)	32 (90)	32 (90)	35 (95)	37 (99)	37 (99)	36 (97)	35 (95)	33 (91)	35 (95)	34 (93)	33 (91)	32 (90)	34 (94)
Mean daily minimum °C (°F)	27 (81)	27 (81)	29 (84)	31 (88)	32 (90)	32 (90)	31 (88)	29 (84)	31 (88)	29 (84)	28 (82)	28 (82)	30 (85)
Average precipitation mm (inches)	37.28 (1.47)	59.59 (2.35)	37.03 (1.46)	75.7 (2.98)	97.75 (3.85)	154.2 (6.07)	285.71 (11.25)	283.29 (11.15)	185.08 (7.29)	371.1 (14.61)	100.7 (3.96)	299.0 (11.77)	1,986.43 (78.21)
Average rainy days	18	23	16	16	25	28	31	26	27	29	24	29	292
Source: World Weather Online (modeled/calculated data, not measured locally)

== Demographics ==
Population census of Milaor

Year	Pop.	±% p.a.
1903	3,758	—
1918	3,583	−0.32%
1939	7,389	+3.51%
1948	5,877	−2.51%
1960	8,551	+3.17%
1970	11,284	+2.81%
1975	13,167	+3.14%
1980	15,018	+2.66%

Year	Pop.	±% p.a.
1990	18,199	+1.94%
1995	21,213	+2.91%
2000	22,635	+1.40%
2007	26,452	+2.17%
2010	28,474	+2.72%
2015	31,150	+1.73%
2020	33,963	+1.84%
2024	33,680	−0.20%

Source: Philippine Statistics Authority

In the 2024 census, the population of Milaor was 33,680 people, with a density of 1,000 inhabitants per square kilometre or 2,600 inhabitants per square mile.

=== Languages ===
Central Bikol language is primarily being used in the town. Most people in Milaor speak the Coastal Bikol (Naga dialect) as their main language. While further south closer to Minalabac speaks a little of Rinconada Bikol which is recognized as a minority language. Tagalog is a secondary language in the town primarily used for tourists and visitors that cannot speak Bicolano language. Residents speak English as well when they go to work or school.

=== Religion ===
==== Parishes (Catholic Church in Milaor) ====
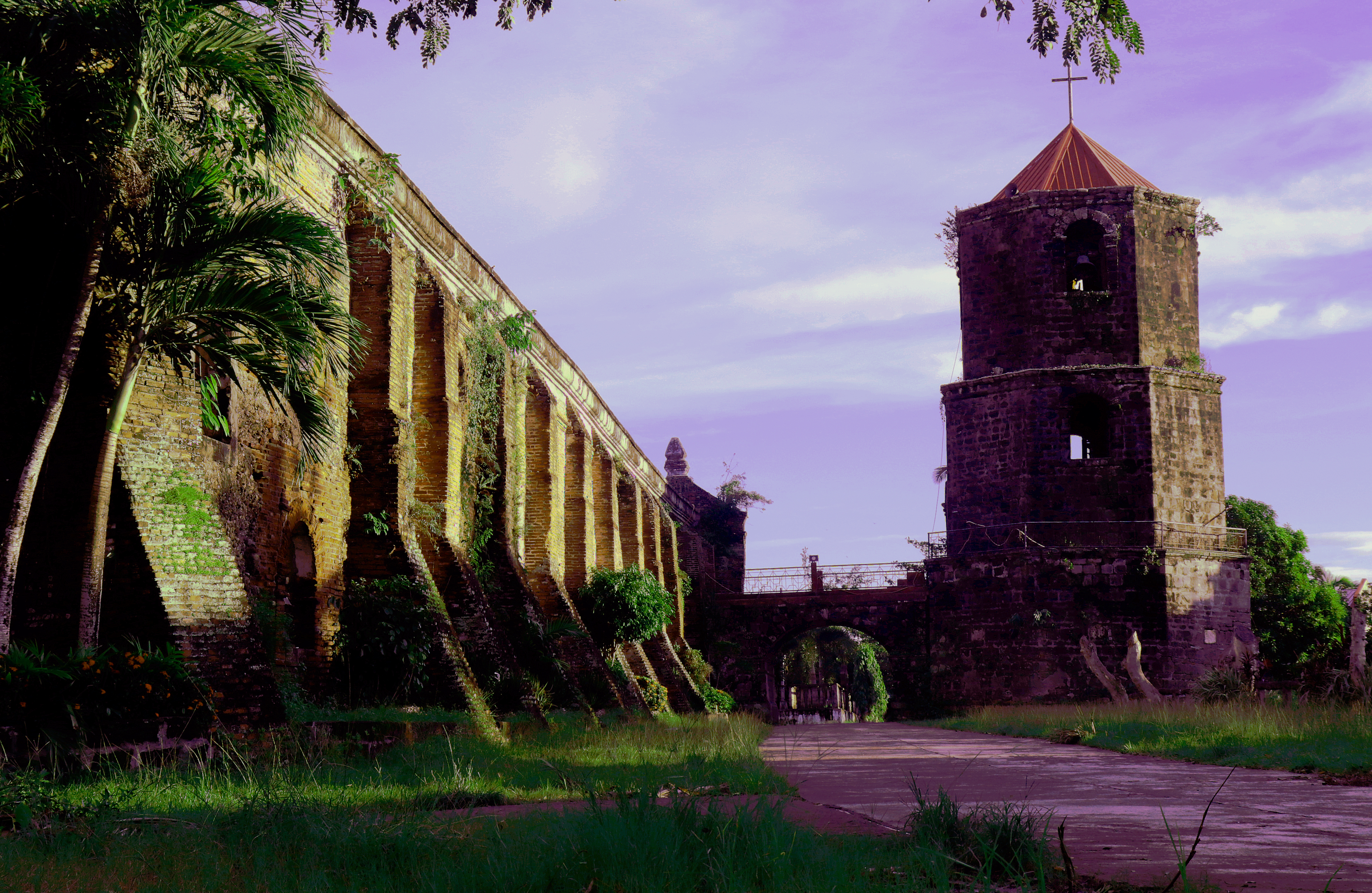
Milaor Church in 2020

===== St. Joseph the Worker Parish =====
St. Joseph the Worker is the titular patron saint of the Municipality. The town and parish fiesta are celebrated every 1st day of May. The present parish priest is Rev. Fr. Ruben R. Buena. The vision of the parish is to continue forming Basic Ecclesial Communities, locally called as SKK or Saradit na Kristiyanong Komunidad. The locus and focus of this dream of the Church is by clustering all the neighboring families. Each cluster is composed of 15-20 families.

===== St. Anthony of Padua Parish =====
On May 13, 1994, another parish within the municipality of Milaor was established. The seat is at barangay San Antonio and the titular patron saint is St. Anthony of Padua. At present the parish priest is Rev. Fr. Edgar L. Barias, SOLT.

== Economy ==
Poverty incidence of Milaor (%)

Source: Philippine Statistics Authority

Formerly a sleepy suburb of Naga City, the town has become one of the most commercialized municipalities along with Sipocot, Calabanga, Pili, Nabua and the nearby town of Canaman. This is mainly due to its proximity to Naga City's CBD II and Almeda CBD, and also its location along the Maharlika Highway. Milaor hosts large Warehouse companies such as CitiHardware, Olivan Depot, Atlantic Bakery, Milaor Trading Corporation, Milaor Cement Corp and others. The municipality has a provincial cockpit arena and several financial institutions such as BDO Network Bank and M Lhuillier.

Most people in the municipality are farmers and fishermen. However, since Milaor is close to Naga City (3 kilometers south), within the Manila-Naga road, and is the site of the upcoming Camarines Sur expressway, it has become a location of a great number of warehouses. Also because of its proximity to Naga City, it has become a population spillover, with many housing subdivisions being located, as well as entertainment centers. Camarines Sur Sports Arena is located in Brgy. Tarusanan.

Milaor was formerly included in the Metro Naga area before the designation was discontinued in 2017.

Typical agricultural produce includes:

- Corn
- Palay (rice)
- Coconut
- Wheat
- Mango

== Education ==
The Milaor-Gainza Schools District Office governs all educational institutions within the municipality. It oversees the management and operations of all private and public, from primary to secondary schools.

=== Primary and elementary schools ===
- Bal-Flor Elementary School
- Borongborongan Elementary School
- Cabugao Elementary School
- Capucnasan Elementary School
- Dalipay Elementary School
- Mary Nymph Montessori School
- Mayaopayawan Elementary School
- Maycatmon Elementary School
- Maydaso Elementary School
- Milaor Central School
- San Antonio Elementary School
- San Jose Elementary School
- Victory Nymph Montessori School

=== Secondary schools ===
- Global Site for IT Studies
- Milaor National High School
- Milaor National High School (Dalipay Annex High School)
- R.T. Subastil Memorial High School
- San Antonio National High School
