= Filipino-Japanese Friendship Landmark =

WWII memorial in Camarines Sur, Philippines

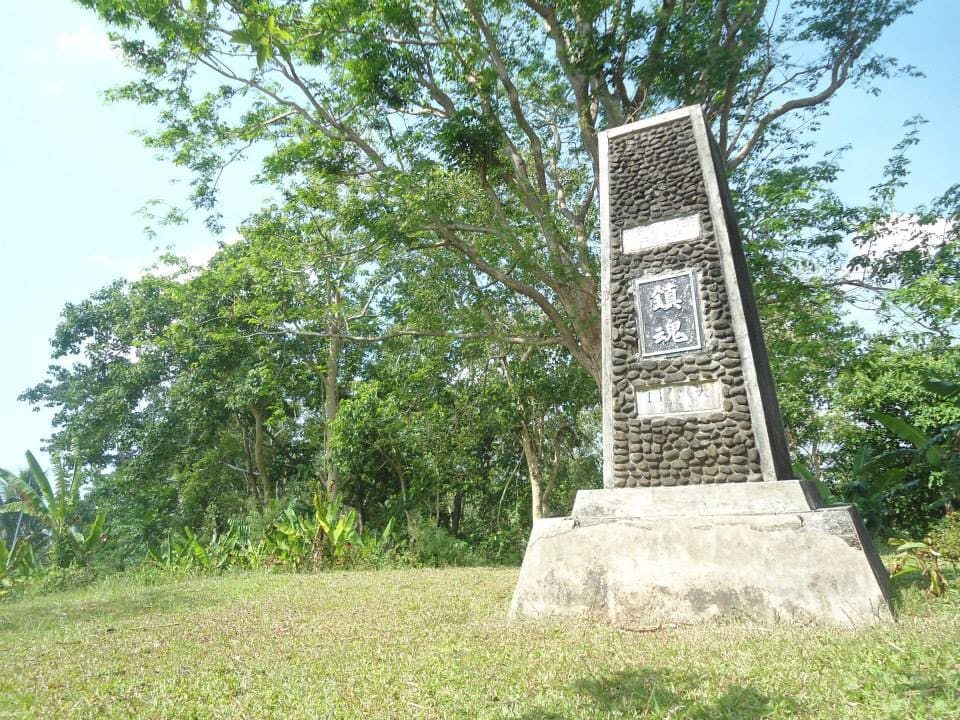
- Location: Bongcao Hill, Pili, Camarines Sur, Philippines
- Type: War memorial
- Completion date: 1985
- Dedicated to: End of Japanese occupation in the Bicol region Japan–Philippines relations

The Filipino-Japanese Friendship Landmark is a war memorial in Pili, Camarines Sur, Philippines. It is located at Mount Isarog in Sitio Bongcao of Barangay Curry.

During the Second World War, the Japanese Imperial Forces made a stronghold out of the natural caves found at Bongcao Hill at the foot of Mount Isarog and was the site of the Japanese last stand in the Bicol region in 1945.

A landmark was installed at the site through the joint efforts of the Isarog-Kai and then Camarines Sur Vice-Governor Jose B. Velarde and inaugurated on October 23, 1985, to commemorate the end of the war and the post-war Japan-Philippines relations.

== See also ==
- Philippine–Japanese Friendship Tower
