= Computer Science High School of Bicolandia =

Public school in Camarines Sur, Philippines

- Halangkaw na Paadalang Pang-Kompyuter na Siyensya nin Kabikolan
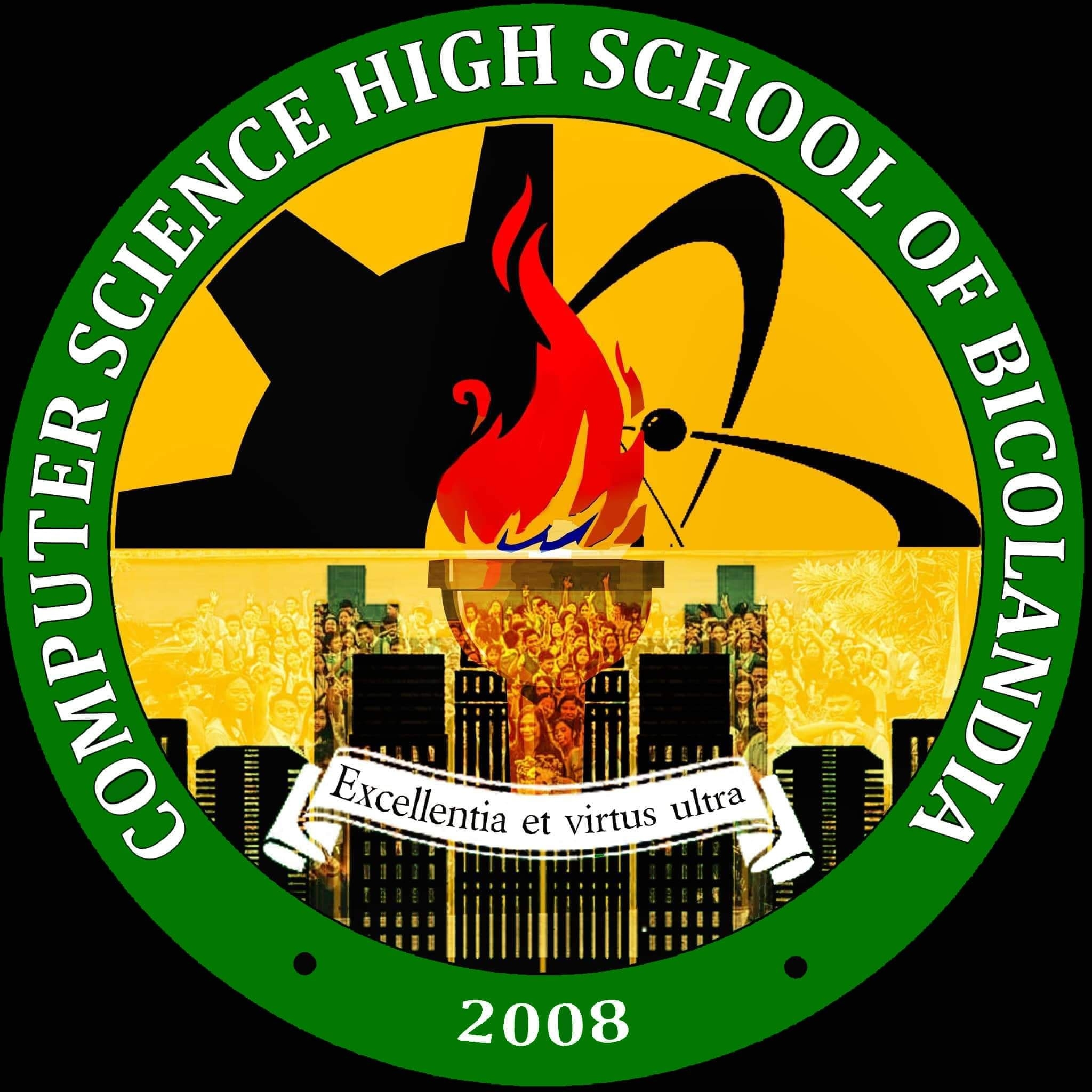

Location
- CBSUA Main Campus; Pili, Camarines Sur; Philippines
- Coordinates: 13°34′56″N 123°15′46″E

Information
- Former name: Bicolandia ICT-Oriented High School (2008)
- Type: Information and communications technology (ICT) high school, University-administered high school (2008-2015)
- Motto: Excellentia et virtus ultra
- Established: 2008
- Founder: Luis R. Villafuerte
- School district: 3rd District, Pili
- School Head: Marilyn M. Ligon
- Faculty: 14
- Grades: 7 to 10 (Junior High School)
- Colours: Green and Yellow
- Nickname: CSHSB, Shishbi, ICT
- Newspaper: The Hyperlink (2015-Present) and Ang Kawingan (2022-Present)
- Website: https://cshsb.edu.ph/

The Computer Science High School of Bicolandia, also referred to by its acronym CSHSB, is an information and communications technology (ICT) and junior high school in the capital town of Pili, Camarines Sur, Philippines.

Founded in 2008, it is a previously university-administered high school under the Central Bicol State University of Agriculture until 2015. At present, the school operates under the Department of Education with a specialized curriculum for ICT.

== History ==
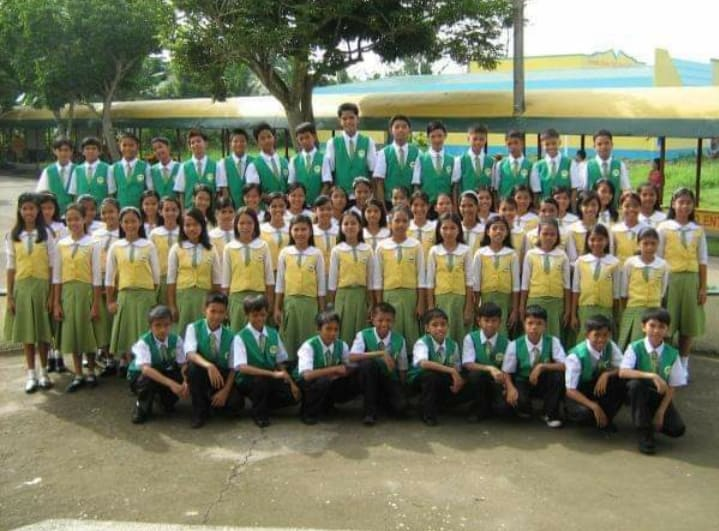
The Pioneer Batch (2008)

The Computer Science High School of Bicolandia (CSHSB) was founded in 2008 by way of RA 10284. It was initially named as Bicolandia ICT-Oriented High School. A few months later after its foundation, it was renamed to its current name.

The school was initiated by then Congressman of the Third District of Camarines Sur, Luis R. Villafuerte, in collaboration with Central Bicol State University of Agriculture, under the administration of its first University President, Atty. Marito T. Bernales.

Through the help of then Pili Mayor Alexis San Luis, top elementary graduate students across the capital town of Pili, Camarines Sur were invited to take the school's first entrance examination in 2008. The original intake was supposedly the top 70 students of the entrance examination and interview until the school administration decided to add another two slots. 72 students thus formed the pioneer batch of CSHSB.

The school was administered by Central Bicol State University of Agriculture (CBSUA) during its inception. It was initially administered from the university's Institute of Arts and Sciences (now the College of Arts and Sciences), until it was later transferred to the College of Development Education.

In 2009, CSHSB moved into its own building.

The school opened its year levels on a staggered basis, completing all year levels in SY 2011-2012. By the end of that school year, CSHSB produced its first batch of graduates.

In 2015, the administration of the school was transferred from CBSUA to the Department of Education. The school offered junior high school with the implementation of the K to 12 Basic Education Program by the Aquino Administration, starting from SY 2015-2016.

== Classes ==
=== Admissions ===
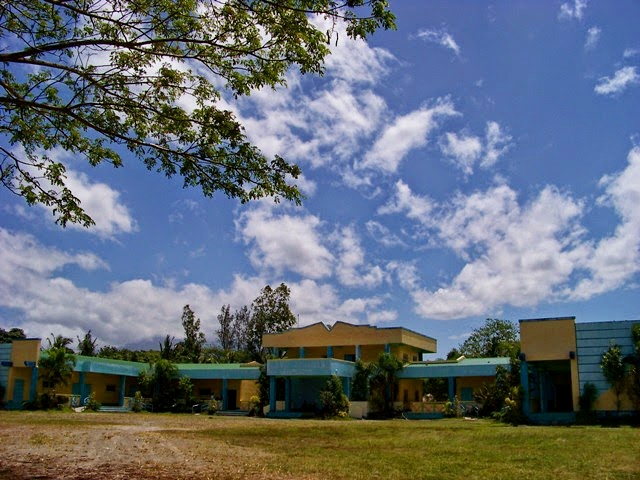
CSHSB Main Building

At present, CSHSB is a popular school of choice among elementary graduates from the town of Pili and the rest of Camarines Sur. The school requires passing an entrance examination followed by an interview for all prospective students. The top applicants will comprise the sections of Grade 7 which are the 7-Symbian, 7-Oracle, and 7-Android.

=== Sections ===
All grade levels have three (3) sections each. The current names of each section for all grade levels are listed below.

Grade 7	Grade 8	Grade 9	Grade 10
7-Symbian	8-Macintosh	9-Fedora	10-Chimera
7-Android	8-Redhat	9-Minix	10-Linux
7-Oracle	8-Unix	9-Solaris	10-Xenix

== Curriculum ==
The school's specialized ICT curriculum provides technical know-how on Computer Programming, Computer Animation, Computer Networking, Computer Troubleshooting, Web Development and other Computer Courses, for its Grade 7 up to Grade 10 students. It has two air-conditioned Computer laboratories kept with 1:1 student-computer ratio.

Along with the said specialized subject offerings, subjects like English, Math, Science, Filipino, Social Studies, Values Education, and MAPEH (Music, Arts, Physical Education and Health) are also offered for Grades 7 to 10. On the other hand, subjects like Technical Writing and Statistics, and advance lessons in Mathematics and Science are being taught in Grade 8 level while Research is offered for Grade 8 and Grade 9 students.

Meanwhile, additional skills like culinary, driving, swimming, and music will also be integrated to some related subjects.
