= Camsur Watersports Complex =

Watersports park in Bicol, Philippines

Coordinates: 13.59163°N 123.25328°E

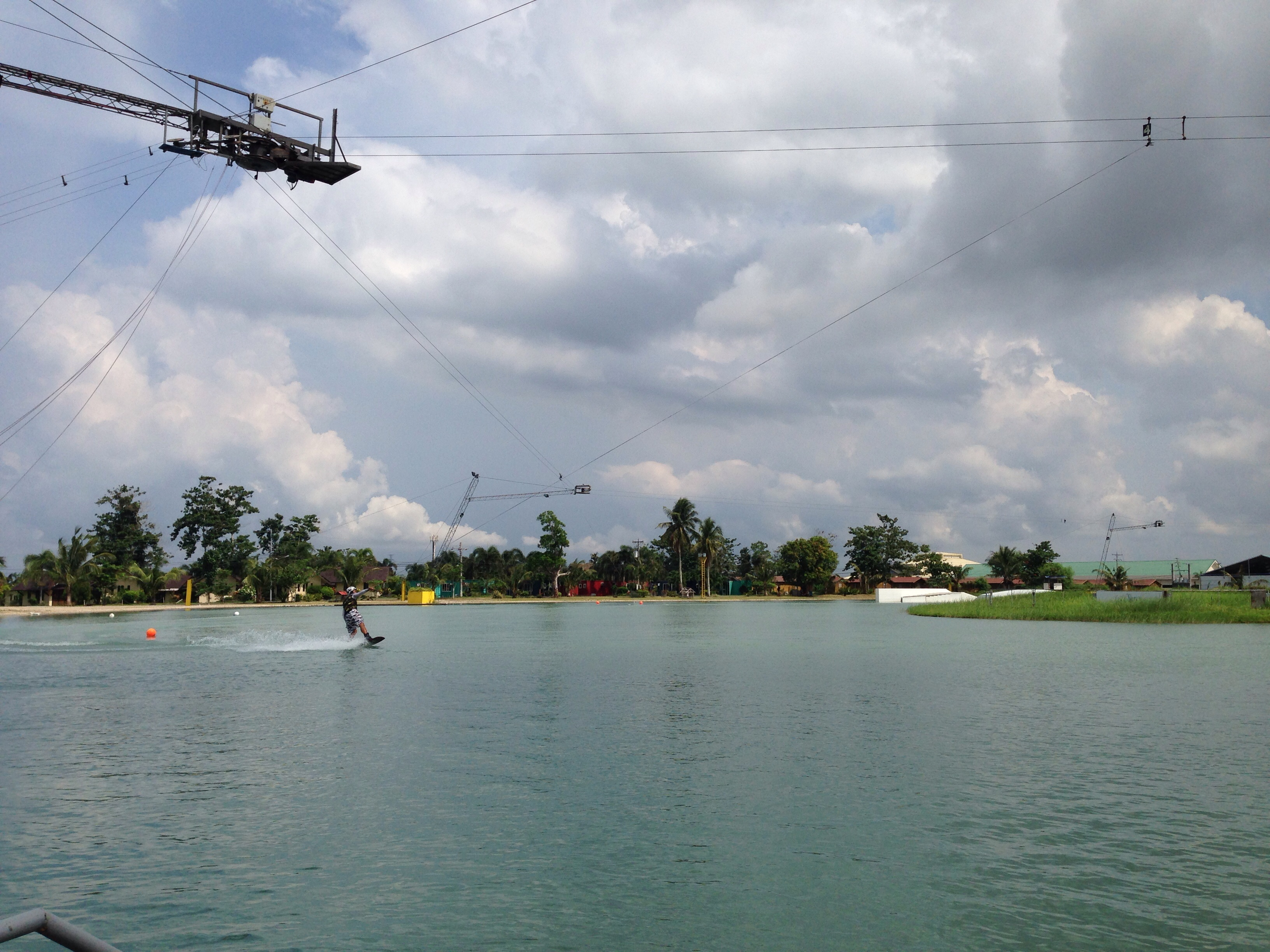
CWC in Pili, Camarines Sur, Philippines

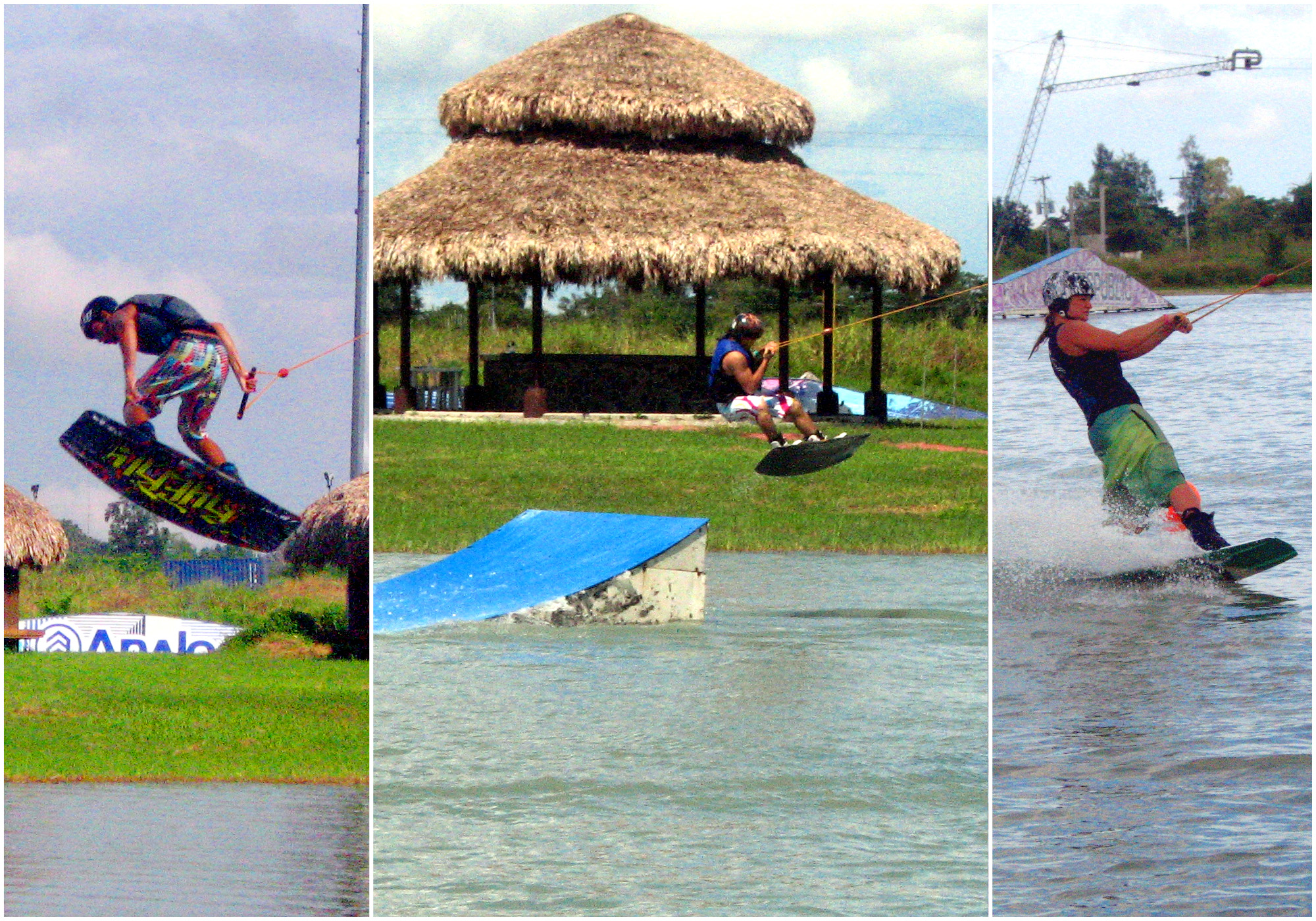
Wakeboarders at Camsur Watersports Complex, Pili, Camarines Sur, Philippines

Camsur Watersports Complex or Camarines Sur Watersports Complex is a watersports park designed for wakeboarding, wakeskating and waterskiing. Owned by the second degree grandson of former Hon. Luis Villafuerte, Juan Miguel Villafuerte, and operated by Republic Wakeparks Inc. It is located within the Provincial Capitol Complex, Cadlan, Pili, Camarines Sur. Former The province of Camarines Sur, situated in southeastern part of Luzon is found in the Philippines, Southeast Asia.
