= Cimarrones Festival =

Annual cultural festival in Pili, Philippines

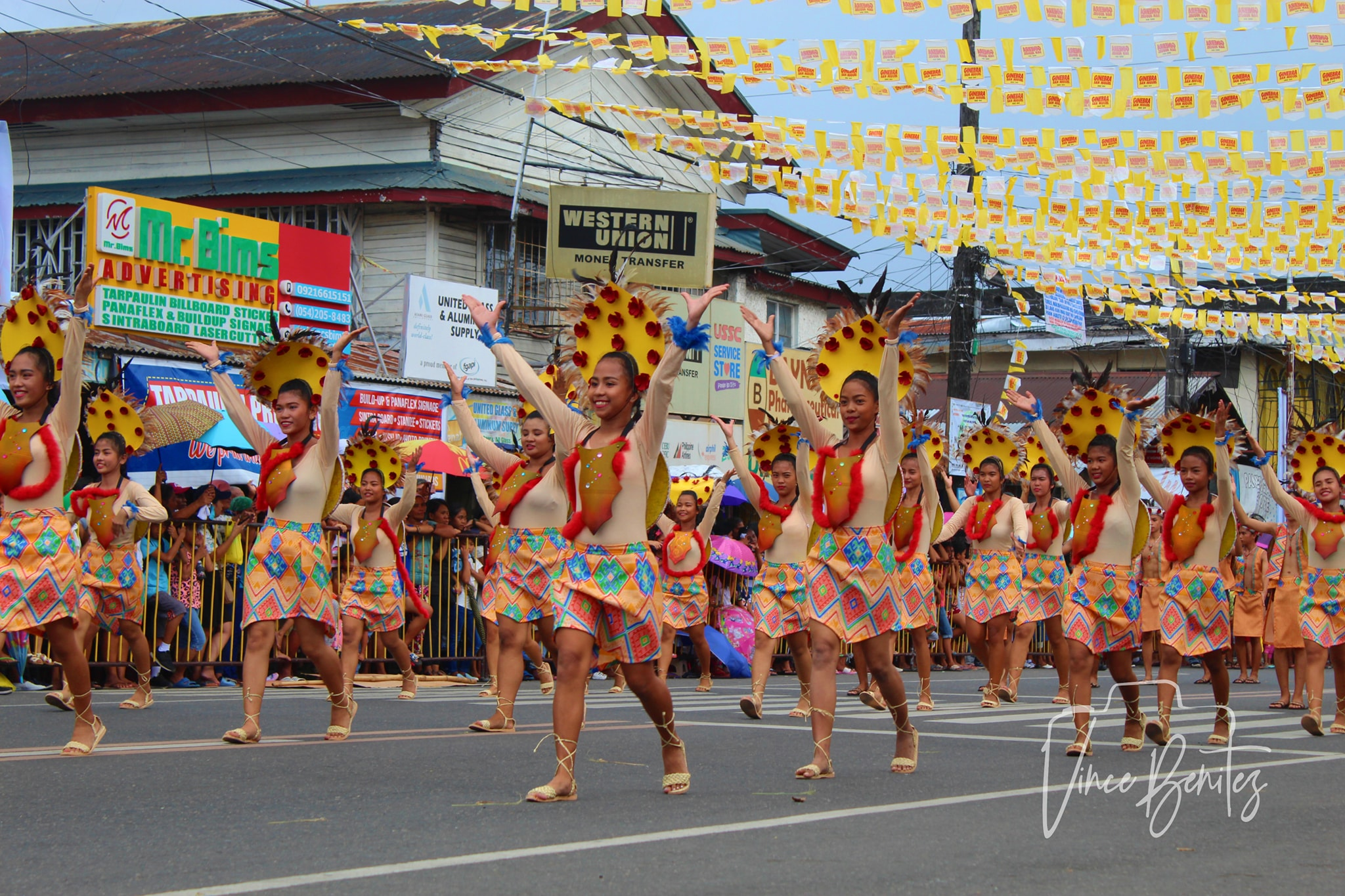
- Street dancing competition, part of Cimarrones Festival celebration.
- Observed by: Pili
- Type: Religious / Cultural
- Date: October 23–24

The Cimarrones Festival is an annual festival, both religious and cultural celebration held in the municipality of Pili, Camarines Sur in the Philippines. The festival coincides with the feast of San Rafael Archangel, the town’s patron saint, and is traditionally celebrated every October 23–24. It is hosted by the Municipal Government of Pili and celebrated primarily in the Pili Centro District, which is composed of six barangays.

The festival highlights the town’s Christian heritage and indigenous history, particularly honoring the Cimarrones—a group of native warriors who resisted Spanish colonization in the Bicol Region. Throughout the month of October, various cultural, civic, and sporting activities are conducted as part of the celebration.

Through Presidential Proclamation No. 685, October 24, 2024 was declared a special non-working holiday in Pili, Camarines Sur, to commemorate the Cimarrones Festival.

== Etymology ==
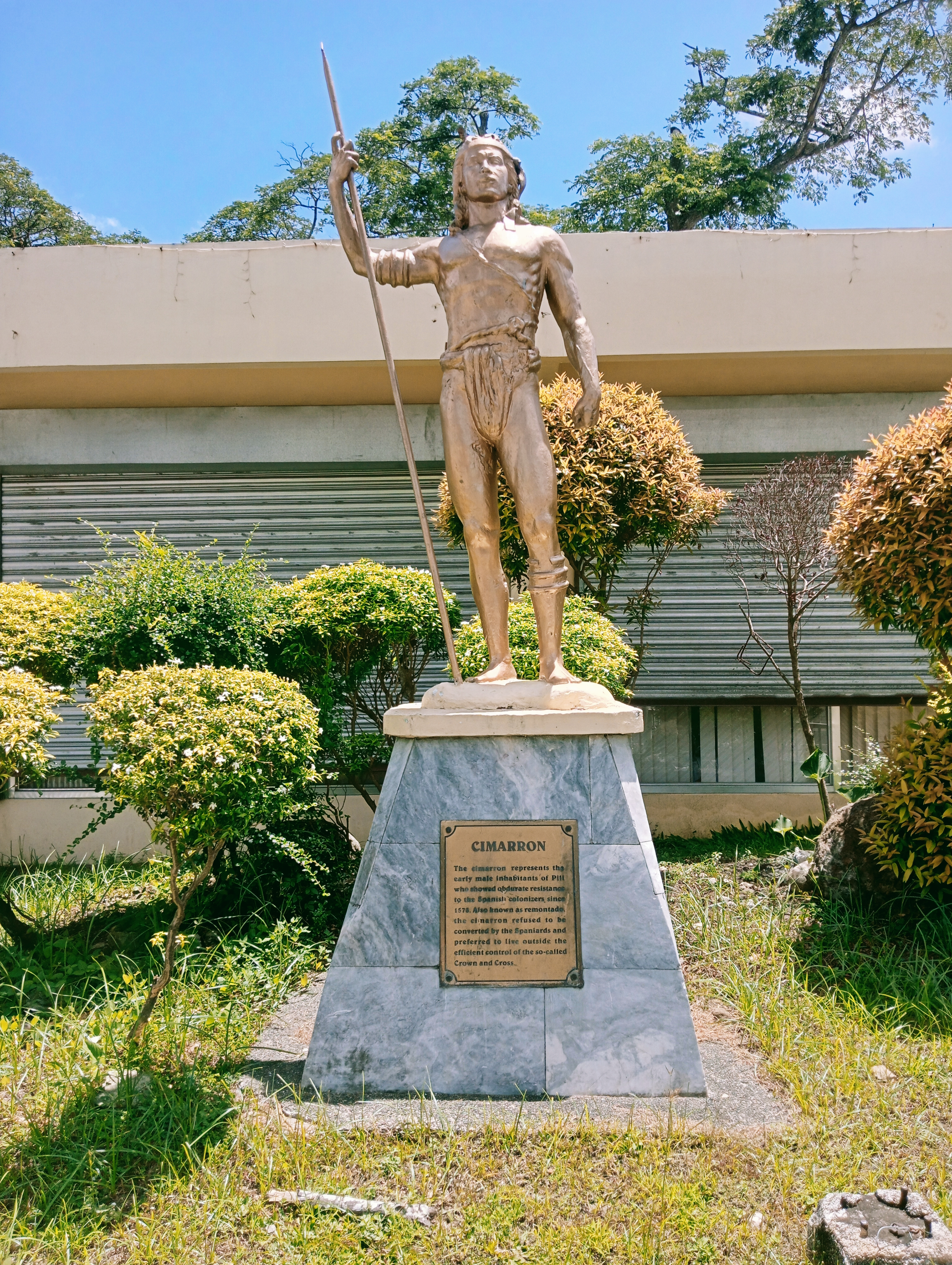
Cimarron Monument

The word "Cimarrones" came from during the promulgation of Christianity in the early 1770s by the Spanish missionaries, when the town houses the “Cimarrones” or the “Remontados” who resisted the foreign rule of the neighboring Hispanic city of Nueva Caceres (which is now Naga City). The early center of settlement in the town was located in "Binanuaanan" (from "banwaan" which means town in the Bikol language) until missionaries transferred it to the present site of the town proper where the St. Raphael Archangel Church is located.

== History ==
The term Cimarrones originates from the Spanish word meaning “wild” or “untamed.” It was used by the Spaniards to describe indigenous groups who refused to submit to colonial rule and took refuge in the mountainous areas of Mount Isarog, Siruma, and Caramoan in the Bicol Region. These groups were known for their resilience, independence, and combat skills, earning a reputation for launching raids on lowland settlements that cooperated with Spanish authorities.

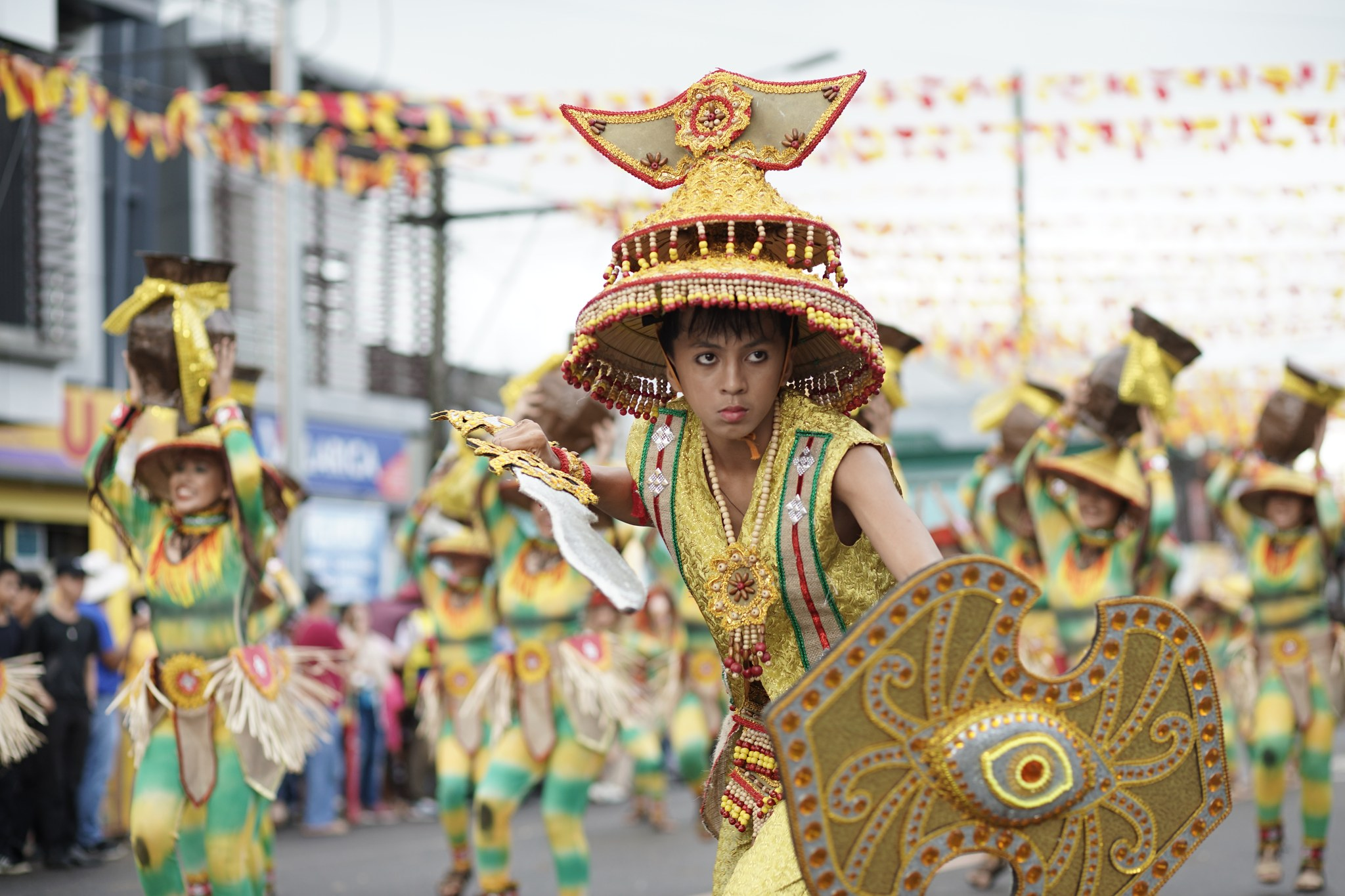
Portraying a Cimarrones Festival King, head of the tribes.

The Cimarrones lived by farming and hunting and were credited with developing the minasbad, a bladed weapon used in both warfare and agriculture, as well as a distinct martial art known as Cimarron Arnis. In time, many members of these communities were converted to Christianity and became among the early devotees of Our Lady of Peñafrancia, the patroness of Bicolandia.

== Christianity in Pili ==
Christianity reached Pili around 1770, when the town’s original settlement was located in Binanauan. The community was later transferred to its current site, where a church dedicated to Saint Raphael the Archangel was constructed in 1819. Fr. Antonio Andres served as its first parish priest. Since then, Saint Raphael has been venerated as the patron saint of Pili, and the annual town fiesta continues to honor his name and legacy.

== Modern Festival Origins ==
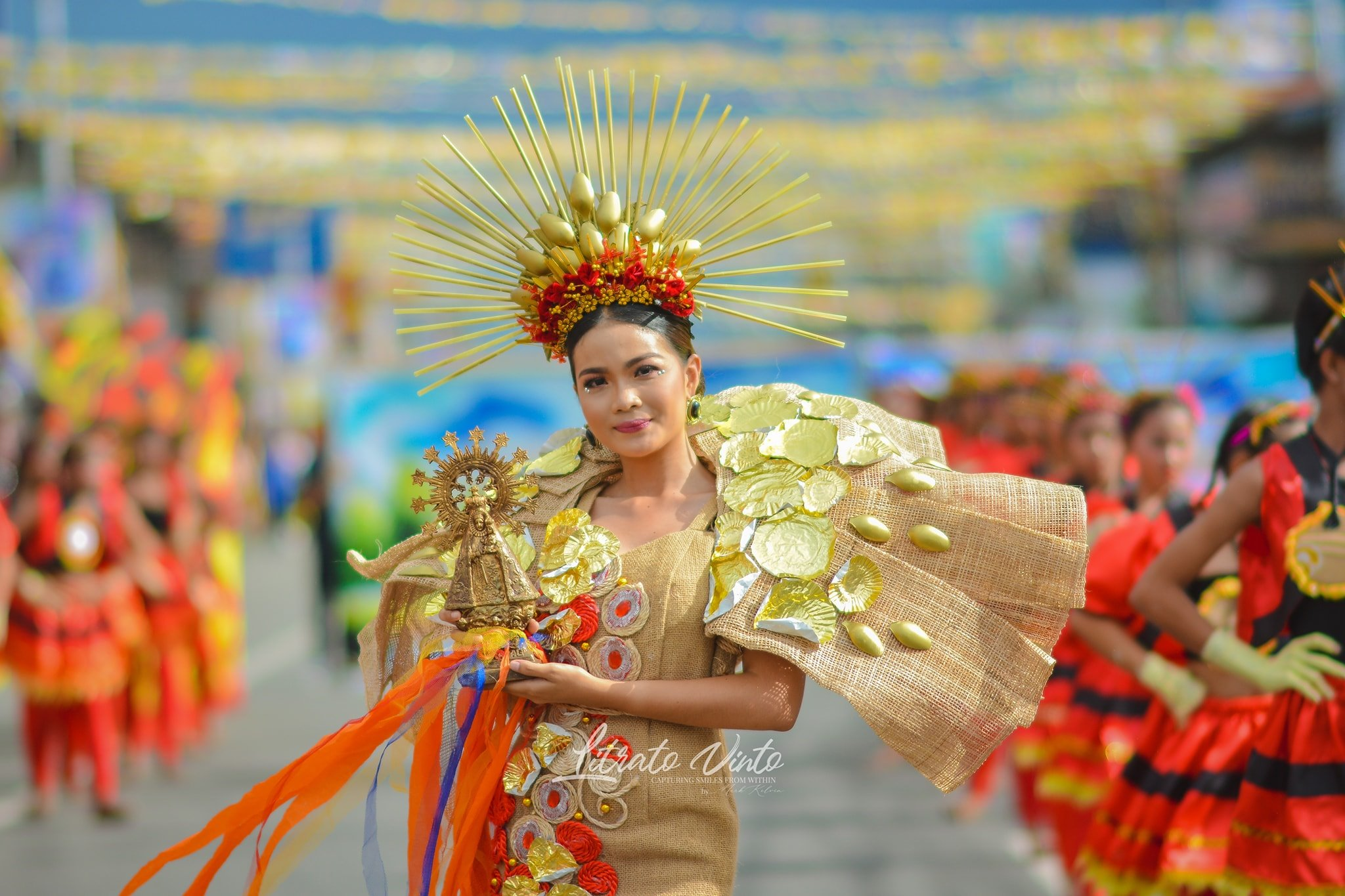
Cimarrones Festival Queen holding the image of Our Lady of Peñafrancia

The Cimarrones Festival was first celebrated in 1998, founded by then–Mayor Tomas P. Bongalonta Jr. The festival has been recognized and promoted by the Department of Tourism and the Tourism Promotions Board Philippines as one of the notable cultural events in the region. In its inaugural year, Mayor Bongalonta spearheaded the revival of Pili’s local culture and history by encouraging public schools across the municipality to stage street dancing performances inspired by the Cimarrones tribes and their traditions. This initiative formally established the Cimarrones Festival as a major annual celebration in the municipality of Pili.

The festival soon evolved into a large-scale celebration featuring cultural presentations, sports tournaments, civic parades, and other community events, symbolizing both the town’s historical identity and modern progress.

== Festival Activities ==
The Cimarrones Festival is celebrated through a series of religious, cultural, and recreational events organized throughout the month of October.

·Religious activities dedicated to Saint Raphael the Archangel, including processions and novenas

·Street dancing competitions, featuring “Cimarrones dancers” from different schools interpreting indigenous-inspired choreography

·Cultural presentations that showcase Pili’s local heritage and artistic traditions

·Sports tournaments and youth-centered programs such as the Pili Youth Festival

·Socio-civic and military parades, including majorette and marching band competitions

·The annual Miss Capital Town beauty pageant.

== Miss Capital Town ==
Miss Capital Town
- Type: Beauty pageant
- Headquarters: Pili, Camarines Sur, Philippines

Miss Capital Town is an annual local beauty pageant organized by the Local Government Unit of Pili. It serves as one of the highlights of Pili’s annual town fiesta held every October, celebrating beauty, talent, and cultural pride. Miss Capital Town stands as Pili’s most notable pageant and the Capital's most awaited event every Cimarrones Festival.

Year	Miss Capital Town	Barangay	Ref
2026	Jessica Mae Regullano	San Vicente	
2025	Lisa Mae General	San Jose	
2024	Kim Vianice Mae Pilarte	Anayan	
2023	Reinsfer Krizhette Ranara	San Agustin	
2022	Julie Eleonor Estrada	Anayan	
