= Milaor Church =

Roman Catholic church in Camarines Sur, Philippines

- Saint Joseph the Worker Parish Church
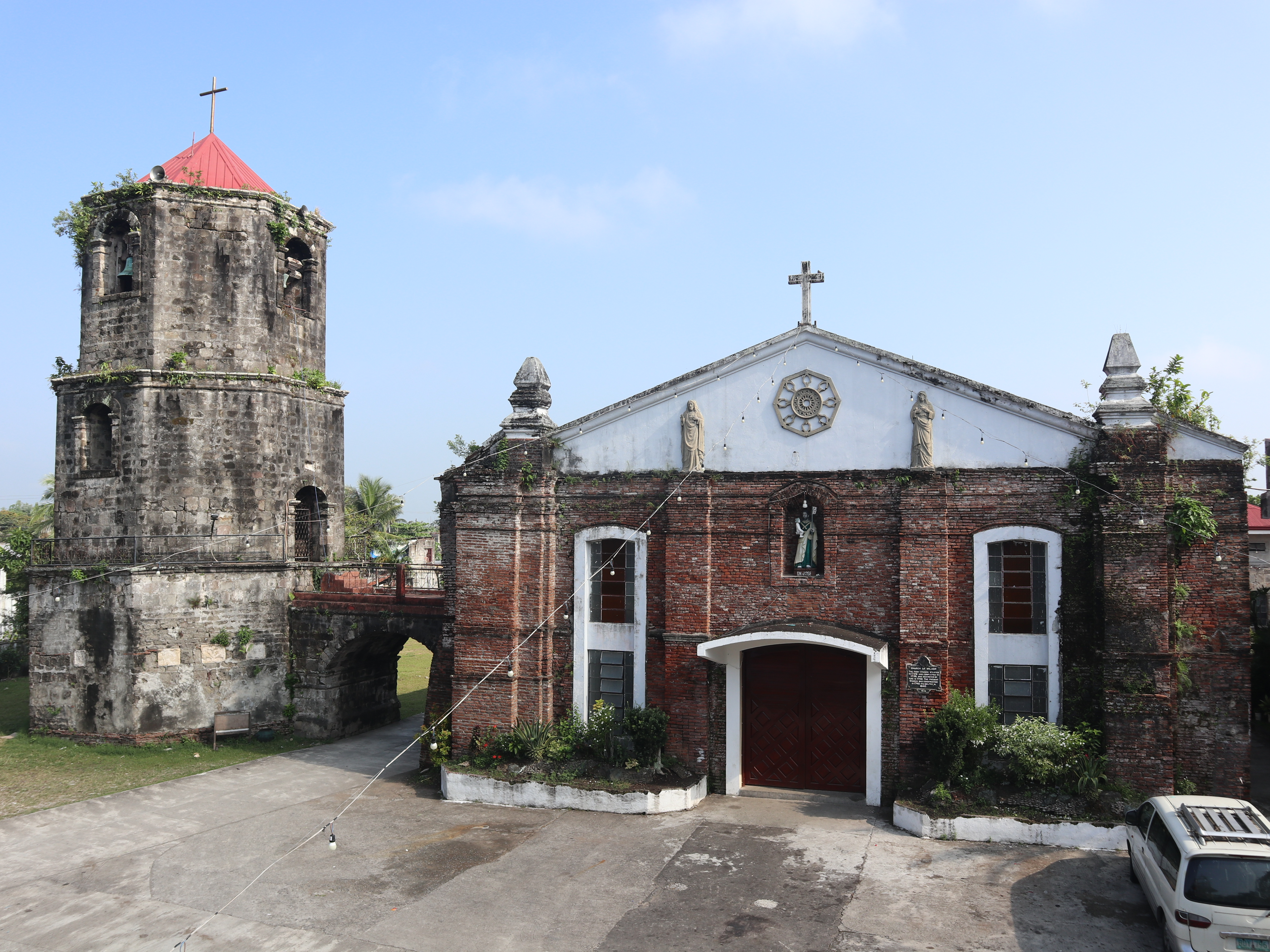
- Church facade in 2023

- Location in Luzon Location in the Philippines
- 13°35′46″N 123°10′38″E
- Location: Milaor, Camarines Sur
- Country: Philippines
- Denomination: Roman Catholic

History
- Status: Parish church
- Dedication: Joseph

Architecture
- Functional status: Active
- Heritage designation: National Historical Landmark
- Designated: 1939
- Architectural type: Church building
- Completed: 1740; 286 years ago

Administration
- Diocese: Libmanan

Saint Joseph the Worker Parish Church, commonly known as Milaor Church, is a Roman Catholic church located in Milaor, Camarines Sur, Philippines. It is under the jurisdiction of the Diocese of Libmanan.

The Franciscans built the church and completed it in 1740. A belfry was added in 1840.

The National Historical Commission of the Philippines declared the church a national historical landmark in 1939.

== Gallery ==
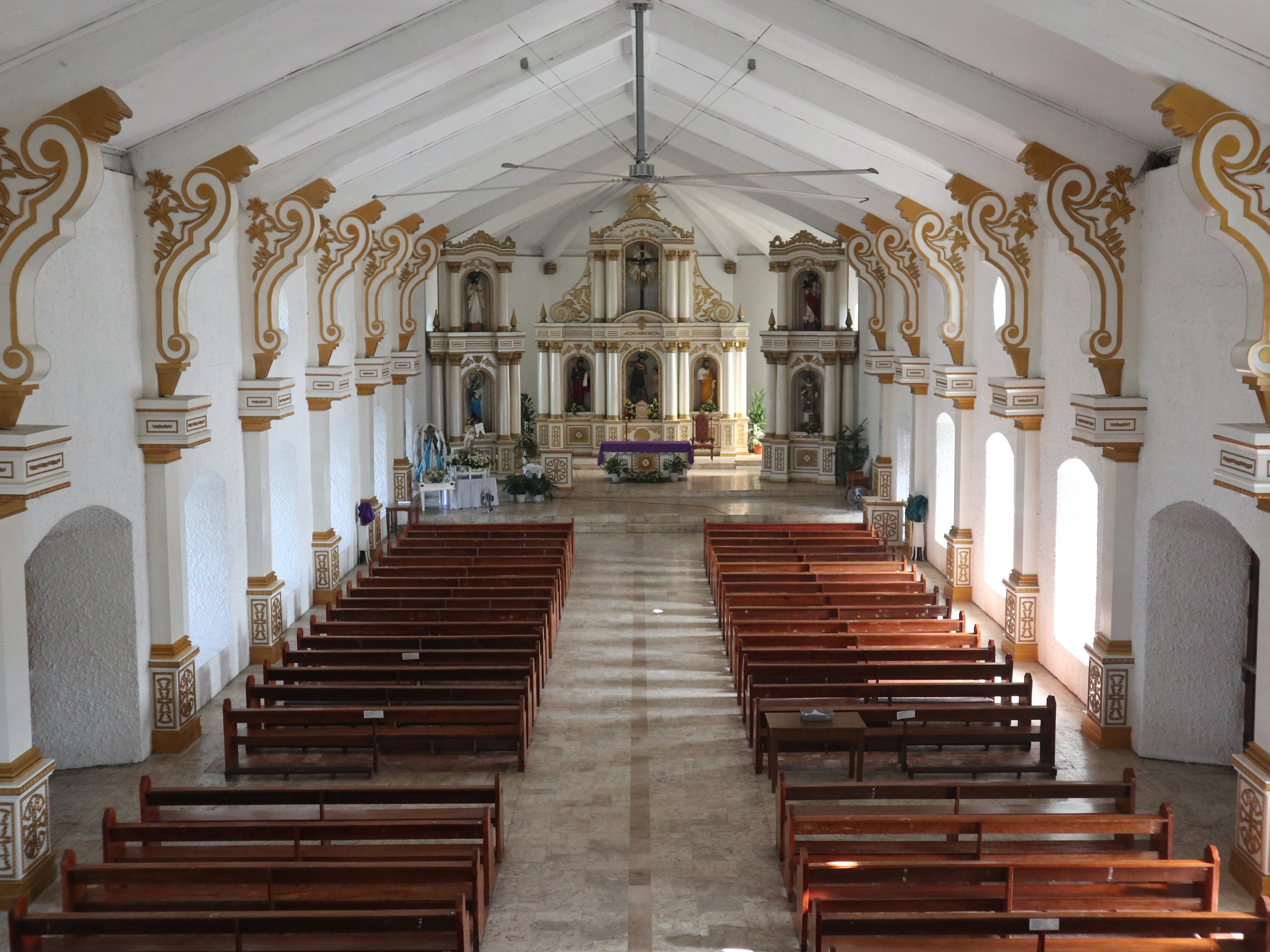
Church interior in 2023

Back of the church

Church PHC historical marker installed in 1939

Bell tower
