= Pili, Camarines Sur =

Capital of Camarines Sur, Philippines

Pili
- Municipality
- Municipality of Pili
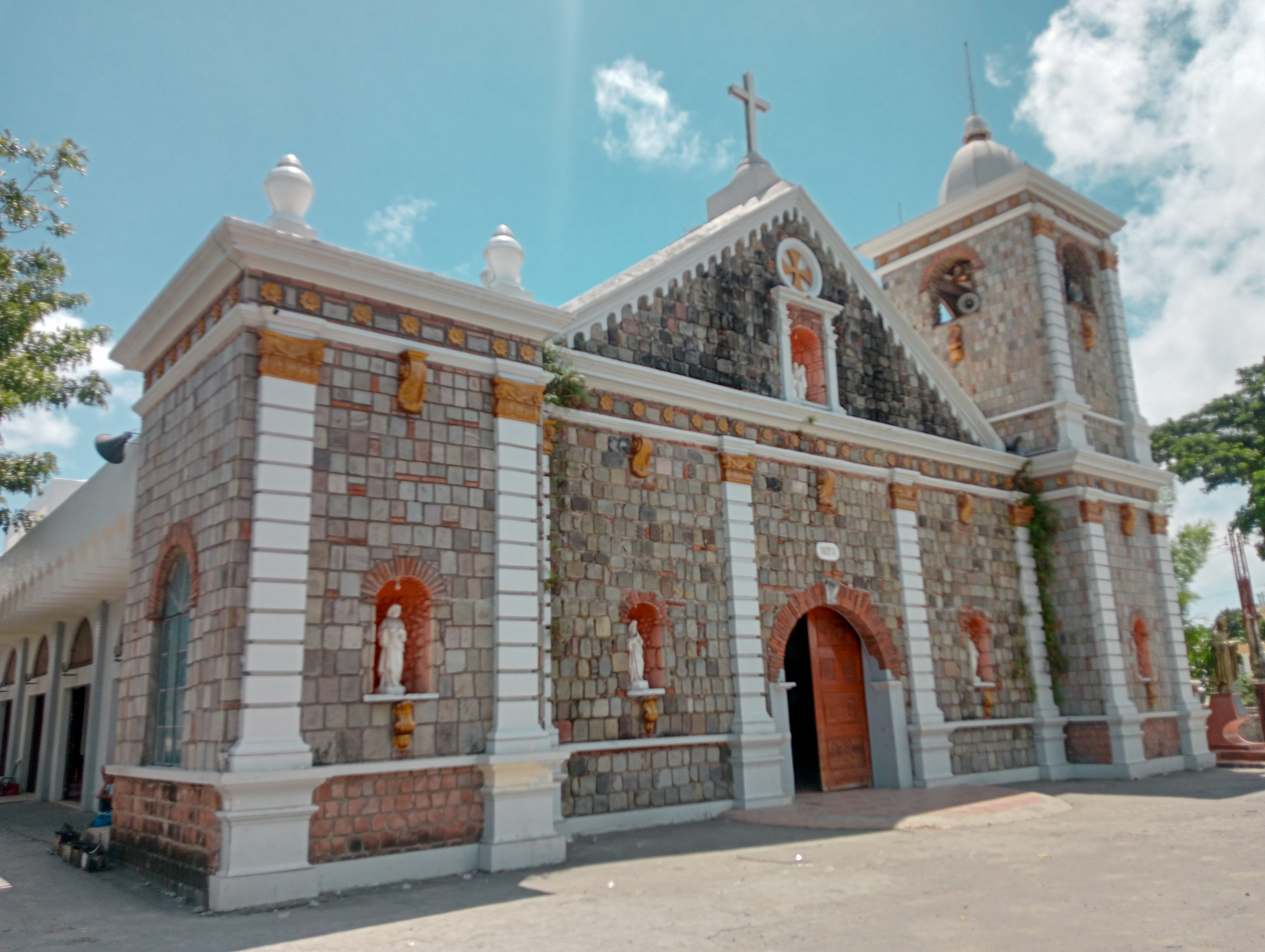
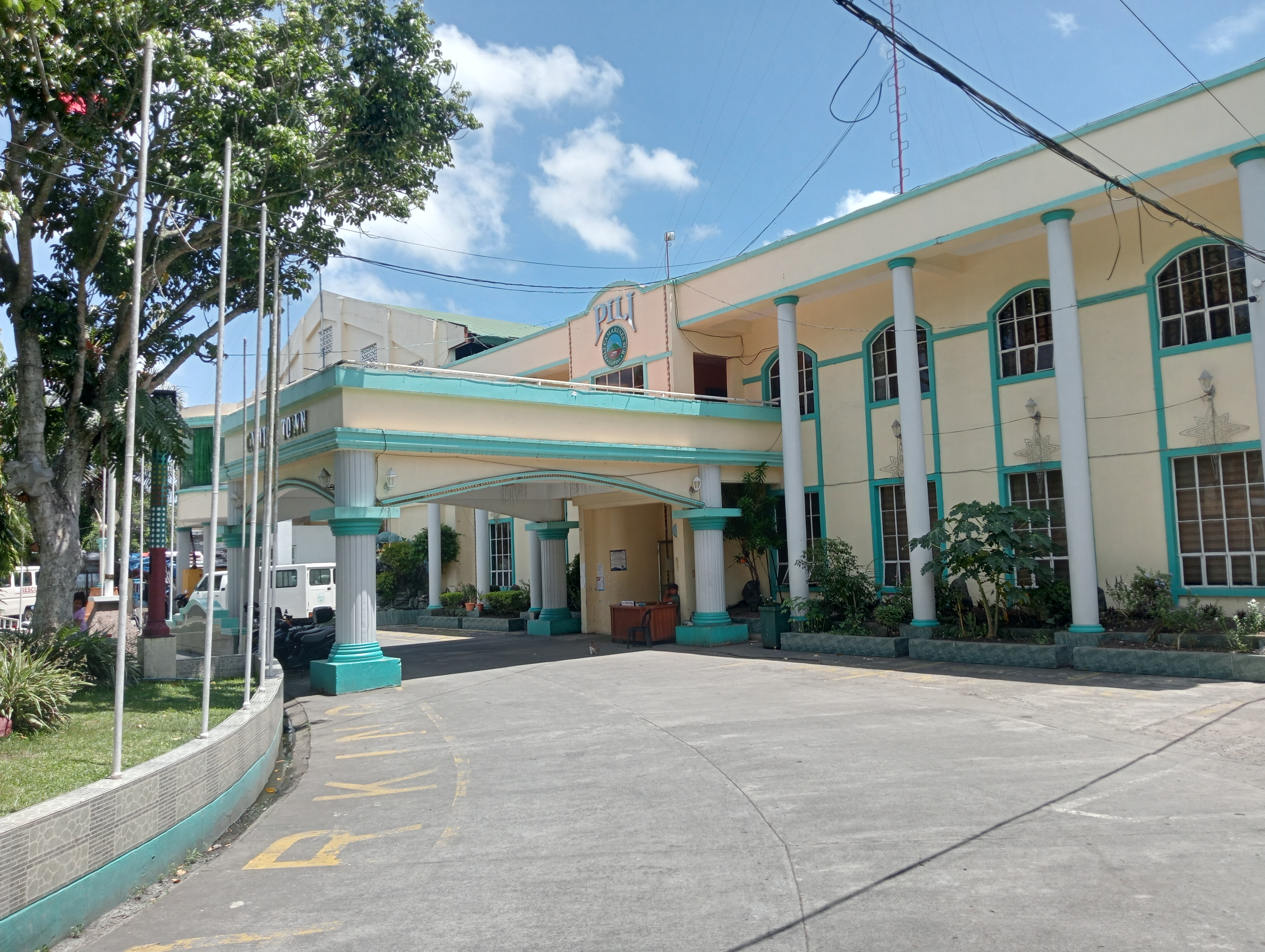
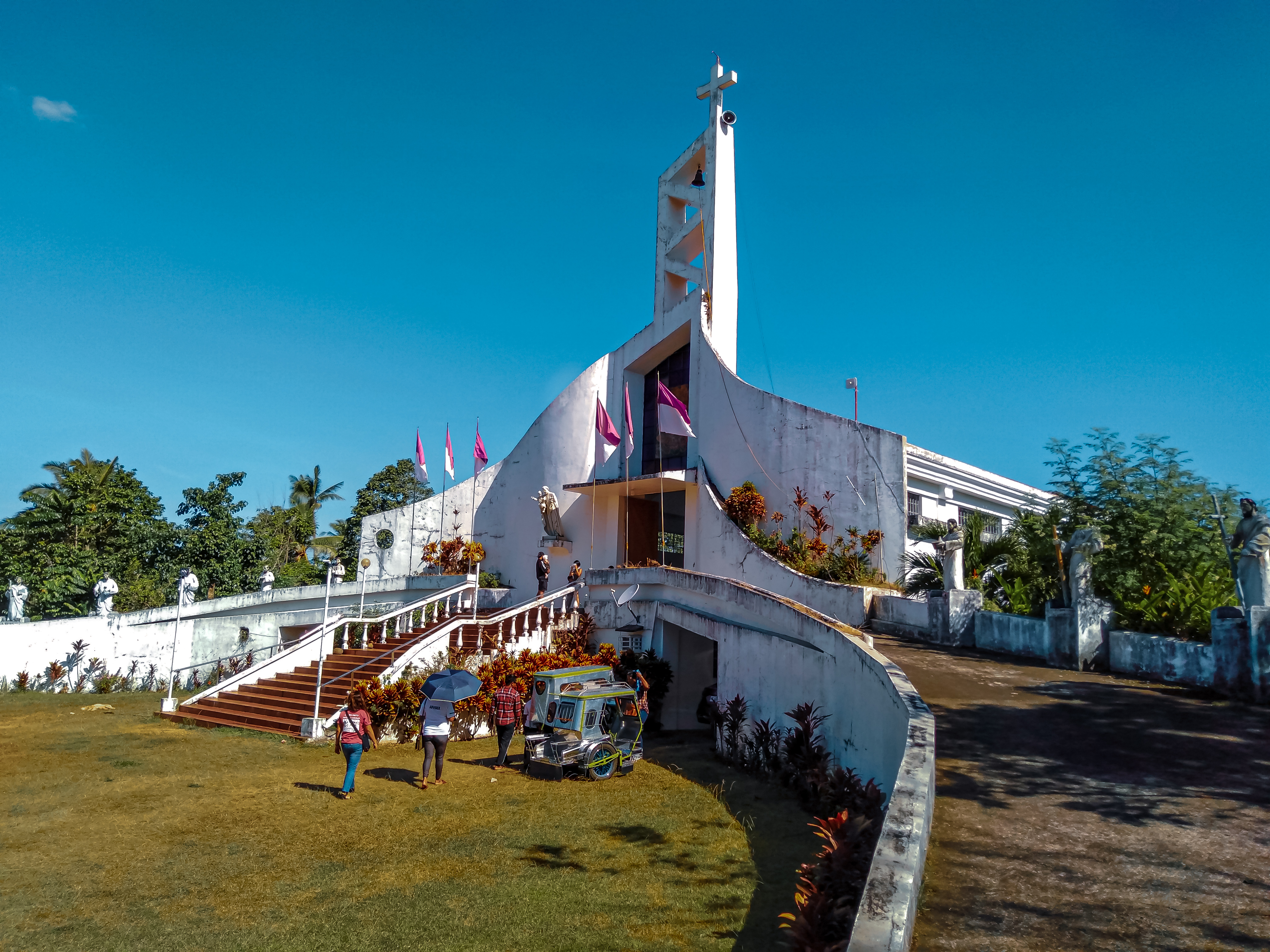
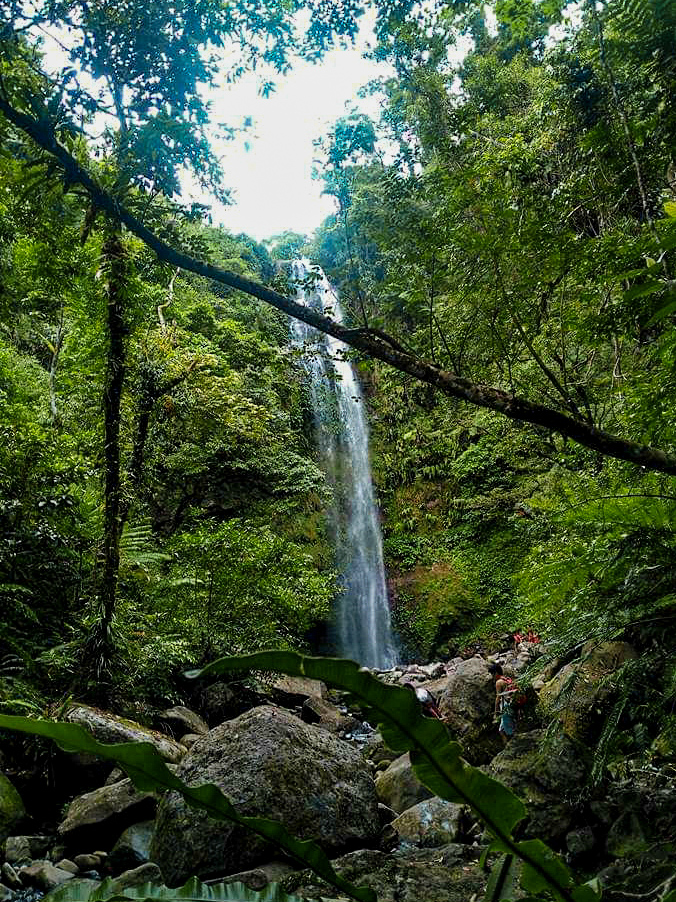
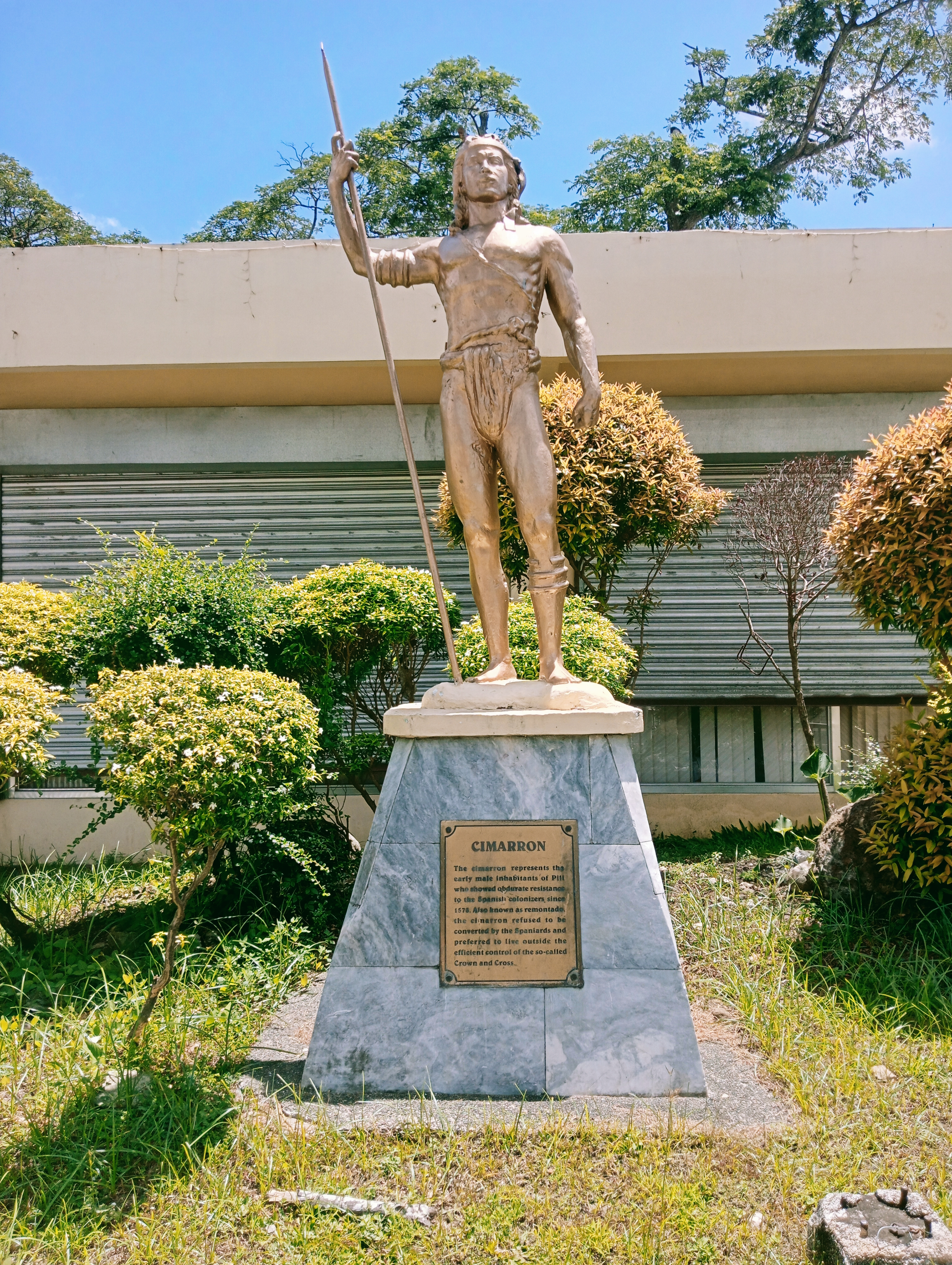
- Clockwise from top: St. Raphael the Archangel Parish, Pili Municipal Hall, Balang (Shower) Falls, Our Lady of Remedies Church, Cimarron Monument

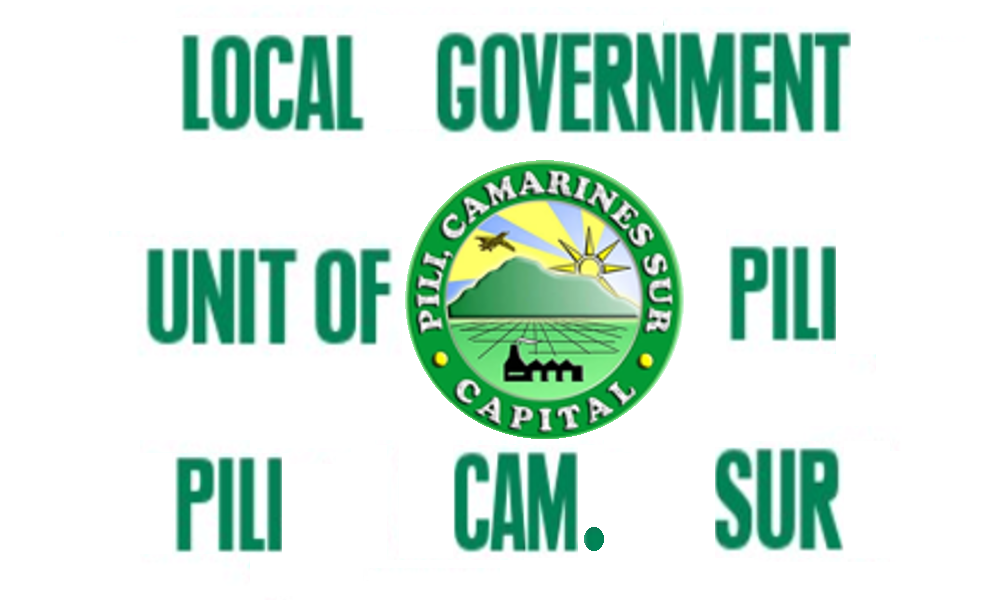
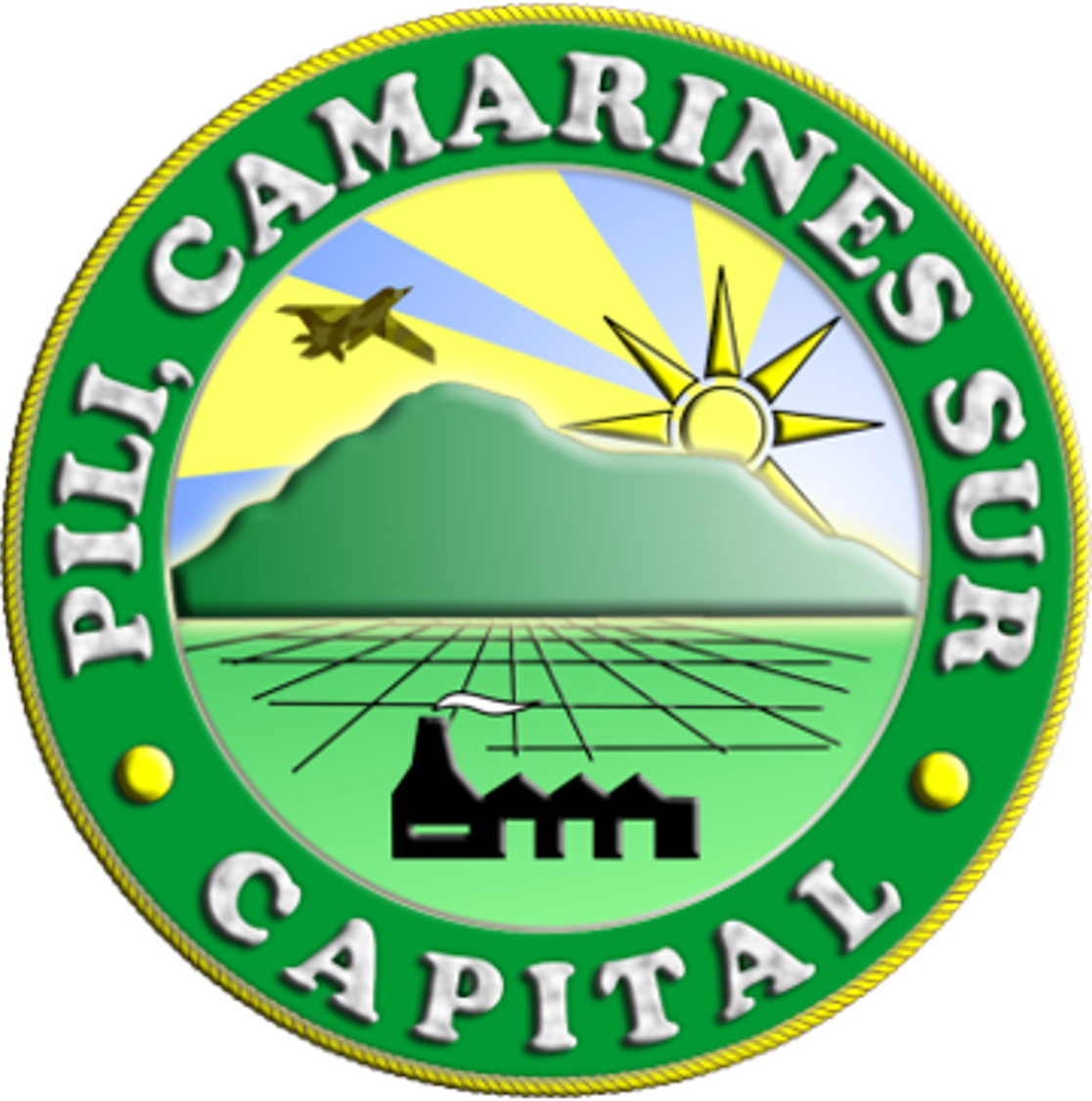
- Flag Seal
- Nickname: Capital of Camarines Sur
- Motto: "Enot Pili"
- Map of Camarines Sur with Pili highlighted
- Interactive map of Pili
- Location within the Philippines
- Coordinates: 13°33′15″N 123°16′31″E
- Country: Philippines
- Region: Bicol Region
- Province: Camarines Sur
- District: 3rd district
- Founded: 1789
- Barangays: 26 (see Barangays)

Government
  - Type: Sangguniang Bayan
  - Mayor: Marivic B. Solano
  - Vice Mayor: Tomas P. Bongalonta Jr.
  - Representative: Nelson S. Legacion
  - Municipal Council: Members: Lone District; Nicheta N. Malate; Maria Lourdes D. Baltazar; Benito D. Regondola; Ronaldo P. Boclot; Maria Roxan R. Nayles; Maria Mercedita C. Violeta; Romeo S. Salazar; Narcel S. Lopez
  - Electorate: 58,919 voters (2025)

Area
  - Total: 122.6 km^{2} (47.3 sq mi)
- Elevation: 33 m (108 ft)
- Highest elevation: 155 m (509 ft)
- Lowest elevation: 8 m (26 ft)

Population (2024 census)
  - Total: 101,668
  - Density: 829.3/km^{2} (2,148/sq mi)
  - Households: 21,266
- 100,091
- Demonym: Piliño(s)

Economy
  - Income class: 1st municipal income class
  - Poverty incidence: 20.56% (2023)
  - Revenue: ₱ 475.3 million (2024)
  - Assets: ₱ 1,108 million (2024)
  - Expenditure: ₱ 390.9 million (2024)
  - Liabilities: ₱ 263.3 million (2024)

Service provider
  - Electricity: Camarines Sur 2 Electric Cooperative (CASURECO 2)
  - Water: Pili Water District (PIWAD)
- Time zone: UTC+8 (PST)
- ZIP code: 4418
- PSGC: 0501728000
- IDD : area code: +63 (0)54
- Native languages: Central Bikol; Tagalog
- Website: www.pili.gov.ph

Pili, officially the Municipality of Pili (Central Bikol: Banwaan kan Pili, Rinconada Bikol: Banwaan ka Pili, Tagalog: Bayan ng Pili) is a municipality and capital of the province of Camarines Sur, Philippines. According to the 2024 census, it has a population of 101,668 people.

It is widely known for its pili nuts, a local product associated with Bicolano culture, used in food products such as candied pili, pili tarts, and pili butter.

== History ==
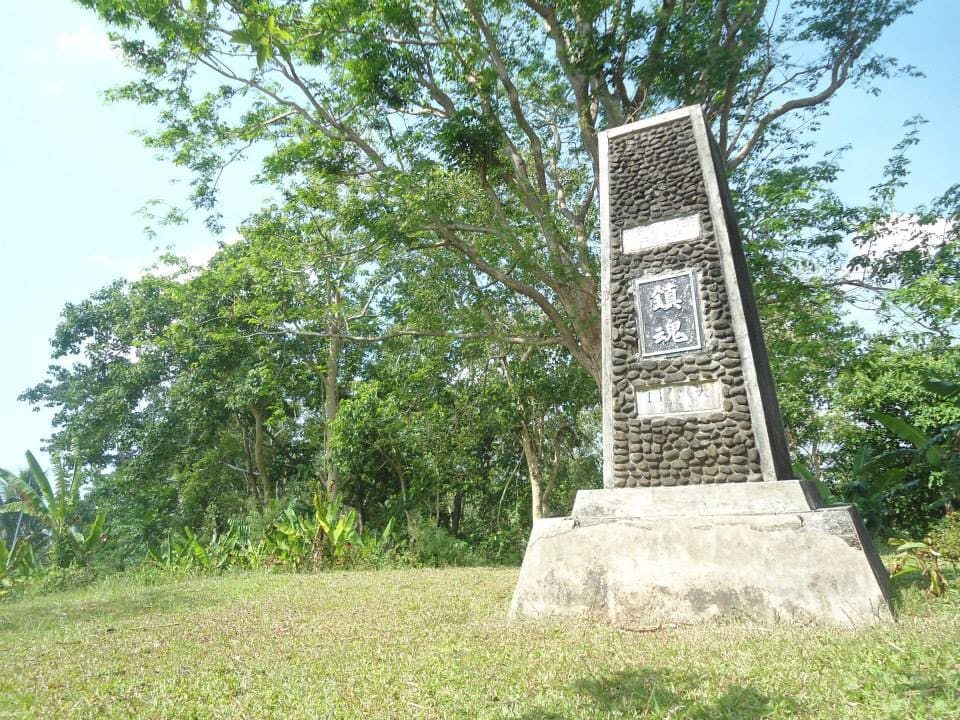
The Filipino-Japanese Friendship Landmark is located at Mt. Isarog, Sitio Boncao, Barangay Curry

The first recorded history of Pili started during the promulgation of Christianity in the early 1770s by the Spanish missionaries, when the town houses the Cimarrones or the Remontados who resisted the foreign rule of the neighboring Hispanic city of Nueva Caceres. The early center of settlement in the town was located in "Binanuaanan" (from banwaan which means town in the Bikol language) until missionaries transferred it to the present site of the town proper where the St. Raphael Archangel Church is located.

The Americans established the town of Pili in 1901. The name of the town has many disputed etymologies, either it came from the Bicol Region's Pili nut (Canarium ovatum) or from the Bicol word “pili” or “to choose”. The latter is because the Americans wanted to make the town as the new provincial urban center due to the fact that Naga which the Spaniards had developed was prone to major floods. The town is also a very strategic location for the Americans. Pili connects the major districts of the province: the Bikol Naga-speaking towns of the North, Partido Area, and the Rinconada Area. It was here where they build the current Naga Airport and the Camarines Sur Agricultural School in 1918 which is now the main campus of the Central Bicol State University of Agriculture. Pili was formally established in 1919 as a municipality.

When World War II broke out in 1941 the Imperial Japanese Army sent 3,000 soldiers to Pili due to the concentration of American developments in the town. They built tunnels, manmade caves, and foxholes all over the town which are still existent in the town today. The infrastructures of the war were mostly in the barangays of Cadlan, Curry, San Jose and even in the Centro area. When the Japanese started to lose, they flee to Mount Isarog to hide. They created a lot of holes in Mount Isarog and used the mountain as their last stand in the Bicol Region. In the present, the heroes of the war were remembered through Filipino-Japanese Friendship Historical Landmark in Sitio Bongcao, Curry at the foot of Mount Isarog.

When Naga was declared as a chartered city, there is a need to search for the next provincial capital. Former Governor Juan F. Trivino chose the Pili as its capital. Finally on June 6, 1955, Pili was declared as the provincial capital by virtue of R.A. 1336, replacing Naga. The new site for the provincial capitol was the 150 ha (370 acres) lot donation of Don Susano Rodriguez in the barangay of Cadlan.

== Geography ==
The town is 450 kilometres (280 mi) from the country's capital city of Manila.

=== Barangays ===
Pili is politically subdivided into 26 barangays. Each barangay consists of puroks and some have sitios.

- Municipal center and Poblacion
- Poblacion
- Barangay

PSGC	Barangay	Class	Population (2020)	Population (2024)	Annual growth rate (2020–2024)
051728001	Anayan	Urban	3,379	2,943	▼ −3.39%
051728002	Bagong Sirang	Rural	3,277	3,157	▼ −0.93%
051728003	Binanwaanan	Rural	5,188	4,931	▼ −1.26%
051728004	Binobong	Rural	2,780	2,776	▼ −0.04%
051728005	Cadlan	Urban	6,000	6,069	▲0.29%
051728006	Caroyroyan	Urban	7,594	6,225	▼ −4.85%
051728007	Curry	Rural	2,584	2,914	▲3.05%
051728008	Del Rosario	Rural	3,090	3,853	▲5.67%
051728009	Himaao	Urban	4,832	4,482	▼ −1.86%
051728010	La Purisima	Urban	3,210	3,212	▲0.02%
051728011	New San Roque	Urban	3,946	3,737	▼ −1.35%
051728012	Old San Roque	Urban	942	1,027	▲2.18%
051728013	Palestina	Urban	6,024	4,747	▼ −5.78%
051728014	Pawili	Rural	2,418	3,136	▲6.72%
051728015	Sagrada	Rural	3,294	3,436	▲1.06%
051728016	Sagurong	Rural	2,765	3,141	▲3.24%
051728017	San Agustin	Urban	5,722	5,880	▲0.68%
051728018	San Antonio	Rural	1,339	1,761	▲7.09%
051728019	San Isidro	Urban	2,244	2,063	▼ −2.08%
051728020	San Jose	Urban	13,339	17,519	▲7.05%
051728021	San Juan	Rural	2,096	1,622	▼ −6.21%
051728022	San Vicente	Urban	2,116	2,281	▲1.89%
051728023	Santiago	Urban	2,511	2,498	▼ −0.13%
051728024	Santo Niño	Rural	1,249	1,398	▲2.86%
051728025	Tagbong	Urban	3,872	4,250	▲2.36%
051728026	Tinangis	Rural	3,385	2,610	▼ −6.29%
TOTAL			99,196	101,668	▲0.61%

=== Climate ===
Climate data for Pili, Camarines Sur
Month	Jan	Feb	Mar	Apr	May	Jun	Jul	Aug	Sep	Oct	Nov	Dec	Year
Mean daily maximum °C (°F)	33 (91)	32 (90)	35 (95)	37 (99)	38 (100)	36 (97)	35 (95)	33 (91)	35 (95)	34 (93)	33 (91)	32 (90)	34 (94)
Mean daily minimum °C (°F)	27 (81)	27 (81)	29 (84)	31 (88)	32 (90)	32 (90)	31 (88)	29 (84)	30 (86)	29 (84)	28 (82)	28 (82)	29 (85)
Average precipitation mm (inches)	36.66 (1.44)	58.6 (2.31)	37.91 (1.49)	76.31 (3.00)	98.34 (3.87)	151.99 (5.98)	288.39 (11.35)	291.41 (11.47)	186.77 (7.35)	363.21 (14.30)	97.5 (3.84)	292.1 (11.50)	1,979.19 (77.9)
Average rainy days	18	23	16	17	25	28	31	26	27	29	24	29	293
Source: World Weather Online

== Demographics ==
Population census of Pili
Year	Pop.	±% p.a.
1903	2,213	—
1918	6,342	+7.27%
1939	18,225	+5.16%
1948	25,300	+3.71%
1960	22,934	−0.81%
1970	29,521	+2.55%
1975	36,676	+4.45%
1980	43,181	+3.32%
1990	52,481	+1.97%
1995	61,520	+3.02%
2000	67,393	+1.97%
2007	76,496	+1.76%
2010	82,307	+2.70%
2015	89,545	+1.62%
2020	99,196	+2.18%
2024	101,668	+0.59%
Source: Philippine Statistics Authority

In the 2024 census, the population of Pili was 101,668 people, with a density of 810 inhabitants per square kilometre or 2,100 inhabitants per square mile.

=== Languages ===
There are two dialects of the Bikolano language which is used all over the municipality. The Naga variant of Central Bikolano on the northern part, and Riŋkonāda or Rinconada Bikol on the south. However, the Naga variant of Central Bikolano is the lingua franca which is used all throughout for communication. Tagalog and English language are also widely understood.

=== Religion ===
Roman Catholicism is the predominant religion in the municipality, where the town is under the jurisdiction of the Archdiocese of Caceres in Naga City. Known churches in the town includes St. Raphael the Archangel Parish in Poblacion district and Our Lady of Remedies Parish Church in the uptown Barangay Curry. It is followed by Born-Again Christian denominations, Iglesia ni Cristo, Jehovah's Witnesses, etc.

=== Culture ===
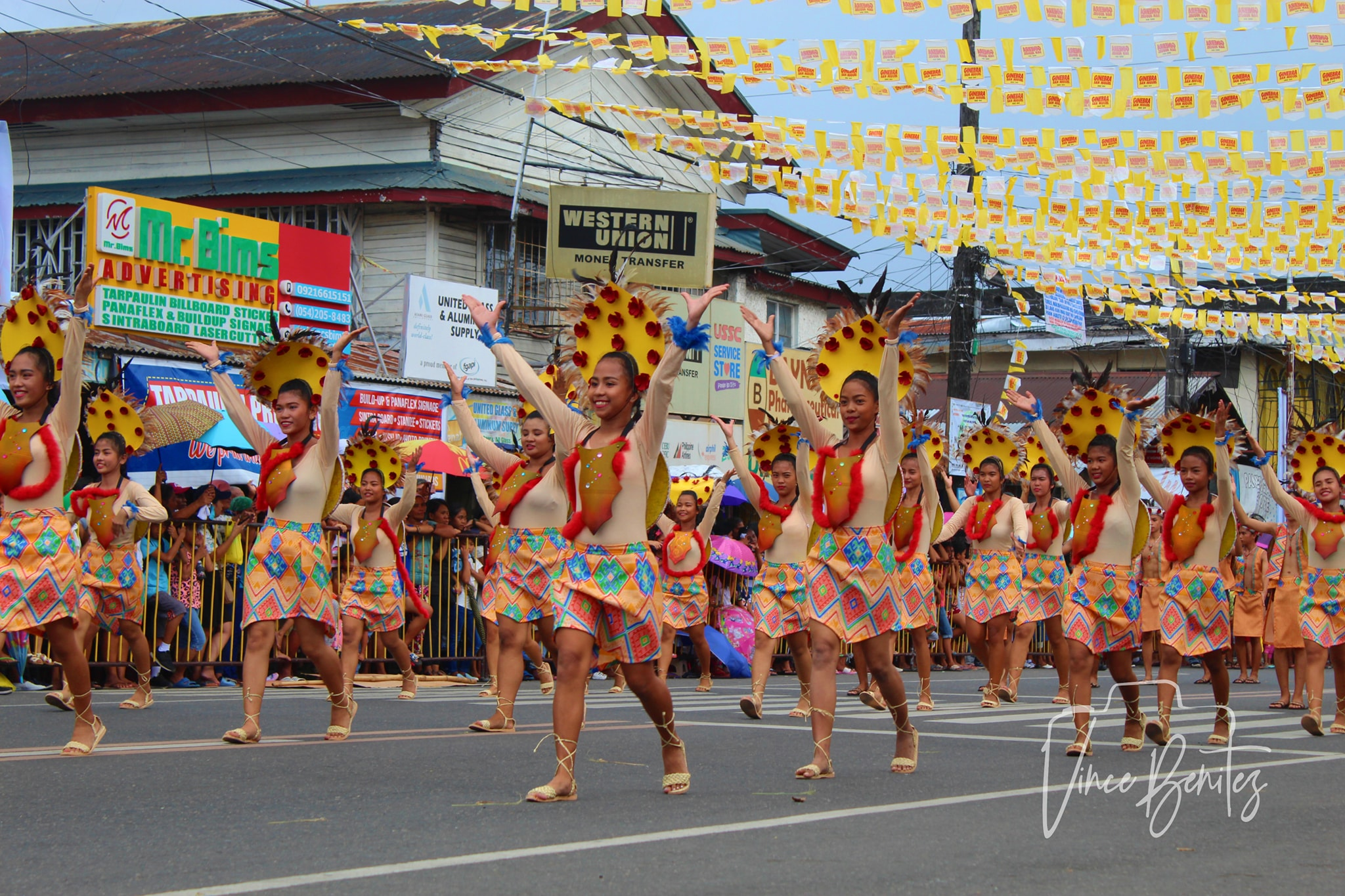
Street dancing competition of the Cimarrones Festival

Aside from the feast of every barangay and sitios, there are two major festivals being celebrated in the town. The municipal government hosts the religious-based town fiesta in the Centro district, while the provincial government has its own festival for its foundation.

The Pili Town Fiesta is for the celebration of the feast of St. Raphael the Archangel, the patron saint of Pili. It is celebrated annually every October 23–24 since the foundation of the parish in 1819. The Cimarrones Festival is an annual cultural festival held on the whole month of October in Pili, which is celebrated by the six barangays of the Pili Centro District. The festival has three popular major events in the capital town: Street Dancing Competition, Musical Night, and Miss Capital Town. Through Presidential Proclamation 685, October 24, 2024 was declared a special non-working day to commemorate the Cimarrones Festival.

== Economy ==
Poverty incidence of Pili (%)

Source: Philippine Statistics Authority

Pili is an agriculture-based economy supported by a thriving government sector and a budding tourism sector. Its primary economic activities revolve around agriculture. Pili nuts, coconut, rice, corn and vegetables are major income sources for its residents. The town with its giant warehouses and milling plants was designated Bicolandia's Agro-Industrial Center.

As the capital town of Camarines Sur, Pili hosts a number of provincial offices, the most notable of which is the Provincial Capitol. The barangays of Cadlan and San Jose, located at the northern part of the town, host most of these agencies. In addition, Camarines Sur Freedom Sports Complex in San Jose hosts provincial and regional sports events. The Camsur Watersports Complex, opened in 2006, has become a popular destination for watersport enthusiasts.

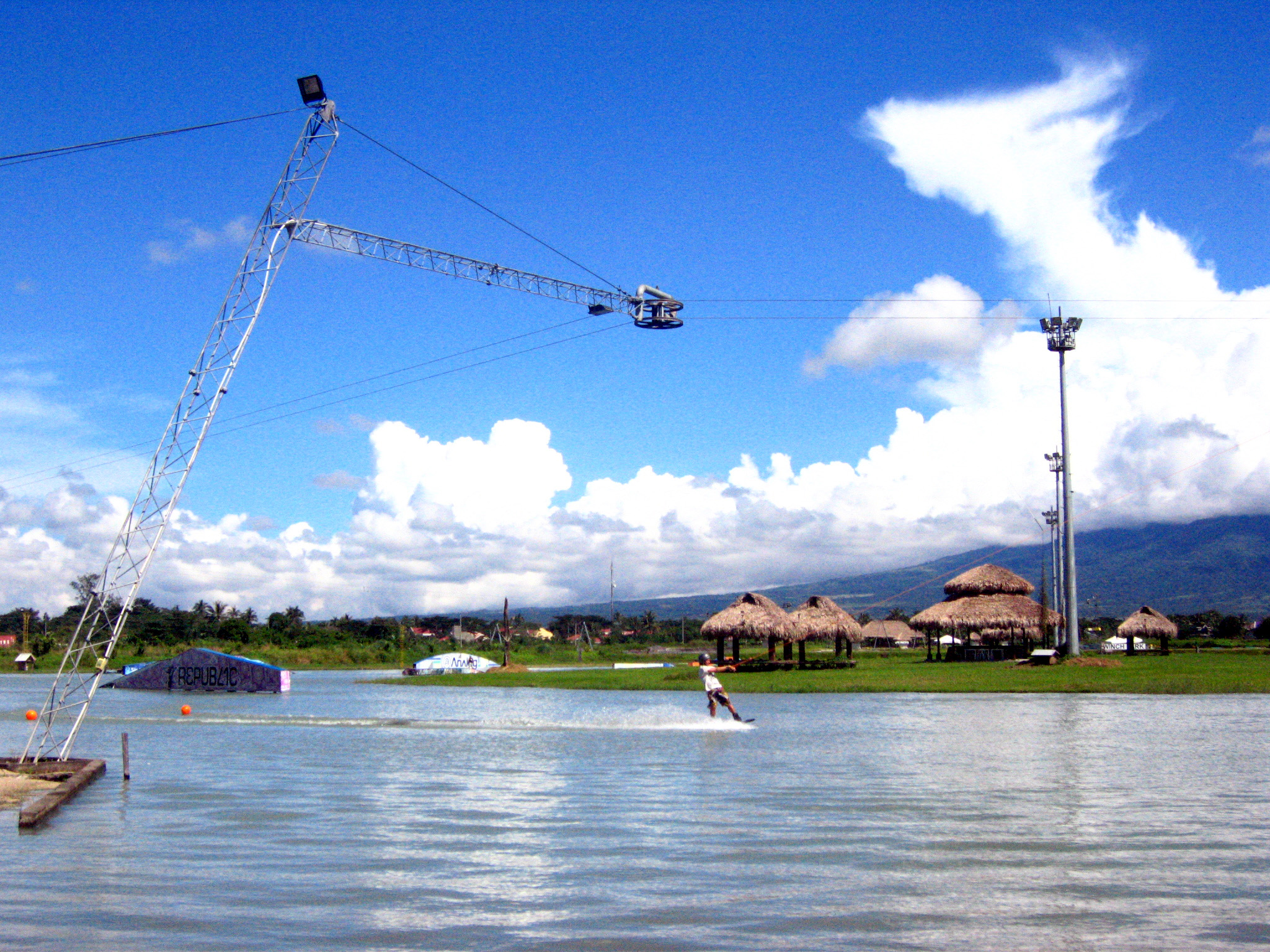
Camarines Sur Watersports Complex (CWC), in the provincial capitol complex in Cadlan, is the top tourist destination in the town.

Due to the increase of economic activities in the town, Pili is now classified as a 1st class municipality in terms of income classification. Attaining a steady progress through time, the capital town is now preparing to be the next chartered city in the province of Camarines Sur. This is through the Executive Order No. 24, Series of 2020 on June 1, 2020, which created the "Pili Cityhood Committee" headed by Mayor Tom P. Bongalonta Jr. The committee is tasked to evaluate, study, prepare, and propose the necessary requirements of the law to convert Pili into a component city.

The municipality is the third largest commercial center in Camarines Sur (after Naga and Iriga) and the 10th largest commercial center in the Bicol Region. The commercial and business center is the town proper, which the locals called "Pili Centro", and is the densest part of the town. The "Daang Maharlika" or the national road is the main road of the town proper, where it stretches from San Isidro to Santiago. Markets in the district includes the Pili Public Market, SM Savemore Market, and the LCC Supermarket. Multiple department stores also made their way to the town.

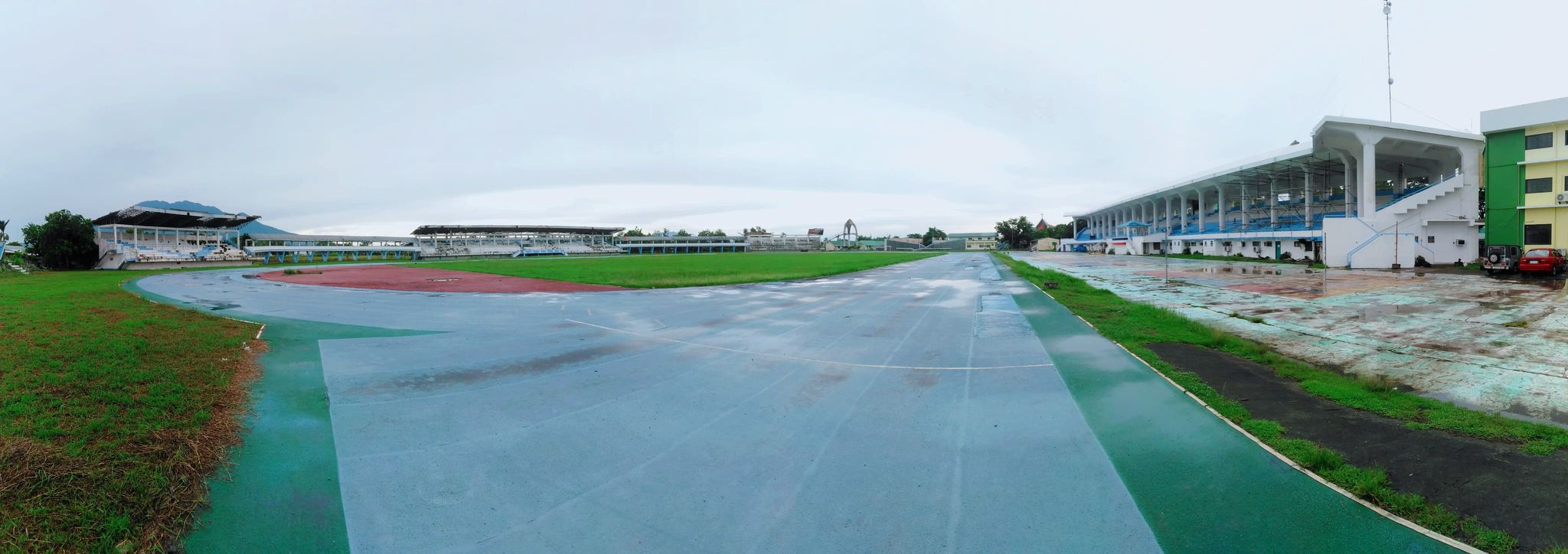
Panoramic view of Camarines Sur Freedom Sports Complex

=== Agricultural and agro-industrial developments ===
The town of Pili has a plain and elevated geography, making it very ideal for agriculture. Majority of the farmlands are in the area between the Uptown and Downtown Area. Rice, sugarcanes, and corn are the primary products.

Pili is also the regional center of agricultural administration in the Bicol Region. In barangay San Agustin, the Department of Agriculture - Regional Office, the Central Bicol Experiment Station, and the Agricultural Training Institute are located.

- Old agro-industrial zone

The old agro-industrial zone of the town is concentrated at the southwest portion of the town, and stretches along the Pili Diversion Road and south of the poblacion district (New San Roque, Anayan, etc.).

The Co Say and Company Inc. was the pioneer in the agro-industrial development of the town. It has an Oil Milling Plant which produces crude coconut oil at La Purisima near the Pili Diversion Road, and its former Rice Milling Plant at Tagbong. Now, the area also hosts the Partido Rice Mill, Bicol Biomass Energy Corporation (the first rice husk-fired power plant in Southern Luzon), B-Meg Plant - Southern Luzon Feedmill Inc. (SLFI), Penafrancia Sugar Mill (Pensumil), and giant warehouses of WL Foods Corporation, etc.

- Santa Rita Industrial Park

The Santa Rita Industrial Park, developed by the Santa Rita Ecozone Corporation, is located in Barangay San Jose and Sagurong. It has a land area of 219 hectares. Notable landmarks in the economic zone includes the Bicol JL Agri Corporation and the Pili Water District.

- Isarog Heights Special Economic Zone

It is a planned new economic zone in the town. It will be developed by the Manubay Agro-Industrial and Development Corporation with an estimated project cost of 799.26 million pesos. It has a land area of 124.3 hectares in the barangay of Cadlan, which has preferred industries in food processing and manufacturing.

=== Housing developments ===
As Naga’s urban development extended beyond its administrative borders, Pili experienced rapid urbanization. New housing developments have sprouted along the areas closer to Naga, ranging from middle to high-class ones especially. Barangay Palestina is ideal for housing developments as it is the nearest barangay to the city. Housing developments in Palestina includes the Amaia Scapes, Lumina Homes, St. Paul Subdivision, Pamon Village, etc. In the barangay of Cadlan, there is the Camella Homes and Lessandra Pili.

=== Eco-tourism ===
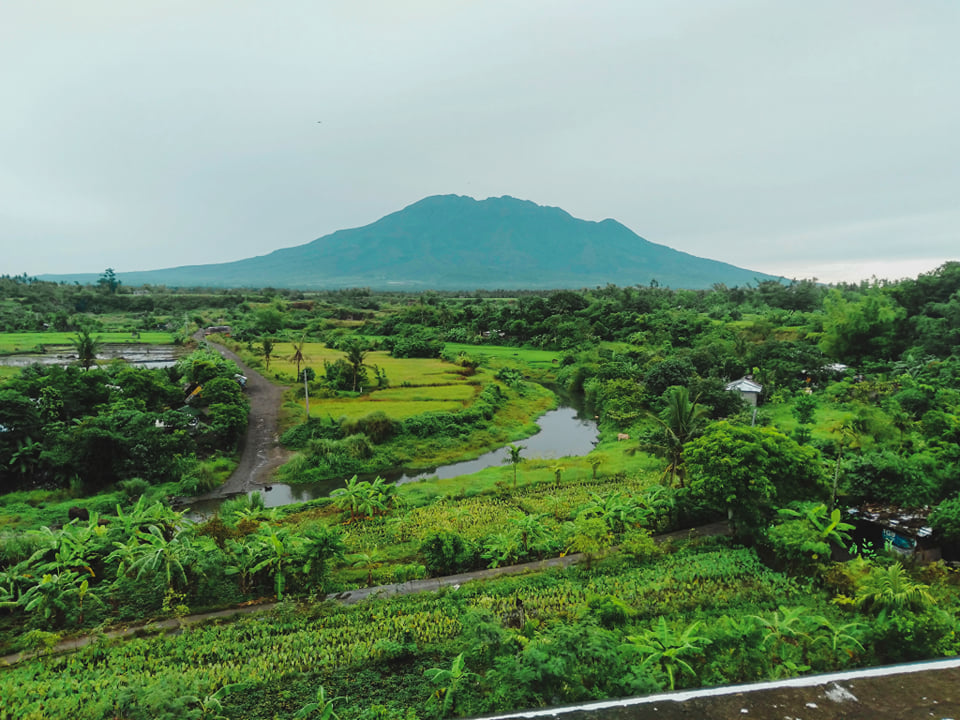
View of Mt. Isarog from the lowlands

At the foot of the mountain, the highland area of Mt. Isarog includes the barangays of Tinangis, Curry, and Santo Nino. Landmarks in this area includes the Filipino-Japanese Friendship Monument declared as a National Historical Landmark in Sitio Boncao, Barangay Curry, White Cross at the entrance of Tinangis, and the Jose Velarde Race Track (Curry). The Mt. Isarog National Park is not only known for its biodiversity and beauty; it is also famous for its clean and cold flowing water. The natural waterfall in Pili includes Tinagrawan Falls at Tinangis and the “Eight Waterfalls in One River of Sitio Boncao, Curry” which includes the Slide Falls and the Balang (Shower) Falls.

One natural waterfall which is visible from the downtown especially during rainy weather is the Maati Falls. It came from the Bicol word "ati" or "loses a certain amount for a fluid", because the falls was perceived to vanish during a sunny weather and appear again during a rainy weather. However, it was believed that reaching the Maati Falls is very difficult.

Mt. Isarog serves as the source of drinking water throughout the town of Pili via the Pili Water District.

== Government ==
Pili Municipal Hall

Like other municipalities in the Philippines, the town is governed by a municipal mayor and vice mayor who are elected to three-year terms. The mayor is the executive head and leads the municipal departments in executing the municipal ordinances and improving public services. The municipal mayor is restricted to three consecutive terms, totaling nine years, although a mayor can be elected again after an interruption of one term. The vice mayor heads a legislative council consisting of 10 members: 8 councilors, the president of the Sangguniang Kabataan (Youth Council) Federation, representing the youth sector, and the president of the Association of Barangay Chairmen (ABC) as barangay sectoral representative. The council is in charge of creating policies of the LGU in the form of Ordinances and Resolutions.

=== Municipal officials ===
The First Female Mayor in the history of Pili is Hon. Marivic Breboneria Solano."

Local Government Unit of Pili
	Nelson Legacion. (LP)	
Mayor
	Marivic Breboneria Solano (NUP)	
Vice Mayor
	Tomas Pacis Bongalonta Jr.(NPC)	
Sangguniang Bayan Members
	Nicheta Nardo Malate (NUP)	Maria Lourdes Divinagracia Baltazar (NUP)
	Benito Dychinco Regondola (NUP)	Ronald Prila Boclot (LAKAS)
	Maria Roxan Rosanes Nayles (NUP)	Maria Mercidita Chozas Violeta (LAKAS)
	Romeo Sanchez Salazar (LAKAS)	Narcel San Juan Lopez (PFP)
ABC President
Arturo Bismonte
SK Federation President
Manuel Leam Yao B. Tormes

== Infrastructure ==
=== Health ===
The Bicol Medical Center - Department of Psychiatry is located in Cadlan. Formerly a standalone mental hospital called Don Susano J. Rodriguez Memorial Mental Hospital (DSJRMMH), it was integrated to the Bicol Medical Center in 1984. It is a 200-bed capacity psychiatric ward situated in a leafy 32-hectare medical campus, 8 kilometers away from the medical center's main location in Naga City.

=== Transportation ===
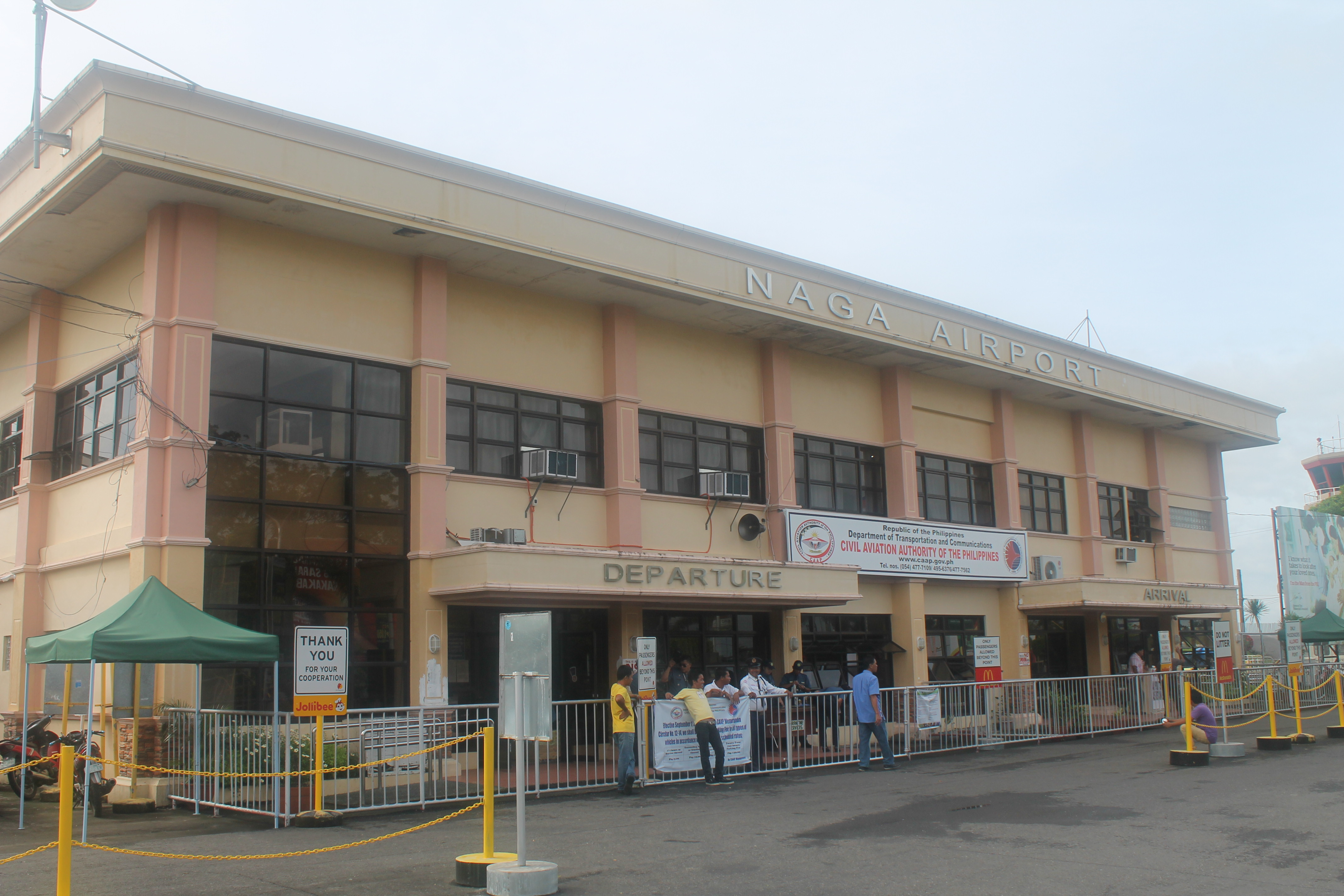
Naga Airport

Pili is the site of Naga Airport. It serves the City of Naga and the rest of Metro Naga (which includes the capital town of Pili, Camarines Sur). It is located inside the main campus of Central Bicol State University of Agriculture at the barangay of San Jose.

The town is not coastal and thus depends mainly on land transportation. Major local transportation is either on jeepneys or buses. Some barangays also use motorcycles (habal-habal). The Philippine National Railways have a night train service from Manila called Mayon Limited. It arrives at Pili railway station at 5:58/5:59 am local time.

=== Utilities ===
Water supplied by the established water system under the Pili Water District (PIWAD), which has a water source from Mt. Isarog. Electricity is supplied by the Camarines Sur Electric Cooperative II (CASURECO II).

== Education ==
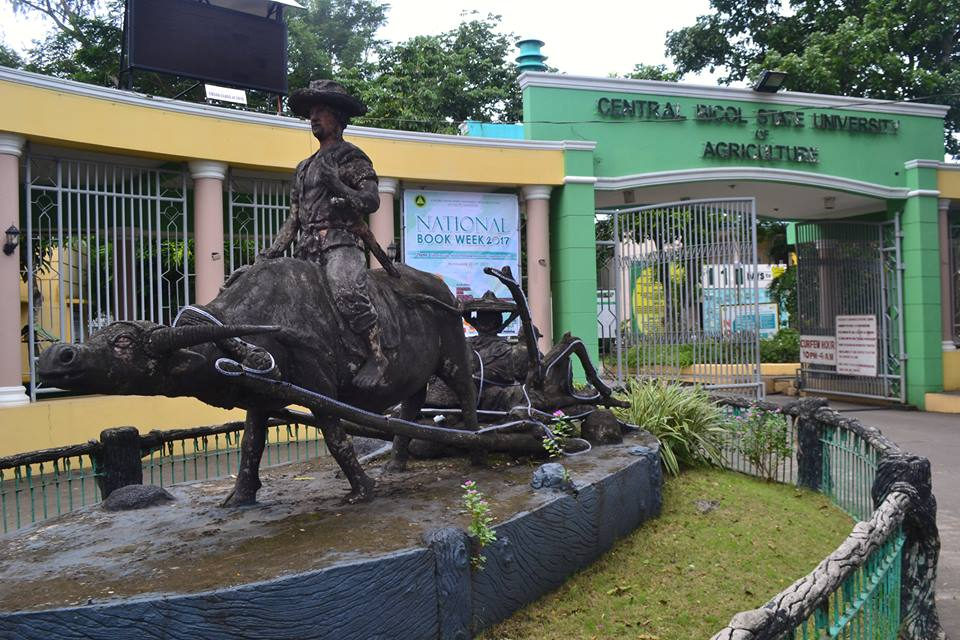
Central Bicol State University of Agriculture - Main Campus

The Pili Schools District Office governs all educational institutions within the municipality. It oversees the management and operations of all private and public, from primary to secondary schools.

There are two major “school belts” in the town: the San Jose (in the North) and the Pili Centro (in the South). The barangay of San Jose, which is considered as the provincial education hub, has the highest density in terms of number of learning institutions among the barangays in the town which is comparable to the whole of Centro district.

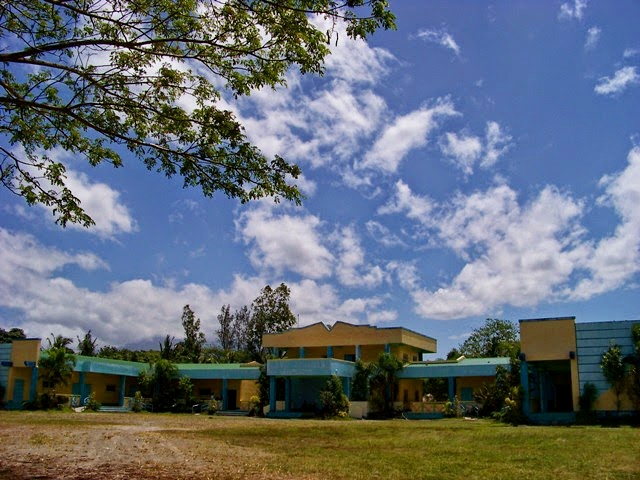
Computer Science High School of Bicolandia

The “San Jose Belt” stretches along the Maharlika Highway from San Jose North Elementary School (Camarines Sur Freedom Sports Complex) to San Jose South Elementary School, while the “Pili Centro Belt” stretches along the Maharlika Highway from the Universidad de Santa Isabel – Pili Campus up to Pili National High School.

The Central Bicol State University of Agriculture (CBSUA), a state university, has its main campus located in the town specifically in San Jose. Its other campuses can be found in the towns of Pasacao, Sipocot, and Calabanga, which are all in the province of Camarines Sur. The university also houses the Computer Science High School of Bicolandia in its main campus which is now DepEd-administered.

The CBSUA is now SUC level IV and ISO 9001:2015 accredited. It celebrated its centennial year in 2018. The university continues to be a Center of Development first in Agricultural and then Education and Teaching Education in the country and is known as one of the National University/College of Agriculture (NUCA) in the Philippines.

=== Primary and elementary schools ===
- A. Manaog Elementary School
- A.D.J. Garbiles Sr. Elementary School
- Agaton C. Rodriguez Elementary School
- Anayan Sagrada Elementary School
- Bagong Sirang Elementary School
- Binanuaanan Norte Elementary School
- Binanuaanan Sur Elementary School
- Binobong Elementary School
- Blessed Name of Mary Learning School
- Bliss Elementary School
- Cabocladan Elementary School
- Camarines Sur Sports Academy
- Caroyroyan Elementary School
- Colegio de San Rafael Arcangel
- Curry Elementary School
- Del Rosario Elem School
- Evangelical Christian School
- Himaao Elementary School
- Jose B. Velarde Elementary School
- La Purisima Elementary School
- Little Therese Parochial School
- Mama Mary Learning Center
- Montessori Children's House of Learning
- Pag-asa Elementary School
- Palestina Elementary School
- Pawili Elementary School
- Pensumil Elementary School
- Pili Central School
- Pili West Central School
- Queen Royal Montessori
- R. Malanyaon Elementary School
- San Agustin Elementary School
- San Jose North Elementary School
- San Jose South Elementary School
- School of The Future
- Soledad Marasigan Elementary School
- Sto. Nino Elementary School
- Tagbong Elementary School
- Tinangis Elementary School
- Unibersidad de Sta. Isabel Pili
- Upper Lampog Elementary School
- Yobhel Christian Academy

=== Secondary schools ===
- Altamarino-Clasio High School
- Bikol High School for the Arts & Culture
- Binauaanan High School
- Binobong High School
- Camarines Science Oriented High School
- Camarines Sur Sports Academy
- Computer Science High School of Bicolandia
- Doña Basilia S. Quilon Memorial High School
- Gov. Mariano E. Villafuerte High School
- Pili National High School
- Rodriguez National High School
- Sagurong High School
- San Jose Pili National High School
- V. Bagasina Sr. Memorial High School

=== Higher educational institutions ===
- Central Bicol State University of Agriculture
- Pili Capital College Inc.
