= Philippine–Japanese Friendship Tower =

Friendship Tower
- 14°36′20″N 120°23′51″E
- Location: Bagac, Bataan, Philippines
- Height: 27 m (89 ft)
- Completion date: 1975
- Dedicated to: Post-World War II Japan–Philippines relations

The Philippine–Japanese Friendship Tower is a monument in Bagac, Bataan, Philippines.

== History ==
The site of the Friendship Tower in Bagac, Bataan is located about 200 meters (660 ft) from where the Bataan Death March of April 1942 took place which caused the deaths of 10,000 war prisoners. After World War II, Japan started rebuilding its relations with the Philippines which also saw Japanese nationals doing civic programs in Bataan in cooperation with the local government despite anti-Japanese sentiment in Bataan due to the war.

Risshō Kōsei Kai (RKK), a Japanese Buddhist religious group and locals who later established the Bataan Christian Youth Civic Circle were responsible for raising the monument. The monument was inaugurated on April 8, 1975 and is meant to commemorate the cordial Post-World War II Japan–Philippines relations. On the following day, a bell which was imported from Japan was ceremonially rang by then Bagac Mayor Atilano Ricardo and RKK youth head Rev. Kinjiro Niwano.

== Monument ==
The Friendship Tower is a structure which consists of three pillars joined by rings. It has a height of 27 meters (89 ft). The structure also hosts a hanged peace.
