= San Jose, Camarines Sur =

Municipality in Camarines Sur, Philippines

San Jose Danlog
- Municipality
- Municipality of San Jose
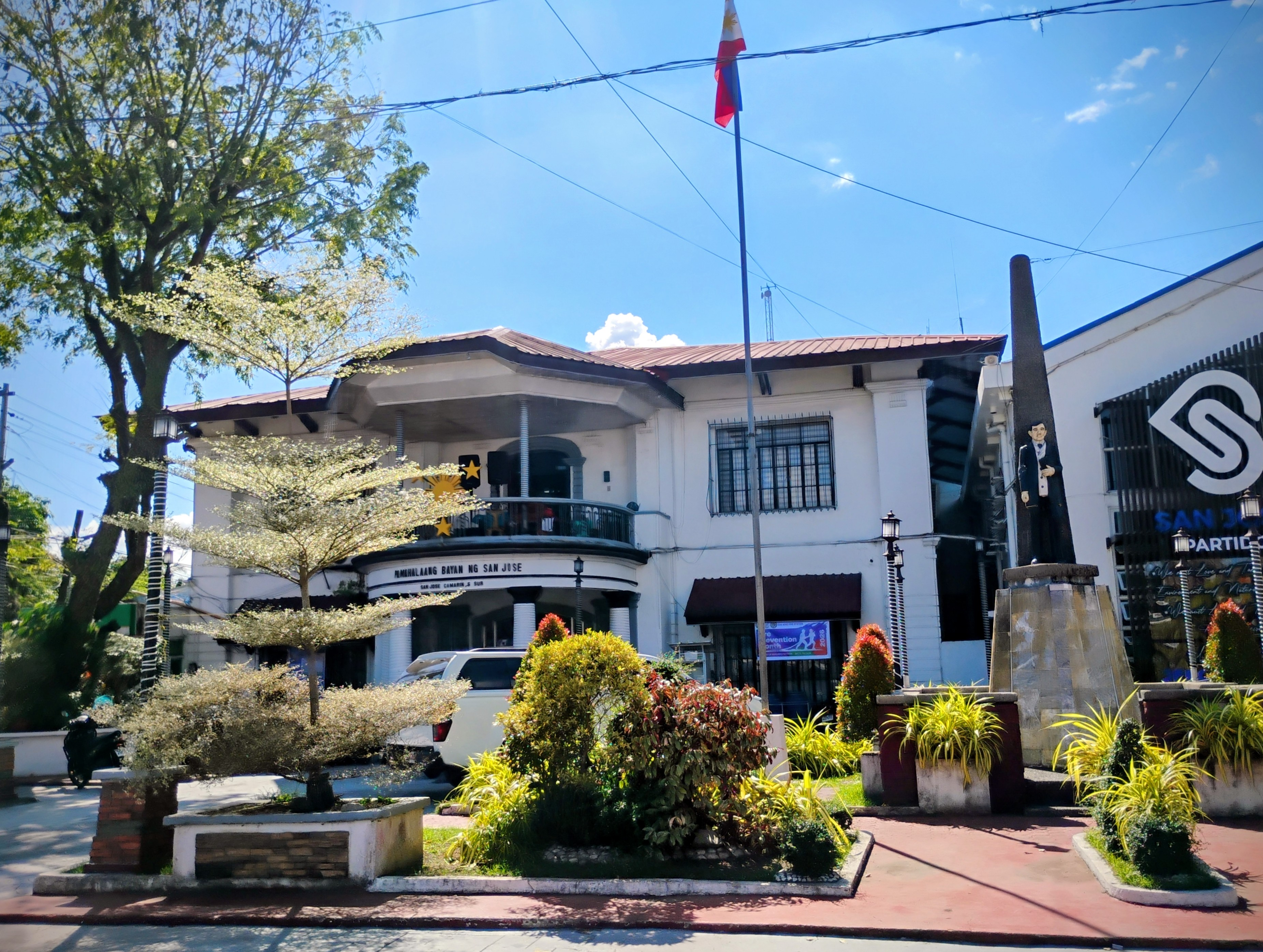
- San Jose Municipal Hall

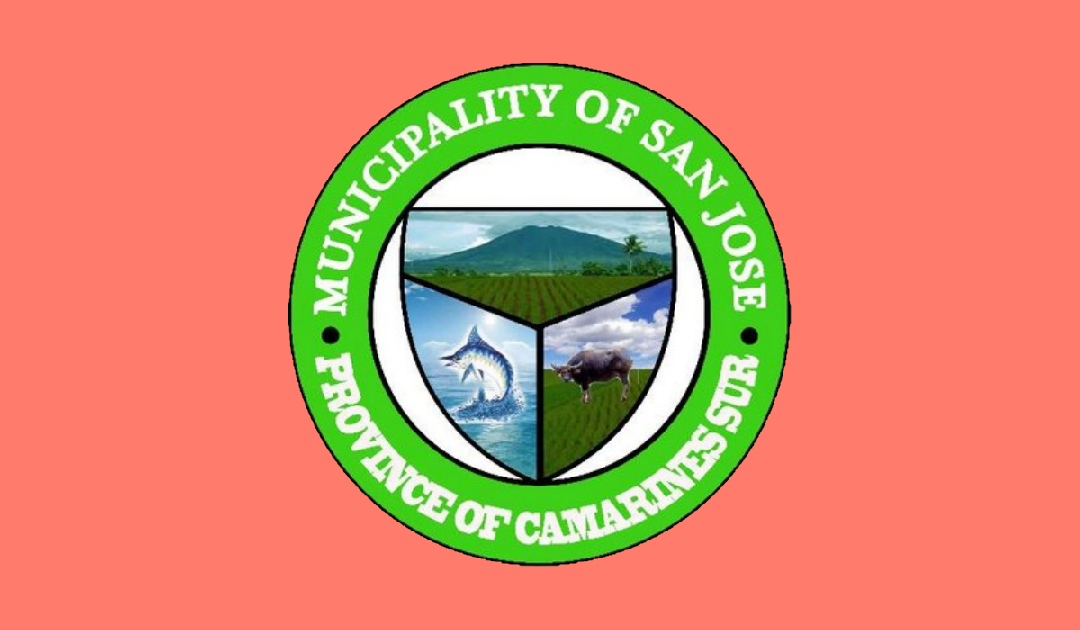
- Flag Seal
- Motto: Sa matanos na Gobyerno, An tawo maasenso. (In a righteous government, the people will prosper.)
- Map of Camarines Sur with San Jose highlighted
- Interactive map of San Jose
- Location within the Philippines
- Coordinates: 13°41′53″N 123°31′07″E
- Country: Philippines
- Region: Bicol Region
- Province: Camarines Sur
- District: 4th district
- Founded: May 19, 1813
- Barangays: 29 (see Barangays)

Government
  - Type: Sangguniang Bayan
  - Mayor: Jerold B. Peña
  - Vice Mayor: Virgilio E. Panuelos
  - Representative: Arnulf Bryan B. Fuentebella
  - Municipal Council: Members: Marsan B. Durante; Manuel P. Chavez; Vincent Bruce L. Burce; Audie P. Concina; Bobby H. Clutario; Charlie Francis O. Villarreal; Domingo A. Tam Jr.; Marciano B. Chavez Jr.
  - Electorate: 31,835 voters (2025)

Area
  - Total: 43.07 km^{2} (16.63 sq mi)
- Elevation: 36 m (118 ft)
- Highest elevation: 193 m (633 ft)
- Lowest elevation: 0 m (0 ft)

Population (2024 census)
  - Total: 44,688
  - Density: 1,038/km^{2} (2,687/sq mi)
  - Households: 10,144

Economy
  - Income class: 3rd municipal income class
  - Poverty incidence: 27.5% (2023)
  - Revenue: ₱ 169.5 million (2024)
  - Assets: ₱ 416.3 million (2024)
  - Expenditure: ₱ 156.9 million (2024)
  - Liabilities: ₱ 58.13 million (2024)

Service provider
  - Electricity: Camarines Sur 4 Electric Cooperative (CASURECO 4)
- Time zone: UTC+8 (PST)
- ZIP code: 4423
- PSGC: 0501733000
- IDD : area code: +63 (0)54
- Native languages: Central Bikol; Tagalog
- Website: Official Website

San Jose, officially the Municipality of San Jose (Central Bikol: Banwaan kan San Jose; Tagalog: Bayan ng San Jose), is a municipality in the province of Camarines Sur, Philippines. According to the 2024 census, it has a population of 44,688 people.

== Geography ==
San Jose has a total land area of 4,702.8146 hectares and is bounded in north by Lagonoy, south by Tigaon, east by Lagonoy Gulf, and west by Goa. The whole town is roughly 0.27% of the region's 1.76 million hectares; 0.89% of the total land area of Camarines Sur with an area of 526.680 square kilometers; and 2.26% of the total land area of the 4th Congressional District of Camarines Sur with an area of 207,596.71 hectares.

Formerly known as Patrocinio, it is located at the southern part of the province. It is a distance of about 55 kilometres (34 mi) from Naga City and 45 kilometres (28 mi) away from the town of Pili, the capital town of the province.

=== Barangays ===
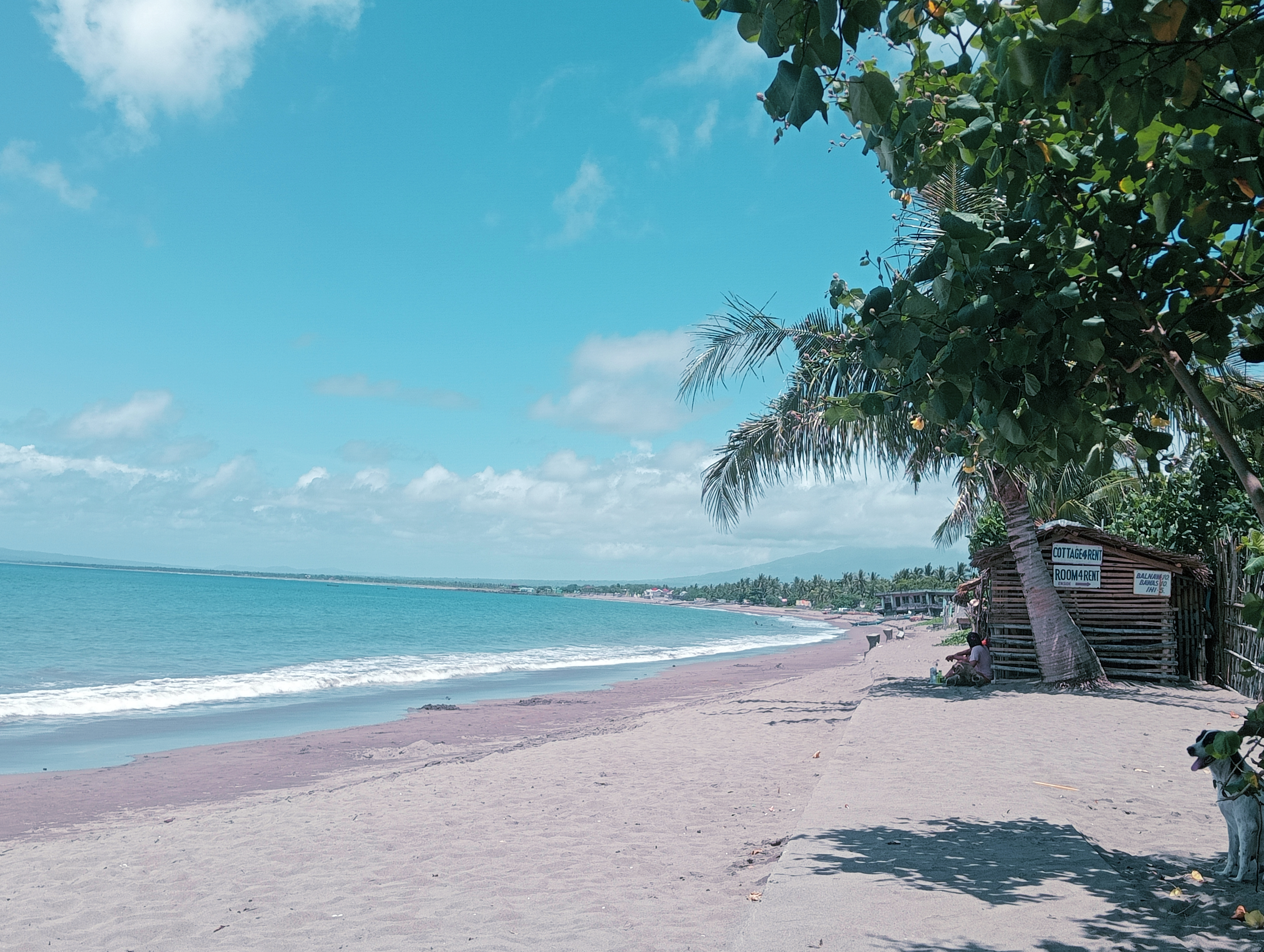
Barangay Sabang

San Jose is politically subdivided into 29 barangays. Each barangay consists of puroks and some have sitios.

- Adiangao
- Bagacay
- Bahay
- Boclod
- Calalahan
- Calawit
- Camagong
- Catalotoan
- Danlog
- Del Carmen (Poblacion)
- Dolo
- Kinalansan
- Mampirao
- Manzana
- Minoro
- Palale
- Ponglon
- Pugay
- Sabang
- Salogon
- San Antonio (Poblacion)
- San Juan (Poblacion)
- San Vicente (Poblacion)
- Santa Cruz (Poblacion)
- Soledad (Poblacion)
- Tagas
- Tambangan
- Telegrafo
- Tominawog

=== Climate ===
Climate data for San Jose, Camarines Sur
Month	Jan	Feb	Mar	Apr	May	Jun	Jul	Aug	Sep	Oct	Nov	Dec	Year
Mean daily maximum °C (°F)	29 (84)	29 (84)	30 (86)	31 (88)	32 (90)	32 (90)	31 (88)	32 (90)	31 (88)	31 (88)	30 (86)	29 (84)	31 (87)
Mean daily minimum °C (°F)	23 (73)	23 (73)	23 (73)	24 (75)	25 (77)	25 (77)	25 (77)	25 (77)	24 (75)	24 (75)	24 (75)	23 (73)	24 (75)
Average precipitation mm (inches)	189.5 (7.46)	169.4 (6.67)	133.1 (5.24)	119.4 (4.70)	134.2 (5.28)	221.2 (8.71)	200.5 (7.89)	155 (6.1)	189 (7.4)	314.6 (12.39)	369.2 (14.54)	444 (17.5)	2,639.1 (103.88)
Average rainy days	18	14	14	13	13	15	17	14	16	22	23	24	203
Source: World Weather Online

The municipality belongs to Type II Climate characterized by the absence of a dry season and very pronounced maximum rainfall from November to December. It is during these months that the Northeast monsoon season occurs and the tropical cyclones contribute to the increased rainfall in the area. In January and February, the effect of these air masses on rainfall is considerably radical. In addition to the north-east monsoon during the months of February and March, the trail winds traveling from East to West do not give significant increase of rainfall. Likely, the month of May is the transition period between the monsoon that is prevalent from June to September. During the south-west monsoon season, the linear system called the Intertropical Convergence Zone (ITZ), brings the largest amount of rainfall to the area. In October, which is the transitive period between the south-west and north-east monsoons, the tropical cyclone brings considerable amount of rain.

The rainfall distribution in the municipality is greatly influenced by the air streams, tropical cyclones, the Intertropical Convergence Zone, shorelines, easterly waves and other rainfall-causing weather patterns. The rainfall season occurs from June to December with high rainfall intensity of 285.06mm to 474.22m and less rainfall intensity of 245.30mm to 224.06m from January to the month May which at the same time is the onset of effective rainfall with 75% probability and it would terminate in February of the following year which consequently during this period the mountainous areas receive higher intensity of rainfall. But the trend of monthly rainfall is unimodal (having one peak) and the maximum rain period is from October to December. On the other hand, the monthly average rainfall varies from 125.86mm to 594.56mm with a mean annual rainfall of 298.54mm.

The winds are influenced by the monsoon and the Pacific Trade System with Northeast direction that occurs in November to February; Easterly winds during the months of March, April, May and October; Southwest winds in June to August; and Westerly winds in September.

The maximum temperature during the month of January reaches about 27.9°C while 31.8 °C in November. The minimum temperature from December to June reaches about 20.6 °C to 24.5 °C; and the average monthly temperature is recorded at 25.0 °C in January to 27.9 °C in June.

Relative humidity is indicative of the amount of water vapor present in the atmosphere. Humidity in the Philippines as in the municipality of San Jose is high because of the warm moist air streams flowing over the archipelago, the surrounding seas, rich vegetation and abundant rainfall. The lowest average relative humidity occurs in May with 85.9%; highest in February with 93.4%; and the annual average humidity is 90% which is higher than the regional and national average of 82%.

==== Typhoon and storm surges ====
The tropical cyclone is a climatic control that contributes largely to the rainfall from June to December. It was shown to usually cause maximum values of rainfall and winds as exemplified by the highest wind speed of 77 miles per second as recorded in Virac, Catanduanes areas during the height of Typhoon Sening in 1970.

The tropical cyclones are internationally classified with these depending on their maximum wind speed or peak wind velocities (V) as follows:

- Tropical Depression, V<33 knots (63 km/h)
- Tropical Storm, 33 knots < V < 47 k (87 km/h)
- Tropical Storm, 47 knots < u < 63 knots (116 km/h)
- Typhoon, u > 63 knots (116 km/h)

The cyclones affecting the Philippine islands originate from the Pacific Ocean East of the Islands between latitude 8 degrees North, 10 degrees South, traveling on a Westerly or Northwesterly course over the country. It has the highest sustained wind velocity of 6 knots in November to April and lowest sustained wind velocity of 4 knots in September. Note that the average cyclone that passes over mainland Bicol which include San Jose town is 3 cyclones for every 2 years.

=== Topography ===
The terrain of the municipality is characterized as level to gently rolling and sloping. About 91.96% is characterized as having a generally flat terrain with a slope 0-3% which is described to be level to nearly level. It practically covers the entire land area of the town except barangay Adiangao which is located along the mountain range of Caramoan Peninsula which has an undulating to rolling terrain with 8.04% portions of steep slopes.

The elevation of the municipality is roughly 92.55% low to very low with a mean elevation from 0–100 meters above sea level. Hence, low elevation is about 5.72% ranging from 100 to 300 meters above sea level as well as 1.73% with moderately high elevation ranging from 300 to 500 meters above sea level.

=== Geology ===
The major part of the municipal area is composed of Alluvium River Terraces which is particularly described as fluvicatile lacustrine alluvium composed of unsorted loosely consolidated pebbles, gravel, silt, coral debris and clay that can be found in flooded plains, riverbanks, sand bars, beaches, and tidal flats. It is notable that river terraces along the Lagonoy River and its tributaries which include also the Rangas River that practically originating from the foot of the Mount Isarog account for about 90.69% or 4,264.9826 hectares of the total land area of the municipality while the rest is of igneous and metamorphic rock origin of which volcanoclast alluvial fans cover about 0.19% or 8.94 hectares. These are specifically found in barangays Catalotoan and Salogon. Note that volcanoclast is a thick and extensive pyroclastic material consists of ashes, cinder lapili, tuff agromerate and volcanic debris while alluvial fans consists only of worked pyroclastics.

Geological Table
Mapping Symbol	Descriptions	Area (in Has.)	% to Total
Sedimentary Rocks:			
R - Recent Alluvial, River Terraces	Fluvicatile Lacustrine alluvium (unsorted loosely consolidated pebbles, gravel, silt, coral debris and clay) in flood plains, riverbank, bars, beaches, and tidal flats. River terraces along Lagonoy River and its tributaries.	4,264.9826	90.69
QVP - Volcanoclast Alluvial Fans	Thick and extensive pyroclastic (asshes, cinders, lapilli, tuff agglomerate and volcanic debris) at the foot of Mt. Iriga and residual slope of Mt. Labo. Alluvial fans mainly consisting of work pyroclastic.	8.9353	0.19
BC - Basement Complex	Highly fractured and folded complex consisting of quartzite, quartzatedspathit and mica schists.	247.3680	5.26
N_{2}LS - Crystalline Limestone	Extensive transgressive reetal carbonated facies incl. wall preserved bushes of corals, megafossils and algae structure. Detrital to tuffacious limestone showing well-developed karst landforms especially karst formation in Caramoan Peninsula.	181.5286	3.86
	Total	4,702.8146	100.00

Source: Municipal Comprehensive Landuse Plan & Zoning Ordinance (2000-2010)

On the other hand, barangay Adiangao is composed of igneous and metamorphic rocks classified as Basement Complex. It is characterized as highly fractured and folded complex consisting of quartzite, quartzatedspathit and mica schists that cover roughly 5.26% or 247.37 hectares. Meanwhile, the lower part of the place is composed of sedimentary rocks known as crystalline limestone which covers about 3.86% or 181.53 hectares. Crystalline limestone is an extensive transgressive rectal carbonated facies including wall preserved bushes of corals, megafossils and algae structure, detritae to fuffacious limestone showing well developed karst landforms or formation that can be found prevalent in the Caramoan Peninsula.

=== Landforms ===
The many landforms found in the municipality have been the natural production of the different geographical pressures of the different structural land forms such as alluvial lowland, alluvial fans, sedimentary plateau or masses of residual slopes and thick sedimentary landscapes. Most of its territorial areas are best characterized by broad alluvial plans described as level to nearly level, and moderately well-drained terraces. The level to undulating plains are the product of paludal environment or deltaic plains which are usually being flooded during slight and heavy downpours.

On the other hand, Barangay Adiangao is characterized by Shale/Sandstone Hills (SSH) which is described to be undulating to rolling, slightly to moderately dissected, and moistly top-rounded hills, both are low and high relief. Likewise, steep slopes are dissected closely with each other particularly those with greater than 18^{o} inclinations. Meanwhile, V-shaped valleys are noted to have been composed and dominated by sandstone. Likewise, landforms in barangays Dolo, Sabang, part of Minoro, Manzana and Tagas are noted to be flat with very poorly drained terrains and oftentimes affected by floods caused by high tides. The coastal plains are most commonly swarmed with mangroves, nipa plants, break rides, swales and tidal flats.

==== Major Types of Land Management Units ====
The municipality is composed of 5 major types of Land Management Units (LMUs) which are classified into 2 forms, namely: Warm Lowland and Warm Cool Hillyland. They are enumerated and explained below.

Warm Lowland:

- Tidal Flats (LMU 02) is very deep, fine loamy dark grayish brown but sometimes coarse loamy grayish soil, medium acid to mildly alkaline reaction, low available P and CaMg but adequate with O.M., constant extractable KBSP and CEC; generally moderate fertility level, very low infiltration and moderate to slow permeability rate, submerged and very poorly drained.
- Beach Ridges and Swales (LMU 03) is shallow to moderately deep, very dark brown, coarse, and loamy underlain by sandy skeletal substratum; slightly acid to mutual moderate CaMg and CEC; available highly extractable K acid; BSP generally moderate fertility level; rapid to very rapid infiltration and rapid to moderate rapid permeability rate, and excessively drained.
- Estuarin Plain (LMU 04) is deep to very deep clay, predominantly very dark brown, yellowish brown, coarse, loamy underlain by sandy skeletal substratum; medium acid to neutral soil reaction; moderate exchangeable K, high O.M. content, available P, BSP and CEC; generally high fertility level; slow to very slow infiltration and rapid to moderately rapid permeability rate, and moderately well to poorly drained.
- Broad Plain (LMU 09) is moderately deep and sometimes shallow predominantly brown fine, loamy and sometimes coarse, loamy sub-soil underlain by coarse loamy skeletal stratum; strong acid to slightly acid, moderately available P, extractable K and Ca/Mg; adequate O.M. content CEC and BSP, moderate general fertility level; very slow to very rapid permeability rate, poorly to well drained, none to moderate flooding.

Warm Cool Hillyland:

- Shale/Sandstones Hills (LMU 70) is moderately shallow to very deep, predominantly dark, yellowish brown, and strong fine loamy and sometimes clayey subsoil underlain by skeletal substratum; medium soil to mildly alkaline reaction, low O.M. content and available P, high extractable K, Ca/Mg, BS and CEC generally moderate fertility level, slow to moderate permeability, moderate to well drained.

=== Soil classifications ===
The soil map reveals that the municipality is composed of 9 soil types, namely:

- Dolo Sandy clay loam and sandy loam
- Minoro Loam
- Venagre Clay loam and sandy loam
- Huyon-huyon Sandy loam
- Kinalansan Silty clay loam and Clay
- Magsaysay Sandy Loam
- San Miguel Silty Loam
- Porous rocks & clay load
- Sandy soil

It is also noted that the soil composition of the low-lying areas is rich loamy characterized as broad alluvial plains. However, the inherent soil fertility is generally moderate because of the moderate levels of calcium and magnesium contents that would be adequate for normal growth of crops. Meanwhile, the solids of the coastal plains are generally deep to poorly drained while beach ridges are shallow, coarse and loamy. These areas are noted to be moderately fertile due to low organic matter content; while some areas are poorly drained and prone to tidal floods usually occurring in barangays Sabang, Dolo, and Kinalansan.

On the other hand, soils that came from shales and sandstones can be found in barangay Adiangao. These are noted to be moderately shallow to moderately deep, fine loamy to clayey. Generally, it is high in fertility brought about by adequate levels of soil reaction, organic matter content, and permeability. However, soil limitations may include heavy texture, erosion hazard, surface stoniness as well as the presence of rock outcrops and shallow soils.

=== Soil Erosion and Landslide Susceptibility ===
The lands that are prone to erosion account for about 8.04% of the total land area and they have slopes ranging from 30%-50%. However, the erosion map of the municipality revealed that only 8.49% of the total land area are observed to be slightly eroded while no apparent erosion occurred in the rest of the territory.

Area Distribution by Erosion Hazard
Descriptions	Area (Has.)	% to Total
E0 - No Apparent Erosion	4,303.5456	91.51
E1 - Slight Erosion	399.2690	8.49
E2 - Moderate Erosion	-	-
Unclassified	-	-
Total	4,702.8146	100.00

Source: MPT Estimates

=== Flooding hazard ===
It has been noted that most of the municipal area or 92.14% is free from the hazards of flooding. However, there is a slight seasonal flooding or about 1.67% that usually occur in barangay Minoro and in the northern part of Dolo which covers about 78.54 hectares. The flood reaches a depth of less than 0.5 to 1.0 meter after heavy downpour. It would usually recede within 12 hours to a maximum of one day. Likewise, seasonal flooding is moderately experienced in some portions of barangays Dolo, Manzana, Kinalansan, Telegrafo and Calalahan with a depth of about 0.75 to 1.50 meters which would usually recedes within a few days only.

Area Distribution by Flooding Hazard
Mapping Symbol	Descriptions	Area (in Has.)	% to Total
F0	No flooding	4,333.1734	92.14
F1	Slight Seasonal Flooding	78.5370	1.67
F2	Moderate Seasonal Flooding	291.1042	6.19
	Total	4,702.8146	100.00

Source: Municipal Comprehensive Landuse Plan & Zoning Ordinance (2000-2010)

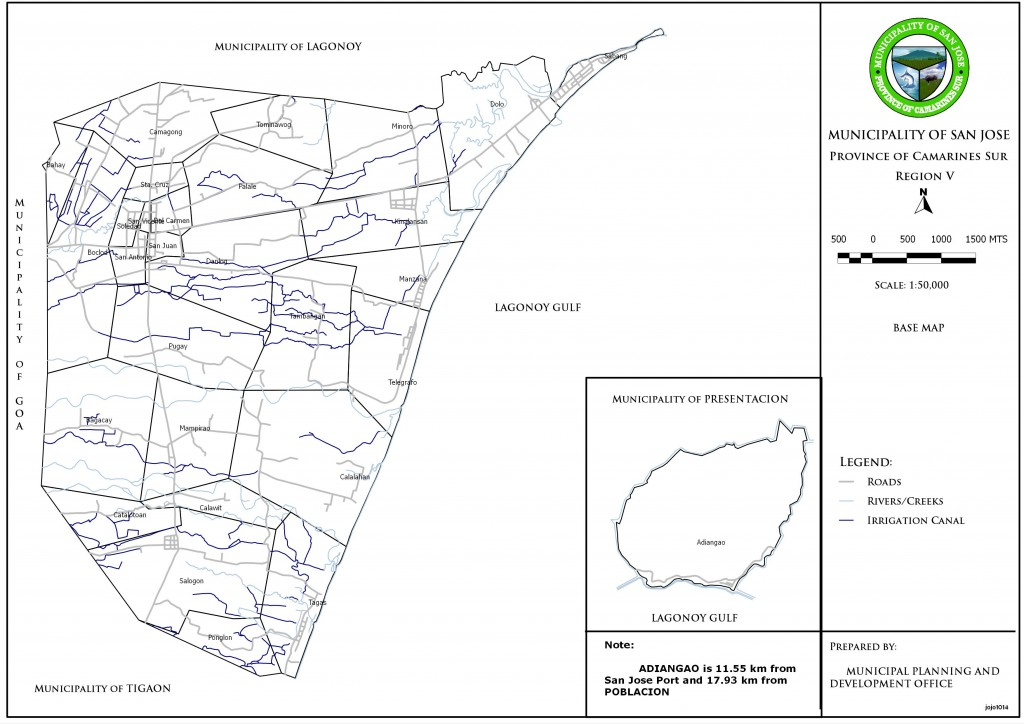
This is the municipal base map of the Municipality of San Jose.

=== Rivers and creeks ===
There are a number of creeks and rivers that crisscross the municipality and all draining towards Lagonoy Gulf. These bodies of water are being feed by spring sources from Mt. Isarog. These rivers and creeks are most frequently being utilized not only for irrigation purposes of existing paddies but also for the day to day human activities such as bathing and washing.

=== Marine ecosystem ===
The municipality has a total length of shoreline along Lagonoy Gulf of 11.30 km. which is about 3.15% of the 358.70 km. of shoreline found within the 4th District of Camarines Sur. The fine beach sand in the area makes it suitable for natural harbors as well as refuge for ships and motorbancas during the peak of weather disturbances. Moreover, a variety of marine life and species are notably abounding in the municipal waters that provided a rich source of livelihood among coastal families. At present, there are two separate municipal ports, one located in barangay Sabang and the San Jose Fishing Port in Sitio Talisay, of barangay Dolo. They most frequently served as docking points for both inter-island passenger motorbancas and fishing vessels operating in Lagonoy Gulf.

=== Land classification ===
The entire land area of San Jose with 4,702.8146 hectares is classified as alienable and disposable. The existing land use and vegetation is composed of 62.04% for Paddy rice irrigated with 90-100% dominant land use; 26.48% for Coconuts; 7.33% for Build-up areas; 2.54% for Mangrove-tree type; and 1.61% for Beach sand.

Area Distribution by Slope Category
Mapping Symbol	Slope Class (%)	Descriptions	Area (Has.)	% to Total
M	0 - 3	Level to nearly level	4,324.7083	91.96
N	3 - 8	Gently rolling to undulating	-	-
O	8 - 18	Undulating to rolling	-	-
P	18 - 30	Rolling to moderately steep	-	-
Q	30 - 50	Steep	378.1063	8.04
P	>50%	Very Steep	-	-

Source: Municipal Comprehensive Landuse Plan & Zoning Ordinance (2000-2010)

=== Primelands ===
The primelands of the municipality have been categorized into three (3), namely: Agricultural, Forestry, and Miscellaneous areas.

Pedo-Ecological Zone
Mapping Symbol	Descriptions	Area (in Has.)	% to Total
1.1.1	Paddy Rice irrigated	2,918.0965	62.05
1.1.9	Coconut	942.4440	20.04
1.3.2	Preservation (mangrove/nipa)	81.3587	1.73
2.1	Preservation/Forest Areas	14.5787	0.31
2.2	Agro-Forestry Areas	374.7483	7.97
3.1	Built-up Areas	371.5884	7.90

Source: Municipal Comprehensive Landuse Plan & Zoning Ordinance (2000-2010)

The agricultural areas is composed of about 82.09% or 3,860.54 hectares consisting the 2,918.0965 hectares of irrigated paddy riceland and 942.4440 hectares of coconut plantation. Forestry areas cover 414.7883 hectares, of which about 3.51% or 14.5787 hectares each compose the preservation forest and agro-forestry areas; while 19.61% or 81.3587 hectares are both mangrove trees and nipa plants categorized also as preservation areas. On the other hand, built-up areas is only about 7.05% of 331.5484 hectares of the total land area of the municipality.

Furthermore, based on the Pedo-ecological Zone Map of the town, around 90.13% or 4,238.6468 hectares of the total land area are under the warm lowland zone with a slope not greater than 8% and elevation of 100 meters above sea level. In the same context, about 8.35% or 392.6850 hectares are categorized as warm cool hilly land, usually found in barangay Adiangao; and miscellaneous areas composed the so-called Miscellaneous areas which is about 1.52% or with a land area of about 71.4828 hectares.

Meantime, the details on pedo-ecological zone based on the total land area can be found in the table below:

Pedo-Ecological Zone
Mapping Symbol	Descriptions	Area (in Has.)	% to Total
1	Warm Lowland - less than 8% slope 100 m elevation, greater 25 °C	4,238.6468	90.13
3	Warm cool hilly land, greater than 18% slope 500 m	392.6850	8.35
4	Miscellaneous	71.4828	1.52
-	Total	4,702.8146	100.00

Source: Municipal Comprehensive Landuse Plan & Zoning Ordinance (2000-2010)

=== Land Use Opportunity ===
Based on the table below, the Land Use Opportunity Map of the municipality indicate that there are four classes of land use opportunity available which include 83.76% or 3,939.08 hectares for active agricultural areas; 5.18% or 243.61 hectares for rehabilitation areas; 2.17% or 102.05 for wetland areas; and 8.89% or 418.08 hectares for miscellaneous land usage. More specifically, the active agricultural areas though used for agricultural cultivation can be intended for complementary uses for human settlements and infrastructure development such as the construction of roads, bridges, and irrigation facilities. Meanwhile, the miscellaneous land areas may also include the built-up areas, river wash and other miscellaneous land usages.

Pedo-Ecological Zone
Descriptions	Area (in Has.)	% to Total
Active Agricultural Areas	3,939.0775	83.76
Agricultural Expansion Areas	-	-
Rehabilitation/Reservations Areas	243.6058	5.18
Wetland Areas	102.0511	2.17
Miscellaneous Areas	418.0802	8.89
Total	4,702.8146	100.00

Source: Municipal Comprehensive Landuse Plan & Zoning Ordinance (2000-2010)

=== Existing Land Use and Vegetation ===
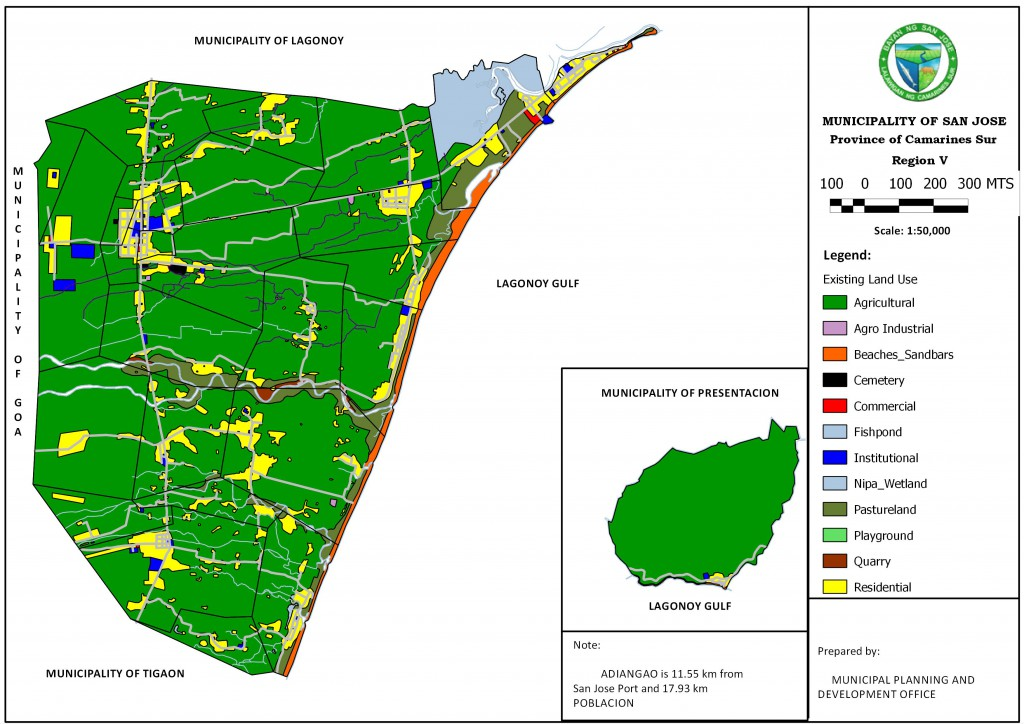
This map provides the existing land utilization in the Municipality of San Jose.

The agricultural land areas composed about 88.52% of the total land area or 4,162.9315 hectares are planted with both palay and coconut trees. On the other hand, the wetland areas cover about 2.54% of the total land areas with 119.4515 hectares and 1.61% composed the sandy beaches with the land area of 75.7153 hectares; while about 7.33% or 344.7163 hectares consisted the built-up land areas. Details are shown in the table below:

Existing Land Use and Vegetation
Land Use	Descriptions	Area (in Has.)	% to Total
Agricultural Areas	Paddy Rice Irrigated with 90-100% dominant land use	2,917.6262	62.04
	Coconut	1,245.3053	26.48
Miscellaneous	Built-up Areas	344.7163	7.33
Wetland	Mangrove tree-type	119.4515	2.54
Beach Sand		75.7153	1.61
	Total	4,702.8146	100.00

Source: Municipal Comprehensive Landuse Plan & Zoning Ordinance (2000-2010)

=== Mineral Resources ===
The municipality has been endowed with a variety of mineral resources because of its diverse geological terrain which are partly located within the mountain ranges of Caramoan Peninsula. It has been known that the marble deposit in barangay Adiangao has an estimated volume of 71,772,912 metric tons; and it has been contained along the Maangas-Adiangao area and believed to be suitable for dimension stones.

There is noted also a considerable amount of deposit of "guano" inside the Adiangao Caves. On the other hand, high quality sand, gravels and boulders are abundantly found along the Rangas River traversing barangays Bagacay, Mampirao, Pugay, Calalahan, Tambangan and Calawit.

=== Volcanoes, Faults, and Earthquake Belt ===
The parallel location of the Bicol Volcanic Belt, or Philippine Fault Zone, to the Deep Philippine Trench practically contributed to the triangulated distribution of events with faults or volcanic abnormalities within the earthquake belts in the Bicol Region. It has been observed that the Bicol Volcanic Belt or Chain had a span of 240 km. from Camarines Norte in the North down to Sorsogon in the South with a total of 16 volcanoes separately spread over by about 24 km. apart and rested parallel along the 200 km. chain west of the Philippine Trench, which is the major source of earthquake in the region. The trench can be described as a long, narrow, and generally steep-sided very deep depression in the ocean floor. The axis of a trench marks, the position of a subduction zone where old oceanic lithospheric plates begin their descent into the Earth's interior.

In 1987, a study was conducted which reveals that the Bicol Region particularly the location of San Jose is a part prone to earthquakes of intensify 5 from the above-cited source zones. Based on the frequency of volcanic eruptions that occurred in the region, there are three prominent volcanoes which are considered to be active, namely: Mt. Mayon, Mt. Bulusan, and Mt. Iriga (Asog). The latter is the nearest to the Municipality of San Jose.

Mount Iriga (Asog) has a peak of 1,143 meters above sea level and classified to be "stratovolcanoe" or it has a composite cone like that of Mt. Mayon and last record of eruption was in 1628 A.D. which eventually damned the Barit River but consequently created the Lake Buhi, the home of the smallest fish in the world with scientific name Pandaka pygmaea locally known as "tabios."

== Demographics ==
Population census of San Jose
Year	Pop.	±% p.a.
1903	8,314	—
1918	8,710	+0.31%
1939	10,722	+0.99%
1948	12,788	+1.98%
1960	16,704	+2.25%
1970	20,343	+1.99%
1975	21,859	+1.45%
1980	23,898	+1.80%
1990	27,517	+1.42%
1995	31,362	+2.48%
2000	32,512	+0.77%
2007	35,768	+1.33%
2010	38,523	+2.74%
2015	40,623	+1.02%
2020	43,973	+1.68%
2024	44,688	+0.39%
Source: Philippine Statistics Authority

In the 2024 census, the population of San Jose was 44,688 people, with a density of 1,000 inhabitants per square kilometre or 2,600 inhabitants per square mile.

The population projection was computed based on Geometric formula resulting to an average annual increase of 2.62%. Based on projections, the ten most populated barangays will be composed of Calalahan, Sabang, Salogon, Kinalansan, Dolo, Pugay, Tagas, Danlog, Tambangan, and Mampirao. As computed, the population projection by age group 22–35 years old registered the highest percentage share at 17.45% followed by 10-14 age cohort by 13.62%; 36–45 years old by 10.31%; 46–59 years old by 8.99%; and 7–9 years old by 8.85%.

=== Gender structure and employment ===
In San Jose, there are more males than females. Males outnumbered the females by 0.82%. The computed gender ratio is 1.02% or equivalent to 102 males for every 100 females.

Population 15 years old & over by Gender and Employment Status
Gender	Population	Employed	%	Unemployed	%	Not in Labor Force	%
Male	10,735	6,124	57.05	4,192	39.05	419	3.90
Female	7,841	1,365	17.41	5,873	74.90	603	7.69
Total	18,576	7,489	40.32	10,065	54.18	1,022	5.50

== Economy ==
Poverty incidence of San Jose (%)

Source: Philippine Statistics Authority

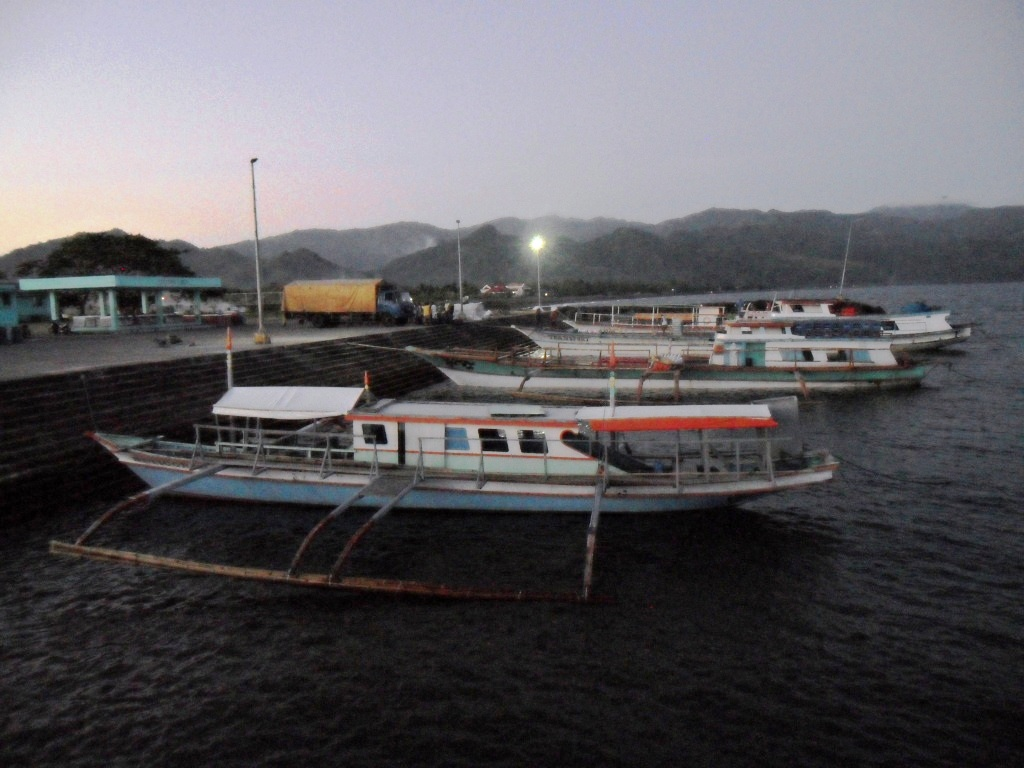
Harbor of Dolo/Sabang

Majority of the households are engaged in farming, livestock raising (either backyard or commercial scale), or in fishing. Some are employed in the government and private offices and others are engaged in business, trading or are self-employed.

A number of agro-related industries are present in San Jose, including welding shops, manufacturers of threshers, hand tractor, cart and plows, ice making and cold storage facilities, rural banks, and several rice mills.

Local products include:

- Rice is the major agricultural crop grown. Other crops planted in the municipality are coconut, root crops, vegetables and fruit-bearing trees.
- Various livestock raisers in all barangays. Numerous commercial raisers engaged in egg production. Produce are marketed in neighboring towns and Naga City.
- Bangus fry, fished in Lagonoy Gulf, is abundant and contributes to the revenues of the municipality.

=== Commerce ===
The commercial activities of the town are considered as small-scale with capitalization ranging from ₱50,000 to ₱5,000,000 only. About 60.75% of the 48 business establishments are general stores. Other commercial establishments include palay traders, cono ricemill, feed dealers, bakeries, welding shops, vulcanizing shops, photo studio, cable TV operators, gasoline stations, blacksmith, textile, rural bank and drugstores.

The municipal public market located at barangay Boclod has a total of 112 stalls with sizes ranging from 4x6 meters to 2.75 and 2.25 meters or an area per stall of 6.87 sq.m. to 24 sq.m. Some stalls have already been occupied/rented while others remained vacant.

The proximity of the town to Goa which is considered as the major trading center in the Partido District, and the low population level and the population growth rate of the municipality are considered to be the reasons for the underdevelopment of commerce and trade. Aside from the small market base, most of the consumers prefer to shop in Goa where a more complete array of goods and services can be found.

== Government ==
=== List of former chief executives ===
Many prominent men took turns in holding the reins of the government from 1813 up to 1903 as Capitan Municipal, Juez de la Paz and Maestro Municipal, and their names and year(s) of service can be found printed at the walls of the lobby of the municipal building.

In the history of the local chief executives, the only woman elected as mayor was Salvacion R. Valer from 1960 to 1963.

Spanish period Capitan Municipal:

- Don Macario Agustin, 1813
- Don Julian Fernandez, 1814
- Don Pedro Salvador, 1815
- Don Esteban de los Santos, 1816
- Don Pantaleon del Monte, 1817
- Don Macario Agustin Geronimo, 1818
- Don Francisco Fria, 1819
- Don Francisco Ramos, 1820
- Don Camilo Ursua, 1821
- Don Ignacio Ramirez, 1822
- Don Macario Fernandez, 1823
- Don Macario de la Concepcion, 1824
- Don Ignacio Ramirez, 1825
- Don Apolinario Claroniño, 1826
- Don Ignacio Ramirez, 1827
- Don Juan Feliciano, 1828
- Don Salvador Ramos, 1829
- Don Esteban de los Santos, 1830
- Don Ignacio Ramirez, 1831
- Don Anselmo Vasquez, 1832
- Don Pantaleon del Monte, 1833
- Don Juan Bautista, 1834
- Don Nicolas Saines, 1835
- Don Agapito Mendoza, 1836-1837
- Don Mariano de la Cruz, 1838
- Don Feliciano Prila, 1839
- Don Andres Peña, 1840
- Don Benigno Mendoza, 1841
- Don Nicolas Saines, 1842-1843
- Don Bernardo Geronimo, 1844
- Don Isidro de la Rosa, 1845
- Don Benigno Mendoza, 1846
- Don Manuel Patrocinio, 1847
- Don Andres Salvador Obias, 1848
- Don Andres Peña, 1849
- Don Norberto Pan, 1850
- Don Clemente Peña, 1851
- Don Andres Peña, 1852
- Don Valentin Pacamarra, 1853
- Don Guillermo Aguado, 1854
- Don Estefanio Perillo, 1855
- Don Francisco Mendoza, 1856-1858
- Don Jose Imperial, 1859
- Don Andres Peña, 1860
- Don Antonio Dizon, 1861
- Don Macario Ramirez, 1862
- Don Clemente Peña, 1863-1864
- Don Macario Ramirez, 1865-1866
- Don Mariano Peñas, 1867-1870
- Don Miguel Obias, 1871-1872
- Don Mariano Peñas, 1873-1874
- Don Ramon Fernandez, 1875-1876
- Don Diego Peña, 1877
- Don Venancio Peñas, 1877-1878
- Don Gregorio Patrocinio, 1879-1880
- Don Ramon L. Ortiz, 1881-1882
- Don Venancio Peñas, 1883-1886
- Don Mariano Purcia, 1887-1889
- Don Braulio Obias, 1890-1891
- Don Mariano Federis Perias, 1892-1894
- Don Luis Pascua, 1895-1898
- Don Braulio Obias, 1899
- Don Francisco Torregrosa, 1900-1901
- Don Miguel Obias, 1871-1872
- Don Mariano Peñas, 1873-1874

Jueces (judges):

- Don Braulio Obias
- Don Gregorio Patrocinio
- Don Manuel Imperial
- Don Ambrosio Reyes

Juez de sementera y de policia:

- Don Mariano Dizon

Maestros municipal:

- Don Juan Modino
- Dña Isidora Imperial
- Dña Marcelina Ortiz
- Dña Emilia Ortua

American regime Presidents:

- Manuel Patrocinio, 1902-1905
- Regino Palma, 1906-1907
- Domingo Primo, 1908-1909
- Juan Perez, 1910-1911
- Job Obias, 1912-1916
- Agaton Ortiz, 1917-1919
- Isaias Obias, 1920-1922
- Jovito Dizon, 1923-1925
- Jose Imperial, 1926-1928
- Jovito Dizon, 1929-1931
- Isaias Obias, 1932-1934
- Jovito Dizon, 1935-1938 (Phil. Commonwealth)
- Mariano Monasterio, 1939-1940
- Tomas Torres, 1941-1945
- Manuel Patrocinio, 1946-1951
- Tomas Torres, 1952-1956

Justice of peace:

- Gregorio Patrocinio
- Regino Palma
- Ambrosio Reyes
- Victoriano Azaña

Mayors:

- Tomas O. Obias Sr., 1956-1959
- Salvacion R. Valer, 1960-1963 (First woman Mayor)
- Regino R. Dizon Sr., 1964-1967
- Edilberto R. Valer, 1968-1971
- Gil P. Pacamarra, 1972-February 1979
- Juan C. Peña, Appointed Mayor, March 1, 1979-June 25, 1986
- Domingo T. Monasterio, Appointed OIC, June 26, 1986-December 6, 1987
- Angel P. Valencia, Appointed OIC, December 7, 1987-February 2, 1988
- Ciriaco Z. San Jose, February 3, 1988-November 6, 1993
- Napoleon R. Concina, November 8, 1993-March 20, 1995
- Gilmar S. Pacamarra, March 20, 1995-June 30, 1995
- Evelio C. Peña, June 30, 1995-June 30, 1998
- Gil P. Pacamarra, July 1, 1998-June 30, 2007
- Gilmar S. Pacamarra, July 1, 2007-June 30, 2010
- Antonio B. Chavez, July 1, 2010-June 30, 2019
- Marco P. Chavez, M.D. July 1, 2019 - June 30, 2022
- Jerold B. Peña - July 1, 2022 - Present

== Tourism ==
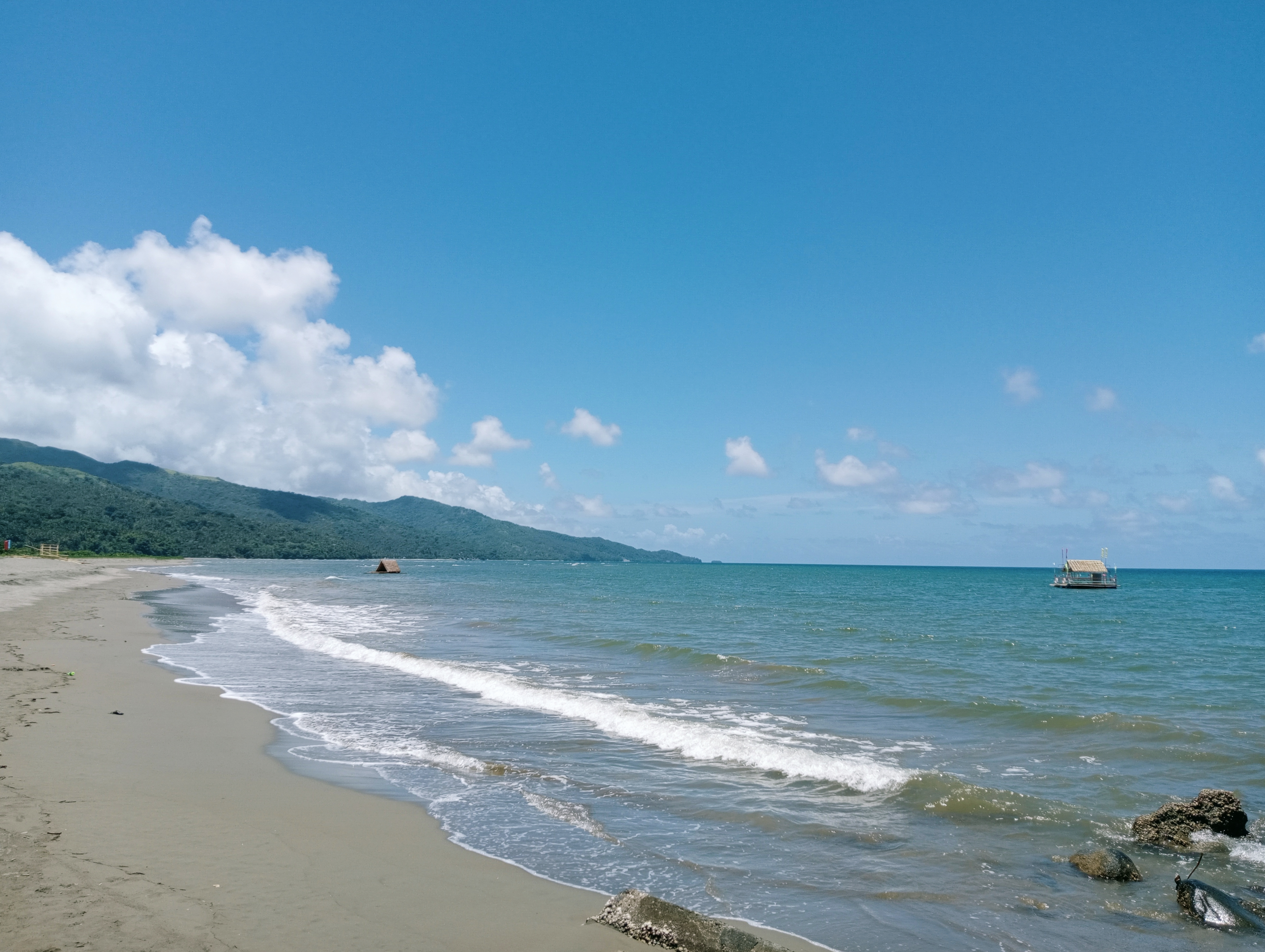
Sabang Beach

San Jose is endowed with natural tourism spots that, when fully developed, could possibly generate additional income for the municipality. This includes the numerous beaches with crystalline clear water along the coastline of Lagonoy Gulf and the Adiangao Cave at barangay Adiangao.

== Heritage sites and buildings ==
=== The municipal building ===
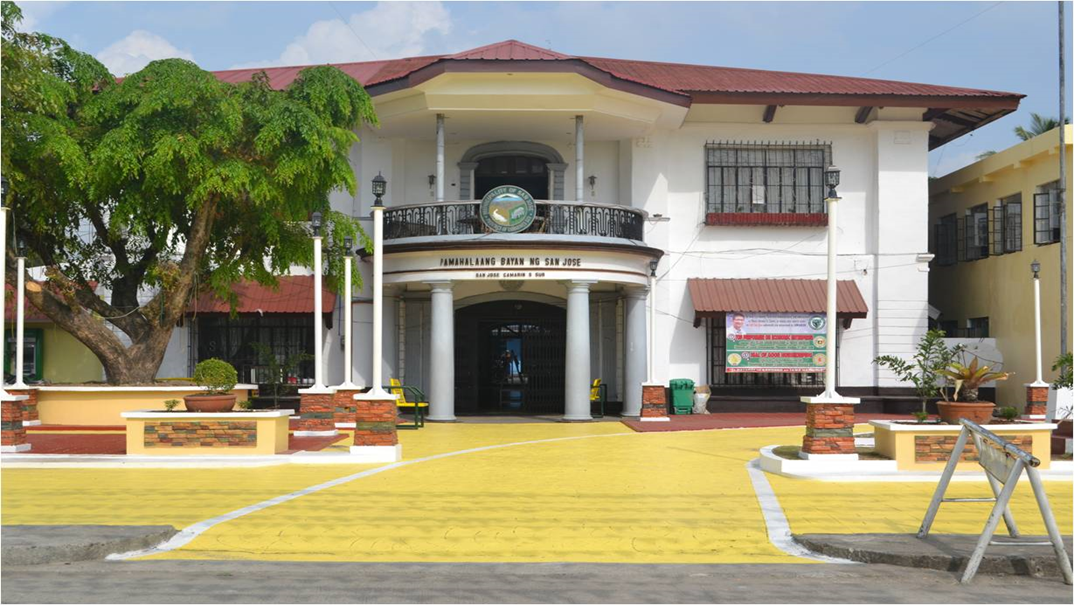
San Jose Municipal Building

Capitano Municipal Venancio Peñas initiated the building of the municipal hall in 1877.

=== The Catholic Church ===
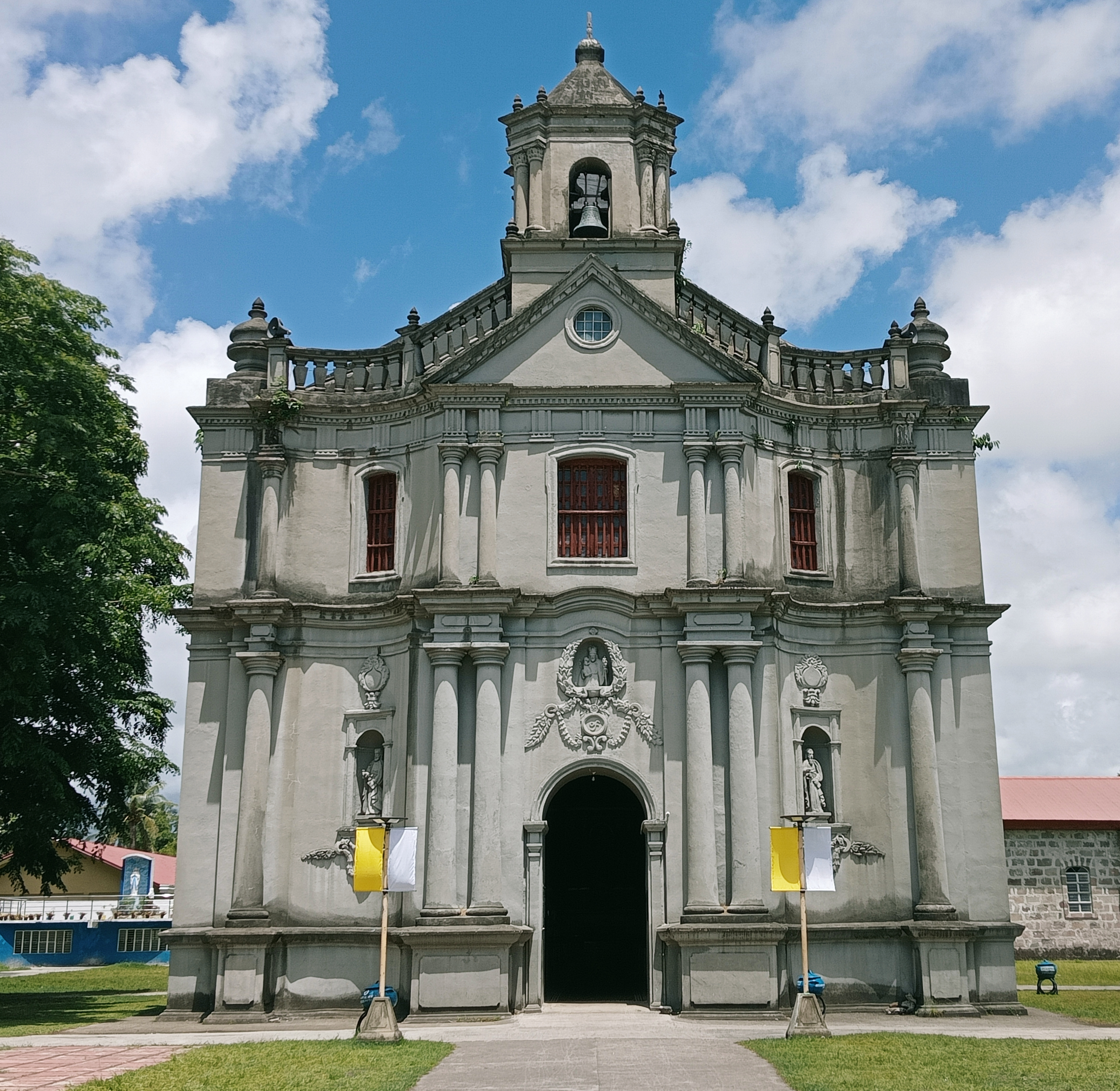
St. Joseph Parish Church

The church was built during the Spanish era.

=== Christ the King monument ===
The large monument of Christ the King (Cristo Rey) can be found at the church patio. It was donated by Primitiva Ortiz Obias and inaugurated on October 27, 1952.

=== The convent ===
The convent was built later than the church.

During World War II, the convent was known to have served as the headquarters of the American Volunteer Soldiers while the pavement was used as the jail. In 1988, the convent was converted into a preparatory seminary. In fact, its size made Archbishop Leonardo Legaspi decide to convert it into a Pre-College Seminary purposely to accommodate the growing need of the Holy Rosary Minor Seminary for a formation house.

== Infrastructure ==
=== Transportation ===
The municipality has a total of 98.046 kilometers road length consisting of the National, Provincial, Municipal and Barangay roads. Approximately 6.730 kilometers or 6.864% of the total road length are classified as National roads, 24.830 kilometers or 25.3248% are provincial roads, 4.920 kilometers or 5.018% are Municipal roads and 61.566 kilometers or 62.793% are barangay roads with varying road conditions.

There are 18 bridges existing in the area, the longest of which is located in barangay Pugay, a reinforced concrete deck girder (RCDA), one in Mampirao, Salogon, and the rest are Spanish-type bridges that are made of bricks and reinforced concrete, spillways and footbridges.

=== Water supply ===
The Partido water supply system of the Partido Development Administration (PWSS-PDA) Level III supplies the potable water. It has its water source from Lagonoy. There are 6 pipe connections from the poblacion area to the barangays of Camagong, Danlog, part of Boclod, Kinalansan, Manzana, Telegrafo, Dolo, and Sabang. The rest of the people are dependent from the artesian wells particularly in barangays along Lagonoy Gulf; as well as deepwells, shallow wells, and improved springs.

San Jose Water Supply (PWSS)
Year	Population	No. of Household	H.H. with Water Supply	Percentage
2013	41,929	7,787	7,581	97.00
2014	41,280	8,217	8,063	98.00

=== Power supply ===
As of 2010, the entire municipality has already been energized by the Camarines Sur IV Electric Cooperative (CASURECO IV). The latter supplies energy to approximately 3,260 residential connections as shown in the table below:

Numbers of Electrical Connections by User Type and Average Monthly Consumption
Type of Connection	Number	Average Monthly Consumption (kwh)
Residential	3,260	188,180.00
Commercial	44	21,568.00
Industrial	13	5,014.00
Public Buildings	29	20,131.00
Streetlights	60	1,885.24
Irrigation	-	2,407.00
Barangay Power Assn.	3	-
Total	3,409	239,185.24

=== Communication ===
There are at least 3 entities that provide the communications needs of the LGU. They are the Philippine Postal Corporation, Bayantel Group of Companies, Smart, and Globe Telecom Companies. The most common source of information, entertainment, and news is the broadcast media. All frequency signals of AM and FM radio stations based in Naga City, Legazpi City and Iriga City reached the area.

=== Sanitation ===
The table shows the household by type of sanitary toilet facilities being used:

Household by Type of Toilet Facility Being Used
Type of Toilet Facility	No. of Household	Percent to Total
Water-sealed, sewer/septic tank used exclusively by the household	423	7.00
Water-sealed, sewer/septic tank shared with households	3,808	64.00
Water-sealed, other depository shared with households	340	5.63
Closed Pit (Antipolo Type)	181	3.00
Open Pit	-	-
Others (pail system, etc.)	-	-
None	1,230	20.35
Total	6,043	100.00

== Parish priests (cura parroco) ==
The following were recorded parish priests of St. Joseph Parish: for the municipalities in the Third District of Camarines Sur.

- Salvador Mendoza, July 26, 1813-April 12, 1827
- Valentin Saenz, February 5, 1827-December 28, 1828
- Mariano Cecilio, January 1, 1829-September 3, 1830
- Francisco Flores, September 10, 1830-February 13, 1831
- Roman Mariano, March 12, 1831-May 13, 1831
- Ramon de Santa Ana, May 13, 1831-October 2, 1836
- Andres de Antonio, October 8, 1836-October 30, 1836
- Vicente Imperial, November 13, 1836-August 8, 1843
- Aniceto Fernandez, August 8, 1843-February 19, 1844
- Gabriel Prieto, February 25, 1844-December 2, 1848
- Aniceto Fernandez, December 9, 1848-April 14, 1849 & May 3, 1849-August 4, 1849
- Claro D. Nicolas, August 12, 1849-August 3, 1863
- Potenciano Roa, August 13, 1863-June 9, 1865
- Jose Inocencio, June 14, 1865-October 7, 1865
- Pedro de Milaor, October 11, 1865-June 25, 1890
- Pascual Gacosta, June 25, 1890-September 17, 1892 & September 21, 1892-December 31, 1892
- Teodorico Padilla, January 4, 1893-July 11, 1903
- Agripino Pesino, July 15, 1903-August 29, 1903
- Juan Pana, September 2, 1903-August 7, 1907
- Balbino Hernandez, October 7, 1903-August 7, 1907
- Juan Pana, August 7, 1907-April 6, 1910
- Antonio Toroda, April 19, 1910-December 31, 1910
- Vicente Barrameda, January 4, 1911-December 9, 1911
- Manuel Navea, December 11, 1911-March 30, 1912
- Severo Estrada, April 3, 1912-November 11, 1914
- Carlos Badiola, November 14, 1914-March 15, 1933
- Emilio Arejola, March 15, 1933-August 26, 1936
- Carlos Badiola, August 26, 1936-January 23, 1937
- Martin Alcazar, January 23, 1927-November 1, 1938
- Catalino Reyes, November 1, 1938-November 8, 1941
- Felix Ragos, November 8, 1941-August 28, 1945
- Antonio Reganit, August 26, 1945-January 14, 1948
- Ciriaco San Diego, January 14, 1948

== Education ==
The San Jose Schools District Office governs all educational institutions within the municipality. It oversees the management and operations of all private and public, from primary to secondary schools.

=== Primary and elementary schools ===
- Adiangao Elementary School
- Bagacay Elementary School
- Bahay Primary School
- Calalahan Elementary School
- Calawit Community School
- Camagong Elementary School
- Catalotoan Community School
- Children's Creative Playschool
- Clemente Peña Elementary School
- Connecting Point Christian Academy
- Danlog Elementary School
- Dolo Elementary School
- Instituto de Caceres San Jose (ICSJ)
- Kinalansan Elementary School
- Mampirao Elementary School
- Mampirao Grace Gospel Learning Center
- Minoro Primary School
- Obias (Pugay) Elementary School
- Palale Central School
- Sabang Elementary School
- Salogon Elementary School
- San Jose Central School
- Tagas Elementary School
- Tambangan Elementary School
- Telegrafo Elementary School
- Tominawog Elementary School

=== Secondary schools ===
- Adiangao High School
- Globaltech Programs for Progress
- Rangas Ramos National High School
- Salogon High School
- San Jose National High School
- Villafuerte-Peña High School
- Vivencio Obias - Kinalansan National High School

== Bibliography ==
- Alcina, Francisco as quoted by Felipe Landa Jocano. "Philippines at the Spanish Contact: An Essay in Ethnohistory" in Brown Heritage: Essays on Philippine Cultural Tradition and Literature. Antonio G. Manuud (ed.) Quezon City: Ateneo de Manila University Press, 1967.
- Demetrio, Francisco R. SJ. Encyclopedia of Philippine Folk Beliefs and Customs. Cagayan de Oro City: Xavier University, c1991.
- De Huerta, Fr. Felix. ESTADO geografico, topografico, estadistico, historic-religioso. Imprenta de los Amigos del Pais, a cargo de D.M. Sanchez. 1855 Manila.
- Dy-Liacco, Leonor R. Mga Osipon ni Tiyong Juan saka ni Tiyang Laling. Eva Zabaldica and Shiela Dy-Liacco (eds.), Hong Kong: Regal Printing Co., (no date)
- Dy-Liacco, Leonor R. "Folk Stories of Our Elders" in Sarong Dolot sa Satuyang Ina. Manila: J&R Printing Company, Inc., 1996
- Eugenio, Damiana L. Philippine Folktales: An Introduction. Asian Folklore Studies. Vol. 44, 1985
- Fansler, Dean S. Filipino Popular Tales. Hatboro, Penn: Folklore Associates, 1921, c1965.
- General, Luis Jr., Lydia SD. San Jose, and Rosalio Al. Parrone (eds.) Readings on Bikol Culture. Naga City: University of Nueva Caceres, 1972, p. 265
- Gerona, Danilo M. "Pre-Colonial Culture" From Epic to History: A Brief Introduction to Bicol History. Naga City, AMS Press, 1988.
- Gerona, Danilo M. The History of Education in Kabikolan (1578-1935) in Camarines by the Vicor River. Jose Fernando Obias, Danilo M. Gerona, and Fr. Danilo T. Imperial (eds.) Camarines Sur: Office of the Governor, 1999.
- Jagor, Feodor. (1870) "On the Natives of Naga, in Luzon, Philippine Islands", The Journal of the Ethnological Society of Luzon. 2(2).
- Malcolm W. Mintz. Bicol Dictionary. Honolulu: University of Hawaii Press, c1971.
- O'Brien, James J., SJ. The Historical and Cultural Heritage of the Bikol People, 1st edition, 1966; 2nd Edition, 1968, supplement, 1970; 3rd edition, 1993.
- Owen, Norman G. The Bikol Blend: Bikolanos and their History. Quezon City: New Day Publishers, c1998.
- Realubit, Maria Lilia F. Bikol Literary History. (No publication details)
- Rojas, Msgr. J. "History of Holy Rosary Preparatory Seminary". (Unpublished manuscript)

== Notable people ==
- Victor Neri - actor, singer, entrepreneur, chef, and public servant
