= Santa Cruz, San Jose =

Santa Cruz, San Jose may refer to any of the following barangays in the Philippines:

- Santa Cruz, San Jose, Camarines Sur
- Santa Cruz, San Jose, Dinagat Islands
