= Mount Iriga =

Active stratovolcano in Camarines Sur, Philippines

- Mount Asog; Mount Sumagang
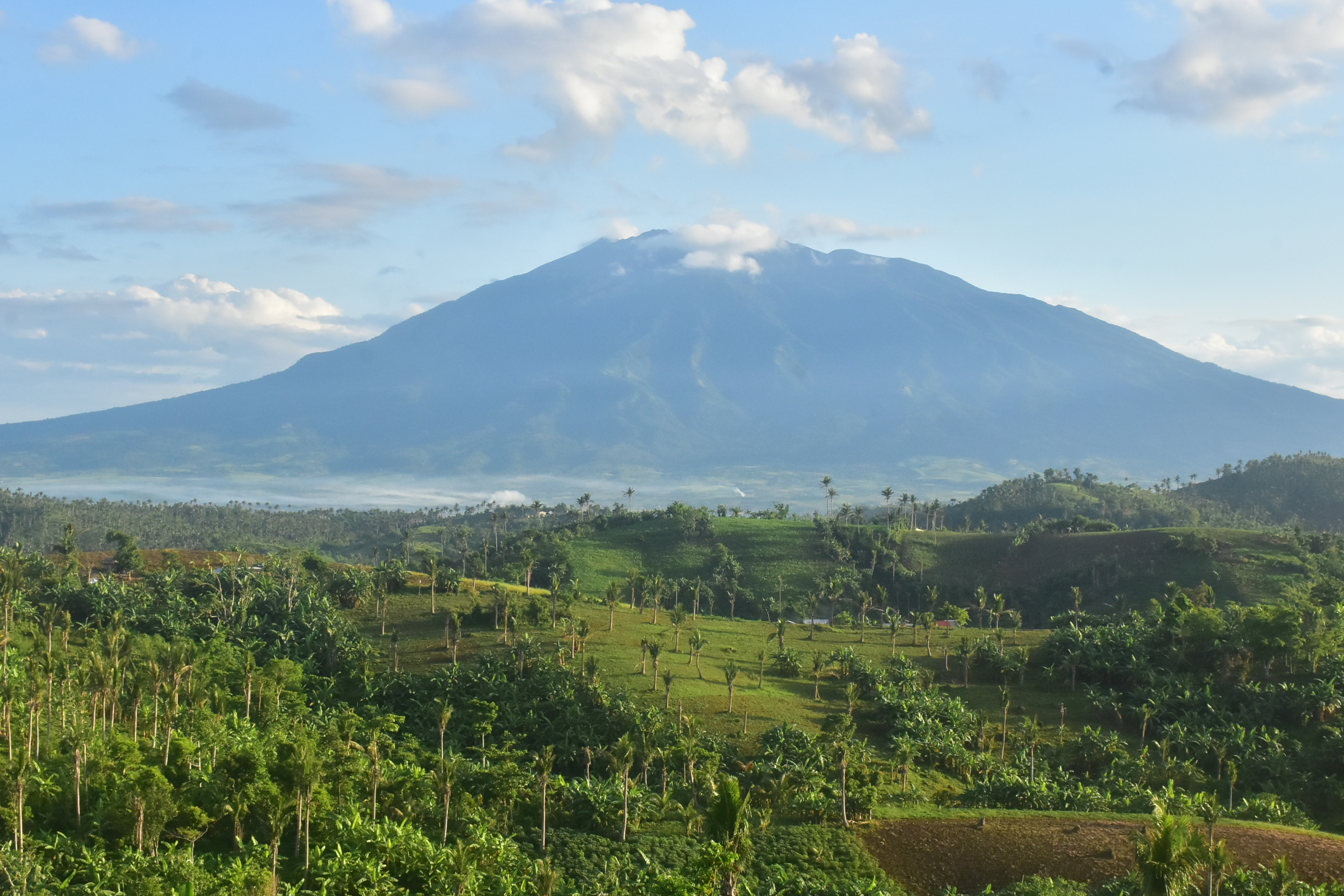
- Mount Asog

Highest point
- Elevation: 1,196 m (3,924 ft)
- Prominence: 1,009 m (3,310 ft)
- Listing: Active volcanoes in the Philippines
- Coordinates: 13°27′24″N 123°27′24″E

Geography
- Location within Luzon Location within Philippines
- Country: Philippines
- Region: Bicol Region
- Province: Camarines Sur
- City/municipality: Buhi; Iriga

Geology
- Rock age: Quaternary
- Mountain type: Stratovolcano
- Volcanic zone: Bicol Volcanic Chain
- Last eruption: 1642

Mount Iriga, also known as Mount Asog or Mount Sumagang, is a dormant stratovolcano in the province of Camarines Sur, in the Philippines.

It is a andesitic stratovolcano about a kilometer from Lake Buhi. It rises 1,196 m (3,924 ft) with a base diameter of 10 kilometres (6.2 mi).

Mount Iriga, generally known for its phreatic explosions, erupted in 1628 and 1642. After these eruptions, it remained dormant.

It has a large crater at the southeast that formed due to a large flank faliure that caused a debris avalanche that buried several villages 4 kilometers away from the summit.

It is said that its alternative name Mount Asog, was named after a datu of the Agta people, named Asog, who controlled the region. However, some scholars say that "Asog" comes from the Buhinon term for a dog in heat, which is inaasog.

Mount Sumagang, the other name, is said to mean "mountain of the rising sun." Oral literature claims that it comes from the Bicol phrase "agang sumarang" which means "early to rise."

The mountain has several natural springs, which are the source of clean water for its residents and for neighboring towns.

== Gallery ==
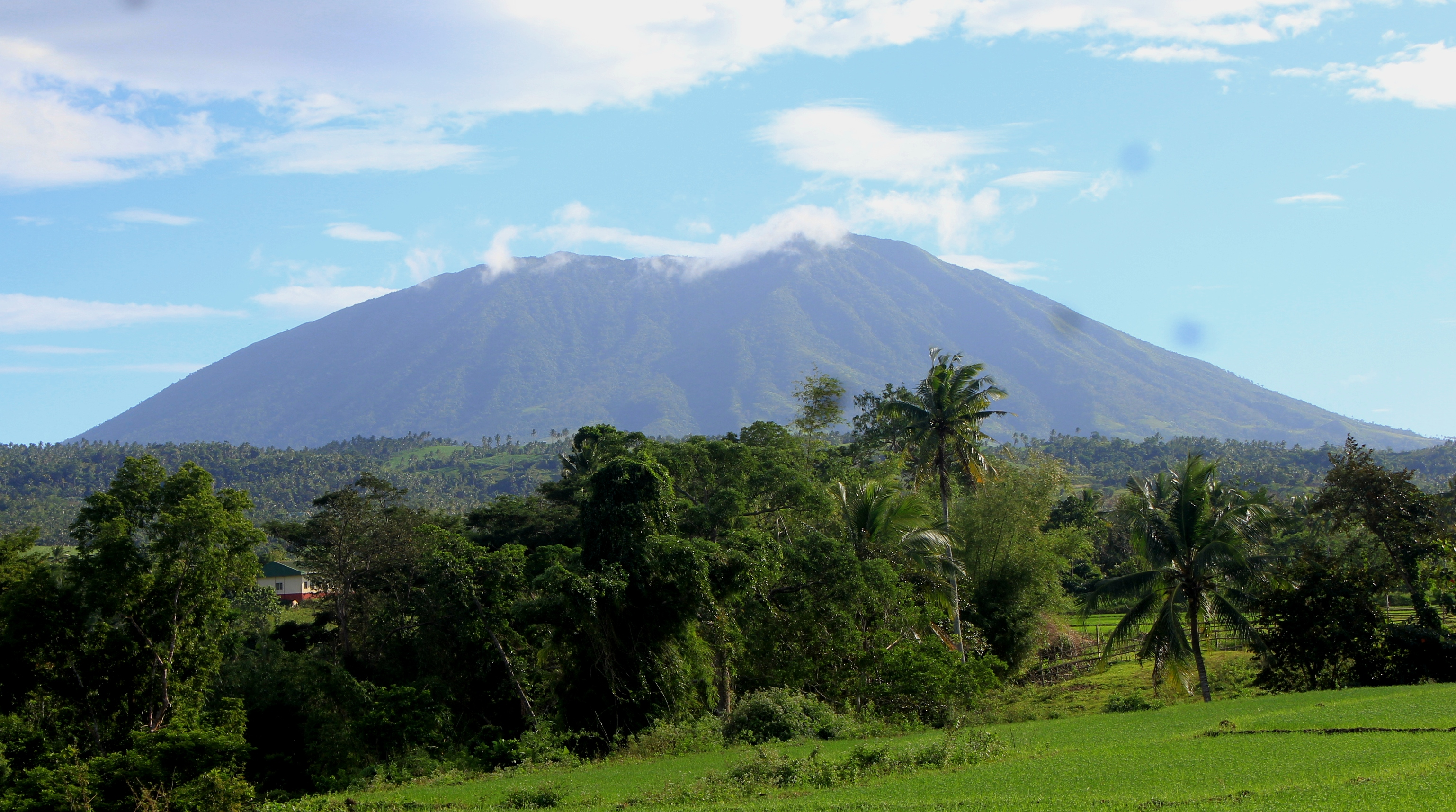
View from San Ramon, Iriga

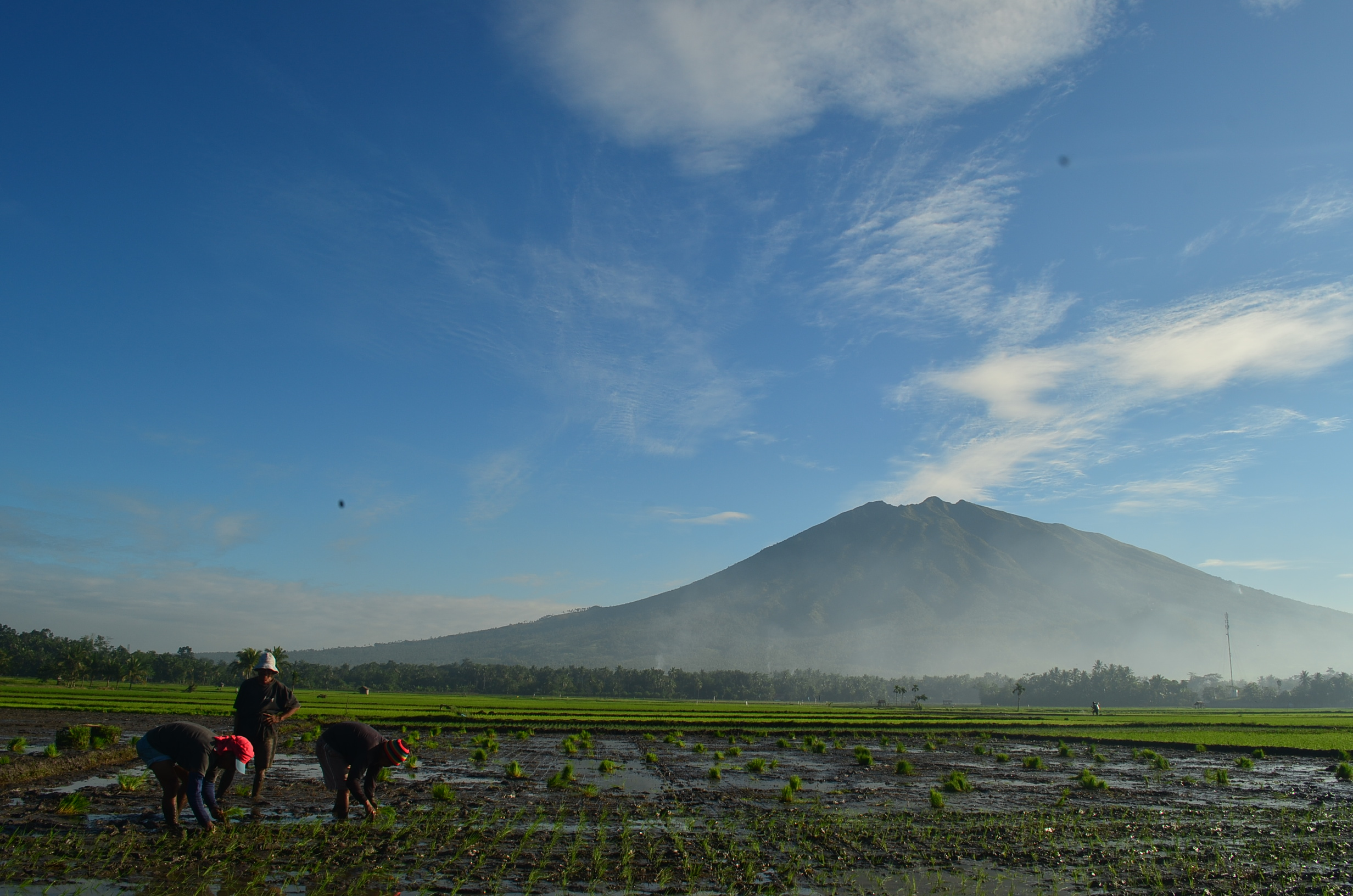
View from San Jose, Iriga

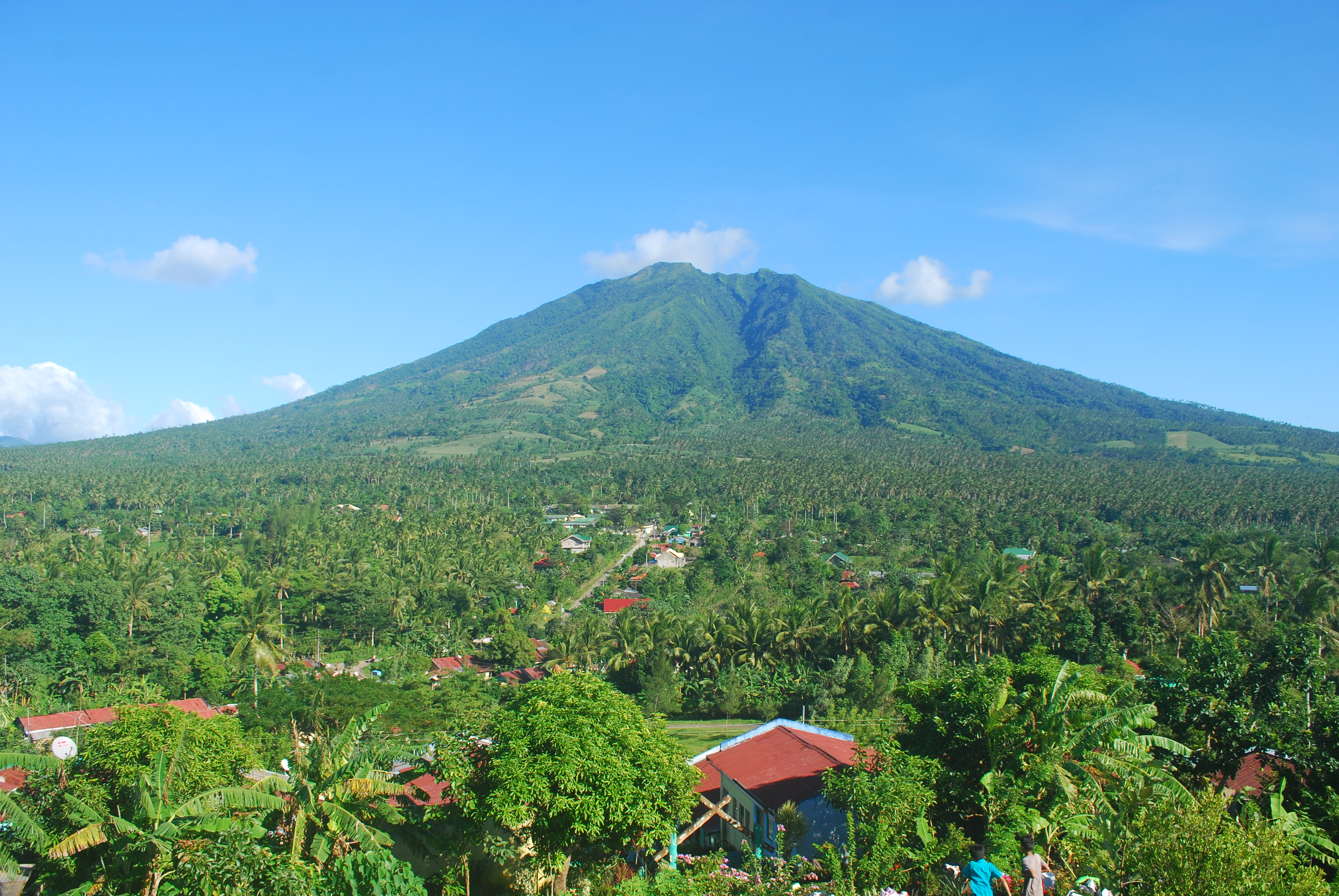
View from Perpetual Help, Iriga

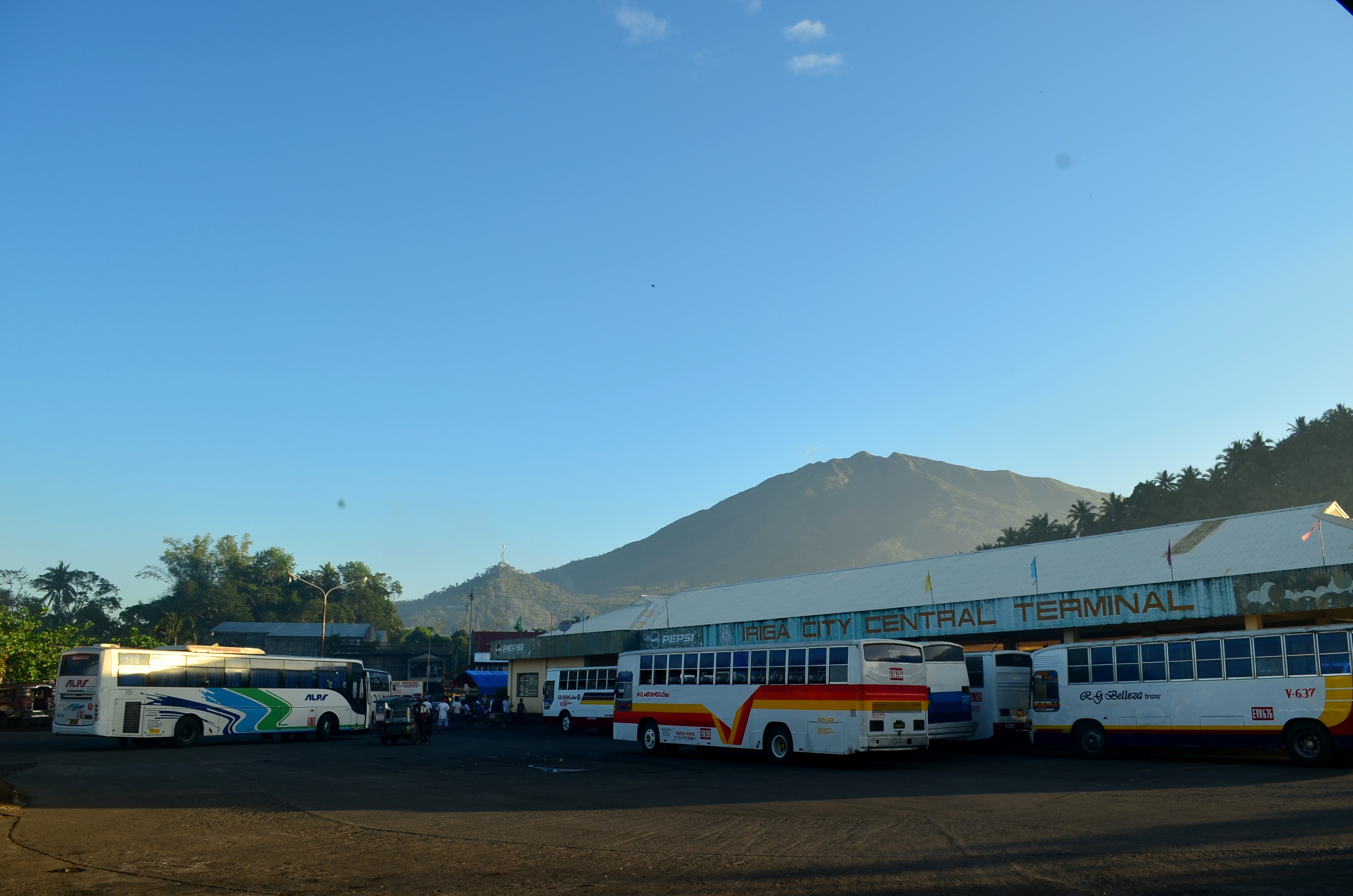
View from Iriga Central Terminal

== See also ==
- List of volcanoes in the Philippines
  - List of active volcanoes in the Philippines
  - List of potentially active volcanoes in the Philippines
  - List of inactive volcanoes in the Philippines
- Philippine Institute of Volcanology and Seismology
- Iriga City
