= Lagonoy =

Municipality in Camarines Sur, Philippines

- Municipality
- Municipality of Lagonoy
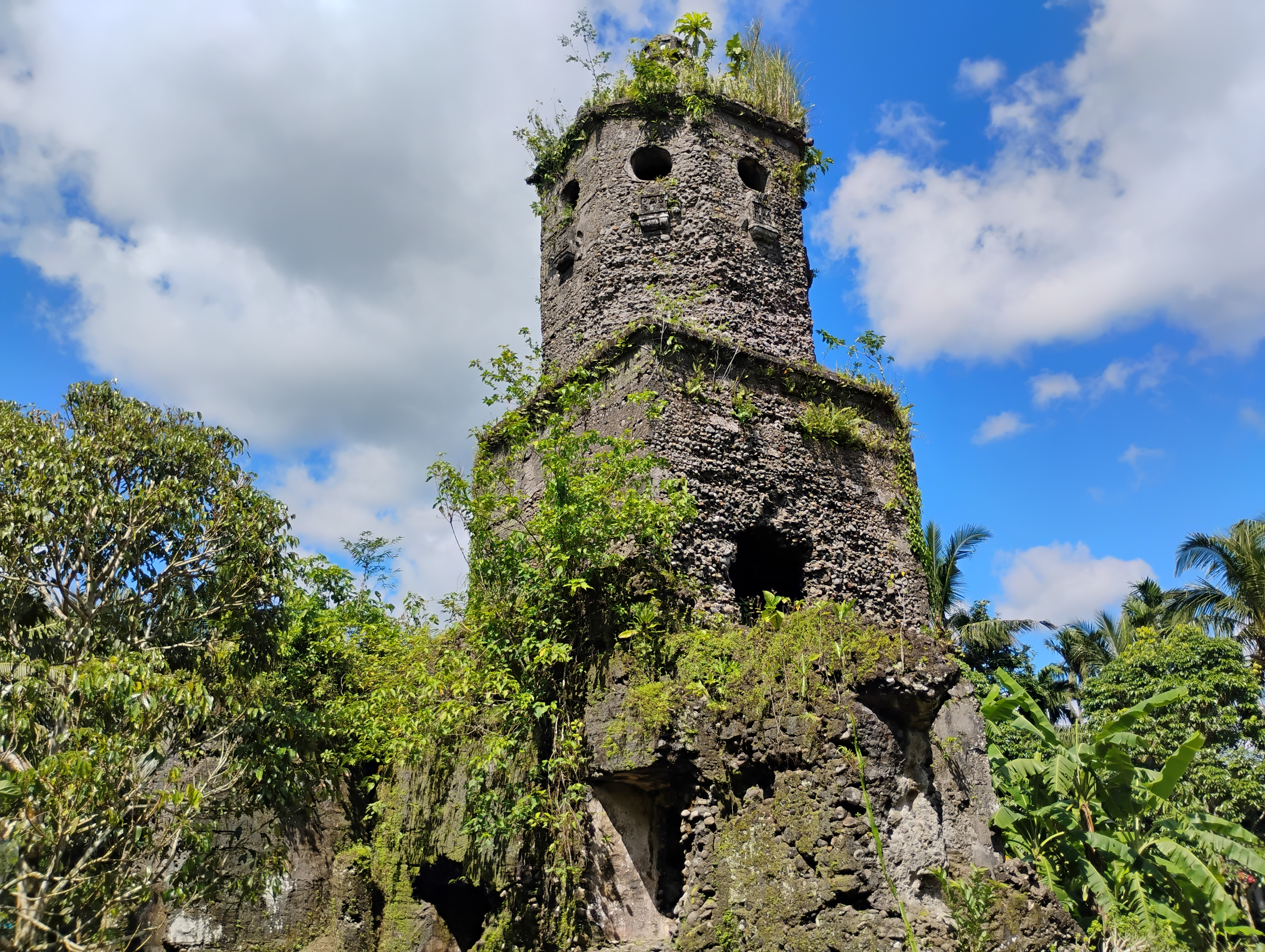
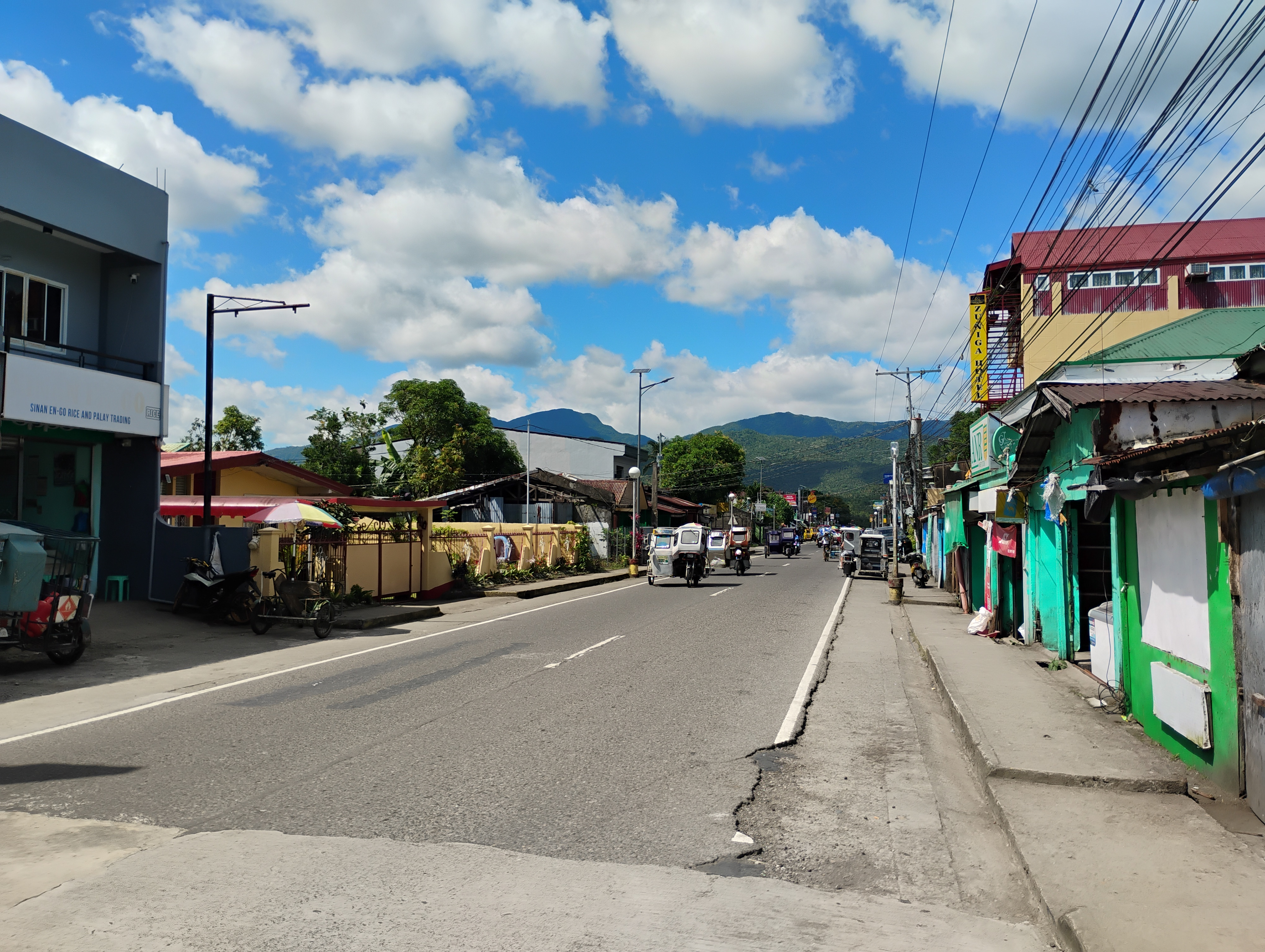
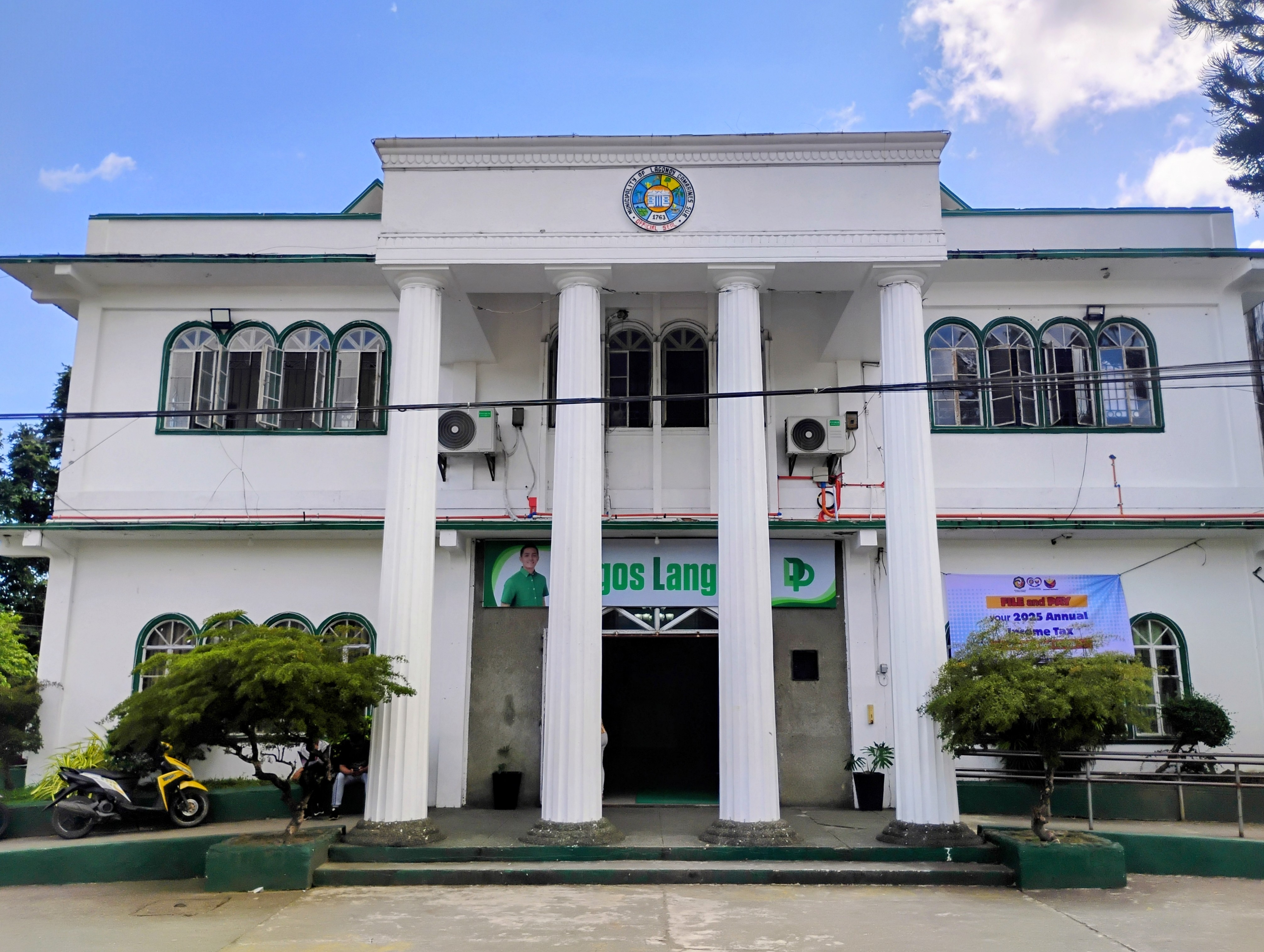
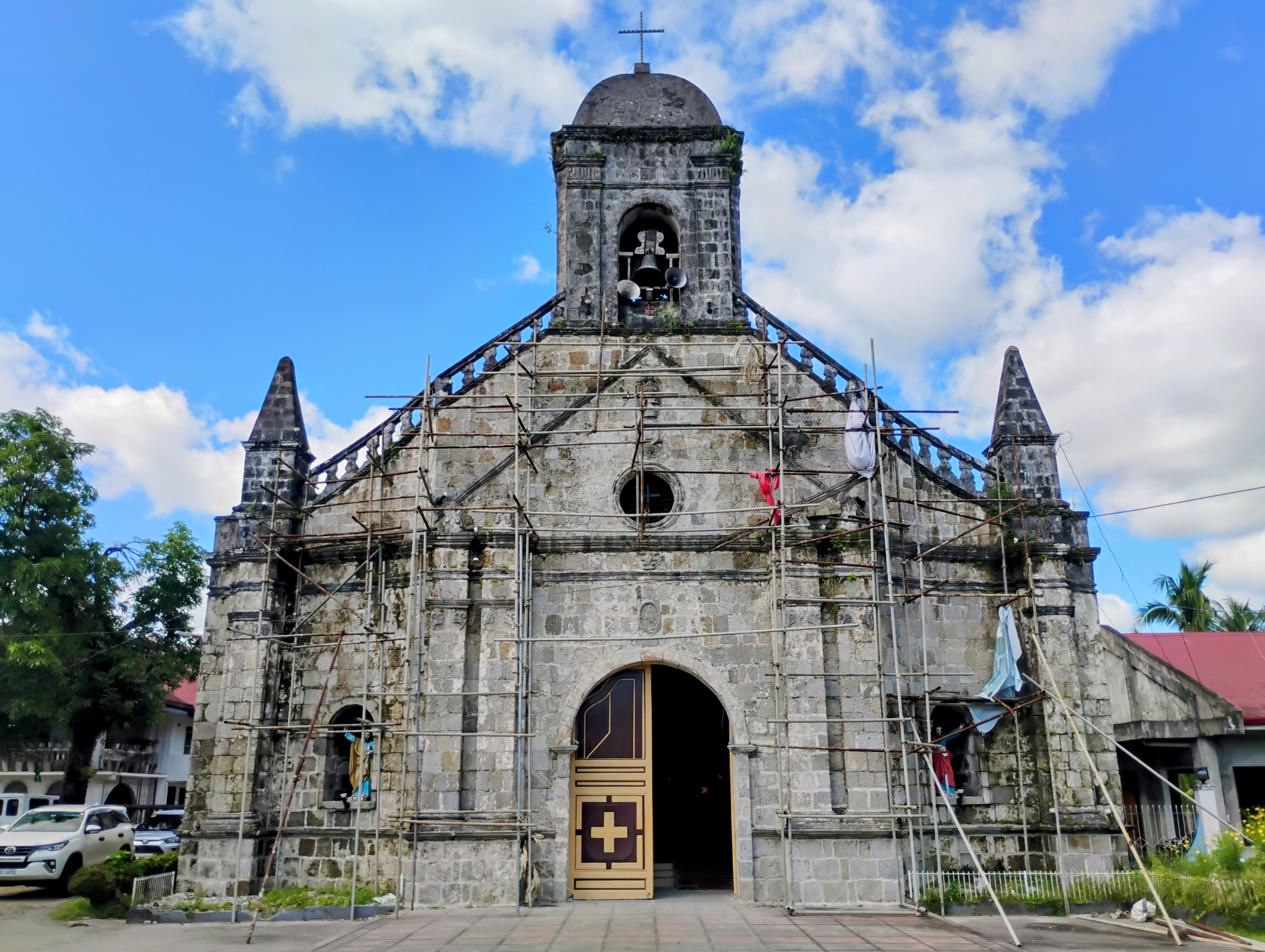
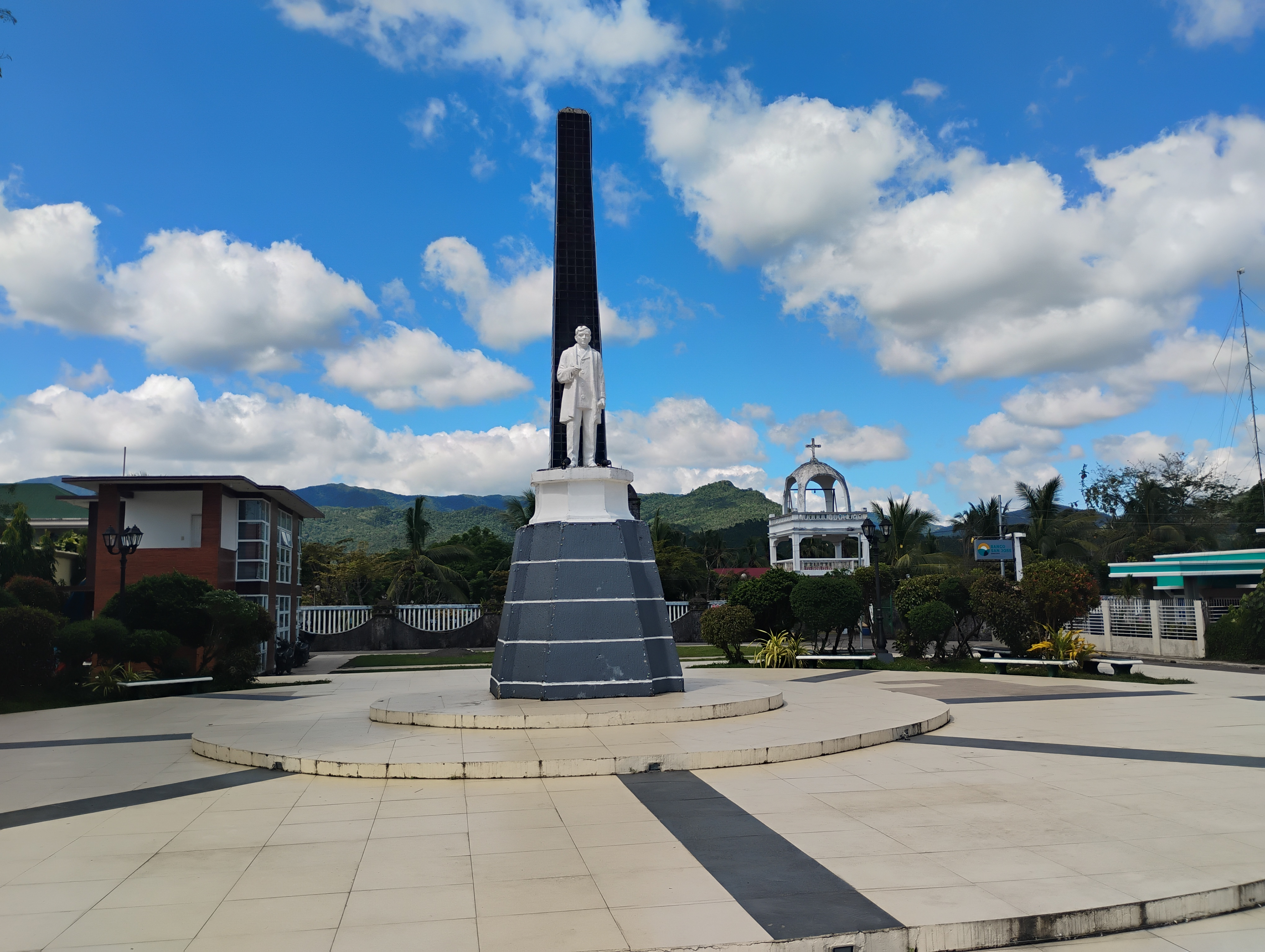
- Lagonoy Old Bell Tower Lagonoy Town Proper Lagonoy Municipal Hall Saint Philip and James Parish Church Lagonoy Town Plaza

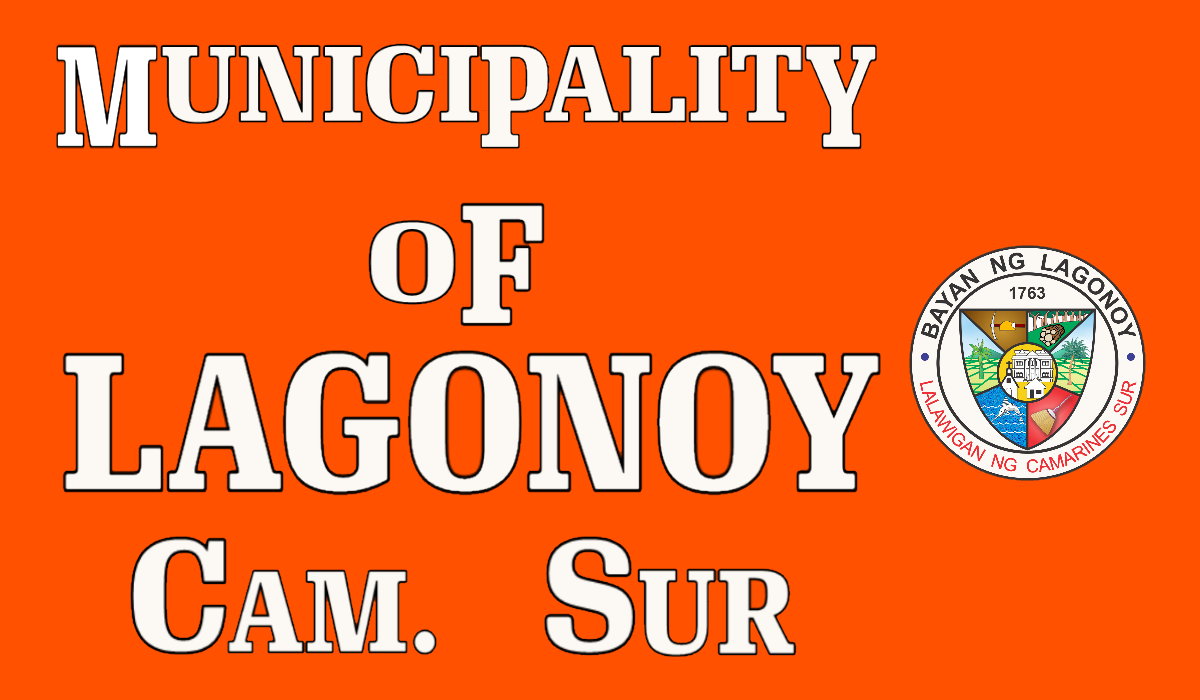
- Flag
- Nickname: The True Heart of Partido
- Motto: Dagos Ang Pag-asenso
- Map of Camarines Sur with Lagonoy highlighted
- Interactive map of Lagonoy
- Location within the Philippines
- Coordinates: 13°44′07″N 123°31′15″E
- Country: Philippines
- Region: Bicol Region
- Province: Camarines Sur
- District: 4th district
- Founded: 1763
- Barangays: 38 (see Barangays)

Government
  - Type: Sangguniang Bayan
  - Mayor: Dyego Luiz H. Pilapil
  - Vice Mayor: Jerry Jake R. Remoto
  - Representative: Arnulf Bryan B. Fuentebella
  - Municipal Council: Members: Evangeline A. Martizano; Jorge Bejamen R. Favenir; Frederick P. Abante; Emily M. Fante; James Paolo P. Peteza; Mercy R. Saboco; Marites A. Piano; Serafin R. Pesimo Jr.
  - Electorate: 41,019 voters (2025)

Area
  - Total: 377.90 km^{2} (145.91 sq mi)
- Elevation: 12.8 m (42 ft)
- Highest elevation: 473 m (1,552 ft)
- Lowest elevation: 0 m (0 ft)

Population (2024 census)
  - Total: 57,044
  - Density: 150.95/km^{2} (390.96/sq mi)
  - Households: 12,225

Economy
  - Income class: 1st municipal income class
  - Poverty incidence: 33.63% (2023)
  - Revenue: ₱ 284.3 million (2024)
  - Assets: ₱ 637.9 million (2024)
  - Expenditure: ₱ 289.4 million (2024)
  - Liabilities: ₱ 163.4 million (2024)

Service provider
  - Electricity: Camarines Sur 4 Electric Cooperative (CASURECO 4)
- Time zone: UTC+8 (PST)
- ZIP code: 4425
- PSGC: 0501717000
- IDD : area code: +63 (0)54
- Native languages: Central Bikol; Tagalog

Lagonoy, officially the Municipality of Lagonoy (Central Bikol: Banwaan kan Lagonoy; Tagalog: Bayan ng Lagonoy), is a municipality in the province of Camarines Sur, Philippines. According to the 2024 census, it has a population of 57,044 people.

== Etymology ==
There are two version as how Lagonoy got its name. Year 1734 when the first Spaniards in this place found a small forested area near a creek where "hagonoy", a medicinal plant grew abundantly. Because the Spaniards could hardly pronounce the word "hagonoy" with the "j" sound, with "ha" of the first syllable, they deliberately decided to change "ha" to "la". Since then, the place was known as "Lagonoy". Some of the residents also believed that the name was taken from the word "lango" meaning drunk. During fiestas and other forms or merry making, men used to drink too much "tuba" (native wine) that they become drunk or "lango" (Bikol for drunk) so that the place was called by the neighboring towns as "Lagonoy".

== History ==
In 1734, Partido towns of Caramoan, Lagonoy, Goa and Tigaon belonged to Albay. It was only in 1846 did Lagonoy belong to Camarines Sur. In a long research by Norman Owen, a feud between Lagonoy Parish and Franciscan Mission of Goa and Tigaon existed. In 1580, the administration by the Franciscans of Lagonoy Parish began until 1636, which was passed to the “mitre” of the bishop of Nueva Caceres. In 1580 to 1850, Lagonoy gulf had been very famous because of the constant moro raids in the Partido area and all coastal towns of Albay and Catanduanes. On the other hand, Lagonoy had other problems about the Remontados of Mt Isarog. F. Mallari, in his book- “Ibalon under siege and storm” said they were fallen Christians and confirmed by Fray Manuel Crespo, who spent many years inducing them to return to the town and live peacefully. Fray Matias de Valdesoto also noted in his visits to the sitios of Goa and Lagonoy that the natives planted corn, rice, root crops & tobacco. The 1818 census showed 1669 native families paying tribute and they were coexisting with 18 Spanish-Filipino families.

== Geography ==
=== Barangays ===
Lagonoy is politically subdivided into 38 barangays. Each barangay consists of puroks and some have sitios.

- Agosais
- Agpo-Camagong-Tabog
- Amoguis
- Bocogan
- Balaton
- Binanuahan
- Burabod
- Cabotonan
- Dahat
- Del Carmen
- Genorangan
- Gimagtocon
- Gubat
- Guibahoy
- Himanag
- Kinahologan
- Loho
- Manamoc
- Mangogon
- Mapid
- Olas
- Omalo
- Panagan
- Panicuan
- Pinamihagan
- San Francisco (Poblacion)
- San Isidro
- San Isidro Sur (Poblacion)
- San Isidro Norte (Poblacion)
- San Rafael
- San Ramon
- San Roque
- San Sebastian
- San Vicente (Poblacion)
- Santa Cruz
- Santa Maria (Poblacion)
- Saripongpong (Poblacion)
- Sipaco

=== Climate ===
Climate data for Lagonoy, Camarines Sur
Month	Jan	Feb	Mar	Apr	May	Jun	Jul	Aug	Sep	Oct	Nov	Dec	Year
Mean daily maximum °C (°F)	31 (88)	30 (86)	32 (90)	35 (95)	35 (95)	35 (95)	34 (93)	33 (91)	34 (93)	32 (90)	30 (86)	30 (86)	33 (91)
Mean daily minimum °C (°F)	26 (79)	26 (79)	28 (82)	30 (86)	31 (88)	30 (86)	29 (84)	29 (84)	29 (84)	28 (82)	27 (81)	27 (81)	28 (83)
Average precipitation mm (inches)	82.88 (3.26)	137.93 (5.43)	63.69 (2.51)	78.31 (3.08)	229.42 (9.03)	288.31 (11.35)	280.99 (11.06)	112.39 (4.42)	210.87 (8.30)	599.07 (23.59)	194.80 (7.67)	454.3 (17.89)	2,732.96 (107.59)
Average rainy days	24	28	18	20	24	29	31	27	27	30	29	31	318
Source: World Weather Online

== Demographics ==
Population census of Lagonoy
Year	Pop.	±% p.a.
1903	9,725	—
1918	12,681	+1.79%
1939	18,852	+1.91%
1948	22,604	+2.04%
1960	31,525	+2.81%
1970	29,178	−0.77%
1975	33,297	+2.68%
1980	34,717	+0.84%
1990	38,163	+0.95%
1995	40,126	+0.94%
2000	42,636	+1.31%
2007	46,093	+1.08%
2010	51,814	+4.35%
2015	55,465	+1.31%
2020	56,714	+0.47%
2024	57,044	+0.14%
Source: Philippine Statistics Authority

In the 2024 census, the population of Lagonoy was 57,044 people, with a density of 150 inhabitants per square kilometre or 390 inhabitants per square mile.

== Economy ==
Poverty incidence of Lagonoy

Source: Philippine Statistics Authority

Lagonoy is the chief supplier of "tiger grass" to the prominent soft broom "walis tambo makers" of North Luzon and some parts of Central Luzon.

== Education ==
There are two schools district offices which govern all educational institutions within the municipality. They oversee the management and operations of all private and public, from primary to secondary schools. These are the:

- Lagonoy North Schools District
- Lagonoy South Schools District

=== Primary and elementary schools ===
- Agosais Community School
- Amoguis Community School
- Arborvitae Plains Montessori
- Binanuahan Elementary School
- Bocogan Elementary School
- Bolo Elementary School
- Burabod Elementary School
- Cabotonan Elementary School
- Dahat Elementary School
- Del Carmen Elementary School
- Glorious Adonai Learning Academy
- Guibahoy Elementary School
- Gubat Central School
- Himagtocon Elementary School
- Himanag Elementary School
- Himagtocon SDA Multigrade School
- Kinahulogan Central School
- Lagonoy North Central School
- Lagonoy South Central School
- Loho Elementary School
- Manamoc Elementary School
- Mangogon Elementary School
- Mapid Elementary School
- Marian Formation Center
- Olas Elementary School
- Paghaluban Community School
- Pagsimbugan Elementary School
- Panagan Elementary School
- Panicuan Primary School
- Pinamihagan Elementary School
- San Isidro Elementary School
- San Rafael-Agpo Elementary School
- San Ramon Elementary School
- San Roque Elementary School
- San Sebastian Elementary School
- Sipaco Elementary School
- St. John and St. Paul Parochial School
- St. Philip And St. James Parochial School
- Sta. Cruz Elementary School

=== Secondary schools ===
- Balaton National High School
- Bicol Central Academy
- Cabotonan High School
- Dahat Vocational National High School
- Himanag National High School
- Lagonoy High School
- Panagan National High School
- San Ramon Pilot National High School
- San Sebastian Fisheries High School
- Sipaco National High School

== Gallery ==
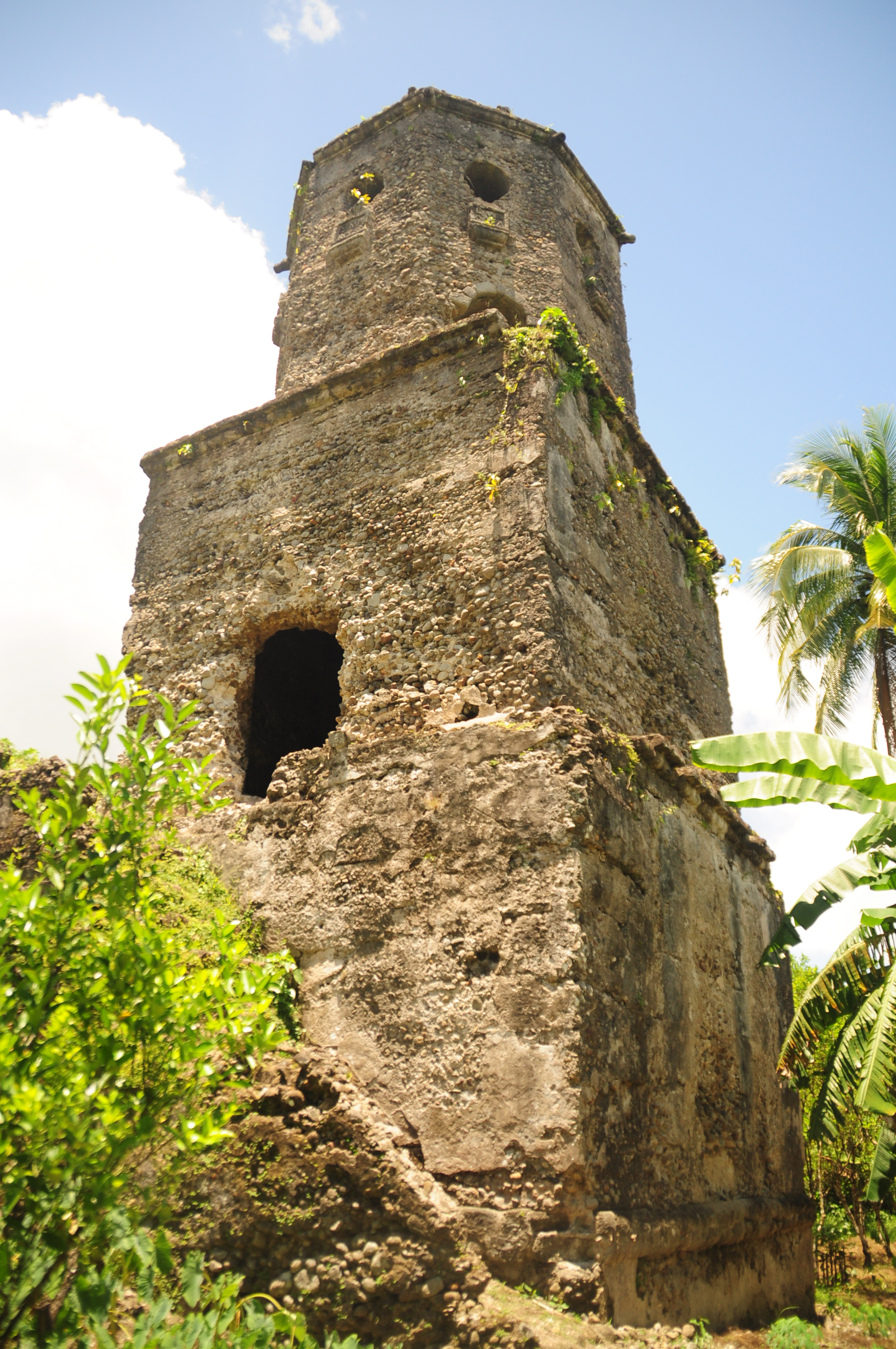
Remaining belfry of old Lagonoy Church

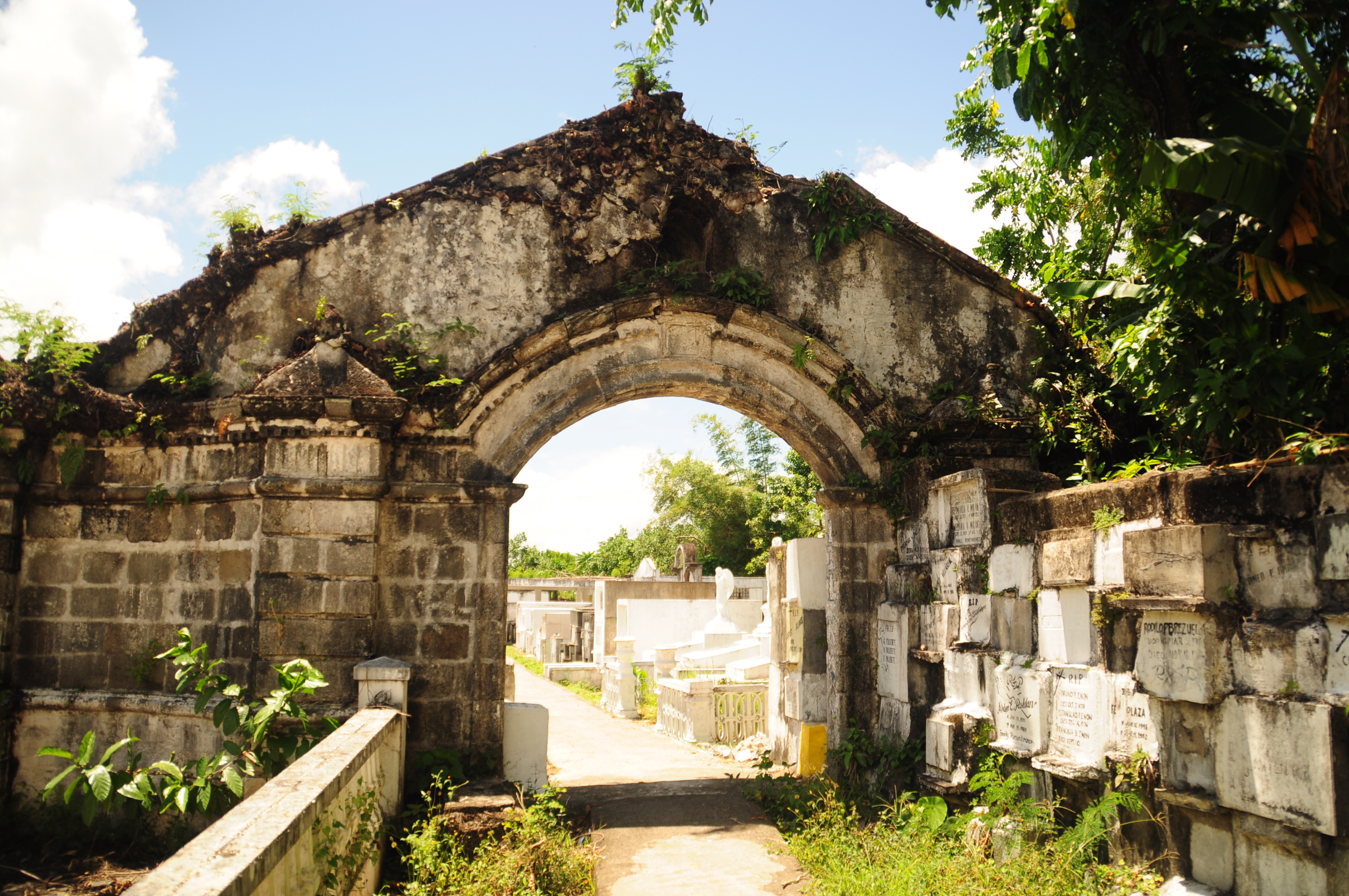
Portal to the Old Cemetery of Lagonoy

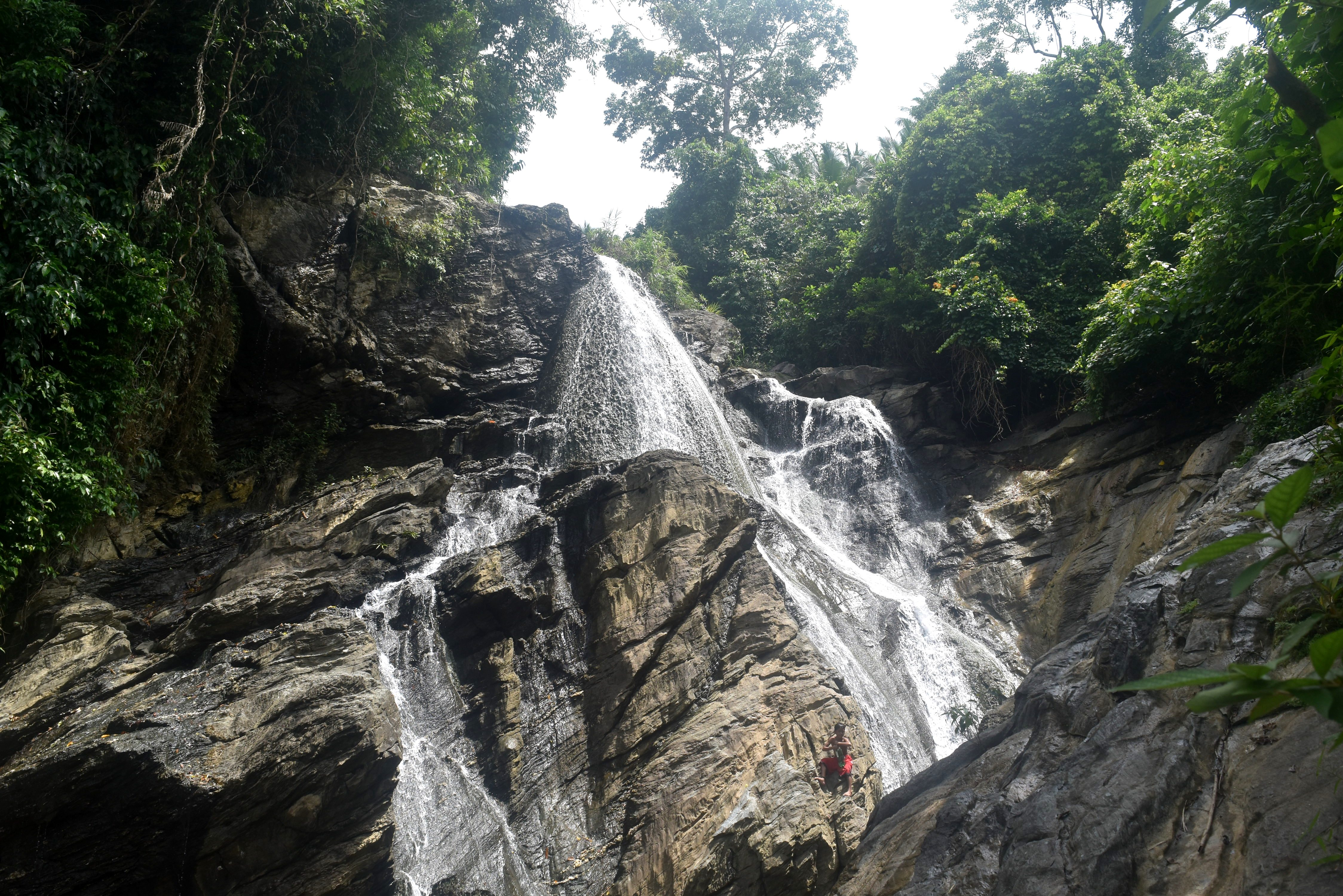
Kinahulogan Falls

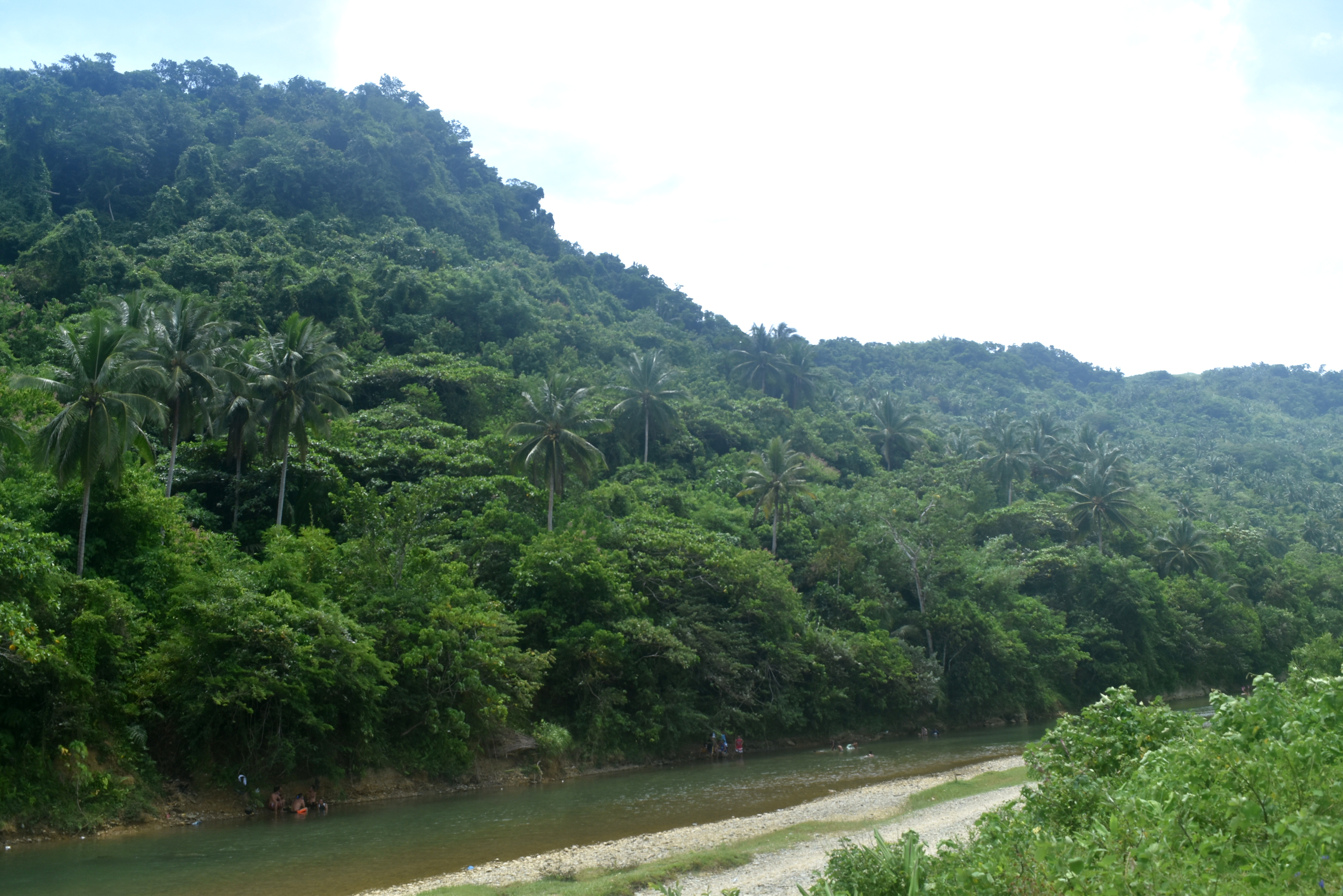
Caguiscan River

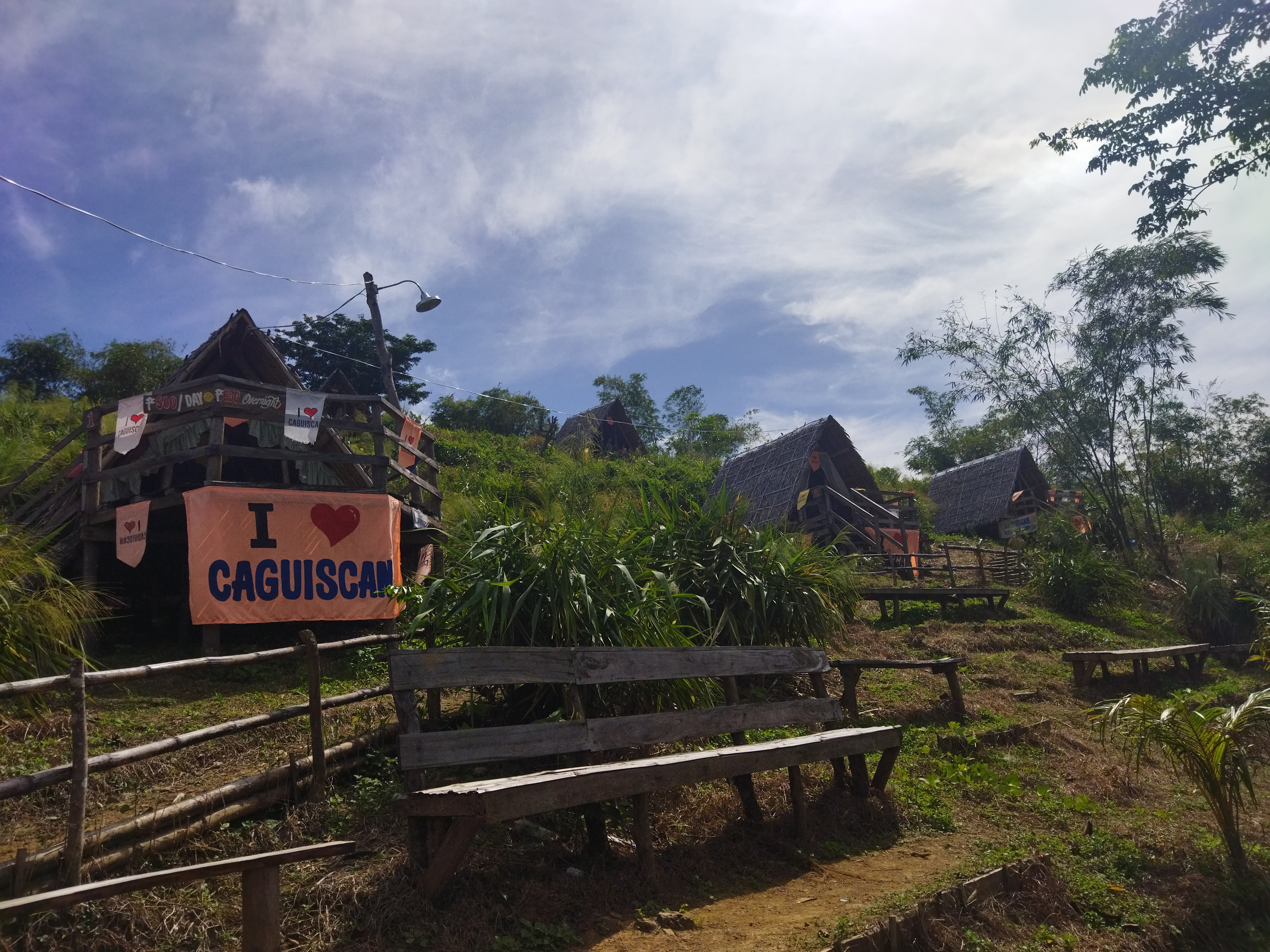
Caguiscan Picnic Grove and Campsite

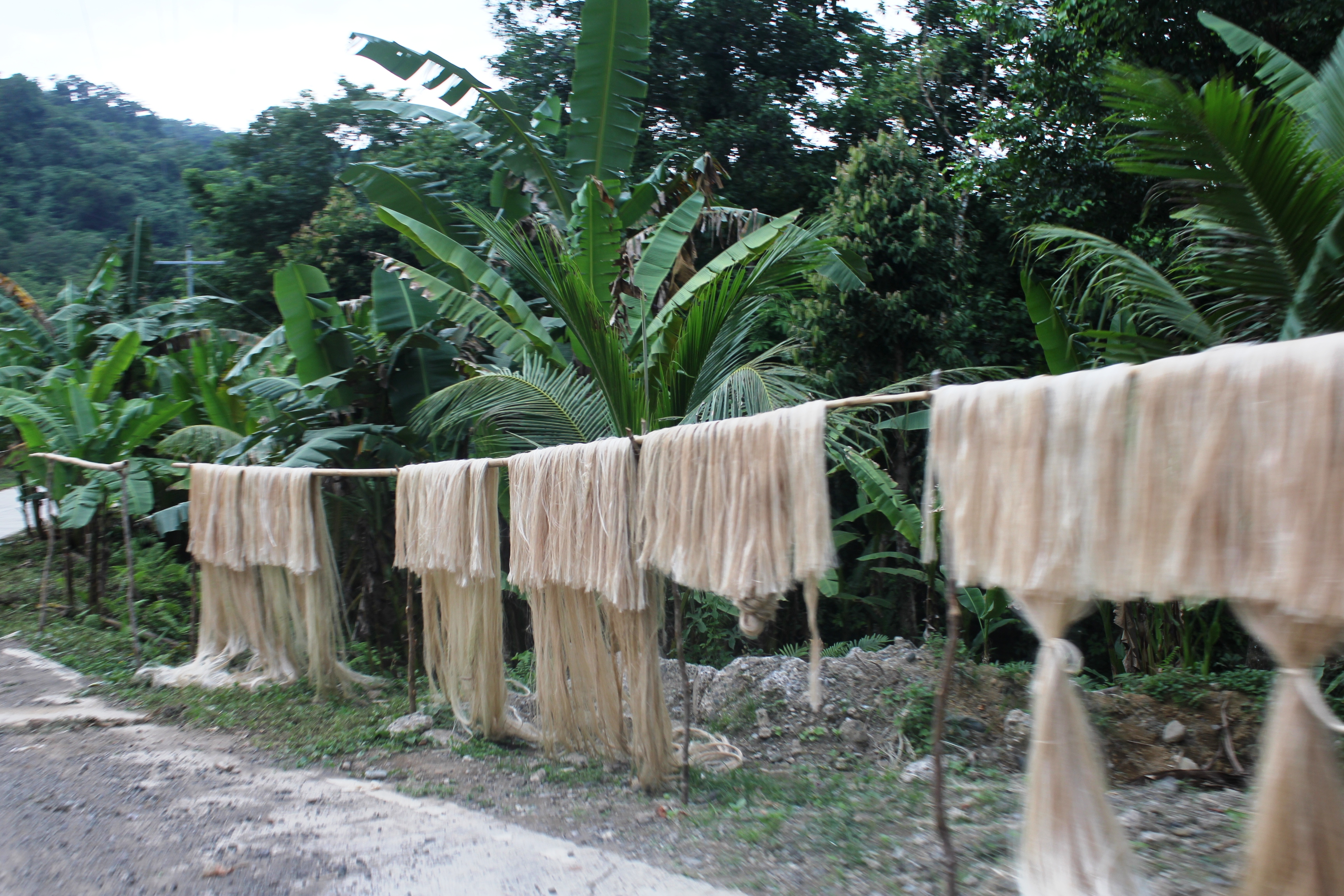
Abaca fibers produced in Lagonoy
