= Tambangan =

- District
- Interactive map of Tambangan
- Coordinates: 0°43′45.1236″N 99°37′28.7076″E
- Country: Indonesia
- Province: North Sumatra
- Regency: Madina Regency

Area
  - Total: 158.60 km^{2} (61.24 sq mi)

Population (2023)
  - Total: 10,913
  - Density: 68.808/km^{2} (178.21/sq mi)
- Time zone: UTC+7 (IST)
- Postal code: 22996

Tambangan is an district (kecamatan) in Madina Regency, North Sumatra Province, Indonesia.
