= University of Northeastern Philippines =

Private university in Camarines Sur, Philippines

- Pamantasan ng Hilagang Silangan ng Pilipinas (Filipino); Unibersidad kan Norte-Esteng Pilipinas
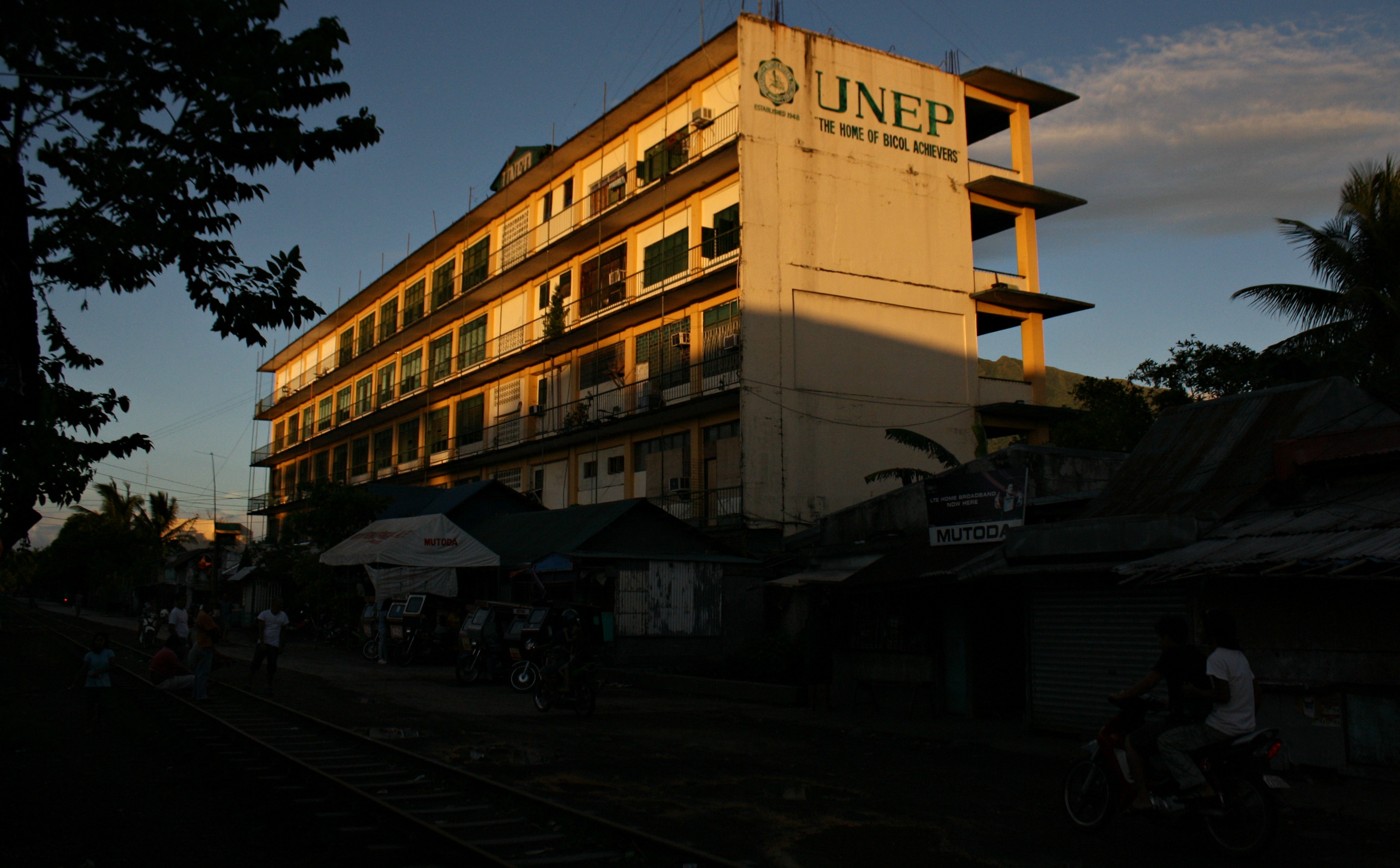
- Former names: Mabini Memorial School, Mabini College
- Motto: Lux scientia potentia
- Motto in English: Home of Global Achievers
- Established: 1948
- Founders: Felix Sr & Remedios Alfelor
- Affiliations: PACUCOA PRISAA
- Religious affiliation: Nonsectarian
- President: Atty. Remelisa G. Alfelor - Moraleda
- Location: Iriga City, Camarines Sur; 13°25′18.8″N 123°24′36.8″E
- Colours: Green White Yellow
- Mascot: Golden Bears
- Website: inet.unep.edu.ph
- Location in Luzon Location in the Philippines

The University of Northeastern Philippines (UNEP) is a private non-sectarian university located in Iriga, Camarines Sur in Bicol, Philippines.

== History ==
The University of Northeastern Philippines was established in 1948, in the then Municipality of Iriga. It was founded by a young couple named Atty.Felix Ordas- Alfelor Sr. and Dr. Remedios Rigoroso Alfelor as a small school and was first located in a rented property in the town center. Mabini Memorial School, as it was named in the beginning, offered complete high school and degree courses in Education and Liberal Arts.

The school, in a few years, outgrew its space located downtown. The school then bought 17 hectares of land, a former dumpsite, near the town center. It then transferred into the new site and developed the campus, completing it in the early 1960s. It then was renamed Mabini College. Additional degrees were offered and school population even grew more rapidly with the diversified campus offerings.

In 1974, the school received its university charter and was finally named the University of Northeastern Philippines. Four years later, the College of Law opened. It is the only law school in Iriga. Through the years the university continuously opened various programs. UNEP is considered one of the oldest universities in the Bicol Region, and one of the two prestigious universities in the city.

== Secondary and Elementary School ==
- Junior and Senior High School
- Night High School class
- Grade School

== College Undergraduate Programs ==
=== College of Law ===
- Bachelor of Law

=== College of Education || PACUCOA Level II Accredited ===
- Bachelor of Secondary Education (BSE)

Major in:

1. English
2. Mathematics
3. MAPEH
4. Values Education
5. Filipino
6. Social Studies
7. TLE
8. Physical Education
- Bachelor of Elementary Education (BEED)

=== College of Business Education || PACUCOA Level II Accredited ===
- Bachelor of Science in Commerce

Major in :

1. Computer Management
- Bachelor of Science in Business Education

Major in:

1. Financial Management
2. Operation Management
3. Marketing Management
4. Human Resource Management
5. Management
- Bachelor of Science in Accountancy
- Bachelor of Science in Customs Administration
- Bachelor of Science in Office Administration
- Bachelor of Science in Entrepreneurship
- Bachelor of Science in Accounting Technology

=== College of Hotel and Restaurant Management ===
- Bachelor of Science in Hotel and Restaurant Management
- Bachelor of Science in Tourism
- Bachelor of Science in Travel Management

=== College of Arts and Sciences || PACUCOA Level II Accredited ===
- Bachelor of Science in Social Work
- Bachelor of Arts in Communication
- Bachelor of Arts in English Language
- Bachelor of Arts in Political Science

=== College of Engineering and Architecture ===
- Bachelor of Science in Electrical Engineering
- Bachelor of Science in Civil Engineering
- Bachelor of Science in Geodetic Engineering
- Bachelor of Science in Electronics and Communication Engineering
- Bachelor of Science in Mechanical Engineering
- Bachelor of Science in Architecture

=== College of Maritime Education ===
- Bachelor of Science Marine Engineering
- Bachelor of Science in Marine Transportation

=== College of Criminal Justice Education ===
- Bachelor of Science in Criminology

=== College of Nursing ===
- Bachelor of Science in Nursing
- Two (2) years Diploma in Midwifery

== Graduate school ==
=== Masteral Program ===
- Master of Arts in Education (MAEd)

Major in:

1. Filipino
2. Science
3. English
4. Early Childhood Education
5. Guidance and Counselling
6. Elementary Education
7. Administration and Supervision
8. Mathematics
- Master in Business Administration (MBA)
- Master of Public Administration (MPA)

=== Doctoral Program ===
- Doctor of Philosophy (Ph.D)

Major in:

1. Human Resource Development
- Doctor of Public Management (DPM)
- Doctor of Business Management (DBM)
- Doctor of Education (Ed.D.)

Major in

1. Educational Management

== Scholarship Program ==
=== School-Sponsored Scholarship Program ===
1. Presidential Scholarship Grant
2. Felix O. Alfelor Sr. Scholarship Grant
3. Dr. Remedios R. Alfelor Scholarship Grant
4. Administrative Scholarship Grant
5. Honor High School Graduates Grant
6. UNEP Center for Culture and Arts
7. Athletic Scholarship Grant

=== Government Scholarship ===
1. Madelaine Alfelor-Gazmen (MAGS)
2. TESDA Scholarship Grant
3. CHED Scholarship Grant
4. Education Service Contracting (ESC)
5. Ako Bicol Partylist Scholarship Grant
6. A Teacher Partylist Scholarship Grant

=== Private Scholarship ===
1. College of Nursing International Alumni Association Scholarship Grant
2. Doña Gregoria B. Albia Scholarship Grant
3. Arch. Jose T. Emila Jr. Scholarship Grant
4. Magbinaydan Scholarship Grant
5. Sor Maria Asuncion G. Evidente, DC Scholarship Grant
6. Philippine Veterans Scholarship (PVAO)

== Accreditation ==
Several programs of UNEP have been accredited by the Philippine Association of Colleges and Universities Commission on Accreditation (PACUCOA). Examples of these are the undergraduate programs in the liberal arts, business administration, elementary and secondary education which have all been Level II-accredited. Meanwhile, graduate programs in education, business administration and public administration have all been accredited under Level I.

== Sister schools ==
- Felix O. Alfelor Sr. Foundation College
- Alfelor Sr. Memorial College
- Buhi Lyceum
- Partido College
