= Iriga =

Component city in Camarines Sur, Philippines

- Component city
- City of Iriga
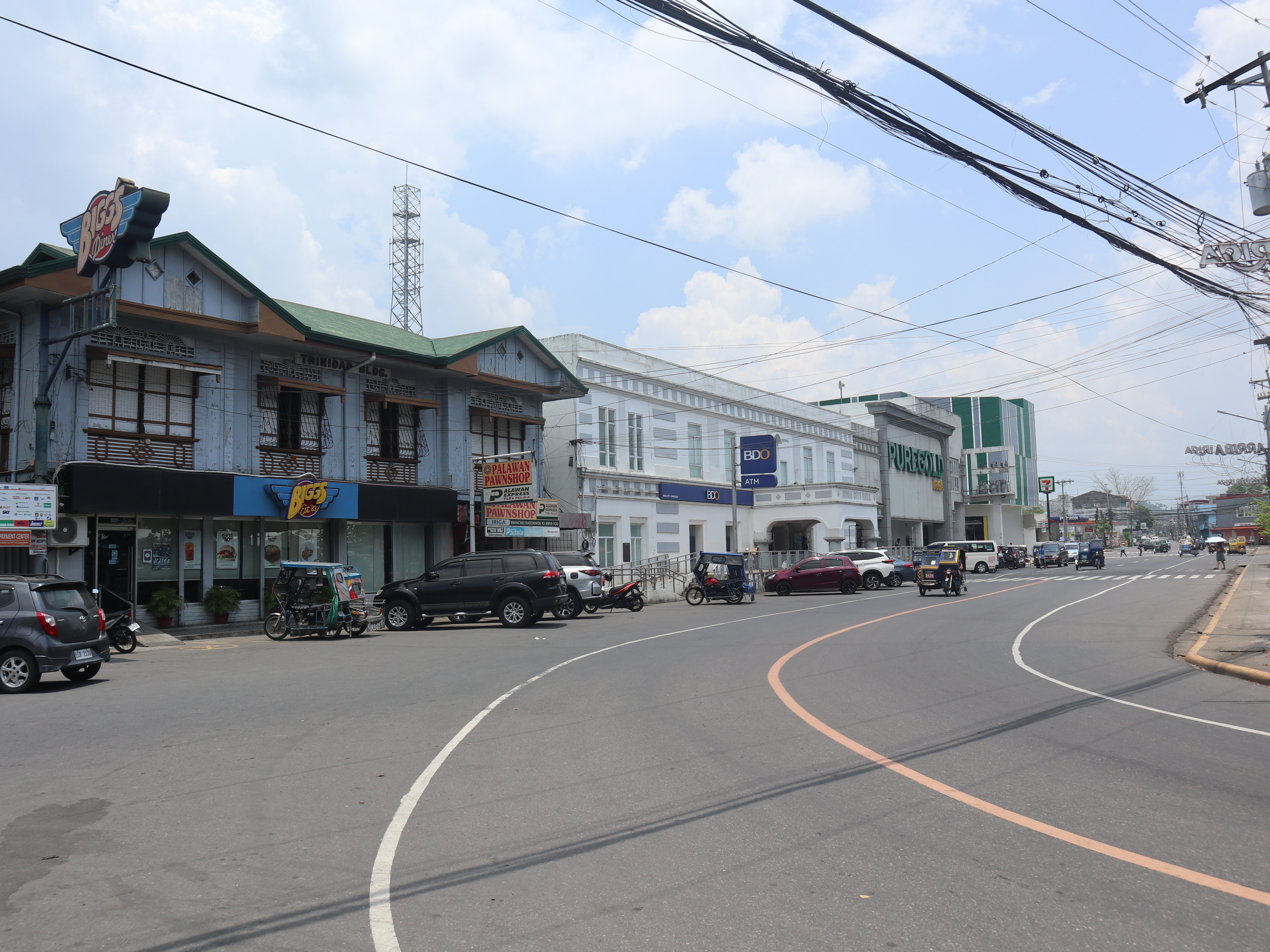
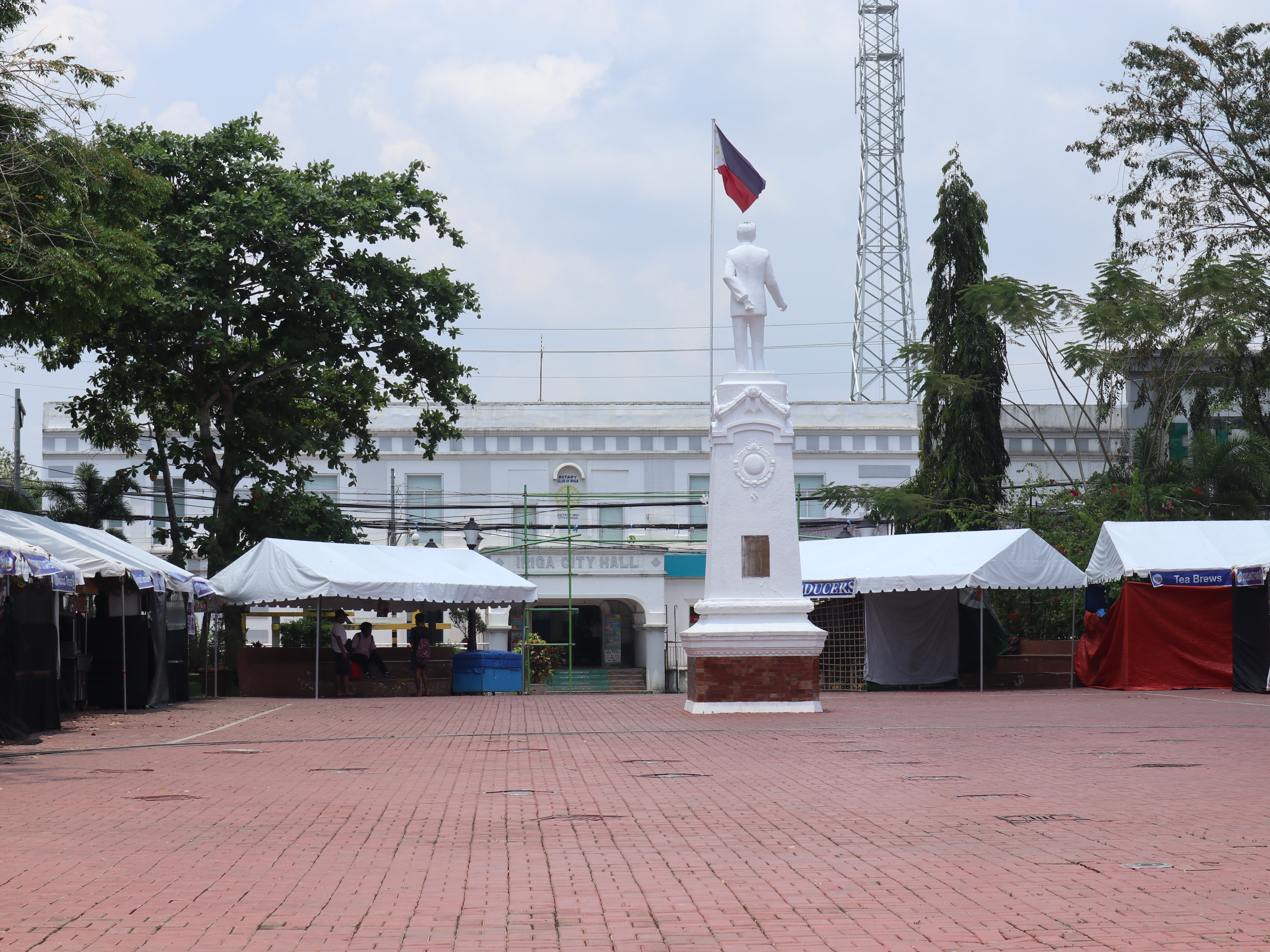
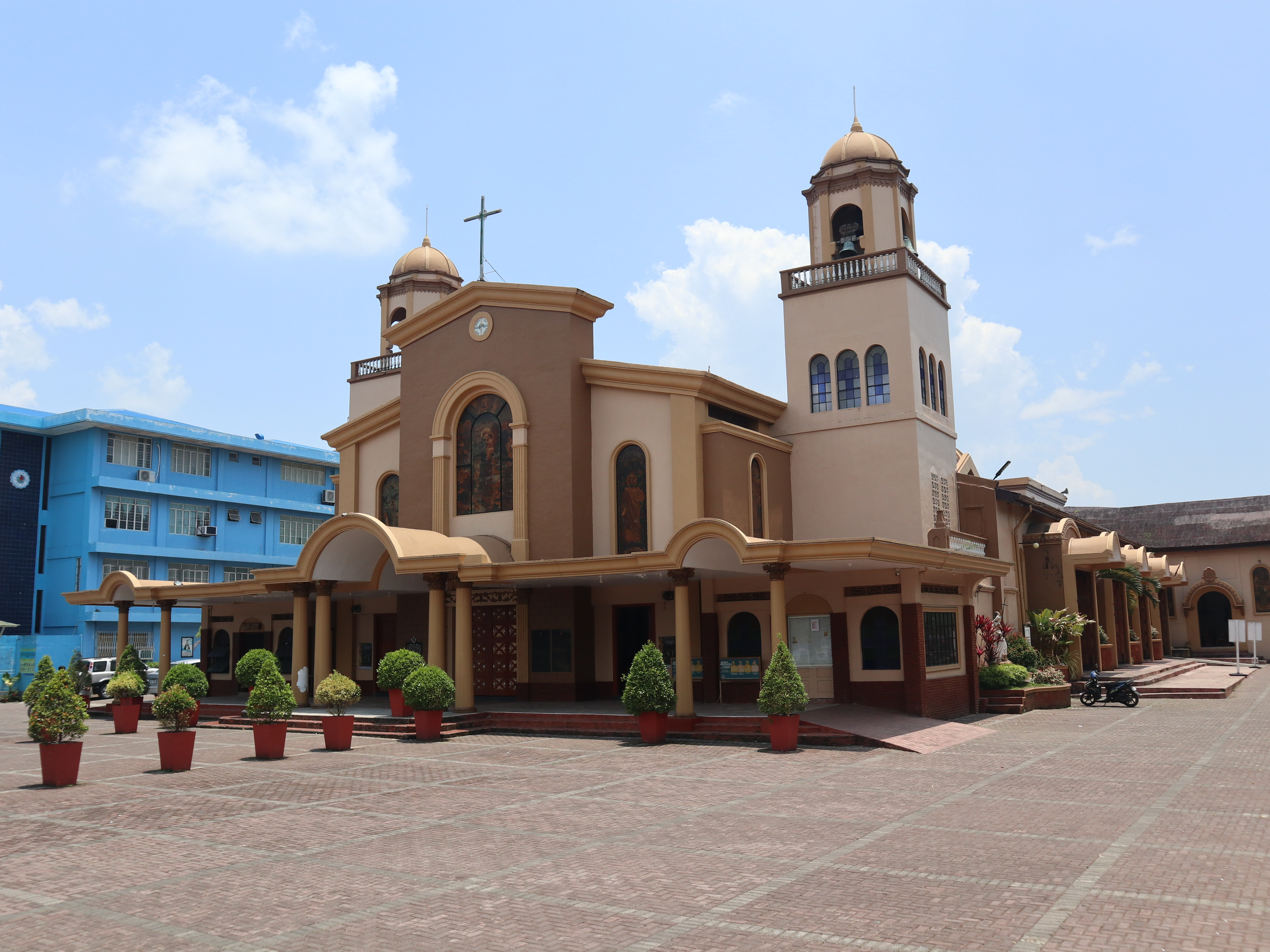
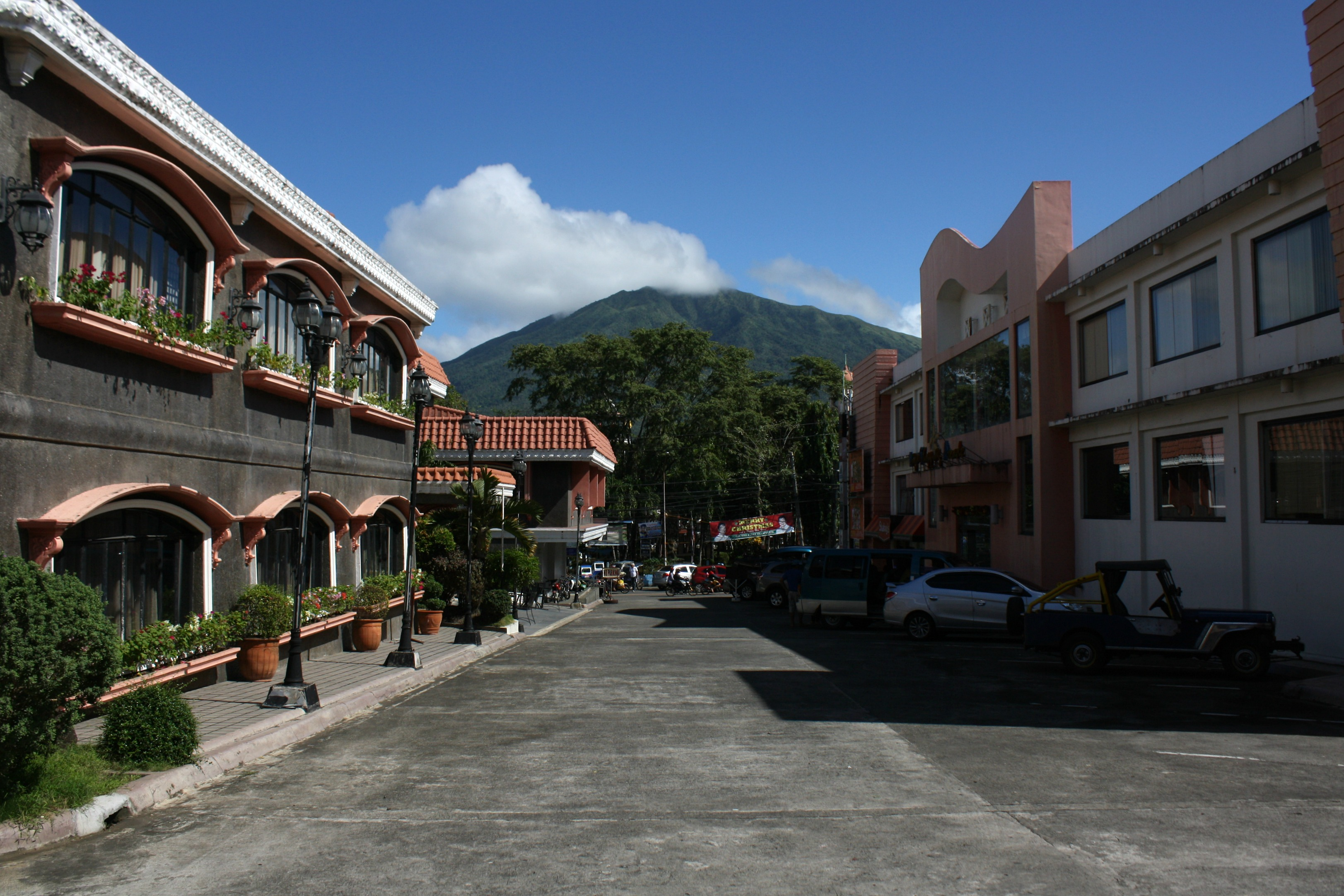
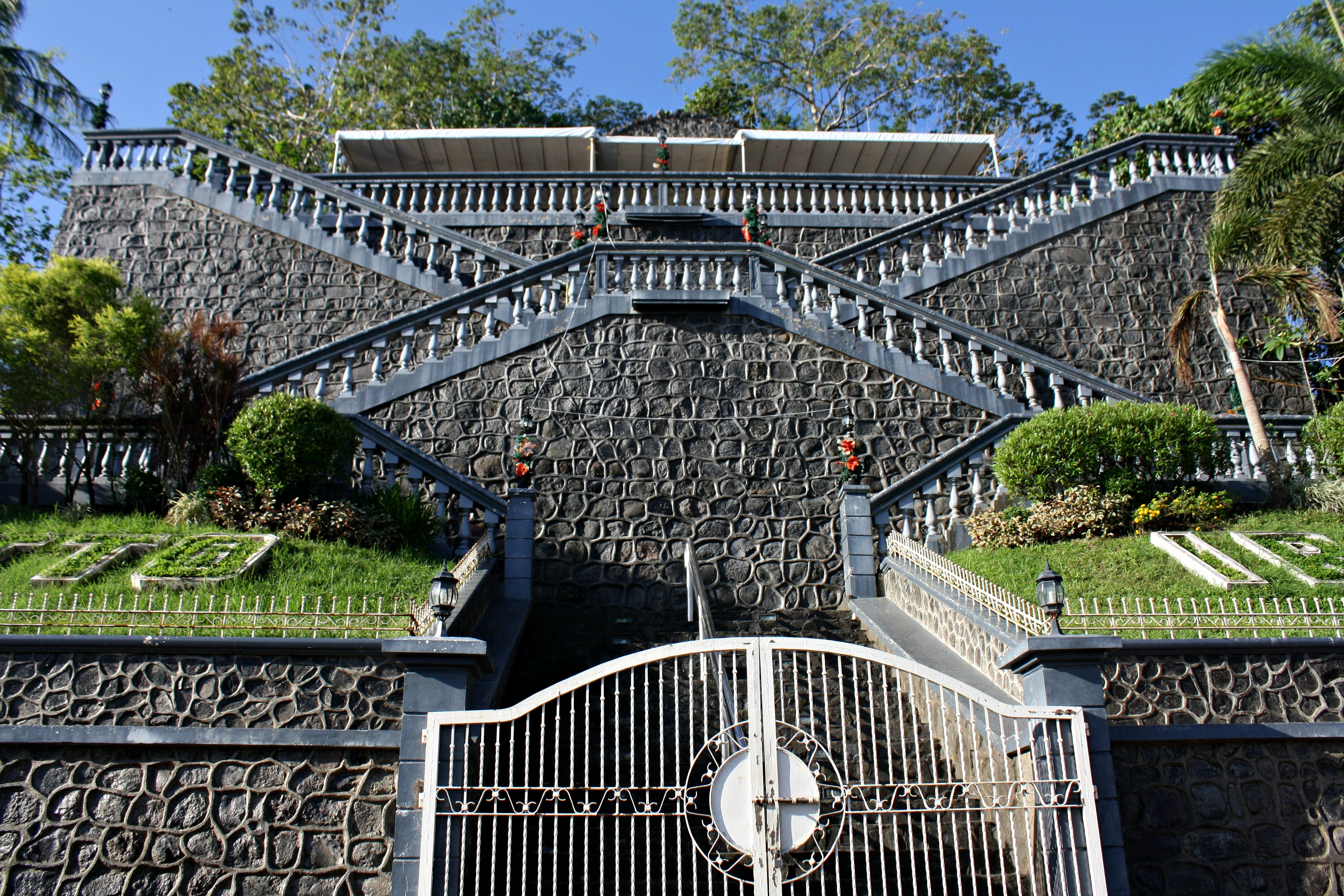
- From top, left to right: Iriga city proper • Iriga Plaza Rizal • San Antonio de Padua Church • Iriga Plaza Hotel with Mount Asog in the background • Our Lady of Lourdes Grotto

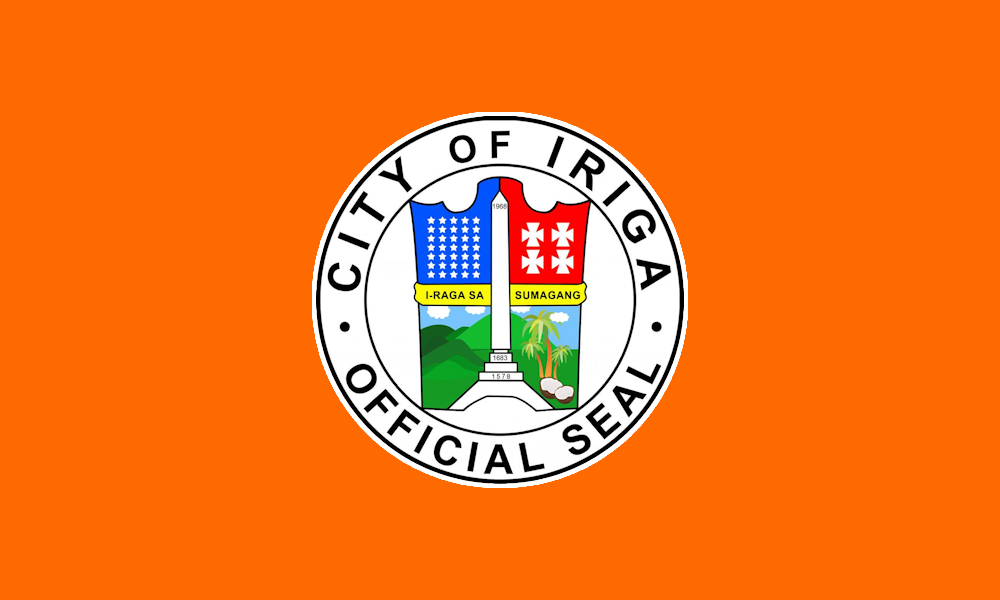
- Flag Seal
- Nickname: City of Crystal Clear Springs
- Map of Camarines Sur with Iriga highlighted
- Interactive map of Iriga
- Location within the Philippines
- Coordinates: 13°25′23″N 123°24′44″E
- Country: Philippines
- Region: Bicol Region
- Province: Camarines Sur
- District: 5th district
- Founded: 1578 (as a visita)
- Founded: 1683 (as a pueblo)
- Cityhood: September 3, 1968
- Barangays: 36 (see Barangays)

Government
  - Type: Sangguniang Panlungsod
  - Mayor: Wilfred Rex C. Oliva
  - Vice Mayor: Edsel S. Dimaiwat
  - Representative: Miguel Luis R. Villafuerte
  - City Council: Members: Angelica Paula P. Vargas; Santos A. Audal Jr.; Melnan R. Murallo; Katherine Dominique C. Lagrimas; Jose S. Villanueva Jr.; Dandreb N. Abonite; Jessie D. Abonite Jr.; Rodolfo Jeff B. Tino; Jm A. Grimaldo; Wilfranco E. Guevara
  - Electorate: 76,836 voters (2025)

Area
  - Total: 137.35 km^{2} (53.03 sq mi)
- Elevation: 129 m (423 ft)
- Highest elevation: 1,409 m (4,623 ft)
- Lowest elevation: 0 m (0 ft)

Population (2024 census)
  - Total: 115,306
  - Density: 839.50/km^{2} (2,174.3/sq mi)
  - Households: 25,276
- Demonym: Irigueño (neuter) Irigueña (female)

Economy
  - Income class: 3rd city income class
  - Poverty incidence: 16.85% (2023)
  - Revenue: ₱ 935.3 million (2024)
  - Assets: ₱ 2,084 million (2024)
  - Expenditure: ₱ 722.8 million (2024)
  - Liabilities: ₱ 778.2 million (2024)

Service provider
  - Electricity: Camarines Sur 3 Electric Cooperative (CASURECO 3)
- Time zone: UTC+8 (PST)
- ZIP code: 4431
- PSGC: 051716000
- IDD : area code: +63 (0)54
- Native languages: Rinconada Bikol; Central Bikol; Tagalog
- Website: www.iriga.gov.ph

Iriga, officially the City of Iriga (Rinconada Bikol: Syudad ka Iriga; Central Bikol: Syudad nin Iriga; Filipino: Lungsod ng Iriga), is a component city in the province of Camarines Sur, Philippines. According to the 2024 census, it has a population of 115,306 people.

== History ==
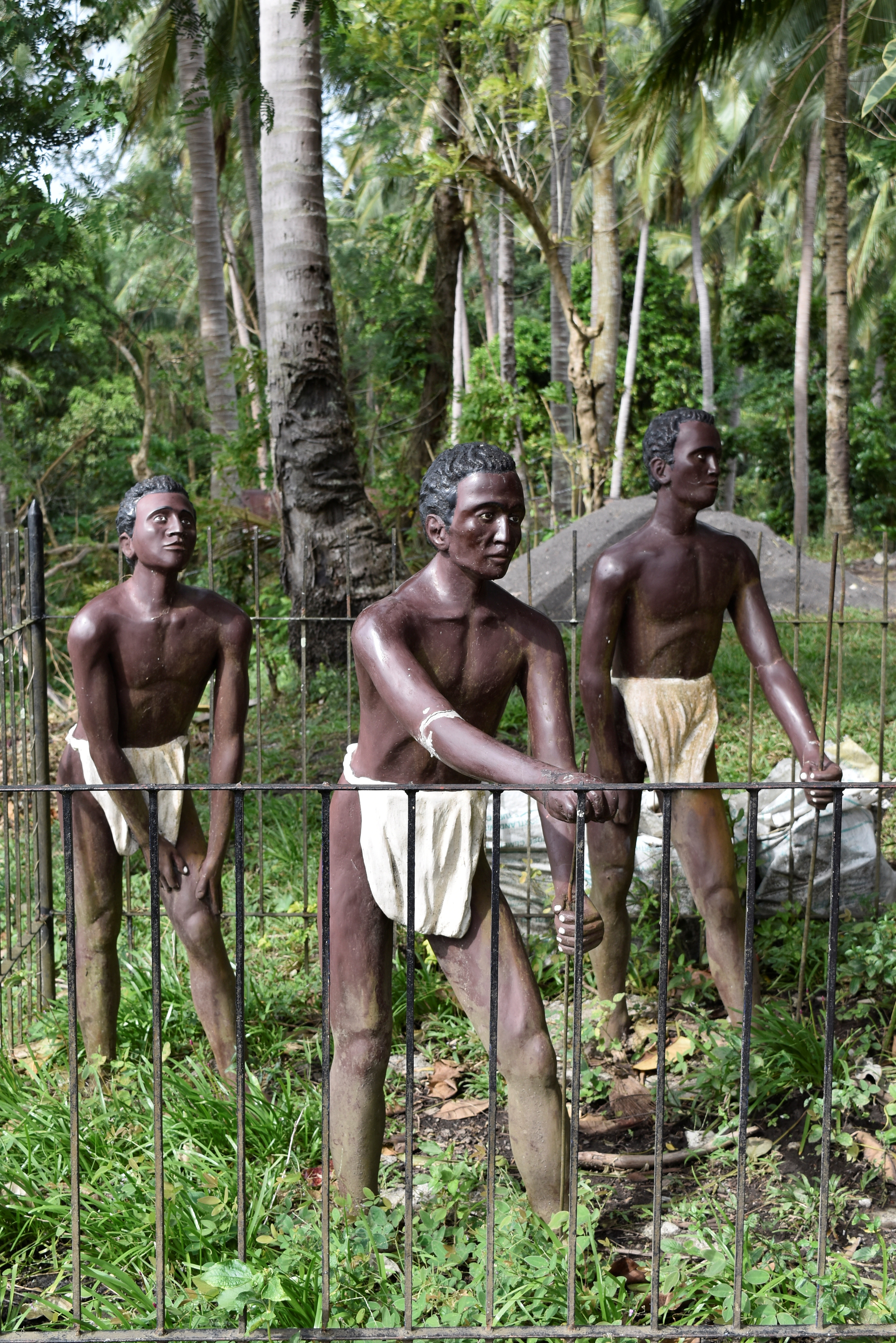
Agta Monument in Inorogan

Barely half a century after Ferdinand Magellan set foot in the Philippines on March 16, 1521, Iriga, now a city, was only a visita of Nabua, Provincia de Ambos Camarines. Because of the disastrous floods that occur during rainy seasons in suburban Poblacion of Nabua, Father Felix de Huertas, the then parish priest, advised the farmers to move to I-raga (donde hay tierra or where there is land) where they can plant their crops without fear of being under flooded. The flood victims of Nabua who moved earlier and followed the suggestions of their parish priest were the fortunate beneficiaries of the harvest of their agricultural plantation coming from the rich and fertile soils of I-raga, more so, those who planted at the foot of Sumagang Mountain (Mountain of the Rising Sun, now Mt. Iriga) said to be nature's given symbol of the Irigueños lofty ideals and noble visions.

As population spread out and evangelization progressed, the settlement at the foot of Sumagang Mountain developed in size and wealth, slowly pushing the Indigenous Agta communities up to the thickness of the forest. And in 1578 the I-raga settlement was established as "visita" of Nabua under Fray Pablo de Jesus and Fray Bartolome Ruiz, both Franciscans. Three decades later or on January 4, 1641, Mount Asog (named after an Indigenous Negrito chieftain) or Mt. Iriga, erupted. That eruption brought much fear to the settlers but with their strong faith and belief a miracle happened and as witnessed by local folks, the apparition of the Blessed Virgin Mother and her son Lord Jesus or "Nuestra Señora de Angustia" at sitio Inorogan saved the people from terrible earthquake and flood. The eruption formed the cavernous gully on the side of Buhi leading to the steep gorge which was the crater of the "volcano".

Iriga, according to Fray Felix Huertas in his lengthily titled Estado Geografico, Topografico, Estadisticdo, Historico-Reliogoso de la Santa Apostolica Provincia de S. Gregorio Magno published in 1865, came from the native word iraga, which means "poseedores de mucho terreno", or "possessors of much land". From a mere "doctrina", a religious administrative word which roughly means a "mission post" in 1583. In 1683, this progressive visita of I-raga was converted into Pueblo de la Provincia de Ambos Camarines with a population of 8,908 which several decades later the name I-raga was changed to Iriga by the Spanish authorities and advocated St. Anthony of Padua as Patron Saint and June 13 as the annual fiesta.

From the mid-19th century through the early decades of the 20th century, Iriga was a major producer of abaca in the Bicol region. This was largely due to the fertile volcanic soil surrounding Mt. Iriga, formed from an eruption estimated to have occurred about six hundred years before the arrival of the Spaniards in the region. According to William Freer, the American Superintendent of Schools in Camarines Sur, the mountain’s slopes supported extensive abaca plantations owned by several Spaniards and were inhabited by Negrito communities who worked in these plantations. Owing to its strong abaca industry, Iriga ranked third in importance in Camarines at the time, surpassed only by Nueva Caceres and Daet.

During the incumbency of Don Martin Mendoza as Capitan Municipal, in the memorias de la Provincia de Ambos Camarines, showed that the “Pueblo de Iriga” was composed of “barrios y visitas distinguida la poblacion centro del casco en 5 barrios que son San Roque, San Francisco de Asis, San Juan Bautista, Santo Domingo de Guzman y San Miguel Arcangel con 6 visitas fuera del casco denominados San Nicolas de Tolentino, San Agustin, San Antonio Abad, Santo Niño, Santiago de Galicia y la visita de los monteses” with a population of 13,813. There were only four roads mentioned, they were coming from Nabua going to Baao, to Buhi and to Polangui, Albay, now the diversion road passing Salvacion, Masoli, Bato, then to the south road going to Polangui, Albay and there was only one way going to Nueva Caceres (Naga) via Bicol River by boat.

In 1913, the Manila Railroad (MRR) Company Station and the public market were established in their respective present site which readily contributed to the rapid growth of Iriga making it the center of trade and commerce in Rinconada area. It was also at this time that Mondays and Thursdays were declared as market days in Iriga. The Municipality of Iriga continued to prosper through the years. The original “barrios y visitas” have developed sitios which later on, these sitios have metamorphosed into distinct and separate barrios. After the Second World War, San Ramon, San Rafael, Cristo Rey, Santa Isabel, San Vicente Norte, San Andres, Santa Teresita, Perpetual Help, Sagrada, Niño Jesus, San Pedro and Antipolo, former sitios of barrio San Agustin, San Isidro and San Nicolas were created as barrios. And, the barrios of La Anunciacion and Santa Elena were sitios of Santo Domingo and Santiago, Del Rosario (Banao) of Santiago and Santo Niño and La Purisima of San Francisco & part of Santo Domingo, Santa Cruz Sur of San Francisco. Francia and San Jose from San Miguel and San Vicente Sur, Salvacion, La Trinidad and La Medalla from the large barrio of San Antonio. Some of these barrios were already created during the incumbency of Mayor Jose C. Villanueva in 1960. And the latest and the 36th barrio ever created was Santa Maria which comprises the sitios of Tubigan, Katungdulan, Bagacay, Sampaga, Rao and Cawayan of barrio Santa Teresita by virtue of Republic Act 6228.

=== Cityhood ===
Through the support and cooperation of the town's people, Mayor Jose C. Villanueva successfully gained the conversion of Iriga into the signing of R.A 5261 otherwise known as the Charter of Iriga City on July 8, 1968. The city, however, was formally organized and inaugurated as the third city of Bicol on September 3, 1968, by Presidential Proclamation and officiated by President Ferdinand Marcos. Since then, Iriga City has developed significantly, making it a center of trade and commerce in the Rinconada area and the whole Bicol Region as well, as it is strategically located in between the cities of Naga and Legazpi.

=== Present ===
In 2004, Madelaine Alfelor-Gazmen, the daughter of the late Camarines Sur congressman, Ciriaco R. Alfelor and granddaughter of Camarines Sur Governor Felix O. Alfelor, became Iriga's first woman city mayor, and only the third city mayor after his uncle, Emmanuel R. Alfelor was similarly elected in 1995 and served the city for 3 consecutive terms (1995-2004). On May 9, 2016, Iriga produced its first and only senator of the Republic through the successful ascension of senator and human rights defender Leila de Lima in the Philippine Senate.

== Geography ==
Iriga is bounded by the town of Buhi in the east, by the municipalities of Baao, Nabua and Bato in the west, by the province of Albay in the south, and by the municipalities of Ocampo and Sangay in the north.

=== Barangays ===
Iriga City is politically subdivided into 36 barangays. Each barangay consists of puroks and some have sitios.

- Antipolo
- Cristo Rey
- Del Rosario (Banao)
- Francia
- La Anunciacion
- La Medalla
- La Purisima
- La Trinidad
- Niño Jesus
- Perpetual Help
- Sagrada
- Salvacion
- San Agustin
- San Andres
- San Antonio
- San Francisco
- San Isidro
- San Jose
- San Juan
- San Miguel
- San Nicolas
- San Pedro
- San Rafael
- San Ramon
- San Roque
- Santiago
- San Vicente Norte
- San Vicente Sur
- Santa Cruz Norte
- Santa Cruz Sur
- Santa Elena
- Santa Isabel
- Santa Maria
- Santa Teresita
- Santo Domingo
- Santo Niño

=== Climate ===
Climate data for Iriga, Camarines Sur
Month	Jan	Feb	Mar	Apr	May	Jun	Jul	Aug	Sep	Oct	Nov	Dec	Year
Mean daily maximum °C (°F)	33 (91)	32 (90)	35 (95)	37 (99)	37 (99)	36 (97)	35 (95)	33 (91)	35 (95)	34 (93)	33 (91)	32 (90)	34 (94)
Mean daily minimum °C (°F)	26 (79)	26 (79)	28 (82)	30 (86)	31 (88)	31 (88)	29 (84)	28 (82)	29 (84)	28 (82)	28 (82)	27 (81)	28 (83)
Average precipitation mm (inches)	51.03 (2.01)	78.13 (3.08)	55.3 (2.18)	83.07 (3.27)	159.34 (6.27)	239.88 (9.44)	385.8 (15.19)	391.75 (15.42)	293.65 (11.56)	401.33 (15.80)	108.2 (4.26)	334.9 (13.19)	2,582.38 (101.67)
Average rainy days	21	24	19	20	25	29	31	29	29	29	27	30	313
Source: World Weather Online

== Demographics ==
Population census of Iriga
Year	Pop.	±% p.a.
1903	19,297	—
1918	24,145	+1.51%
1939	31,005	+1.20%
1948	42,049	+3.44%
1960	75,439	+4.99%
1970	77,382	+0.25%
1975	75,885	−0.39%
1980	66,113	−2.72%
1990	74,269	+1.17%
1995	82,482	+1.98%
2000	88,893	+1.62%
2007	97,983	+1.35%
2010	105,919	+2.87%
2015	111,757	+1.03%
2020	114,457	+0.50%
2024	115,306	+0.18%
Source: Philippine Statistics Authority

In the 2024 census, the population of Iriga, was 115,306 people, with a density of 840 inhabitants per square kilometre or 2,200 inhabitants per square mile.

=== Language ===
Rinconada Bikol is the primary language of the vast majority of the population. People with Austronesian ancestry speak the Iriga variant of the language while the aboriginal Agta or Negritos use the Agta variant. Both variants are part of the Sinabukid dialect of Rinconada Bikol. Filipino or Tagalog and English are also understood and spoken because they are taught in the education system. Bikol Central is also commonly understood as it is used by the Catholic church and the local TV and radio stations. However, Tagalog is now becoming the primary language by the younger generations, and it is also commonly heard spoken by the members of the Iglesia Ni Cristo for it is the language used in their worship services. Some older residents have some capacity to speak and understand Spanish as it was a compulsory subject in Philippine schools until 1987.

=== Religion ===
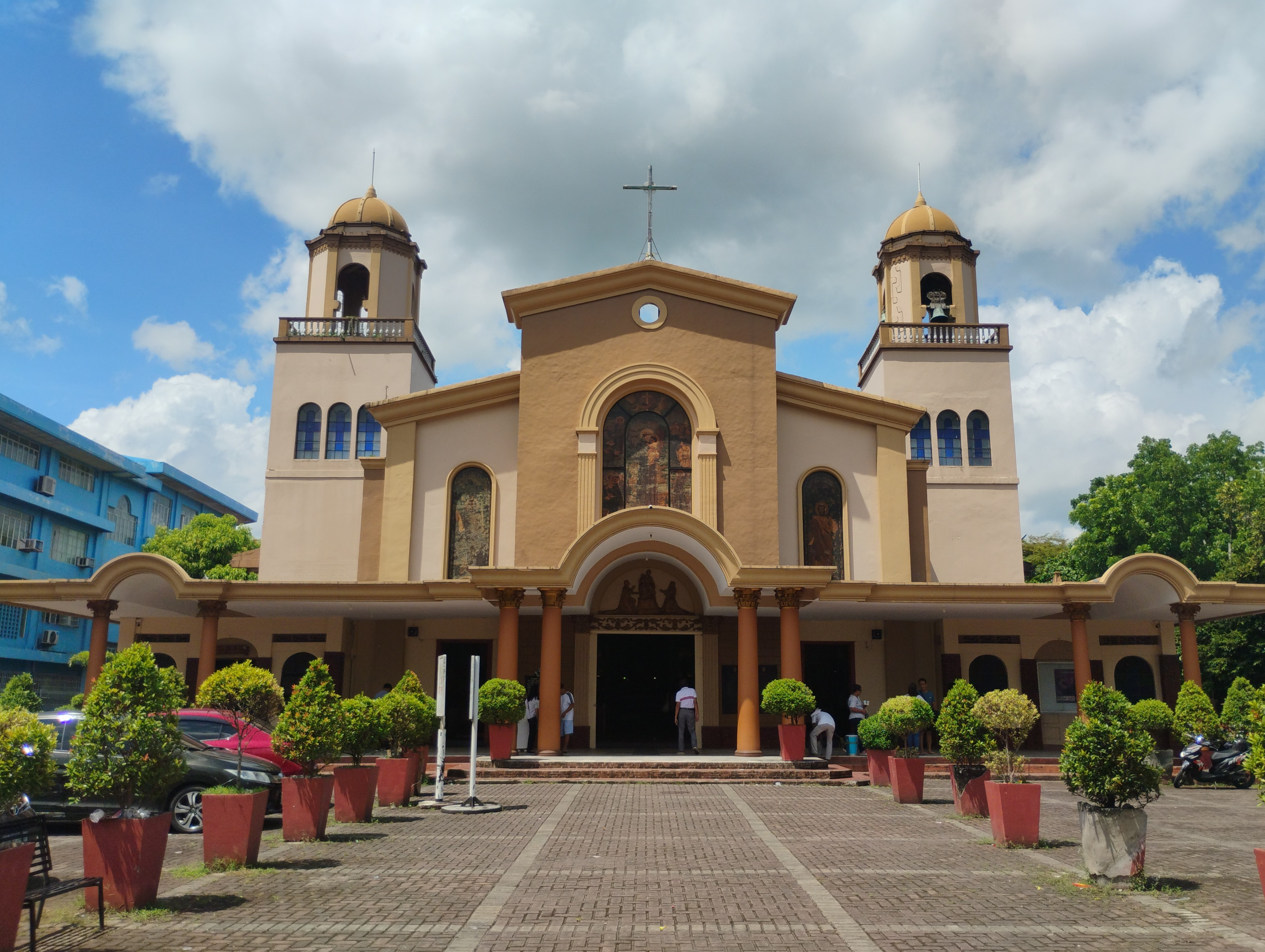
San Antonio de Padua Parish Church

The majority of the city residents are Roman Catholic. The Archdiocese of Caceres has several parishes and churches in the city. The biggest church is the Saint Anthony of Padua Parish Church (Iriga Church) found in the city proper area, while the Lourdes grotto symbolizes the long history of Catholicism in Iriga. Tinagba, a harvest festival, can be seen a fusion of folk tradition and Catholic saint celebration.

Iglesia ni Cristo is the largest minority religion in the city. The INC's district office of ecclesiastical district of Camarines Southeast (CSE) is located in Barangay San Nicolas. The office oversees the church members in Rinconada and Partido areas in Camarines Sur, and Burias island in Masbate. Thus, a large number of INC members can be found in the city. At present, Iglesia ni Cristo has four local congregations and two extensions in Iriga.

Islam is a new religion in the city and most of its members are immigrants from Mindanao island. LDS Church members are also numerous, as well as Jehovah's Witnesses. Baptist adherents are also active in the city.

== Economy ==
Poverty incidence of Iriga (%)

Source: Philippine Statistics Authority

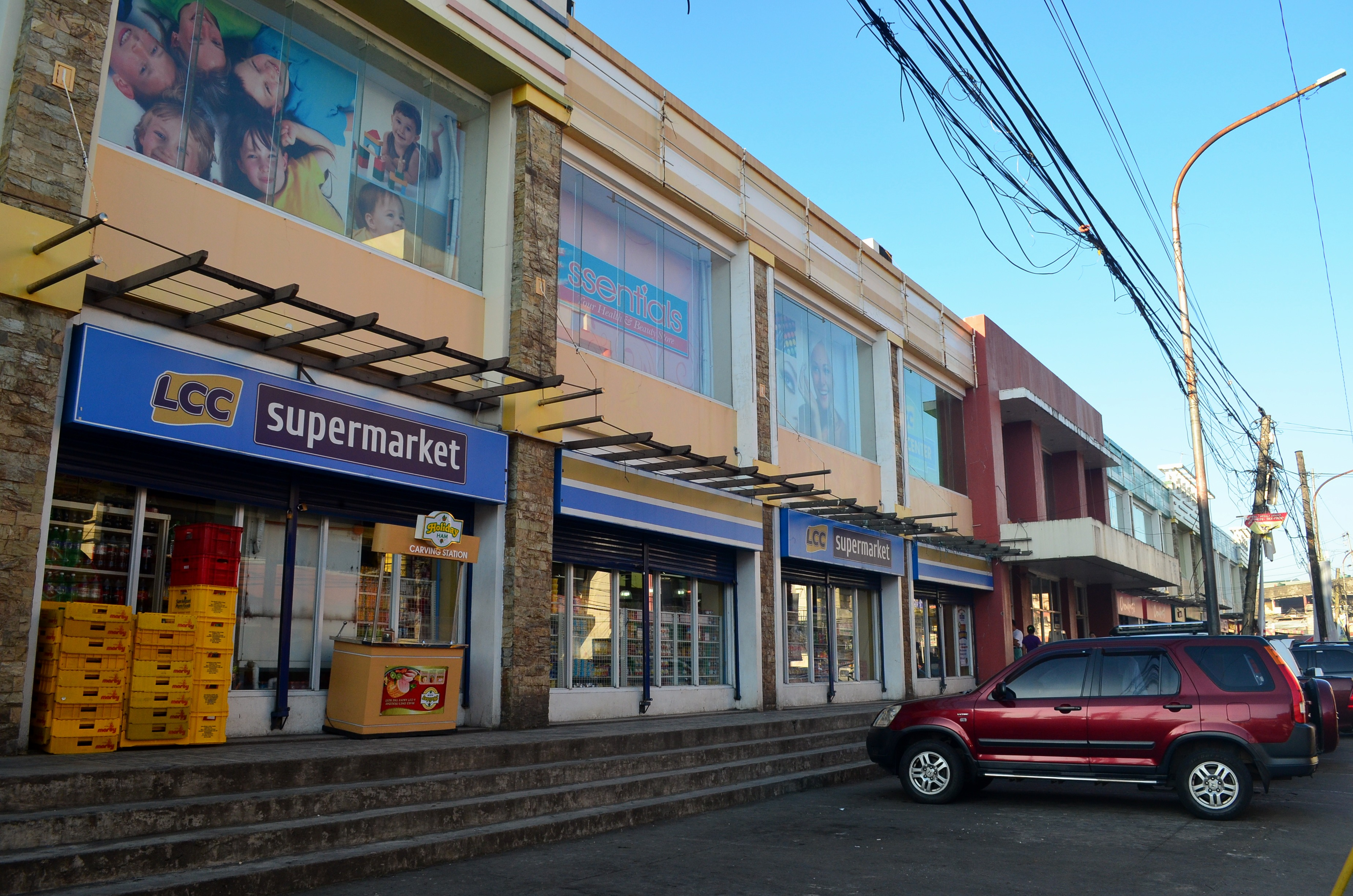
LCC Iriga

Iriga is the 4th largest economy in the entire Bicol region, and may soon become a major economic hub in the future.

The Iriga City Public Market is one of the busiest in the region and serves as a major center of commerce in the Rinconada district. The original market was redesigned and reconstructed in 2010, and now accommodates an LCC supermarket, numerous local shops, and several national chain restaurants. The market offers a wide variety of locally produced goods, including organic produce and freshwater fish such as tilapia sourced from nearby Lake Buhi and Lake Bato. It also features an abundance of fresh and dried saltwater fish from the neighboring coastal town of Balatan. In addition, gift shops sell locally made products crafted from hemp, pili nuts, bamboo, and coconut, catering to both local and visiting tourists.

The city is home to three major commercial complexes namely the LCC Mall Iriga, which was the second LCC Mall in the district, the UNP Town Mall near the University of Northeastern Philippines, Regent Central Commercial Complex and the newly built Gaisano Capital Iriga. A new convention center was built in front of the Catholic Grotto hosts important events in the city.

=== Shopping malls ===
There are two shopping malls in the City of Iriga. LCC Mall Iriga, which is the largest commercial shopping center in the entire Rinconada area, and Gaisano mall, which is the 2nd largest after LCC Mall and possesses many fast food chains.

== Tourism ==
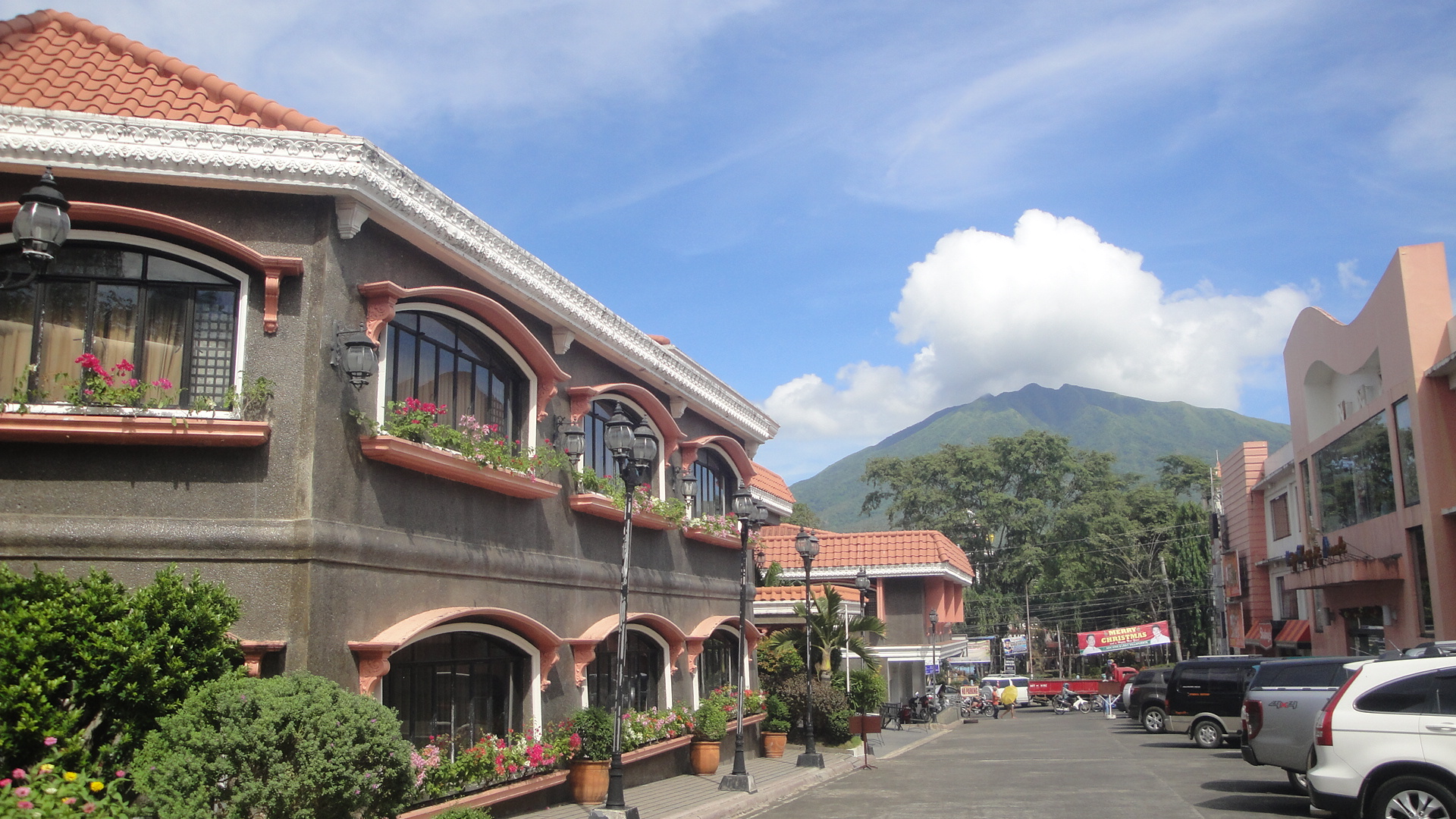
Iriga Plaza Hotel

Found at the downtown Iriga is the City Park which is located near the cathedral and across the old City Hall. It is a well landscaped, Japanese-themed park with a huge spurting fountain at the center but was later replaced with a skating rink. Acacia trees are lit with colored lights during Christmas season. Surrounding the park are business establishments and landmarks such as the Lourdes Grotto which offers a great view of the downtown.

There is a number of waterfalls and springs found in the city. Several resorts and hotels were built to accommodate growing tourist arrivals. The old Ibalon Hotel was renovated and renamed as Iriga City Plaza Hotel. Local cuisine offering meat and vegetarian dishes with coconut milk and red chili peppers.

== Infrastructure ==
=== Railways ===
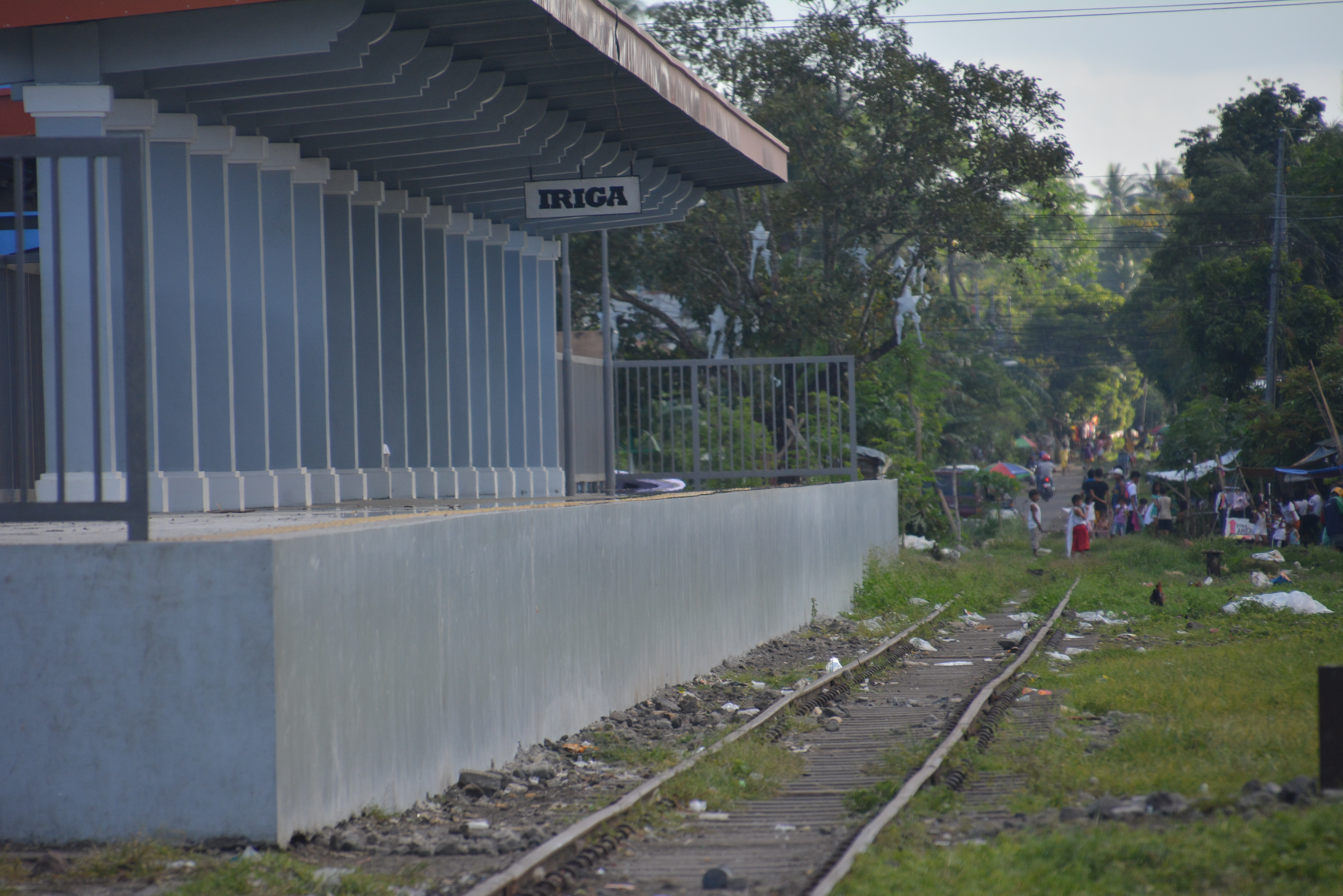
Iriga City station in 2016

Railway services commenced in 1914 as part of the Legazpi Division from Tabaco to Iriga via Legazpi. It was integrated into the Main Line South in 1938. Nora Aunor was known to have been selling cold water and peanuts at the station during her youth, before her rise to stardom.

Iriga, along with other major cities from Tutuban to Legazpi, were served by the Bicol Express, before the service ended in 2006.

Today, railway services are operated by the Philippine National Railways from the Iriga station in Brgy. San Francisco on the Naga–Legazpi route, which was reopened in early 2025.

=== Road transport ===
Iriga is connected to neighbouring towns Nabua and Baao and the Maharlika Highway via the Iriga-Nabua Road and the Iriga-Baao Road.

Iriga's total road network is 366.88 kilometers (227.97 mi) in length, of which 127.97 kilometers (79.52 mi) are paved with concrete, 9.96 kilometers (6.19 mi) with asphalt, with 228.95 kilometers (142.26 mi) being out of gravel. There are also 23 bridges in the city, with the Barit Bridge, built in 1914, being declared a National Cultural Treasure in 2015.

=== Public transport ===
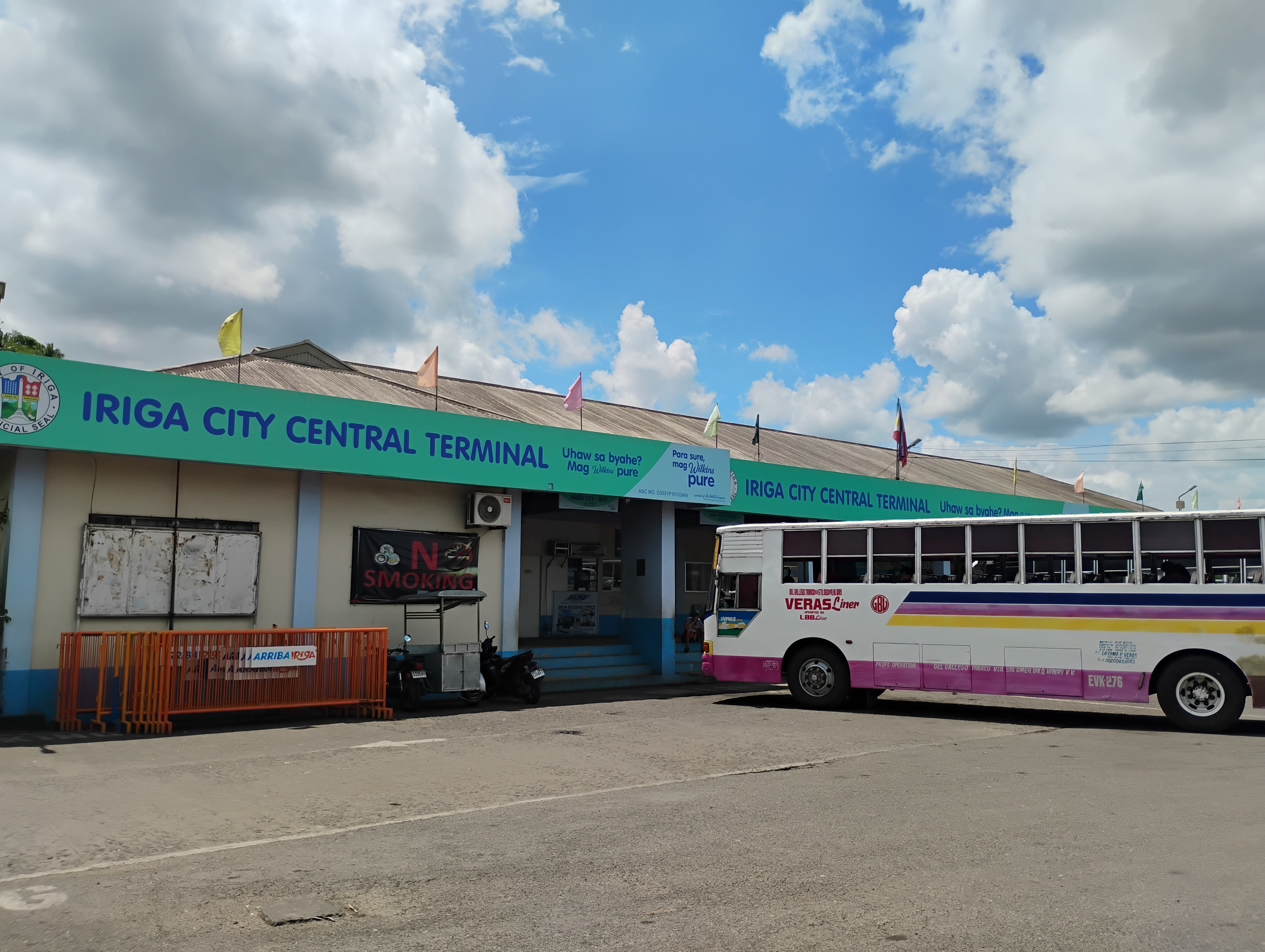
Iriga City Central Terminal

A small central bus terminal was constructed in the city center to accommodate buses, shuttles and jeepneys going to Manila and neighboring towns and cities. Bus companies which serve this terminal include Philtranco, DLTBCo, Alps The Bus Inc., and many others. Tickets can be bought at the terminal, or on the bus, and paid as such.

=== Healthcare ===
Three hospitals operate in the city. The Catholic-convent run Santa Maria Josefa Hospital is well equipped and among the best in the region. Lourdes Hospital and Our Lady of Mediatrix Hospital are also major hospitals in the city. 37 Barangay health stations also operate in local areas.

=== Energy ===
Power is supplied by the Camarines Sur Electric Cooperative (CASURECO) III. Electrification of far villages in the mountain and river districts was completed and now, the city is 100% electrified.

=== Telecommunications ===
Iriga City is served with several nationally operating telecom companies namely Converge ICT, Bayantel, PLDT, Smart, Globe and Dito which offer telephone and internet services. These companies maintain major operations in the city. Iriga City is also the regional base of operations of TV and radio network RPN (Radio Philippines Network) Channel 9. Since 1968, its radio station RPN DZKI-AM (Radyo Ronda Iriga) and television station RPN DWKI-TV 10, which has been operating from the city has dominated the airwaves. There are a few local cable TV operators that dominate the cable TV market, including GMA TV 13 Iriga (affiliated to DZAL of Rinconada Broadcasting Corp.) TV5 planned to set up a 10 KW UHF relay station here. DZIJ-RJTV Channel 21 is set to open in the city.

== Education ==
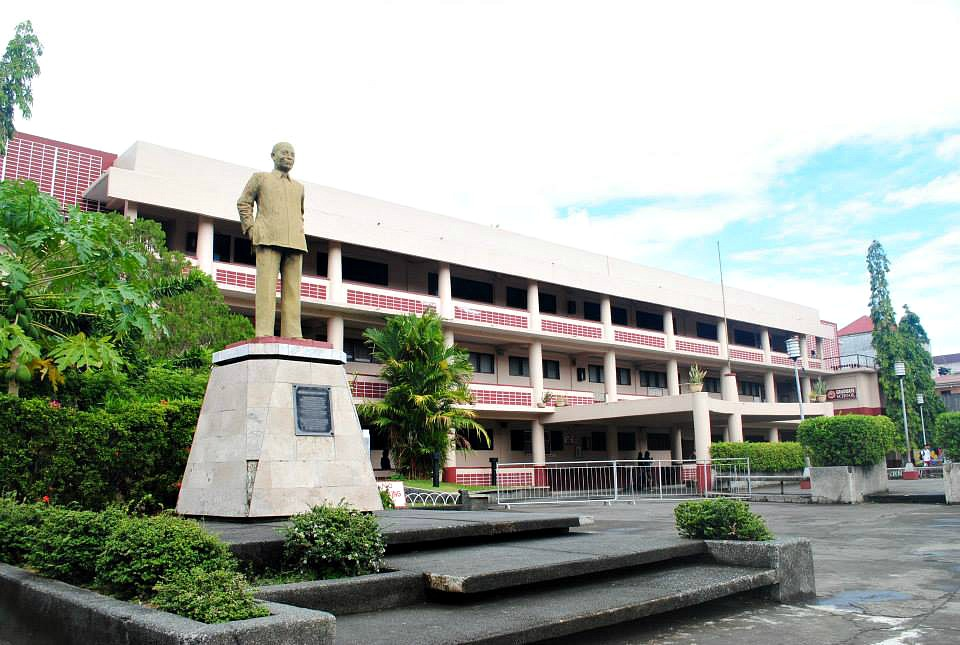
University of Saint Anthony

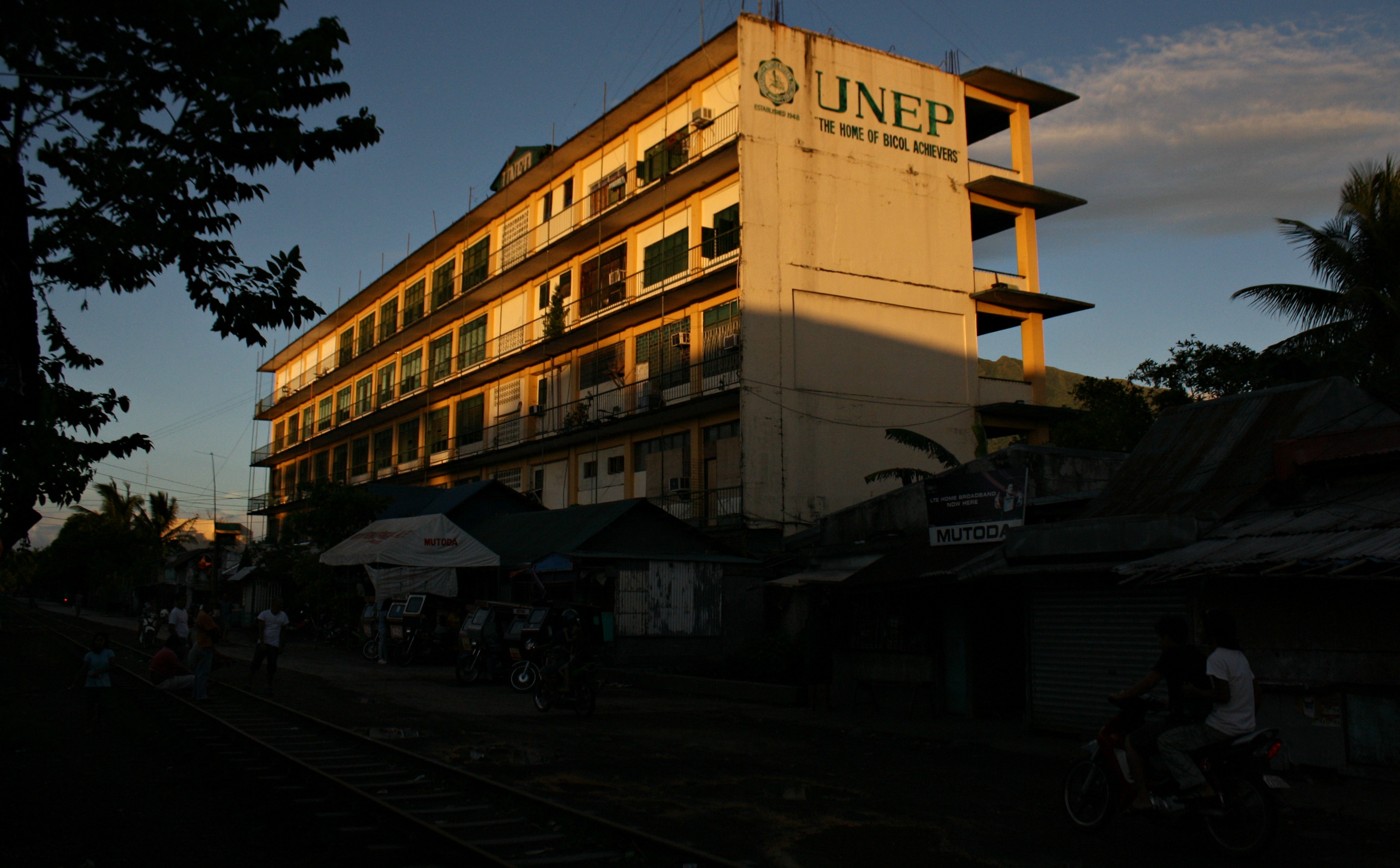
University of Northeastern Philippines

Iriga City is an educational hub as it hosts several universities and colleges that attracts student migrants from the local Rinconada area and even students from nearby Albay province. Aside from higher level institutions, there are multiple primary and secondary public schools that are scattered across the city to serve the youth.

=== Primary and elementary schools ===
- Antipolo Integrated School
- Banao Elementary School
- Cawayan Elementary School
- Cristo Rey Integrated School
- Don Lazaro Madara Memorial Integrated School
- Fatima Integrated Farm School, Inc.
- Francia Elementary School
- Holy Child Educational Learning Center, Inc.
- Iriga Adventist Elementary School, Inc.
- Iriga Central School
- Iriga City Division Integrated Special School (SPED)
- Iriga North Central School
- Iriga San Ramon Adventist Elementary School, Inc.
- Iriga South Central School
- La Anunciacion Elementary School
- La Medalla Elementary School
- La Purisima Elementary School
- La Trinidad Elementary School
- Lighthouse Baptist Academy of Iriga City, Inc.
- Montessori Children's House of Learning, Inc.
- Niño Jesus Elementary School
- Rinconada Allied Cultural School Foundation, Inc.
- Sagrada Adventist Elementary School, Inc.
- Sagrada Elementary School
- Saint Elizabeth School of Iriga, Inc.
- Salvacion Integrated School
- San Andres Elementary School
- San Antonio Elementary School
- San Francisco Elementary School
- San Isidro Elementary School
- San Jose Elementary School
- San Juan Integrated School
- San Miguel Elementary School
- San Nicolas Elementary School
- San Pedro Elementary School
- San Rafael Elementary School
- San Ramon Elementary School
- Santa Cruz Norte Elementary School
- Santa Cruz Sur Elementary School
- Santa Elena Elementary School
- Santa Isabel Elementary School
- Santa Teresita Elementary School
- Santiago Integrated School
- Santo Niño Elementary School
- San Vicente Norte Integrated School
- San Vicente Sur Elementary School
- Tiriktirikan Elementary School
- Tubigan Elementary School

=== Secondary schools ===
- Antipolo Integrated School
- Cristo Rey Integrated School
- Don Lazaro Madara Memorial Integrated School
- Fatima Integrated Farm School, Inc.
- Holy Child Educational Learning Center, Inc.
- Iriga City Division Integrated Special School (SPED)
- Iriga City Science High School
- Lighthouse Baptist Academy of Iriga City, Inc.
- Mother Theresa Colegio De Iriga, Inc.
- Perpetual Help National High School
- Sagrada National High School
- Salvacion Integrated School
- San Agustin Stand Alone Senior High School
- San Antonio National High School
- San Francisco National High School
- San Juan Integrated School
- San Pedro National High School
- Santa Maria National High School
- San Vicente Norte Integrated School
- Santiago Integrated School
- Santo Niño National High School
- Zeferino Arroyo National High School

=== Technical and vocational schools ===
- Rinconada National Technical Vocational School

=== Higher educational institutions ===
- Ama Computer Learning Center College Iriga
- Ceguera Technological Colleges, Inc.
- La Consolacion College Iriga
- Oliveros College, Inc.
- Regina Mondi Colleges, Inc.
- University of Saint Anthony
- University of Northeastern Philippines

== Government ==
=== List of former chief executives ===
==== Capitan municipal ====
- Don Felipe Monponbanua

(1898-1899)

==== Presidente municipal ====
- Don Felipe Monponbanua

(1899-1900)

- Don Eulogio Mirando

(1923-1928)

- Don Santiago Gonzales

(1929-1937)

==== Municipal mayors ====
- Felix Alfelor, Sr.

(1938-1940)

- Don Felix Monte

(1948-1951)

- Don Santiago Ortega, Sr.

(1952-1955)

- Perfecto Taduran

(1956-1959)

- Jose C. Villanueva

(1960-1967)

==== City mayors ====
- Jose C. Vilanueva

(1968-1980; 1988-1995)

- Politico R. Corporal

(OIC - 1980-1986)

- Salvador de Lima

(OIC - 1986-1987)

- Regino A. Revina

(OIC - 1987-1988)

- Emmanuel R. Alfelor

(1995-2004)

- Madelaine Y. Alfelor

(2004-2013; 2016-2022)

- Ronald Felix Y. Alfelor

(2013-2016)

- Rex C. Oliva

(2022–present)

== Notable people ==
- Eddie Ilarde, former Senator
- Leila de Lima, former Senator
- Lilia de Lima, aunt of Leila de Lima a Ramon Magsaysay Awardee.
- Jaime Fabregas, actor, singer, and musical director.
- Nora Aunor, actress and singer
- Mila Ocampo, actress and singer
- Snooky Serna, actress, daughter of Mila Ocampo.
- Ronnie Ricketts, actor
- Lou Bonnevie, singer
- Betty Mendez Livioco, talkshow host.
- Lianne Valentin, actress and television presenter
- Genaro Saavedra, athlete
- Juan Taduran, athlete
