= Iriga Church =

Roman Catholic church in Camarines Sur, Philippines

- Parroquia y Santuario Archidiocesano de San Antonio de Padua
- Saint Anthony of Padua Parish Church
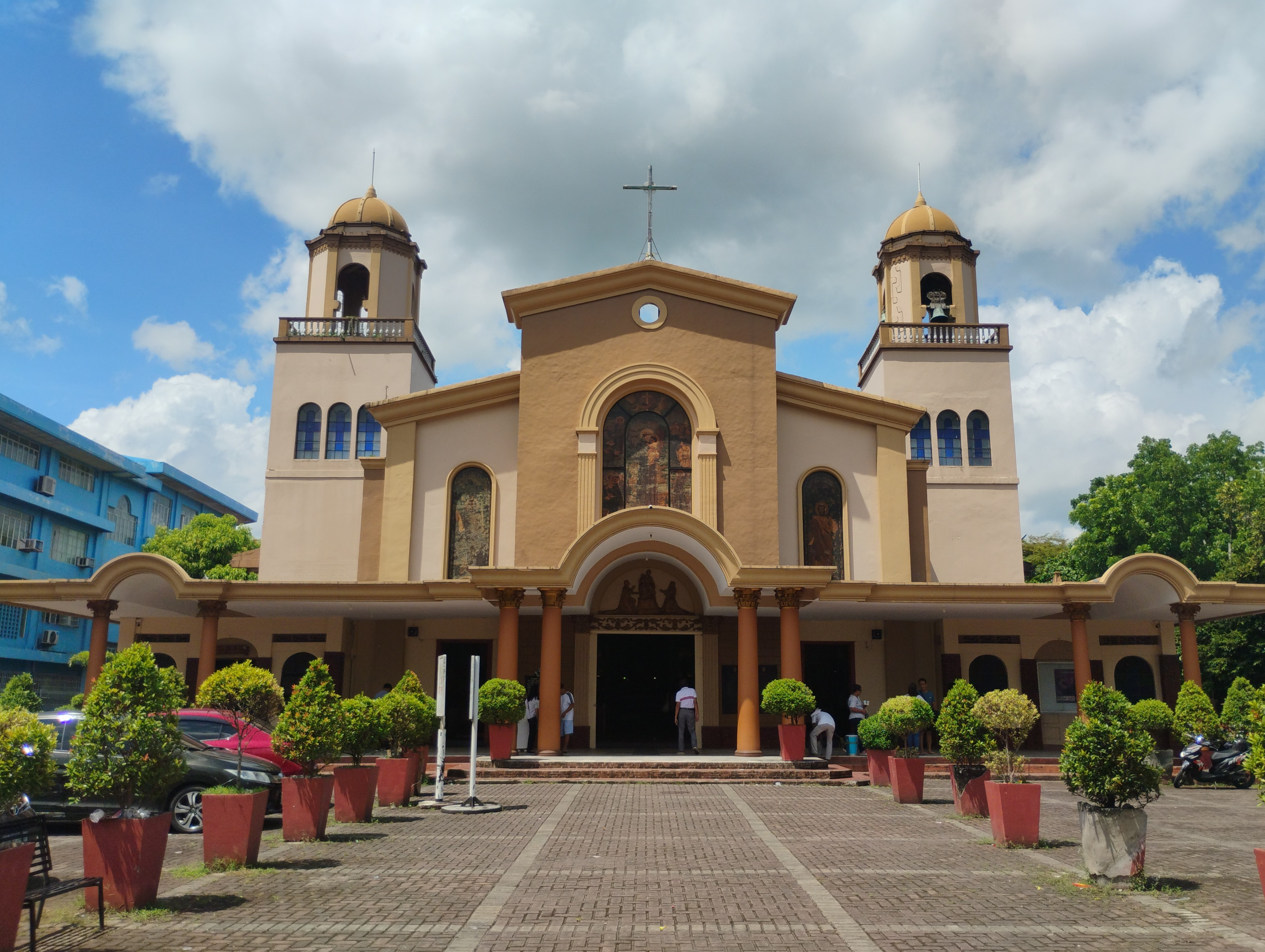
- Church facade in 2025

- Location in Luzon Location in the Philippines
- 13°25′12″N 123°24′45″E
- Location: Iriga, Camarines Sur
- Country: Philippines
- Denomination: Roman Catholic

History
- Status: Parish church
- Founded: 1585; 441 years ago
- Dedication: Saint Anthony of Padua

Architecture
- Functional status: Active
- Heritage designation: National Historical Landmark
- Designated: 1939
- Architectural type: Church building

Administration
- Archdiocese: Caceres

The Parroquia y Santuario Archidiocesano de San Antonio de Padua, commonly known as Saint Anthony of Padua Parish Church and Iriga Church, is a Roman Catholic church located in Iriga, Camarines Sur. It is under the jurisdiction of the Archdiocese of Caceres.

The first church was burned in 1585. The second church was damaged by a typhoon and destroyed by fire. The third church was constructed in 1727 but was also burned in 1841. The present church together with two belfries was constructed shortly afterwards. The National Historical Commission of the Philippines (NHCP) declared it a national landmark in 1939.

== Gallery ==
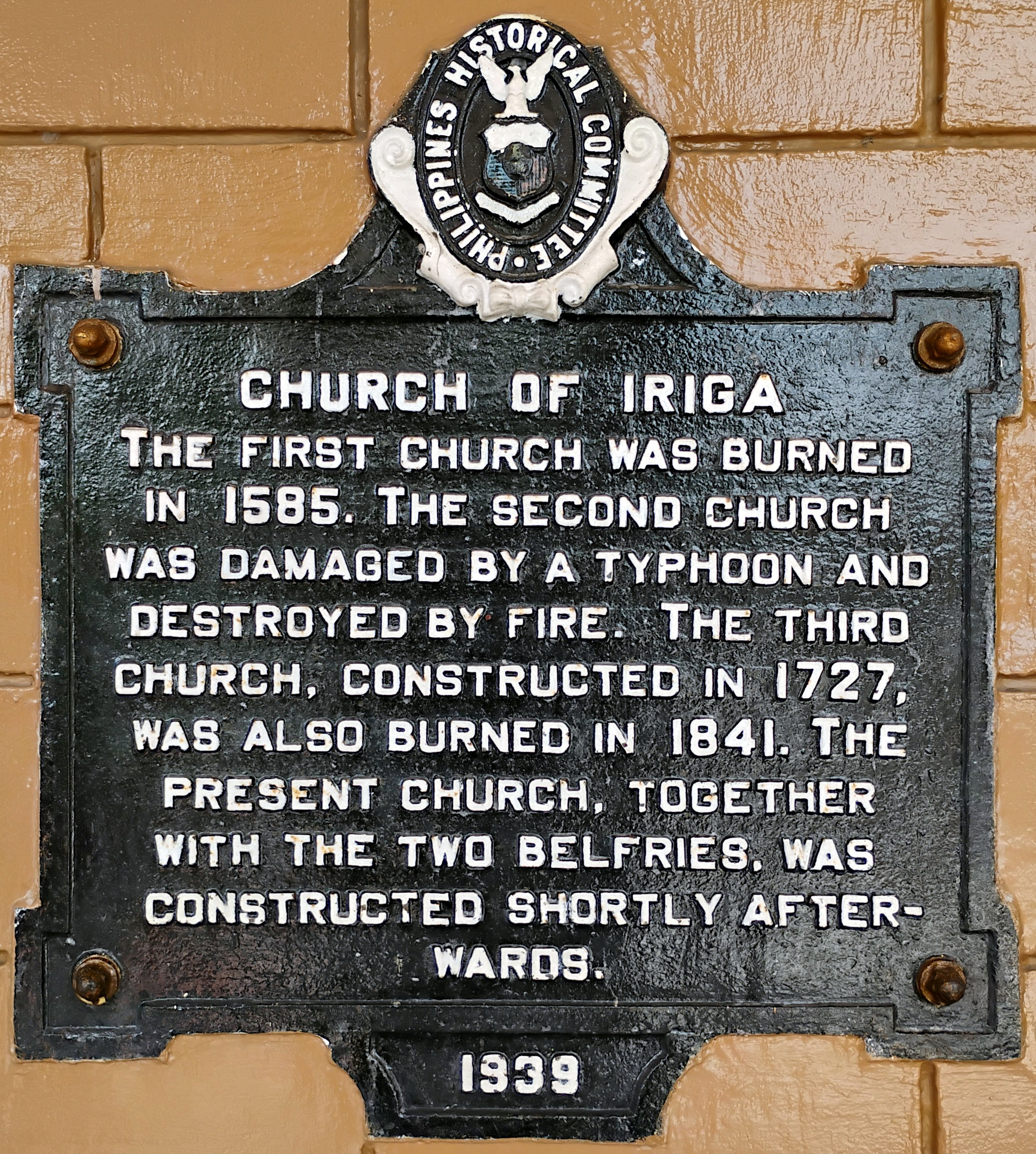
Church PHC historical marker installed in 1939

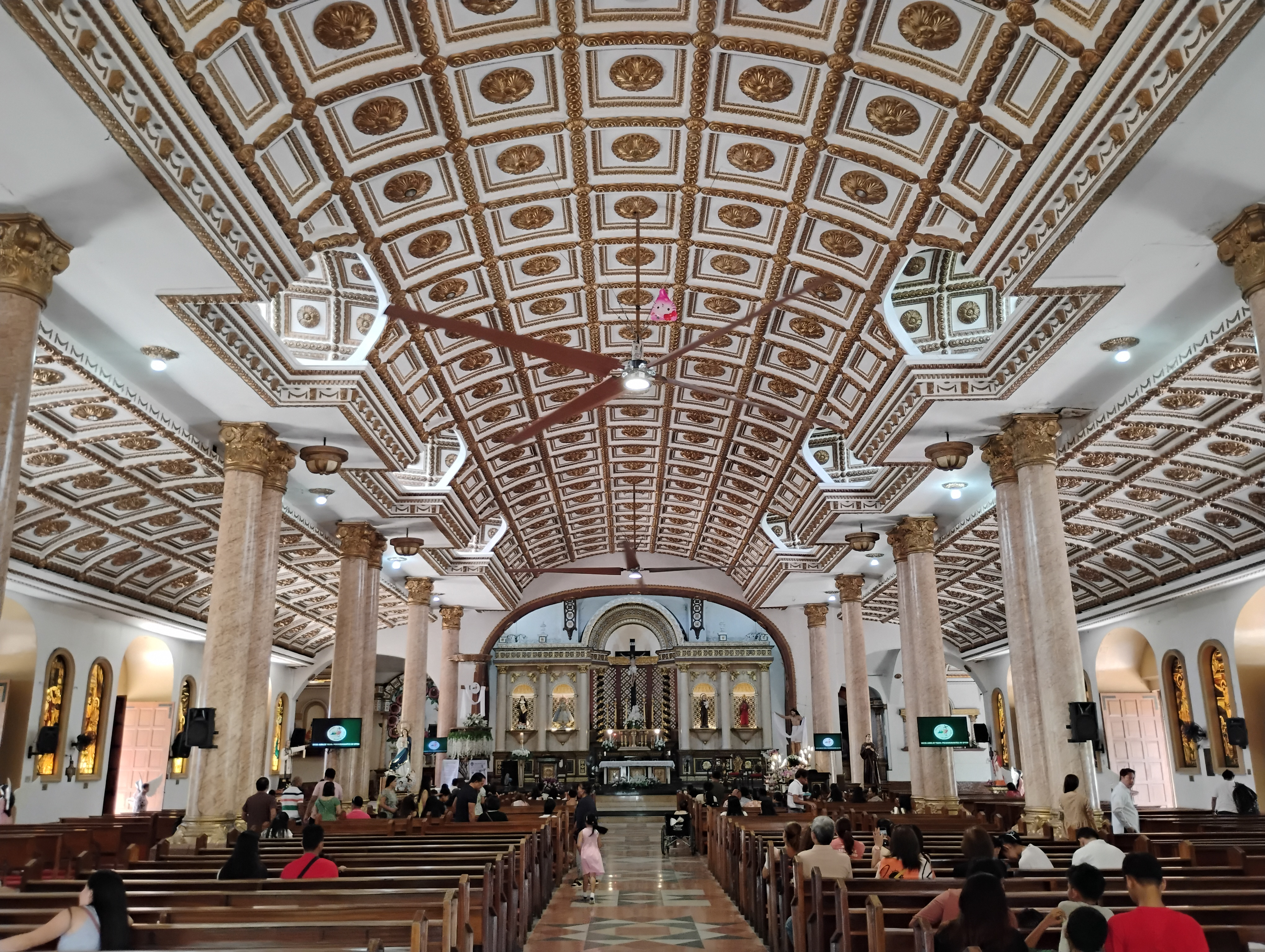
Church interior in 2025

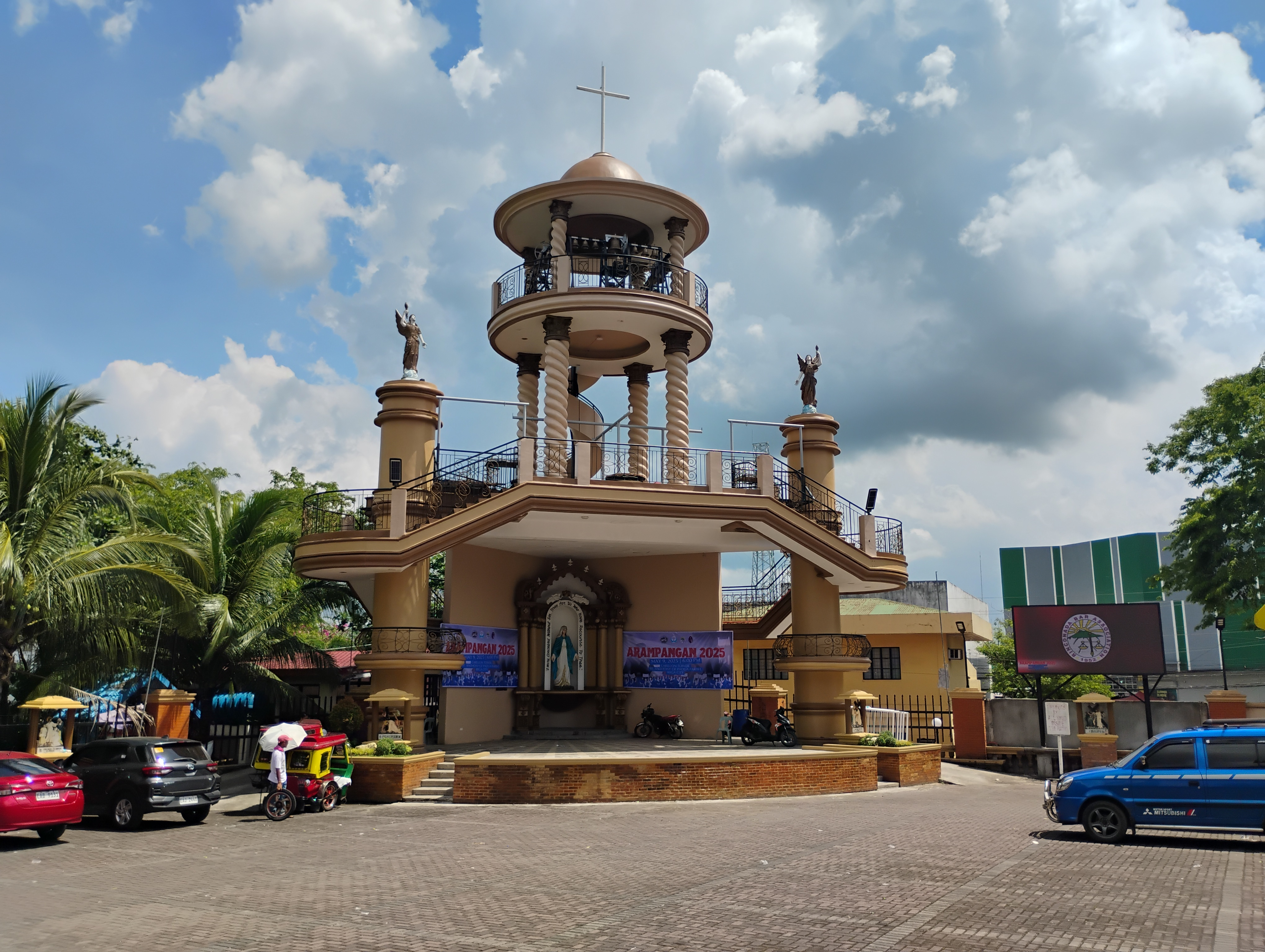
Carillion Tower

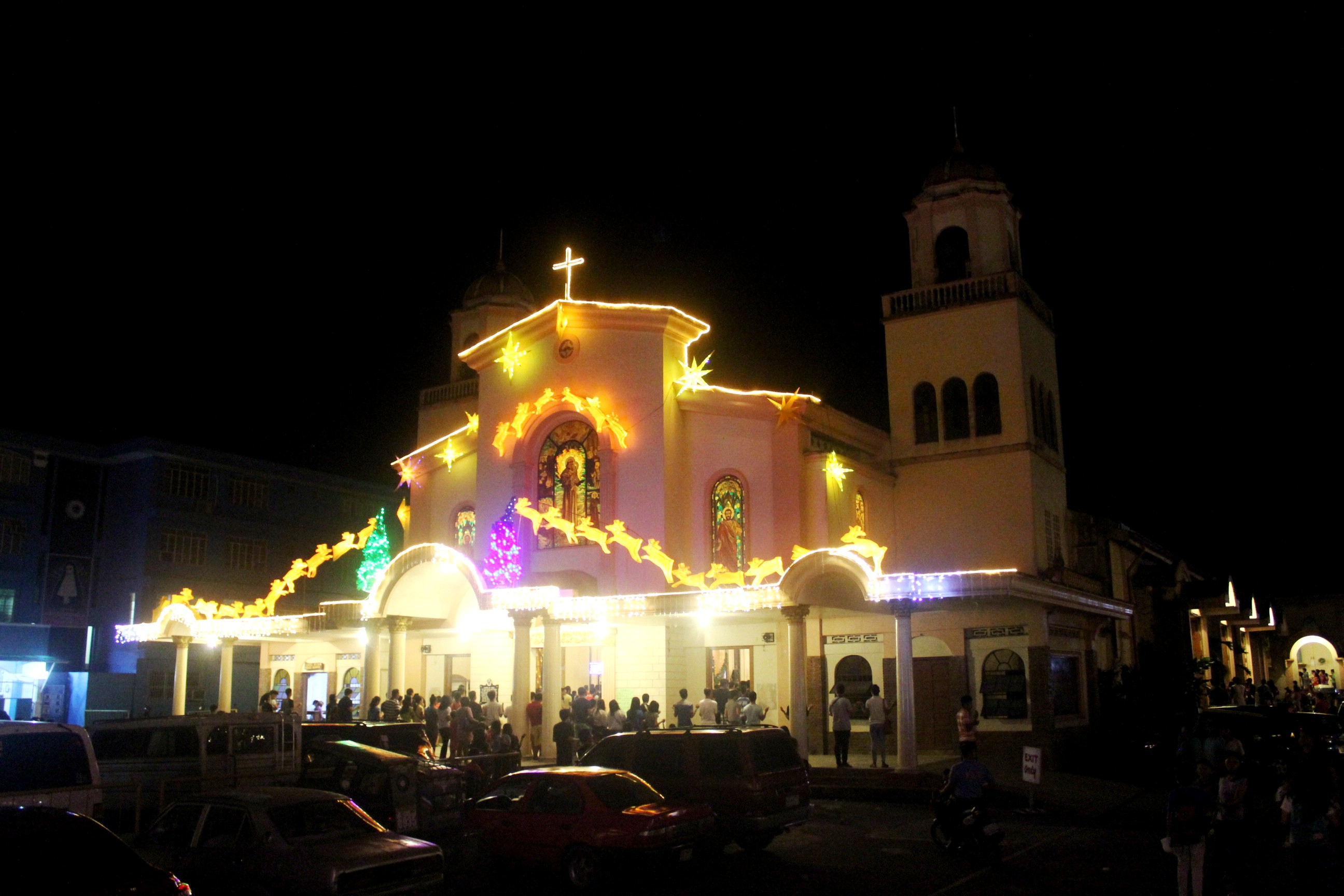
The church at night in 2016
