= Legislative districts of Albay =

Legislative district of the Philippines

The legislative districts of Albay are the representations of the province of Albay in the various national legislatures of the Philippines. The province is currently represented in the lower house of the Congress of the Philippines through its first and second, and third congressional districts.

Catanduanes last formed part of the province's representation in 1946, when it began to elect its own representative as a full-fledged province.

The first district is among the original representative districts from 1907 which has never changed in territorial coverage, along with Ilocos Norte's first and second, Ilocos Sur's first, and Iloilo's first districts.

== History ==
Albay, which at the time included the sub-province of Catanduanes, was initially divided into three assembly districts in 1907. The fourth district – consisting of the sub-province of Catanduanes – was created by virtue of Act No. 3617 enacted in 1929, and elected its own representative starting in 1931. When seats for the upper house of the Philippine Legislature were elected from territory-based districts between 1916 and 1935, the province formed part of the sixth senatorial district which elected two out of the 24-member senate.

In the disruption caused by the Second World War, two delegates represented the province (including the sub-province of Catanduanes) in the National Assembly of the Japanese-sponsored Second Philippine Republic: one was the provincial governor (an ex officio member), while the other was elected through a provincial assembly of KALIBAPI members during the Japanese occupation of the Philippines. Upon the restoration of the Philippine Commonwealth in 1945, the province continued to comprise four districts.

The sub-province of Catanduanes was converted into a regular province by virtue of Commonwealth Act No. 687 enacted on September 26, 1945. The fourth district became the lone district of Catanduanes starting in 1946, thereby reducing the Albay's representation to three.

The province was represented in the Interim Batasang Pambansa as part of Region V from 1978 to 1984, and elected three representatives at-large to the Regular Batasang Pambansa in 1984. Albay retained its three congressional districts under the new Constitution which was proclaimed on February 11, 1987, and elected members to the restored House of Representatives starting that same year.

== Senatorial representation ==
Between 1916 and 1935, Albay (including the sub-province of Catanduanes) was represented in the Senate of the Philippines through the 6th senatorial district of the Philippine Islands. However, in 1935, all senatorial districts were abolished when a unicameral National Assembly was installed under a new constitution following the passage of the Tydings–McDuffie Act, which established the Commonwealth of the Philippines. Since the 1941 elections, when the Senate was restored after a constitutional plebiscite, all twenty-four members of the upper house have been elected countrywide at-large.

== Congressional representation ==
Albay has been represented in the lower house of various Philippine national legislatures since 1907, through its first, second, and third congressional districts.

== Current districts ==
Political parties

Liberal (1)
NUP (1)
Lakas-CMD (1)

Legislative districts and representatives of Albay
District	Current Representative	Party	Constituent LGUs	Population (2020)	Area	Map
1st	Krisel Lagman; Tabaco	Liberal	List: Bacacay; Malilipot; Malinao; Santo Domingo; Tabaco; Tiwi	395,907	547.88 km^{2}	
2nd	Carlos Loria; Legazpi	NUP	List: Camalig; Daraga; Legazpi; Manito; Rapu-rapu	477,781	665.94 km^{2}	
3rd	Raymond Adrian E. Salceda; Polangui	Lakas	List: Guinobatan; Jovellar; Libon; Ligao; Oas; Pio Duran; Polangui	501,080	1,361.95 km^{2}	

== Provincial board districts ==
The municipalities of Albay are represented in the Albay Provincial Board, the Sangguniang Panlalawigan (provincial legislature) of the province, through Albay's first, second, and third provincial board districts.

== See also ==
- Legislative districts of Catanduanes
