= 2010 Philippine House of Representatives elections in the Bicol Region =

Philippine House of Representatives elections in the Bicol Region, 2010
- May 10, 2010

16 seats of the Bicol Region in the House of Representatives
| | First party | Second party |
|---|---|---|
| Party | Lakas–Kampi | Liberal |
| Seats won | 7 | 4 |
| Popular vote | 645,432 | 478,493 |
| Percentage | 30.59% | 22.68% |
| | Third party | Fourth party |
| Party | NPC | Nacionalista |
| Seats won | 3 | 2 |
| Popular vote | 427,135 | 402,297 |
| Percentage | 20.24% | 19.07% |
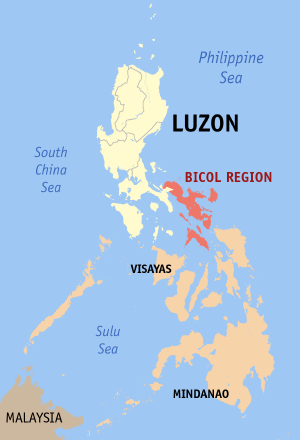
- Location of the Bicol Region within the country.

Elections were held in the Bicol Region for seats in the House of Representatives of the Philippines on May 10, 2010.

The candidate with the most votes won that district's seat for the 15th Congress of the Philippines.

== Summary ==
| Party | Popular vote | % | Seats won |
|---|---|---|---|
| Lakas–Kampi | 645,432 | 30.59% | 7 |
| Liberal | 478,493 | 22.68% | 4 |
| NPC | 427,135 | 20.24% | 3 |
| Nacionalista | 402,297 | 19.07% | 2 |
| PMP | 29,266 | 1.39% | 0 |
| PDP–Laban | 15,794 | 0.75% | 0 |
| Independent | 111,492 | 5.28% | 0 |
| Valid votes | 2,109,909 | 92.51% | 16 |
| Invalid votes* | 170,934 | 7.49% | |
| Turnout* | 2,280,843 | 79.36% | |
| Registered voters | 2,874,126 | 100.00% | |

*Totals for invalid votes and turnout are unavailable in Camarines Norte's districts.

== Albay ==
All incumbent congressmen in Albay are eligible for reelection.

=== 1st District ===
Edcel Lagman is the incumbent.

| Candidate | Party | Votes | % |
|---|---|---|---|
| Edcel Lagman (incumbent) | Lakas–Kampi–CMD | 129,083 | 83.78 |
| Wilfredo Brizuela | Liberal Party | 24,993 | 16.22 |
| Total | | 154,076 | 100.00 |
| Valid votes | | 154,076 | 93.43 |
| Invalid/blank votes | | 10,827 | 6.57 |
| Total votes | | 164,903 | 100.00 |
| Lakas–Kampi–CMD hold | | | |
Source: Commission on Elections

=== 2nd District ===
Al Francis Bichara is the incumbent.

| Candidate | Party | Votes | % |
|---|---|---|---|
| Al Francis Bichara (incumbent) | Nacionalista Party | 117,611 | 62.09 |
| Amelia Bonita Apin | Liberal Party | 58,600 | 30.94 |
| Ricardo Ayala | Independent | 13,214 | 6.98 |
| Total | | 189,425 | 100.00 |
| Valid votes | | 189,425 | 93.43 |
| Invalid/blank votes | | 13,326 | 6.57 |
| Total votes | | 202,751 | 100.00 |
| Nacionalista Party hold | | | |
Source: Commission on Elections

=== 3rd District ===
Reno Lim is the incumbent. Lim faced former Albay governor Fernando Gonzalez.

The result of the election is under protest in the House of Representatives Electoral Tribunal.

| Candidate | Party | Votes | % |
|---|---|---|---|
| Fernando Gonzalez | Liberal Party | 96,000 | 50.66 |
| Reno Lim (incumbent) | Nationalist People's Coalition | 68,701 | 36.25 |
| Brando Sael | Nacionalista Party | 23,487 | 12.39 |
| Armando Redillas | Independent | 1,328 | 0.70 |
| Total | | 189,516 | 100.00 |
| Valid votes | | 189,516 | 92.79 |
| Invalid/blank votes | | 14,715 | 7.21 |
| Total votes | | 204,231 | 100.00 |
| Liberal Party gain from Nationalist People's Coalition | | | |
Source: Commission on Elections

== Camarines Norte ==
Camarines Norte will have two representatives starting in the 15th Congress; the lone district was split into two.

Liwayway Vinzons-Chato will be the last representative of Camarines Norte's lone district; she will run for representative in the new second district.

=== 1st District ===
The result of the election is under protest in the House of Representatives Electoral Tribunal.

| Candidate | Party | Votes | % |
|---|---|---|---|
| Renato Unico Jr. | Lakas–Kampi–CMD | 49,575 | 55.08 |
| Wilfredo Chato Jr. | Liberal Party | 28,180 | 31.31 |
| Pamela Pardo | Independent | 8,138 | 9.04 |
| Jose Español Jr. | Independent | 3,101 | 3.45 |
| Renato Verzo | Independent | 1,014 | 1.13 |
| Total | | 90,008 | 100.00 |
| Valid votes | | 90,008 | 93.08 |
| Invalid/blank votes | | 6,692 | 6.92 |
| Total votes | | 96,700 | 100.00 |
| Lakas–Kampi–CMD gain | | | |
Source: Commission on Elections

=== 2nd District ===
Liwayway Vinzons-Chato is the incumbent.

The result of the election is under protest in the House of Representatives Electoral Tribunal.

| Candidate | Party | Votes | % |
|---|---|---|---|
| Elmer Panotes | Lakas–Kampi–CMD | 51,704 | 50.07 |
| Liwayway Vinzons-Chato | Liberal Party | 47,822 | 46.31 |
| Donald Asis | Independent | 3,734 | 3.62 |
| Total | | 103,260 | 100.00 |
| Valid votes | | 103,260 | 92.93 |
| Invalid/blank votes | | 7,857 | 7.07 |
| Total votes | | 111,117 | 100.00 |
| Lakas–Kampi–CMD gain | | | |
Source: Commission on Elections

== Camarines Sur ==
A new fifth district was carved out of the old first and second districts of Camarines Sur by virtue of Republic Act 9716, becoming the second district. The redistricting was seen to prevent President Gloria Macapagal Arroyo's son and incumbent 1st district representative Diosdado Ignacio Arroyo from being in the same district as Secretary of Budget and Management Rolando Andaya. It was also alleged that the new district fell short of the required minimum of 250,000 inhabitants in order to be a separate district. The old third and fourth districts become the new fourth and fifth districts. Andaya's wife eventually run in his place but eventually withdrew for her husband on December 15, 2009, after filing for substitution. On February 25, 2010, Andaya effectively resigned as Budget Secretary following a Supreme Court decision saying that all appointive officials running for office are deemed resigned.

=== 1st District ===
Incumbent Diosdado Macapagal Arroyo's (Lakas-Kampi-CMD), son of President Gloria Macapagal Arroyo, place of residence was moved from the first to the second district.

| Candidate | Party | Votes | % |
|---|---|---|---|
| Rolando Andaya Jr. | Lakas–Kampi–CMD | 59,175 | 85.31 |
| Nestor de los Reyes | Nacionalista Party | 10,186 | 14.69 |
| Total | | 69,361 | 100.00 |
| Valid votes | | 69,361 | 92.96 |
| Invalid/blank votes | | 5,256 | 7.04 |
| Total votes | | 74,617 | 100.00 |
| Lakas–Kampi–CMD hold | | | |
Source: Commission on Elections

=== 2nd District ===
For the 15th Congress, the 2nd district will comprise some of the municipalities of the old first and second districts, and Naga. The old second district, which didn't include any of the local government units of the new first and second districts, became the new third district.

| Candidate | Party | Votes | % |
|---|---|---|---|
| Dato Arroyo | Lakas–Kampi–CMD | 78,562 | 70.74 |
| Fermin Mabulo | Nacionalista Party | 32,489 | 29.26 |
| Total | | 111,051 | 100.00 |
| Valid votes | | 111,051 | 93.42 |
| Invalid/blank votes | | 7,820 | 6.58 |
| Total votes | | 118,871 | 100.00 |
| Lakas–Kampi–CMD gain from Nationalist People's Coalition | | | |
Source: Commission on Elections

=== 3rd District ===
The old second district is now the third district. The old second district incumbent is Luis Villafuerte Sr. is running.

| Candidate | Party | Votes | % |
|---|---|---|---|
| Luis Villafuerte | Nationalist People's Coalition | 126,116 | 76.68 |
| Jaime Jacob | Liberal Party | 35,927 | 21.84 |
| Oscar Arcilla Jr. | Lapiang Manggagawa | 2,425 | 1.47 |
| Total | | 164,468 | 100.00 |
| Valid votes | | 164,468 | 91.43 |
| Invalid/blank votes | | 15,419 | 8.57 |
| Total votes | | 179,887 | 100.00 |
| Nationalist People's Coalition hold | | | |
Source: Commission on Elections

=== 4th District ===
The old third is now the fourth district. The old third district's incumbent is Arnulfo Fuentebella is running.

| Candidate | Party | Votes | % |
|---|---|---|---|
| Arnulfo Fuentebella | Nationalist People's Coalition | 89,537 | 61.52 |
| Teodoro Cruz Jr. | Lakas–Kampi–CMD | 55,999 | 38.48 |
| Total | | 145,536 | 100.00 |
| Valid votes | | 145,536 | 90.86 |
| Invalid/blank votes | | 14,633 | 9.14 |
| Total votes | | 160,169 | 100.00 |
| Nationalist People's Coalition gain from Lakas–Kampi–CMD | | | |
Source: Commission on Elections

=== 5th District ===
The old fourth district becomes the new fifth district. Old fourth district incumbent Felix Alfelor Jr. (Lakas-Kampi-CMD) is in his third consecutive term and is ineligible for reelection. His son, Emmanuel, is his party's nominee for the new fifth district.

Mariano Trinidad is also entered into an alliance with the Pwersa ng Masang Pilipino.

The result of the election is under protest in the House of Representatives Electoral Tribunal.

| Candidate | Party | Votes | % |
|---|---|---|---|
| Salvio Fortuno | Nacionalista Party | 76,659 | 45.98 |
| Emmanuel Alfelor | Lakas–Kampi–CMD | 75,627 | 45.36 |
| Jesus Jay Dimaiwat | Liberal Party | 13,477 | 8.08 |
| Mariano Trinidad | PDP–Laban | 956 | 0.57 |
| Total | | 166,719 | 100.00 |
| Valid votes | | 166,719 | 91.79 |
| Invalid/blank votes | | 14,907 | 8.21 |
| Total votes | | 181,626 | 100.00 |
| Nacionalista Party gain | | | |
Source: Commission on Elections

== Catanduanes ==
Incumbent Joseph Santiago (Nationalist People's Coalition) is in his third consecutive term already and is ineligible for reelection. NPC didn't name a nominee for the district's seat.

The result of the election is under protest in the House of Representatives Electoral Tribunal.

| Candidate | Party | Votes | % |
|---|---|---|---|
| Cesar Sarmiento | Liberal Party | 50,439 | 41.62 |
| Araceli Wong | Nacionalista Party | 49,726 | 41.03 |
| Leandro Verceles Jr. | Lakas–Kampi–CMD | 16,447 | 13.57 |
| Manuel Luis Sanchez | Independent | 4,591 | 3.79 |
| Total | | 121,203 | 100.00 |
| Valid votes | | 121,203 | 92.97 |
| Invalid/blank votes | | 9,163 | 7.03 |
| Total votes | | 130,366 | 100.00 |
| Liberal Party gain from Nationalist People's Coalition | | | |
Source: Commission on Elections

== Masbate ==
=== 1st District ===
Narciso Bravo Jr. is the incumbent.

| Candidate | Party | Votes | % |
|---|---|---|---|
| Narciso Bravo Jr. (incumbent) | Lakas–Kampi–CMD | 44,732 | 60.45 |
| Karla Bunan | Pwersa ng Masang Pilipino | 29,266 | 39.55 |
| Total | | 73,998 | 100.00 |
| Valid votes | | 73,998 | 95.14 |
| Invalid/blank votes | | 3,778 | 4.86 |
| Total votes | | 77,776 | 100.00 |
| Lakas–Kampi–CMD hold | | | |
Source: Commission on Elections

=== 2nd District ===
Antonio Kho is the incumbent.

| Candidate | Party | Votes | % |
|---|---|---|---|
| Antonio Kho (incumbent) | Lakas–Kampi–CMD | 68,300 | 58.61 |
| Darius Tuason Sr. | Nationalist People's Coalition | 48,232 | 41.39 |
| Total | | 116,532 | 100.00 |
| Valid votes | | 116,532 | 86.42 |
| Invalid/blank votes | | 18,304 | 13.58 |
| Total votes | | 134,836 | 100.00 |
| Lakas–Kampi–CMD hold | | | |
Source: Commission on Elections

=== 3rd District ===
Incumbent Rizalina Seachon-Lanete is running for the provincial governorship; Scott Davies Lanete will run as her party's nominee for the district's seat.

| Candidate | Party | Votes | % |
|---|---|---|---|
| Scott Davies Lanete | Nationalist People's Coalition | 64,769 | 53.42 |
| Demphna Naga | Independent | 53,879 | 44.44 |
| Alex Almario | Liberal Party | 2,598 | 2.14 |
| Total | | 121,246 | 100.00 |
| Valid votes | | 121,246 | 88.94 |
| Invalid/blank votes | | 15,071 | 11.06 |
| Total votes | | 136,317 | 100.00 |
| Nationalist People's Coalition hold | | | |
Source: Commission on Elections

== Sorsogon ==
=== 1st District ===
Salvador Escudero is the incumbent.

| Candidate | Party | Votes | % |
|---|---|---|---|
| Salvador Escudero (incumbent) | Nationalist People's Coalition | 89,512 | 58.58 |
| Jose Edwin Hamor | Nacionalista Party | 63,287 | 41.42 |
| Total | | 152,799 | 100.00 |
| Valid votes | | 152,799 | 93.13 |
| Invalid/blank votes | | 11,274 | 6.87 |
| Total votes | | 164,073 | 100.00 |
| Nationalist People's Coalition hold | | | |
Source: Commission on Elections

=== 2nd District ===
Incumbent Jose Solis (Lakas-Kampi-CMD) is in his third consecutive term and is thus ineligible for reelection.

| Candidate | Party | Votes | % |
|---|---|---|---|
| Deogracias Ramos | Liberal Party | 30,945 | 21.69 |
| Ricardo Golpeo | Nationalist People's Coalition | 29,780 | 20.87 |
| Juan Guysayko | Nacionalista Party | 28,852 | 20.22 |
| Arze Glipo | PDP–Laban | 14,838 | 10.40 |
| Flocerfida de Guzman | Lakas–Kampi–CMD | 13,822 | 9.69 |
| Sappho Ong | Independent | 12,142 | 8.51 |
| Cyril Ramos | Independent | 10,501 | 7.36 |
| Edmundo Escalante | Pwersa ng Masang Pilipino | 1,168 | 0.82 |
| Rosario Gavanzo | Independent | 629 | 0.44 |
| Total | | 142,677 | 100.00 |
| Valid votes | | 142,677 | 89.67 |
| Invalid/blank votes | | 16,441 | 10.33 |
| Total votes | | 159,118 | 100.00 |
| Liberal Party gain from Lakas–Kampi–CMD | | | |
Source: Commission on Elections
