= Albay's 3rd congressional district =

House of Representatives of the Philippines legislative district

- Constituency for the House of Representatives of the Philippines
- Map of Albay's 3rd congressional district

- Location of Albay within the Philippines
- Province: Albay
- Region: Bicol Region
- Population: 489,114 (2020)
- Electorate: 337,820 (2025)
- Major settlements: 7 LGUs: Cities; Ligao; Municipalities; Guinobatan; Jovellar; Libon; Oas; Pio Duran; Polangui
- Area: 1,361.95 km^{2} (525.85 sq mi)

Current constituency
- Created: 1907
- Representative: Adrian Salceda
- Political party: Lakas
- Congressional bloc: Majority

Albay's 3rd congressional district is one of the three congressional districts of the Philippines in the province of Albay. It has been represented in the House of Representatives of the Philippines since 1916 and earlier in the Philippine Assembly from 1907 to 1916. The district consists of the city of Ligao and adjacent municipalities of Guinobatan, Jovellar, Libon, Oas, Pio Duran and Polangui. It is currently represented in the 20th Congress by Adrian Salceda of the Lakas-CMD (Lakas).

== List of members representing the district ==
=== Philippine Assembly (1907–1916) ===
No.	Portrait	Member	Term of office		Legislature	Party	Electoral history	Constituent LGUs
No.	Portrait	Member	Start	End	Legislature	Party	Electoral history	Constituent LGUs
District created January 9, 1907.
1		Angel Roco	October 16, 1907	October 16, 1909	1st Legislature	Progresista	Elected in 1907.	1907–1916; Camalig, Guinobatan, Jovellar, Libon, Ligao, Oas, Polangui
2		Felix Samson	October 16, 1909	October 16, 1912	2nd Legislature	Nacionalista	Elected in 1909.	1907–1916; Camalig, Guinobatan, Jovellar, Libon, Ligao, Oas, Polangui
3		Ceferino Villareal	October 16, 1912	October 16, 1916	3rd Legislature	Nacionalista	Elected in 1912.	1907–1916; Camalig, Guinobatan, Jovellar, Libon, Ligao, Oas, Polangui

=== House of Representatives (1916–1935) ===
No.	Portrait	Member	Term of office		Legislature	Party	Electoral history	Constituent LGUs
No.	Portrait	Member	Start	End	Legislature	Party	Electoral history	Constituent LGUs
4		Tomas Luna	October 16, 1916	June 3, 1919	4th Legislature	Progresista	Elected in 1916.	1916–1931; Camalig, Guinobatan, Jovellar, Libon, Ligao, Oas, Polangui
5		Mariano Marbella	June 3, 1919	June 6, 1922	5th Legislature	Nacionalista	Elected in 1919.	1916–1931; Camalig, Guinobatan, Jovellar, Libon, Ligao, Oas, Polangui
6		Pedro Sabido	June 6, 1922	June 5, 1934	6th Legislature	Nacionalista Unipersonalista	Elected in 1922.	1916–1931; Camalig, Guinobatan, Jovellar, Libon, Ligao, Oas, Polangui
6		Pedro Sabido	June 6, 1922	June 5, 1934	7th Legislature	Nacionalista Consolidado	Re-elected in 1925.	1916–1931; Camalig, Guinobatan, Jovellar, Libon, Ligao, Oas, Polangui
6		Pedro Sabido	June 6, 1922	June 5, 1934	8th Legislature	Nacionalista Consolidado	Re-elected in 1928.	1916–1931; Camalig, Guinobatan, Jovellar, Libon, Ligao, Oas, Polangui
6		Pedro Sabido	June 6, 1922	June 5, 1934	9th Legislature	Nacionalista Consolidado	Re-elected in 1931.	1931–1935; Guinobatan, Jovellar, Libon, Ligao, Oas, Polangui
7		Sulpicio Cea	June 5, 1934	September 16, 1935	10th Legislature	Nacionalista Democratico	Elected in 1934.	1931–1935; Guinobatan, Jovellar, Libon, Ligao, Oas, Polangui

=== National Assembly (1935–1945) ===
==== Commonwealth ====
No.	Portrait	Member	Term of office		Legislature	Party	Electoral history	Constituent LGUs
No.	Portrait	Member	Start	End	Legislature	Party	Electoral history	Constituent LGUs
(6)		Pedro Sabido	September 16, 1935	November 3, 1939	1st National Assembly	Nacionalista Democrata Pro-Independencia	Elected in 1935.	1935–1941; Guinobatan, Jovellar, Libon, Ligao, Oas, Polangui
(6)		Pedro Sabido	September 16, 1935	November 3, 1939	2nd National Assembly	Nacionalista	Re-elected in 1938. Resigned on appointment as National Abaca and other Fibers Corporation manager.	1935–1941; Guinobatan, Jovellar, Libon, Ligao, Oas, Polangui
8		Marcial Rañola	December 10, 1940	December 30, 1941	2nd National Assembly	Nacionalista	Elected in 1940 to finish Sabido's term.	1935–1941; Guinobatan, Jovellar, Libon, Ligao, Oas, Polangui
District dissolved into the two-seat Albay's at-large district for the Second Republic National Assembly.

=== House of Representatives (1945–1973) ===
No.	Portrait	Member	Term of office		Legislature	Party	Electoral history	Constituent LGUs
No.	Portrait	Member	Start	End	Legislature	Party	Electoral history	Constituent LGUs
District re-created May 24, 1945.
(8)		Marcial Rañola	June 9, 1945	December 30, 1949	1st Commonwealth Congress	Nacionalista	Re-elected in 1941.	1945–1969; Guinobatan, Jovellar, Libon, Ligao, Oas, Polangui
(8)		Marcial Rañola	June 9, 1945	December 30, 1949	2nd Commonwealth Congress	Nacionalista	Re-elected in 1946.	1945–1969; Guinobatan, Jovellar, Libon, Ligao, Oas, Polangui
(8)		Marcial Rañola	June 9, 1945	December 30, 1949	1st Congress	Nacionalista	Re-elected in 1946.	1945–1969; Guinobatan, Jovellar, Libon, Ligao, Oas, Polangui
9		Pío Duran	December 30, 1949	February 28, 1961	2nd Congress	Nacionalista	Elected in 1949.	1945–1969; Guinobatan, Jovellar, Libon, Ligao, Oas, Polangui
9		Pío Duran	December 30, 1949	February 28, 1961	3rd Congress	Nacionalista	Re-elected in 1953.	1945–1969; Guinobatan, Jovellar, Libon, Ligao, Oas, Polangui
9		Pío Duran	December 30, 1949	February 28, 1961	4th Congress	Nacionalista	Re-elected in 1957. Died in office.	1945–1969; Guinobatan, Jovellar, Libon, Ligao, Oas, Polangui
Vacant			February 28, 1961	December 30, 1961	4th Congress	—	No special election held to fill vacancy.	1945–1969; Guinobatan, Jovellar, Libon, Ligao, Oas, Polangui
10		Josefina Duran	December 30, 1961	December 30, 1969	5th Congress	Liberal	Elected in 1961.	1945–1969; Guinobatan, Jovellar, Libon, Ligao, Oas, Polangui
10		Josefina Duran	December 30, 1961	December 30, 1969	6th Congress	Liberal	Re-elected in 1965.	1945–1969; Guinobatan, Jovellar, Libon, Ligao, Oas, Polangui
11		Roberto Sabido	December 30, 1969	January 17, 1973	7th Congress	Nacionalista	Elected in 1969. Term cut short upon the ratification of a new Constitution.	1969–1973; Guinobatan, Jovellar, Libon, Ligao, Oas, Pio Duran, Polangui
District dissolved into the twelve-seat Region V's at-large district for the Interim Batasang Pambansa, followed by the three-seat Albay's at-large district for the Regular Batasang Pambansa.

=== House of Representatives (1987–present) ===
No.	Portrait	Member	Term of office		Legislature	Party	Electoral history	Constituent LGUs
No.	Portrait	Member	Start	End	Legislature	Party	Electoral history	Constituent LGUs
District re-created February 2, 1987.
12		Elfren Sarte	June 30, 1987	July 22, 1988	8th Congress	Liberal	Elected in 1987. Died in office.	1987–present Guinobatan, Jovellar, Libon, Ligao, Oas, Pio Duran, Polangui
Vacant			July 22, 1988	June 30, 1992	8th Congress	—	No special election held to fill vacancy.	1987–present Guinobatan, Jovellar, Libon, Ligao, Oas, Pio Duran, Polangui
13		Al Francis Bichara	June 30, 1992	June 30, 1995	9th Congress	NPC	Elected in 1992.	1987–present Guinobatan, Jovellar, Libon, Ligao, Oas, Pio Duran, Polangui
14		Romeo Salalima	June 30, 1995	June 30, 1998	10th Congress	NPC	Elected in 1995.	1987–present Guinobatan, Jovellar, Libon, Ligao, Oas, Pio Duran, Polangui
15		Joey Salceda	June 30, 1998	February 10, 2007	11th Congress	LAMMP	Elected in 1998.	1987–present Guinobatan, Jovellar, Libon, Ligao, Oas, Pio Duran, Polangui
15		Joey Salceda	June 30, 1998	February 10, 2007	12th Congress	Lakas	Re-elected in 2001.	1987–present Guinobatan, Jovellar, Libon, Ligao, Oas, Pio Duran, Polangui
15		Joey Salceda	June 30, 1998	February 10, 2007	13th Congress	Lakas	Re-elected in 2004. Resigned on appointment as presidential chief of staff.	1987–present Guinobatan, Jovellar, Libon, Ligao, Oas, Pio Duran, Polangui
Vacant			February 10, 2007	June 30, 2007	13th Congress	–	No special election held to fill vacancy.	1987–present Guinobatan, Jovellar, Libon, Ligao, Oas, Pio Duran, Polangui
16		Reno Lim	June 30, 2007	June 30, 2010	14th Congress	NPC	Elected in 2007.	1987–present Guinobatan, Jovellar, Libon, Ligao, Oas, Pio Duran, Polangui
17		Fernando V. Gonzalez	June 30, 2010	June 30, 2019	15th Congress	Liberal	Elected in 2010.	1987–present Guinobatan, Jovellar, Libon, Ligao, Oas, Pio Duran, Polangui
17		Fernando V. Gonzalez	June 30, 2010	June 30, 2019	16th Congress	Liberal	Re-elected in 2013.	1987–present Guinobatan, Jovellar, Libon, Ligao, Oas, Pio Duran, Polangui
17		Fernando V. Gonzalez	June 30, 2010	June 30, 2019	17th Congress	PDP–Laban	Re-elected in 2016.	1987–present Guinobatan, Jovellar, Libon, Ligao, Oas, Pio Duran, Polangui
18		Fernando Cabredo	June 30, 2019	June 30, 2025	18th Congress	PDP–Laban	Elected in 2019.	1987–present Guinobatan, Jovellar, Libon, Ligao, Oas, Pio Duran, Polangui
18		Fernando Cabredo	June 30, 2019	June 30, 2025	19th Congress	NUP	Re-elected in 2022.	1987–present Guinobatan, Jovellar, Libon, Ligao, Oas, Pio Duran, Polangui
19		Adrian Salceda	June 30, 2025	Incumbent	20th Congress	Lakas	Elected in 2025.	1987–present Guinobatan, Jovellar, Libon, Ligao, Oas, Pio Duran, Polangui

== Election results ==
=== 1953 ===
1953 Philippine House of Representatives elections in Albay
Party	Candidate	Votes	%
Nacionalista	Pio Duran (incumbent)	9,809	33.39
Liberal	Marcial Rañola	9,068	30.87
Liberal	Florentino Jaucian	6,579	22.40
Liberal	Jose Santiago Sarte	3,918	13.34
Independent	Luis Samarista	1	0.00
Total votes		29,375	100.00
Nacionalista hold			

=== 1965 ===
1965 Philippine House of Representatives elections in Albay
Party	Candidate	Votes	%
Liberal	Josefina Duran (incumbent)	25,420	50.48
Nacionalista	Venicio Flores	18,552	36.84
Nacionalista	Ramon Fernandez	5,717	11.35
Independent	Ciriaco Sayson	667	1.32
Total votes		50,356	100.00
Liberal hold			

=== 1992 ===
1992 Philippine House of Representatives elections in Albay
Party	Candidate	Votes	%
NPC	Al Francis Bichara	36,788	44.58
PMP	Juan Sarte	14,802	17.94
Lakas	Benjamin Matias	12,372	14.99
LDP	Donardo Paglinawan	9,963	12.07
Independent	Roberto Ramin	3,811	4.62
LP–PDP	Pura Ferrer-Calleja	2,462	2.98
Independent	Senen Burgos	1,885	2.28
NPC	Leoncio Opida	440	0.53
Total votes		82,523	100.00
NPC gain from LP–PDP			

=== 1995 ===
1995 Philippine House of Representatives elections in Albay
Party	Candidate	Votes	%
NPC	Romeo Salalima	61,926	62.23
Independent	Benjamin Matias	21,363	21.47
PDP–Laban	Pedro Sabido Jr.	16,228	16.31
Total votes		99,517	100.00
NPC hold			

=== 1998 ===
1998 Philippine House of Representatives elections in Albay
Party	Candidate	Votes	%
LAMMP	Joey Salceda	64,020	47.87
Lakas	Romeo Salalima (incumbent)	59,168	44.24
Reporma	Hermes Ribaya	10,553	7.89
Total votes		133,741	100.00
LAMMP gain from Lakas			

=== 2010 ===
2010 Philippine House of Representatives elections in Albay
Party	Candidate	Votes	%
Liberal	Fernando Gonzalez	96,000	47.00
NPC	Reno Lim	68,701	33.64
Nacionalista	Brando Sael	23,487	11.50
Independent	Armando Redillas	1,328	0.65
Valid ballots		189,516	92.79
Invalid or blank votes		14,715	7.21
Total votes		204,231	100.00.00
Liberal gain from NPC			

=== 2013 ===
2013 Philippine House of Representatives elections in Albay
Party	Candidate	Votes	%
Liberal	Fernando Gonzalez (incumbent)	101,270	64.36
Independent	Dante Arandia	40,634	25.82
Invalid or blank votes		15,449	9.82
Total votes		157,353	100.00.00
Liberal hold			

=== 2016 ===
2016 Philippine House of Representatives elections in Albay
Party	Candidate	Votes	%
Liberal	Fernando Gonzalez (incumbent)	174,554	
Independent	Oliver Olaybal	10,134	
Independent	Elmer Felix Pornel	2,803	
Invalid or blank votes		40,554	
Total votes		228,045	100.00
Liberal hold			

=== 2019 ===
2019 Philippine House of Representatives elections in Albay
Party	Candidate	Votes	%
PDP–Laban	Fernando Cabredo	107,384	52.18
NPC	Reno Lim	88,745	43.12
Independent	Mario Marcos	8,344	4.05
Independent	Elmer Felix Pornel	1,316	0.63
Invalid or blank votes		30,776	
Total votes		237,284	
PDP–Laban hold			

=== 2022 ===
2022 Philippine House of Representatives elections in Albay
Party	Candidate	Votes	%
NUP	Fernando Cabredo (incumbent)	165,111	100.00
Total votes		165,111	100.00
NUP hold			

=== 2025 ===
2025 Philippine House of Representatives elections in Albay
Party	Candidate	Votes	%
Lakas	Adrian Salceda	144,693	50.95
NUP	Fernando Cabredo (incumbent)	139,308	49.05
Total votes		284,001	100.00
Turnout		299,247	88.57
Lakas gain from NUP			

== See also ==
- Legislative districts of Albay
