= Fernando Cabredo =

Filipino politician

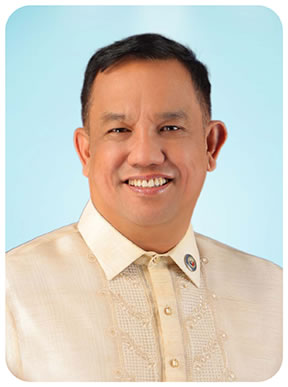
- Official portrait, 2022

Member of the Philippine House of Representatives from Albay's 3rd district
- In office June 30, 2019 – June 30, 2025
- Preceded by: Fernando V. Gonzalez
- Succeeded by: Raymond Adrian E. Salceda

Personal details
- Born: Fernando Tibor Cabredo; May 30, 1973 (age 53) Legazpi, Albay, Philippines
- Party: NUP (2021–present)
- Other political affiliations: PDP–Laban (2018–2021)

Fernando Tibor Cabredo (born May 30, 1973) is a Filipino politician. He served as a member of the Philippine House of Representatives representing the 3rd District of Albay from 2019 to 2025.

== Political career ==
In 2022, Cabredo was re-elected after winning unopposed in the 3rd District of Albay.

== Electoral history ==
=== 2022 ===
2022 Philippine House of Representatives elections
Party	Candidate	Votes	%
NUP	Fernando Cabredo	165,111	100.00
Total votes		165,111	100.00
NUP hold			

=== 2019 ===
2019 Philippine House of Representatives elections
Party	Candidate	Votes	%
PDP–Laban	Fernando Cabredo	107,384	52.18
NPC	Reno Lim	88,745	43.12
Independent	Mario Marcos	8,344	4.05
Independent	Elmer Felix Pornel	1,316	0.63
Margin of victory		18,639	9.06
Invalid or blank votes		30,776	
Total votes		237,284	
PDP–Laban hold			
