= Oas, Albay =

Municipality in Albay, Philippines

Oas
- Municipality
- Municipality of Oas
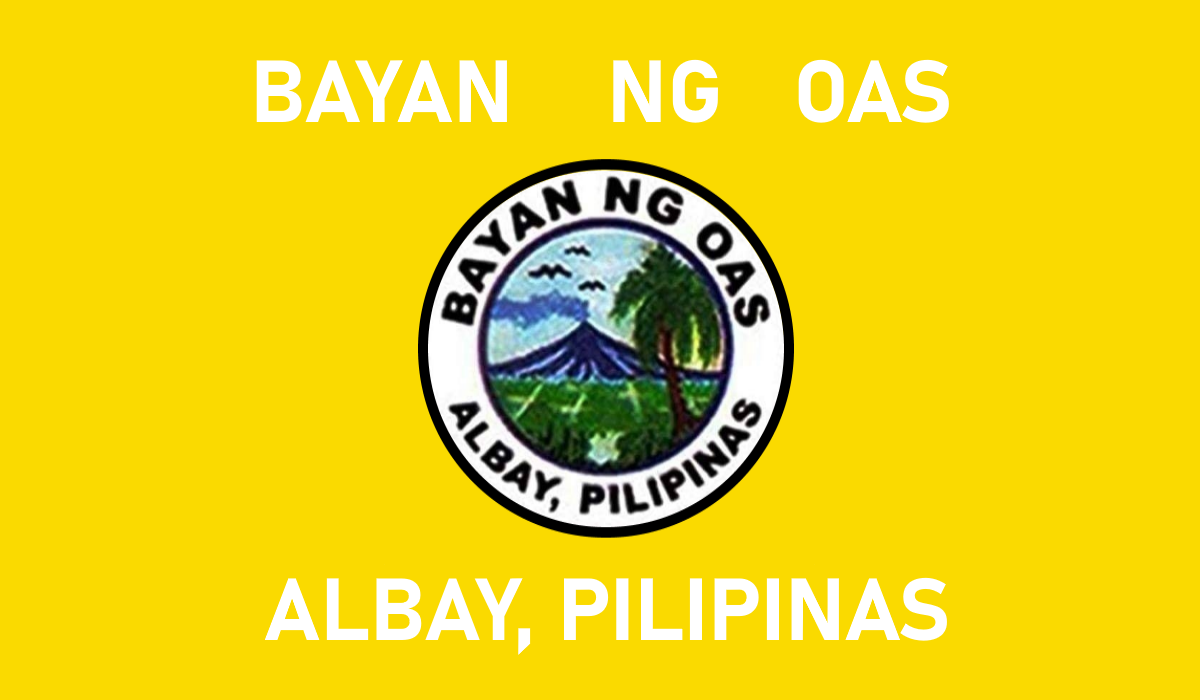
- Flag

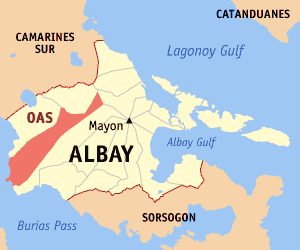
- Map of Albay with Oas highlighted
- Interactive map of Oas
- Location within the Philippines
- Coordinates: 13°15′32″N 123°29′43″E
- Country: Philippines
- Region: Bicol Region
- Province: Albay
- District: 3rd district
- Founded: 1605
- Barangays: 53 (see Barangays)

Government
  - Type: Sangguniang Bayan
  - Mayor: John Kenneth M. Trinidad.
  - Vice Mayor: Domingo R. Escoto
  - Representative: Raymond Adrian Salceda
  - Municipal Council: Members: Allen Rivera; Bryan Bustamante; Junpale Yunchongco; Robert N. Arevalo; Manrox Rendor; Nensus Reblando; Arvin Gregg R. Ricarte; Noel Brijuega
  - Electorate: 44,774 voters (2025)

Area
  - Total: 263.61 km^{2} (101.78 sq mi)
- Elevation: 47 m (154 ft)
- Highest elevation: 319 m (1,047 ft)
- Lowest elevation: 17 m (56 ft)

Population (2024 census)
  - Total: 64,890
  - Density: 246.2/km^{2} (637.5/sq mi)
  - Households: 15,198

Economy
  - Income class: 1st municipal income class
  - Poverty incidence: 29.68% (2023)
  - Revenue: ₱ 326.2 million (2024)
  - Assets: ₱ 1,439 million (2024)
  - Expenditure: ₱ 222.2 million (2024)
  - Liabilities: ₱ 304.4 million (2024)

Service provider
  - Electricity: Albay Electric Cooperative (ALECO)
- Time zone: UTC+8 (PST)
- IDD : area code: +63 (0)52
- Native languages: Central Bikol; Tagalog
- Catholic diocese: Diocese of Legazpi

Oas, officially the Municipality of Oas (Central Bikol: Banwaan kan Oas; West Miraya Bikol: Banwaan nin Oas; Filipino: Bayan ng Oas), is a municipality in the province of Albay, Philippines. According to the 2024 census, it has a population of 64,890 people.

== Etymology ==
There are two stories that purport to tell the origin of the name of Oas:

a) There is a dam across the narrowest portion of a local river. This dam solely irrigates the vast fields of the place including those of the nearby town of Libon and results in a good harvest. People are wary of any cracks or leaks on the dam walls during months of heavy rains. A crier would shout nawaswas, giving the call to the people (in times of this kind of emergency) for immediate action in groups. From then on, the natives coined this name for the place and later shortened it to present form.

b) Early Spanish colonizers reaching this particular section of the Bicol Peninsula asked the name of the place from the about 600 natives living there, "Como se llama este sitio?" The natives mistakenly thought the question to be "Onan kading lugar kadi, maiwas?" ("What place is this, it's very big?") in their native language. In response, the natives answered, "Si, señores. Labi nikading iwas. Labi nikading iwas." ("Yes, sirs, this is grand and spacious".) From then on the early Spanish colonizers adopted in their official census the existence of "a rich fertile valley with verdant fields of grain" which is the little town of Oas in Bicol.

== History ==
=== Foundation ===
Oas was founded during the early Spanish colonization of the Bicol Peninsula. In 1605, Father Baltazar de los Reyes converted 12 leading natives of the area to Christianity in one day, forming the foundation of the community now known as Oas.

=== During the Marcos dictatorship ===
The town was one of the localities particularly harmed by the Dictatorship of Ferdinand Marcos; in the waning days of the dictatorship, Oas was hit by a series of political killings targeting those who dared to speak out against the abuses of the Military and against Ferdinand Marcos.

The most prominent of the victims was Clemente Ragragio, the municipal sanitation inspector of Ligao who was later also assigned to Oas. Known for his effectiveness, he had been awarded the 1983 Best Sanitary Inspector for Albay. However, this led the dictatorship's local administrators suspecting him of being a rebel sympathizer, because his close relationship with locals in far-flung barangays allowed him to move around fearlessly, and because he expressed disagreements with the dictatorship's governance. A killer shot him three times in front of his house in the early evening of August 21, 1985, and the government did not investigate his murder. He was later honored by having his name inscribed on the wall of remembrance at the Philippines' Bantayog ng mga Bayani (lit. Monument of Heroes), which honors the martyrs and heroes who fought to restore democracy in the wake of the Marcos dictatorship.

=== Recent history ===
Oas has been in the news several times in recent years due to the achievements of its outstanding citizens, notably chess prodigy Bince Rafael Operiano who topped the under-10 age category at the 6th Eastern Asia Youth Chess Championship in Bangkok in 2022, and Miss Universe 2018 Catriona Gray whose maternal lineage has its roots in Oas.

== Geography ==
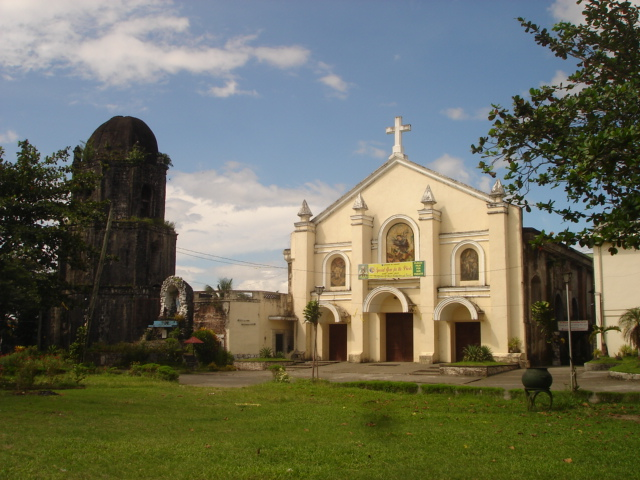
The Oas Catholic Church

Oas is located at 13°15′32″N 123°29′43″E.

According to the Philippine Statistics Authority, the municipality has a land area of 263.61 square kilometres (101.78 sq mi) constituting 10.23% of the 2,575.77-square-kilometre- (994.51 sq mi) total area of Albay.

Oas is 32 kilometres (20 mi) from Legazpi City and 495 kilometres (308 mi) from Manila.

=== Barangays ===
Oas is politically subdivided into 53 barangays. Each barangay consists of puroks and some have sitios.

PSGC	Barangay	Population			±% p.a.	
		2024		2010		
050512001	Badbad	1.0%	622	583	▴	0.45%
050512002	Badian	4.1%	2,681	2,348	▴	0.92%
050512003	Bagsa	1.3%	862	764	▴	0.83%
050512004	Bagumbayan	1.4%	879	1,018	▾	−1.01%
050512005	Balogo	8.1%	5,236	3,897	▴	2.06%
050512008	Banao	0.7%	470	562	▾	−1.22%
050512009	Bangiawon	1.4%	910	785	▴	1.02%
050512011	Bogtong	0.6%	367	351	▴	0.31%
050512010	Bongoran	2.8%	1,816	1,741	▴	0.29%
050512012	Busac	3.2%	2,079	1,939	▴	0.48%
050512013	Cadawag	0.7%	485	427	▴	0.88%
050512014	Cagmanaba	5.1%	3,305	3,039	▴	0.58%
050512015	Calaguimit	1.3%	867	865	▴	0.02%
050512016	Calpi	2.1%	1,335	1,224	▴	0.60%
050512017	Calzada	1.4%	911	1,029	▾	−0.84%
050512018	Camagong	1.8%	1,167	1,146	▴	0.13%
050512019	Casinagan	1.0%	617	530	▴	1.05%
050512020	Centro Poblacion	0.3%	225	277	▾	−1.42%
050512021	Coliat	1.1%	723	717	▴	0.06%
050512022	Del Rosario	1.1%	733	624	▴	1.12%
050512023	Gumabao	1.2%	793	865	▾	−0.60%
050512024	Ilaor Norte	2.3%	1,495	1,525	▾	−0.14%
050512025	Ilaor Sur	3.4%	2,202	2,275	▾	−0.22%
050512026	Iraya Norte	3.1%	1,982	1,909	▴	0.26%
050512027	Iraya Sur	1.2%	779	711	▴	0.63%
050512028	Manga	3.6%	2,322	2,146	▴	0.54%
050512029	Maporong	1.8%	1,184	1,107	▴	0.46%
050512030	Maramba	5.1%	3,301	3,114	▴	0.40%
050512032	Matambo	0.8%	489	435	▴	0.81%
050512033	Mayag	0.7%	452	507	▾	−0.79%
050512034	Mayao	2.5%	1,618	1,514	▴	0.46%
050512031	Moroponros	0.6%	357	283	▴	1.61%
050512035	Nagas	2.5%	1,631	1,665	▾	−0.14%
050512037	Obaliw-Rinas	2.3%	1,504	1,401	▴	0.49%
050512038	Pistola	1.7%	1,135	1,101	▴	0.21%
050512039	Ramay	1.1%	734	724	▴	0.09%
050512040	Rizal (Rabak)	1.3%	864	892	▾	−0.22%
050512041	Saban	2.9%	1,908	1,875	▴	0.12%
050512042	San Agustin	2.0%	1,285	1,240	▴	0.25%
050512043	San Antonio (Linintian)	1.4%	939	938	▴	0.01%
050512044	San Isidro (Tabuguk)	2.4%	1,529	1,400	▴	0.61%
050512045	San Jose (Badongay)	1.1%	744	759	▾	−0.14%
050512046	San Juan	2.3%	1,503	1,390	▴	0.54%
050512047	San Miguel (Mangayaw)	1.2%	772	792	▾	−0.18%
050512036	San Pascual (Nale)	1.3%	841	743	▴	0.86%
050512049	San Ramon	2.6%	1,710	1,657	▴	0.22%
050512050	San Vicente (Suca)	1.4%	938	1,046	▾	−0.75%
050512056	Tablon	1.4%	940	903	▴	0.28%
050512051	Talisay	1.2%	777	693	▴	0.79%
050512052	Talongog	1.8%	1,198	1,144	▴	0.32%
050512053	Tapel	2.8%	1,810	1,371	▴	1.93%
050512054	Tobgon	2.5%	1,649	1,517	▴	0.58%
050512055	Tobog	2.0%	1,313	1,277	▴	0.19%
	Total		64,890	64,785	▴	0.01%

=== Climate ===
Climate data for Oas, Albay
Month	Jan	Feb	Mar	Apr	May	Jun	Jul	Aug	Sep	Oct	Nov	Dec	Year
Mean daily maximum °C (°F)	27 (81)	28 (82)	29 (84)	31 (88)	31 (88)	30 (86)	29 (84)	29 (84)	29 (84)	29 (84)	29 (84)	28 (82)	29 (84)
Mean daily minimum °C (°F)	22 (72)	22 (72)	22 (72)	23 (73)	25 (77)	25 (77)	25 (77)	25 (77)	25 (77)	24 (75)	23 (73)	23 (73)	24 (75)
Average precipitation mm (inches)	55 (2.2)	36 (1.4)	45 (1.8)	42 (1.7)	114 (4.5)	184 (7.2)	245 (9.6)	224 (8.8)	238 (9.4)	171 (6.7)	130 (5.1)	94 (3.7)	1,578 (62.1)
Average rainy days	13.0	9.5	11.8	12.7	21.3	25.3	28.3	26.5	26.4	24.2	19.9	16.1	235
Source: Meteoblue

== Demographics ==
Population census of Oas
Year	Pop.	±% p.a.
1903	11,393	—
1918	16,488	+2.49%
1939	23,131	+1.63%
1948	27,824	+2.07%
1960	36,095	+2.19%
1970	47,952	+2.88%
1975	50,293	+0.96%
1980	52,269	+0.77%
1990	53,061	+0.15%
1995	56,536	+1.20%
2000	62,063	+2.02%
2007	63,888	+0.40%
2010	64,785	+0.51%
2015	67,960	+0.92%
2020	66,084	−0.59%
2024	64,890	−0.44%
Source: Philippine Statistics Authority

In the 2024 census, Oas had a population of 64,890 people. The population density was 250 inhabitants per square kilometre (650/sq mi).

== Economy ==
Poverty incidence of Oas (%)

Source: Philippine Statistics Authority

== Government ==
=== Elected officials ===
2025–2028 Oas Municipal Officials
Position	Name	Party
Mayor	John Kenneth Trinidad. +	NUP
Vice Mayor	Domingo Escoto Jr. +	Lakas
Councilors	Allen Grem Rivera +	Lakas
Councilors	Brayan Bustamante +	NUP
Councilors	Antonio Pale Yuchongco +	Independent
Councilors	Robert N. Arevalo ‹›	Lakas
Councilors	Manrox Rendor +	Lakas
Councilors	Nensus Reblando +	Lakas
Councilors	Arvin Gregg R. Ricarte ‹›	Independent
Councilors	Noel Brijuega ‹›	Lakas
Ex Officio Municipal Council Members
ABC President	Joseph Rentosa (San Isidro)	Nonpartisan
SK Federation President	Kyle Escalada (Rizal)	Nonpartisan

Legend
1. A + indicates that the official is elected for the first term
2. A ♯ indicates that the official is re-elected to a higher position
3. A ‹› indicates that the official is re-elected to the same position

=== Past Municipal Administrators ===
Spanish Era (1734–1898)
Inclusive years	Gobernadorcillo
1734	Don Roque Samco
1735	Don Juan Pendor
1736	Don Francisco Sanglitan
1737	Don Pedro Lagñitnon
1738	Don Juan Pendor
1739	Don Jose de Villafuerte
1740	Don Gregorio Aguilar
1741	Don Jose de Villafuerte
1742	Don Domingo Martinez
1743	Don Francisco Roque
1744	Don Bernardo Torog
1745	Don Francisco Romba
1746	Don Manuel Montañez
1747-1748	Don Diego Langcauon
1749-1751	Don Pedro de Valenzuela
1752	Don Francisco Roque
1753	Don Pascual Sumba
1754	Don Antonio Mariano
1755	Don Pedro de Valenzuela
1756	Don Domingo de la Cruz
1757	Don Pedro de Valenzuela
1758	Don Pascual de la Cruz
1759	Don Manuel de Sacramento
1760	Don Ambrocio Doynog
1761	Don Teodoro de S. Lucas
1762	Don Atilano de S. Miguel
1763	Don Pedro de Valenzuela
1764	Don Manuel de S. Esteban
1765	Don Gaspar Triquero
1766	Don Francisco Javier
1767	Don Manuel de Espiritu Sto.
1768	Don Gregorio de la Presentacion
1769	Don Alonso Daiton
1770	Don Juan Bagamasbad
1771	Don Andres Tuason
1772	Don Manuel Salvador
1773	Don Miguel Geronimo Lacob
1774	Don Pedro de Valenzuela
1775-1777	Don Francisco Javier
1778	Don Alejandro de S. Buenaventura
1779	Don Miguel Geronimo Lacob
1780	Don Juan Rafael de los Reyes
1781	Don Domingo Bruno
1782	Don Francisco Javier
1783	Don Miguel Geronimo Lacob
1784	Don Francisco Bagamasbad
1785	Don Jose de la Cruz
1786	Don Pedro S. Juan
1787	Don Domingo Langcauon
1788	Don Pascual de la Navidad
1789	Don Miguel Geronimo Lacob
1790	Don Miguel S. Pedro
1791	Don Juan Sto. Domingo
1792	Don Antonio de la Cruz
1793	Don Miguel Geronimo Lacob
1794	Don Juan Sto. Domingo
1795	Don Domingo S. Nicolas
1796	Don Francisco Ferrer
1797	Don Juan Sto. Domingo
1798	Don Andres S. Fernando
1799	Don Juan Pinpin de Vera
1800	Don Domingo S. Nicolas
1801	Don Francisco S. Buenaventura
1802	Don Pedro S. Casimiro
1803	Don Tomas de Jesus
1804	Don Domingo S. Nicolas
1805	Don Ricardo Sto. Domingo
1806	Don Fernando de la Resurreccion
1807	Don Antonio Florentino
1808	Don Juan de la Soledad
1809	Don Domingo S. Nicolas
1810	Don Gaspar Florencio
1811	Don Juan de los Santos
1812	Don Ricardo Sto. Domingo
1813	Don Mariano S. Nicomedes
1814	Don Pascual S. Antonio
1815	Don Ludovico S. Bailo
1816	Don Serrano Marquez
1817	Don Bernardo Nicolas
1818	Don Pascual Conrade
1819	Don Juan de la Navidad
1820	Don Francisco Langcauon
1821	Don Juan Portacio
1822	Don Francisco Langcauon
1823	Don Juan Abad
1824	Don Fabiano Crisostomo
1825-1826	Don Francisco Langcauon
1827	Don Pedro Rafael
1828	Don Ricardo Sto. Domingo
1829	Don Exeario Domingo Nepomuceno
1830	Don Juan Perez
1831	Don Juan Langcauon
1832	Don Vicente Pendor
1833	Don Mariano Benequillo
1834	Don Pascual S. Lazaro
1835	Don Bernardo S. Francisco
1836	Don Santiago Andaya
1837	Don Juan Espinosa
1838	Don Pedro Lorenzo S. Miguel
1839	Don Andres del Espiritu Sto.
1840	Don Santiago Bernardo
1841	Don Exeario Domingo Nepomuceno
1842	Don Bernardo S. Juan
1843	Don Clemente Azanza
1844	Don Vicente S. Fernando
1845	Don Pascual Silvestre
1846	Don Pedro Bagol
1847	Don Manuel Mancera
1848	Don Alejandro Pagdato
1849	Don Rufino Raña
1850	Don Francisco Bonifacio Sang
1851	Don Jose Ralla S. Ramon
1852	Don Leocadio Rafael
1853	Don Antonio Real S. Fernando
1854	Don Geronimo Andaya
1855	Don Cornelio Gumba
1856	Don Antonio Real S. Fernando
1857	Don Estanislao Rafael
1858	Don Mariano Realco
1859	Don Camilo Romualdo
1860	Don Pascual Bustamante
1861	Don Cayetano Real S. Fernando
1862	Don Pedro Radorez
1863-1864	Don Francisco Rellante
1865-1866	Don Romualdo Azanza
1867	Don Juan Rebusi
1868-1869	Don Francisco Rellante
1870-1871	Don Manuel Realista
1872-1873	Don Guido Recato
1874-1875	Don Margarito Ragos
1876-1877	Don Juan Rebusi
1878-1879	Don Ambrosio R.S. Ramon
1880-1882	Don Ciriaco Damian
1883-1884	Don Jose G. Camposano
1885-1888	Don Mariano Romero
1889-1890	Don Bartolome Roa
1891	Don Mariano Austero
1892	Don Crispin Q. Roa
1893-1894	Don Mariano Rebueno
1895-1898	Don Jose Ribaya

Republica Filipina (1898-1900)
Inclusive years	Municipal president
1898-1899	Guido Recato (Appointed by Gen. Emilio Aguinaldo)
1899-1900	Bartolome Roa (Appointed by Gen. Emilio Aguinaldo)

American rule (1900–1941)
Inclusive years	Municipal president
1900–1901	Mariano Rebueno
1901–1903	A. Austero
1904-1905	A. Redillas
1906-1909	R. Realista
1910-1912	Luis Romano
1913-1916	Juan Rayala II
1917-1919	Crispin Rayala
1920-1922	Manuel Bustamante
1923-1925	Crispin Rayala
1926-1928	Dalmacio Ras
1929-1931	Alfredo Q. Roa
1932-1938	Marcial R. Ras
1938-1941	Virgilio Rempillo
1941	Alfredo Q. Roa (Elected but did not assume office, due to Japanese Invasion in December 12, 1941)

Japanese Occupation (1942–1947)
Inclusive years	Municipal Mayor
1941-1942	Reginaldo Torres (Japanese Appointed)
1943-1945	Pedro Eva (Japanese Appointed)

Post-War Period (1945-date)
Inclusive years	Municipal Mayor	Municipal Vice Mayor	SK Federation President	ABC President	Remarks
September 29, 1945 – December 11, 1945	Amando Ramin				Acting Mayor, Appointed by Pres. Sergio Osmeña
December 11, 1945 – June 28, 1946	Pedro Eva				Appointed by Pres. Sergio Osmeña
June 28, 1946 – December 31, 1947	Temistocles Raguero				Appointed by Pres. Manuel Roxas
January 1, 1948 – 1951	Temistocles Raguero				
1952-1955	Pedro Eva				
1956-1959	Temistocles Raguero				
1960-1971	Jose R. Ricarte				
1971-1986	Marcial R. Bustamante				
1986–1992	Jose R. Ricarte				Appointed Mayor by Pres. Corazon Aquino
1992-1995	Dr. Jesus Rances				
1995	Salvador R. Rendor	Gader Rellama			Died in Office
1995-2001	Gader B. Rellama				Assume the office of Mayor, after the death of Mayor Rendor (1995), Established the Oas Community College
2001–2007	Jesus R. Reario, II				
2007-2016	Gregorio H. Ricarte				
2016-2025	Domingo R. Escoto, Jr				Incumbent Mayor
Term starts on June 30, 2025	John Kenneth M. Trindad	Domingo R. Escoto			Mayor Elect

== Education ==
There are two schools district offices which govern all educational institutions within the municipality. They oversee the management and operations of all private and public, from primary to secondary schools. These are the:

- Oas North Schools District
- Oas South Schools District

=== Primary and elementary schools ===
- Badbad Elementary School
- Badian Elementary School
- Balogo East Elementary School
- Balogo West Elementary School
- Banao Elementary School
- Bangiawon Elementary School
- Bogtong Elementary School
- Busac Elementary School
- Cadawag Elementary School
- Cagmanaba Elementary School
- Calaguimit Elementary School
- Calpi Elementary School
- Camagong Elementary School
- Casinagan Elementary School
- Celestino B. Redito Elementary School
- Coliat Elementary School
- Del Rosario Elementary School
- Divine Mercy Science Oriented School
- Grace Christian Mission Technical School
- Gumabao Elementary School
- Manga Elementary School
- Maporong Elementary School
- Maramba Elementary School
- Marian Formation Centers
- Matambo Elementary School
- Mayag Elementary School
- Moroponros Elementary School
- Nagas Elementary School
- Oas Community College
- Oas East Central School
- Oas North Central School
- Oas South Central School
- Our Lady of the Roses Montessori Learning Center
- Ramay Elementary School
- Saban Elementary School
- San Agustin Elementary School
- San Antonio Elementary School
- San Isidro Elementary School
- San Jose Elementary School
- San Juan Elementary School
- San Pascual Elementary School
- San Ramon Elementary School
- San Vicente Elementary School
- Tablon Elementary School
- Talisay Elementary School
- Tapel Elementary School
- Tobgon Elementary School
- Tobog Elementary School

=== Secondary schools ===
- Balogo High School
- Manuel Andaya Bustamante High School
- Maramba National High School
- Oas Polytechnic School
- Saban National High School
- Sabino Rebagay Memorial High School
- Saint Michael's Academy (Junior High School)
- Saint Michael's Academy (Senior High School)
- San Juan High School
- San Miguel High School
- Tobog High School

== Notable personalities ==
- David Nepomuceno - 1924 Olympian, first Filipino to compete in the Olympics
- Catriona Gray - Miss Universe 2018
