= Pio Duran =

Municipality in Albay, Philippines

Pio Duran Malacbalac
- Municipality
- Municipality of Pio Duran
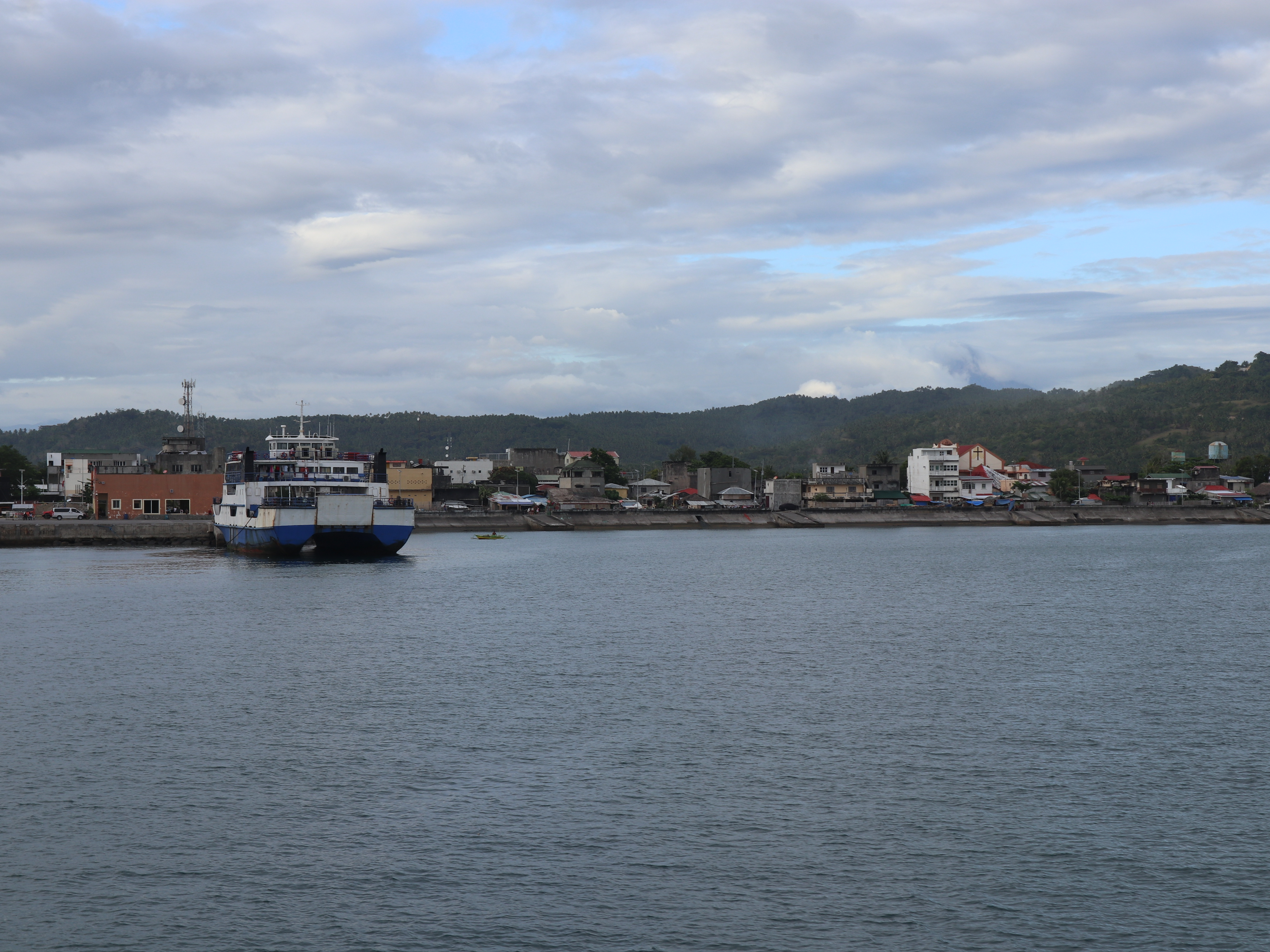

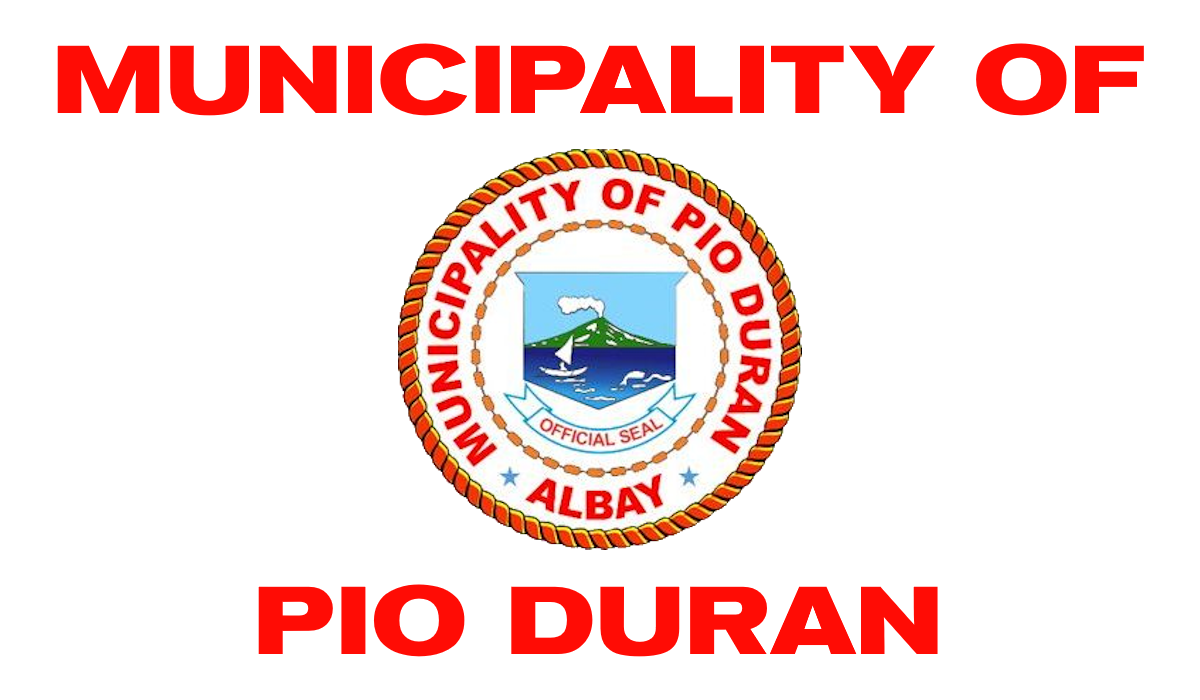
- Flag Seal

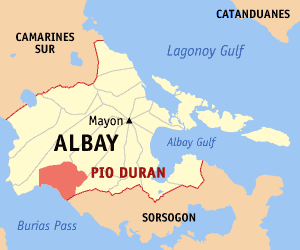
- Map of Albay with Pio Duran highlighted
- Interactive map of Pio Duran
- Location within the Philippines
- Coordinates: 13°02′N 123°27′E
- Country: Philippines
- Region: Bicol Region
- Province: Albay
- District: 3rd district
- Named for: Pio Saceda Duran
- Barangays: 33 (see Barangays)

Government
  - Type: Sangguniang Bayan
  - Mayor: Evangeline Arandia
  - Vice Mayor: Henry Callope
  - Representative: Adrian Salceda
  - Municipal Council: Members: Delia M. Napa; Karen Joy Y. Moya; Rhudy M. Apuli; Gina P. Elorde; Mary June R. Malgapo; Bon Edward A. Barnido; Jonathan P. Acoyado; Pedro C. de Luna IV
  - Electorate: 34,500 voters (2025)

Area
  - Total: 133.70 km^{2} (51.62 sq mi)
- Elevation: 51 m (167 ft)
- Highest elevation: 296 m (971 ft)
- Lowest elevation: 0 m (0 ft)

Population (2024 census)
  - Total: 48,713
  - Density: 364.35/km^{2} (943.65/sq mi)
  - Households: 10,813
- Demonym: Pioduranon/ Malacbalacnon

Economy
  - Income class: 1st municipal income class
  - Poverty incidence: 35.37% (2023)
  - Revenue: ₱161.420 million (2020)
  - Assets: ₱475.914 million (2020)
  - Expenditure: ₱167.684 million (2020)
  - Liabilities: ₱55.494 million (2020)

Service provider
  - Electricity: Albay Electric Cooperative (ALECO)
- Time zone: UTC+8 (PST)
- ZIP code: 4516
- PSGC: 0500513000
- IDD : area code: +63 (0)52
- Native languages: Tagalog; Bikol Central
- Catholic diocese: Diocese of Legazpi
- Website: www.pioduran.gov.ph

Pio Duran, officially the Municipality of Pio Duran (Central Bikol: Banwaan kan Pio Duran; West Miraya Bikol: Banwaan nin Pio Duran; Tagalog: Bayan ng Pio Duran), is a municipality in the province of Albay, Philippines. According to the 2024 census, it has a population of 48,713 people.

It is home to Pio Duran Hot Springs, a natural resort known for its warm mineral waters and relaxing atmosphere. Surrounded by lush scenery, it offers a soothing retreat for visitors seeking rest and wellness. The site also provides opportunities for hiking and nature exploration.

== Etymology ==
It was named after the Filipino Pan-Asianist, Lawyer and Legislator, Pio Saceda Duran (1900–1961).

== Geography ==
Pio Duran is located at 13°02′N 123°27′E.

According to the Philippine Statistics Authority, the municipality has a land area of 133.70 square kilometres (51.62 sq mi) constituting 5.19% of the 2,575.77-square-kilometre- (994.51 sq mi) total area of Albay. Pio Duran is 66 kilometres (41 mi) from Legazpi City and 539 kilometres (335 mi) from Manila.

=== Barangays ===
Pio Duran is politically subdivided into 33 barangays. Each barangay consists of puroks and some have sitios.

PSGC	Barangay	Population			±% p.a.	
		2024		2010		
050513002	Alabangpuro	1.7%	835	831	▴	0.03%
050513005	Banawan (Binawan)	6.6%	3,235	3,149	▴	0.19%
050513023	Barangay I (Poblacion)	8.4%	4,070	4,048	▴	0.04%
050513024	Barangay II (Poblacion)	3.7%	1,796	1,710	▴	0.34%
050513025	Barangay III (Poblacion)	2.0%	986	1,075	▾	−0.59%
050513026	Barangay IV (Poblacion)	3.0%	1,472	1,637	▾	−0.73%
050513027	Barangay V (Poblacion)	4.8%	2,362	2,177	▴	0.56%
050513003	Basicao Coastal	4.7%	2,300	2,333	▾	−0.10%
050513004	Basicao Interior	1.2%	599	499	▴	1.26%
050513006	Binodegahan	5.2%	2,517	2,319	▴	0.56%
050513007	Buenavista	2.6%	1,247	1,153	▴	0.54%
050513008	Buyo	0.9%	452	422	▴	0.47%
050513009	Caratagan	9.3%	4,536	4,049	▴	0.78%
050513010	Cuyaoyao	3.3%	1,618	1,616	▴	0.01%
050513011	Flores	2.9%	1,410	1,318	▴	0.46%
050513033	La Medalla	3.8%	1,837	1,647	▴	0.75%
050513012	Lawinon	2.6%	1,280	1,260	▴	0.11%
050513013	Macasitas	1.0%	508	472	▴	0.51%
050513014	Malapay	2.2%	1,087	1,035	▴	0.34%
050513015	Malidong	4.2%	2,062	2,041	▴	0.07%
050513016	Mamlad	1.0%	503	483	▴	0.28%
050513017	Marigondon	3.2%	1,562	1,489	▴	0.33%
050513018	Matanglad	1.4%	681	655	▴	0.27%
050513019	Nablangbulod	1.3%	657	689	▾	−0.33%
050513020	Oringon	1.4%	667	655	▴	0.12%
050513021	Palapas	2.4%	1,181	1,109	▴	0.43%
050513022	Panganiran	1.3%	621	586	▴	0.40%
050513028	Rawis	1.8%	875	772	▴	0.86%
050513029	Salvacion	1.3%	621	552	▴	0.81%
050513030	Santo Cristo	0.9%	451	398	▴	0.86%
050513031	Sukip	1.8%	868	839	▴	0.23%
050513032	Tibabo	1.4%	662	770	▾	−1.03%
	Total		48,713	45,028	▴	0.54%

=== Climate ===
Climate data for Pio Duran, Albay
Month	Jan	Feb	Mar	Apr	May	Jun	Jul	Aug	Sep	Oct	Nov	Dec	Year
Mean daily maximum °C (°F)	27 (81)	28 (82)	29 (84)	31 (88)	31 (88)	30 (86)	29 (84)	29 (84)	29 (84)	29 (84)	29 (84)	28 (82)	29 (84)
Mean daily minimum °C (°F)	22 (72)	21 (70)	22 (72)	23 (73)	24 (75)	25 (77)	25 (77)	25 (77)	24 (75)	24 (75)	23 (73)	22 (72)	23 (74)
Average precipitation mm (inches)	65 (2.6)	44 (1.7)	42 (1.7)	39 (1.5)	87 (3.4)	150 (5.9)	184 (7.2)	153 (6.0)	163 (6.4)	154 (6.1)	127 (5.0)	100 (3.9)	1,308 (51.4)
Average rainy days	13.9	9.2	11.1	12.5	19.6	24.3	26.5	25.0	25.5	24.4	19.4	15.1	226.5
Source: Meteoblue

== Demographics ==
Population census of Pio Duran
Year	Pop.	±% p.a.
1970	26,443	—
1975	31,188	+3.37%
1980	33,835	+1.64%
1990	36,859	+0.86%
1995	41,850	+2.41%
2000	44,423	+1.29%
2007	44,972	+0.17%
2010	45,028	+0.05%
2015	46,693	+0.69%
2020	49,070	+1.05%
2024	48,713	−0.18%
Source: Philippine Statistics Authority

In the 2024 census, Pio Duran had a population of 48,713 people. The population density was 360 inhabitants per square kilometre (930/sq mi).

== Economy ==
Poverty incidence of Pio Duran (%)

Source: Philippine Statistics Authority

== Transportation ==
Access to the town is via Ligao. It is considered one of the major route going to Masbate.

== Education ==
There are two schools district offices which govern all educational institutions within the municipality. They oversee the management and operations of all private and public, from primary to secondary schools. These are the:

- Pio Duran East Schools District
- Pio Duran West Schools District

=== Primary and elementary schools ===
- Agol Elementary School
- Alabangpuro Elementary School
- Balinad Elementary School
- Basicao Coastal Elementary School
- Basicao Interior Elementary School
- Binodegahan Elementary School
- BUENAVISTA Elementary School
- Buyo Elementary School
- Cagbatano Elementary School
- Cuyaoyao Elementary School
- Don Jose Pavia Central School
- Dr. Sofronio B. Garcia Elementary School
- Flores Elementary School
- La Medalla Elementary School
- Lagaan Elementary School
- Lawinon Elementary School
- Macasitas Elementary School
- Malapay Elementary School
- Malidong Elementary School
- Mamlad Elementary School
- Marigondon Elementary School
- Matanglad Elementary School
- Nablangbulod Elementary School
- ORINGON ELEMENTARY SCHOOL
- Panganiran Elementary School
- Pioduran Adventist Multi-Grade School
- Pioduran East Central School
- Pioduran West Central School
- Rawis Elementary School
- Salvacion Elementary School
- San Lorenzo Academy
- Sto. Cristo Elementary School
- Sukip Elementary School
- Tibabo Elementary School

=== Secondary schools ===
- Alabangpuro High School
- Flores Institute
- La Medalla High School
- Malapay High School
- Malidong High School
- Marigondon National High School
- Pioduran National High School

=== Higher educational institution ===
- West Coast College

== Notable personalities ==
- Jona Viray
