= Reno Lim =

Filipino politician

Reno G. Lim (born April 19, 1960) is a Filipino politician. A member of the Lakas-Kampi-CMD (and formerly of the Nationalist People's Coalition), he was elected as a Member of the House of Representatives, representing the 3rd District of Albay beginning in 2007. He is married to Rosalinda and has two children with her, Ronwell and Rochelle. He ran for re-election but lost to ex-governor Fernando Gonzalez. He filed for his opponent's disqualification, and won the case, albeit Gonzalez appealed to the COMELEC.

House of Representatives of the Philippines
Preceded by Joey Salceda	Representative, 3rd District of Albay; 2007–2010	Succeeded by Fernando V. Gonzalez (disputed)
