= Jovellar =

Municipality in Albay, Philippines

Jovellar Quipia
- Municipality
- Municipality of Jovellar
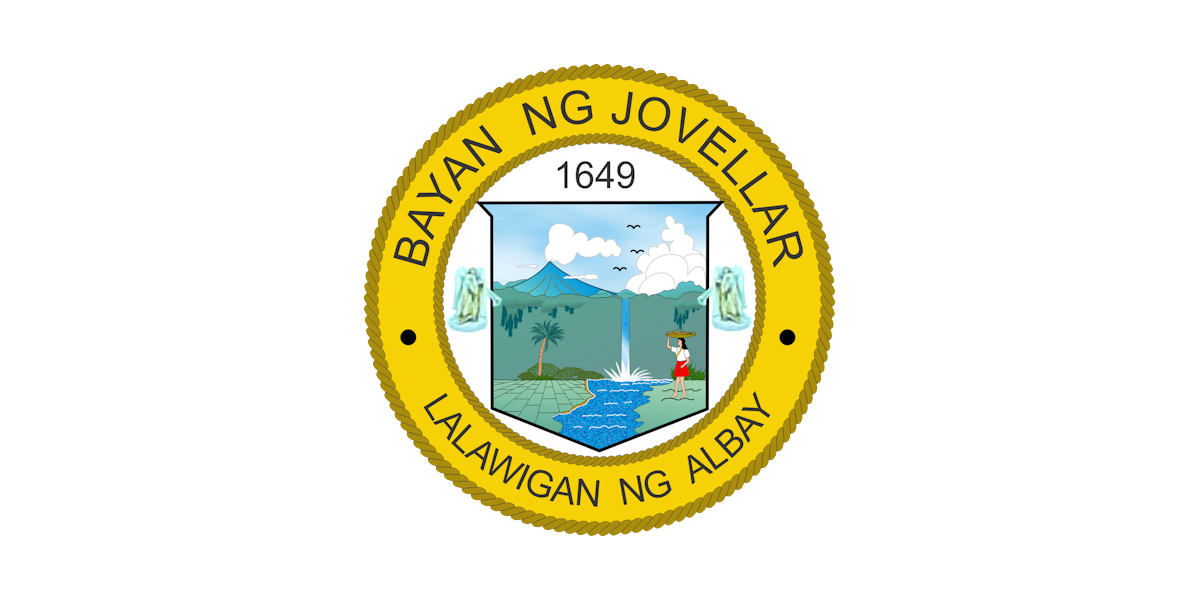
- Flag Seal
- Motto: Andar Jovellar
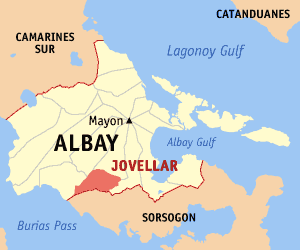
- Map of Albay with Jovellar highlighted
- Interactive map of Jovellar
- Location within the Philippines
- Coordinates: 13°04′N 123°36′E
- Country: Philippines
- Region: Bicol Region
- Province: Albay
- District: 3rd district
- Founded: 1649 (as a Municipal District); 1811 (as the Municipio de Quipia)
- Named for: Joaquín Jovellar y Soler
- Barangays: 23 (see Barangays)

Government
  - Type: Sangguniang Bayan
  - Mayor: Jorem L. Arcangel
  - Vice Mayor: Cezar C. Arellano
  - Representative: Raymond Adrian E. Salceda
  - Municipal Council: Members: Alejandro O. Enciso; Esther Gaile B. Nobleza; Joseph L. Arcangel; Melinda R. Quirona; Digna N. Quintano; Jonathan N. Mortega; Mercuria O. Salomon; Jason L. Arcangel
  - Electorate: 12,455 voters (2025)

Area
  - Total: 105.40 km^{2} (40.70 sq mi)
- Elevation: 92 m (302 ft)
- Highest elevation: 208 m (682 ft)
- Lowest elevation: 17 m (56 ft)

Population (2024 census)
  - Total: 17,538
  - Density: 166.39/km^{2} (430.96/sq mi)
  - Households: 4,161
- Demonym: Jovellareño or Quipianon

Economy
  - Income class: 4th municipal income class
  - Poverty incidence: 36.03% (2023)
  - Revenue: ₱ 119.8 million (2024)
  - Assets: ₱ 364.7 million (2024)
  - Expenditure: ₱ 99.89 million (2024)
  - Liabilities: ₱ 44.13 million (2024)

Service provider
  - Electricity: Albay Electric Cooperative (ALECO)
  - Water: Jovellar Water District
  - Telecommunications: Converge, DCTV
- Time zone: UTC+8 (PST)
- ZIP code: 4515
- PSGC: 0500505000
- IDD : area code: +63 (0)52
- Native languages: Tagalog, East Miraya
- Feast date: August 29
- Catholic diocese: Diocese of Legazpi
- Patron saint: St. John the Baptist

Jovellar, officially the Municipality of Jovellar (Central Bikol: Banwaan kan Jovellar; East Miraya Bikol: Banwaan ning Jovellar; Tagalog: Bayan ng Jovellar), is a municipality in the province of Albay, Philippines. According to the 2024 census, it has a population of 17,538 people, making it the least populated town in the province.

It is known for its Quitinday falls and the underground river which are recognized as the local's version of Cebu's Kawasan Falls and Palawan's underground river. A tourism hotspot that features a cave decorated with stalactites, stalagmites, and different rock formations.

== Etymology ==
The town was named in honor of Spanish governor-general Joaquín Jovellar y Soler.

== History ==
In Year 1572, when the first Spanish Port was established at the western coast of the Bicol Peninsula, Christianization spread-out among the natives and paved the way for the founding of the municipality of Jovellar.

With these developments, the native converts were emboldened to be adventurous and ventured to establish new settlements far out in the region of Bicol Peninsula. Thus, a group from west coast led by a leader popularly known as PIA, sailed upstream of Donsol River and settled in its mouth. There the people in the settlement became economically active by engaging in the gathering of all kinds of forest products like vines, resin, tar, rattan log and wildlife which were sold to dwellers in the west coast. As trade and commerce flourished, more people settled in the place which was later on named as “QUI PIA”. QUI meaning belonging to and PIA as tribute to said adventurous woman.

Succession of political developments saw the evolution of this settlement namely:

1. By Year 1649, this settlement was formally created as a Municipal District under the Ecclesiastical and Civil Jurisdiction of Nueva Caceres bearing the name “Distrito Municipal De Quipia”;

2. On Year 1811, the settlement became a full-pledge town known as “Municipio De Quipia” and became part of the newly created Province of Albay by virtue of a decree of the Governor-General. The first elected Gobernadorcillo was Anastacio de la Peña with only one Year term of the office. The 1818 census showed 269 native families paying tribute and they were coexisting with 33 Spanish-Filipino families. Succession of other gobernadorcillos followed thereafter from year 1812 for several years. Through the influence of a Spanish Resident name Don Cipriano Anduiza the Governor-General by a Decree, declared the name of the place as Jovellar in honor of an illustrious Spanish Captain-General Joaquin Jovellar Y Soler, more popularly known as the father of the infamous head tax called “Cedula Personal”. The title of Gobernadorcillo was changed to “Capitan Municipal” with additional one year term of office. The following year until the end of Spanish Regime, a total of sixteen Capitanes Municipal took turns in the governance of the municipality during the period year 1863 to 1899;

3. During the American Regime the title Capitan Municipal was replaced by “Municipal President”. Thirteen (13) Municipal President were swoon in to local leadership from year 1900 to 1941;

4. The Japanese Occupation proved the resiliency of the people of Jovellar in repulsing this foreign domination through an organized region-wide guerilla unit-Voluntary Army of the United States of America (VAUSA) under the leadership of Mayor Leon Monilla. The Japanese Civil commission appointed Arturo C. Macandog as Town Mayor by way of establishing their own government. Vicente Macandog succeeded as Town Mayor in year 1944 after the untimely demise of Arturo C. Macandog from the hands of a guerilla fanatic;

5. After the end of World War II, Jovellar economy was in shambles when independence was declared on July 4, 1946, where Leon C. Monilla was appointed as Mayor by the American Liberation Force. President Manuel Roxas instead appointed Jose N. Ortega as Town Mayor when civil affairs were restored in Jovellar;

6. During the 1946 election of officials for a four year term, Jose N. Ortega was the first Mayor-elect for Jovellar during the period year 1946 to year 1949. The ensuring election of town Officials saw the rise of politics and succession of leadership in Jovellar with the likes of Tomas C. Pales (1960-1963); Jaime P. Clamar (1964-1967); re-election of Tomas C. Pales in year 1968 until year 1975 when he was succumbed to death while in Office; succession of Vice-Mayor Teodoro Mancera for the unexpired term of Mayor Pales until year 1979; and Mancera until year 1986;

7. The historic People’s Power Revolution n year 1986 gave rise to the appointment of Jose N. Arcangel Jr. as Officer-in-Charge of the municipality. He was elected as Mayor of Jovellar during the year 1988 elections and was re-elected during the year 1992 and 1995 elections;

8. Mayor Antonio A. Herrera succeeded during the year 1998 election, and Jose N. Arcangel Jr. has re-elected again during the year 2001 election; and

9. Hon. Jorem L. Arcangel is now the incumbent Municipal Mayor of Jovellar on the year 2010 election by the popular will of the people.

== Geography ==
Jovellar is located at 13°04′N 123°36′E. Quipia River runs through the town and the river leads all the way to Donsol in Sorsogon.

According to the Philippine Statistics Authority, the municipality has a land area of 105.40 square kilometres (40.70 sq mi) constituting 4.09% of the 2,575.77-square-kilometre- (994.51 sq mi) total area of Albay.

Main access to the town is via Guinobatan. Jeepneys ply the 16-kilometre (9.9 mi) distance from Guinobatan to Jovellar daily with the first trip from Guinobatan leaving as early as 5AM and the last trip to Jovellar usually at around 5PM.

=== Barangays ===
Jovellar is politically subdivided into 23 barangays. Each barangay consists of puroks and some have sitios.

PSGC	Barangay	Population			±% p.a.	
		2024		2010		
050505025	Aurora Poblacion (Barangay 6)	0.7%	126	126	Steady	0.00%
050505003	Bagacay	5.2%	909	968	▾	−0.44%
050505011	Bautista	4.1%	722	794	▾	−0.66%
050505012	Cabraran	8.7%	1,534	1,635	▾	−0.44%
050505008	Calzada Poblacion (Barangay 7)	3.1%	540	532	▴	0.10%
050505013	Del Rosario (Bangkaso)	3.6%	625	687	▾	−0.65%
050505014	Estrella	3.3%	577	672	▾	−1.05%
050505015	Florista	4.8%	850	839	▴	0.09%
050505005	Mabini Poblacion (Barangay 2)	3.0%	532	601	▾	−0.84%
050505007	Magsaysay Poblacion (Barangay 4)	0.8%	144	155	▾	−0.51%
050505016	Mamlad	6.1%	1,067	1,056	▴	0.07%
050505017	Maogog	7.5%	1,318	1,269	▴	0.26%
050505018	Mercado Poblacion (Barangay 5)	1.2%	216	216	Steady	0.00%
050505006	Plaza Poblacion (Barangay 3)	1.3%	220	215	▴	0.16%
050505009	Quitinday Poblacion (Barangay 8)	0.8%	144	182	▾	−1.61%
050505004	Rizal Poblacion (Barangay 1)	1.8%	312	347	▾	−0.74%
050505019	Salvacion (Mabunga)	2.6%	460	424	▴	0.57%
050505020	San Isidro (Mabayawas)	6.9%	1,218	1,163	▴	0.32%
050505021	San Roque (Guibac)	8.9%	1,559	1,564	▾	−0.02%
050505022	San Vicente (Inalom)	12.4%	2,178	2,158	▴	0.06%
050505023	Sinagaran	3.0%	531	523	▴	0.11%
050505024	Villa Paz	4.9%	866	935	▾	−0.53%
050505010	White Deer Poblacion (Barangay 9)	5.1%	887	874	▴	0.10%
	Total		17,538	17,795	▾	−0.10%

=== Climate ===
Climate data for Jovellar, Albay
Month	Jan	Feb	Mar	Apr	May	Jun	Jul	Aug	Sep	Oct	Nov	Dec	Year
Mean daily maximum °C (°F)	27 (81)	28 (82)	29 (84)	31 (88)	31 (88)	30 (86)	29 (84)	29 (84)	29 (84)	29 (84)	29 (84)	28 (82)	29 (84)
Mean daily minimum °C (°F)	22 (72)	21 (70)	22 (72)	23 (73)	24 (75)	25 (77)	25 (77)	25 (77)	24 (75)	24 (75)	23 (73)	22 (72)	23 (74)
Average precipitation mm (inches)	65 (2.6)	44 (1.7)	42 (1.7)	39 (1.5)	87 (3.4)	150 (5.9)	184 (7.2)	153 (6.0)	163 (6.4)	154 (6.1)	127 (5.0)	100 (3.9)	1,308 (51.4)
Average rainy days	13.9	9.2	11.1	12.5	19.6	24.3	26.5	25.0	25.5	24.4	19.4	15.1	226.5
Source: Meteoblue

== Demographics ==
Population census of Jovellar
Year	Pop.	±% p.a.
1903	5,423	—
1918	6,854	+1.57%
1939	9,513	+1.57%
1948	10,308	+0.90%
1960	12,025	+1.29%
1970	14,003	+1.53%
1975	14,121	+0.17%
1980	15,016	+1.24%
1990	14,884	−0.09%
1995	16,876	+2.38%
2000	17,357	+0.60%
2007	17,615	+0.20%
2010	16,899	−1.50%
2015	17,308	+0.46%
2020	17,795	+0.59%
2024	17,538	−0.35%
Source: Philippine Statistics Authority

In the 2024 census, Jovellar had a population of 17,538 people. The population density was 170 inhabitants per square kilometre (440/sq mi).

== Economy ==
Poverty incidence of Jovellar (%)

Source: Philippine Statistics Authority

The town's main industry is agriculture. Primary crops are rice, copra, abaca, and corn.

Tourism activities in the area may include a trip to the river just behind the local school or a trip to Pariaan pool.

Once at the town center, one can find a statue of the national hero, Jose Rizal, and the town church in front of it.

== Government ==
=== Elected officials ===
2025–2028 Jovellar Municipal Officials
Position	Name	Party
Mayor	Jorem L. Arcangel ‹›	NUP
Vice Mayor	Cezar C. Arellano ‹›	NUP
Councilors	Esther Gaile B. Nobleza ‹›	Lakas
Councilors	Mercuria O. Salomon ‹›	NUP
Councilors	Melinda R. Quirona ‹›	NUP
Councilors	Alejandro O. Enciso, Jr ‹›	Lakas
Councilors	Joseph L. Arcangel ‹›	Independent
Councilors	Nadier P. Tolosa, Jr +	NUP
Councilors	Zandro O. Gomez +	NUP
Councilors	Michael A. Anzano +	Lakas
Ex Officio Municipal Council Members
ABC President	Tristan Elliot M. Arcangel (Mercado)	Nonpartisan
SK Federation President	Irish Marie M. Cadag (Mercado)	Nonpartisan

Legend
1. A + indicates that the official is elected for the first term
2. A ♯ indicates that the official is re-elected to a higher position
3. A ‹› indicates that the official is re-elected to the same position

=== Past Municipal Administrators ===
Spanish Era (1811–1898)
Inclusive years	Capitan municipal
1811	Anastacio de la Peña
1812	Roque Tenorio
1813	Melchor de la Trinidad
1814	Francisco de los Santos
1815	Marcelino Ibañez
1816	Francisco de la Torre
1817	Jose Rodrigo
1818	Gaspar Bulalacao
1819	Juan Anastacio
1820	Eugenio Ibañez
1821	Rodrigo de los Angeles
1822	Alejandro Tolosa
1823	Juan Sambajon
1824	Domingo de la Trinidad
1825	Canuto Santiago Perez
1826	Esteban Perez
1827	Ludovico de Padua
1828	Domingo de la Trinidad
1829	Francisco Borja
1830	Rodrigo S. Andres
1831	Manuel Santiago
1832	Pablo Ibañez
1833	Canuto Santiago Perez
1834	Pacual Aguilar
1835	Esteban Perez
1836	Rodrigo de los Angeles
1837	Canuto Santiago Perez
1838	Silverio Ibañez
1839	Agustin Sardiñas
1840	Francisco Avila
1841	Pioquinto Perez
1842	Bernardino Perez
1843	Espiritu Perez
1844	Pedro Osorio
1845	Bernardino Perez
1846	Juan Enciso
1847	Agustin Sardiñas
1848	Juan Ingua
1849	Marcelino Ibañez
1850	Anastacio Perez
1851	Juan Enciso
1852	Jose Pacheco
1853	Juan Ponciano Pacheco
1854	Juan Clamar
1855	Mariano Arellano
1856	Gregorio Perez
1857	Mariano Enciso
1858	Antonio Torre
1859	Claro Perez
1860	Gregorio Perez
1861	Mariano Enciso
1862	Juan Enciso
1863-1864	Benedicto Calde
1865-1866	Mariano Enciso
1867-1868	Atanacio Perez
1869-1870	Romualdo Ibañez
1871-1872	Hipolito Macandog
1873-1874	Fruto Ingua
1875-1876	Patricio Paraiso
1877-1880	Doroteo Macandog
1881-1882	Andres Moya
1883-1884	Victoriano Ry Abilla
1885-1886	Pantaleon Clemente
1887-1888	Felipe Agarin
1889-1890	Eufracio Rodriguez
1891-1892	Isidoro Perez
1893-1894	Alberto Ibañez
1895-1896	Alejandro M. Arcangel
1897-1898	Nicomedes Quintano

Republica Filipina (1898–1901)
Inclusive years	Municipal president
1898-1901	Emiterio Macandog (Appointed by Gen. Emilio F. Aguinaldo)

American Rule (1901–1941)
Inclusive years	Municipal president
1901–1903	Emiterio Macandog
1904–1905	Nicomedes Quintano
1906-1907	Prisco Aguilar
1907-1909	Gervacio Macalla
1910-1911	Adolfo Macandog
1912–1913	Abelardo Madrid
1913–1916	Tomas Valenzuela
1917-1922	Gerardo M. Arcangel
1923-1925	Tomas H. Razo
1926-1927	Luis Nuñez
1927-1928	Gaspar Torre
1929-1937	Leon N. Monilla
1938-1941	Donaciano C. Arcangel
1941	Leon N. Monilla (Elected but did not assume office due to Japanese Invasion)

Japanese Occupation (1941–1945)
Inclusive years	Municipal Mayor
December 21, 1941 – March 16, 1942	Donaciano C. Arcangel (Japanese Appointed)
March 17, 1942-June 1942	Jose Y. Arcangel (Japanese Appointed)
1942-1943	Arturo C. Macandog (Japanese Appointed)
May 3, 1944 – June 2, 1944	Juan P. Narvaez (Acting Mayor)
June 3, 1944 – November 15, 1945	Vicente Q. Macandog (Japanese Appointed)

Post-War Period (1945-date)
Inclusive years	Municipal Mayor	Municipal Vice Mayor	SK Federation President	ABC President	Remarks
September 29, 1945 – June 14, 1946	Leon N. Monilla	Vicente Perez			(Acting Mayor, Appointed by Pres. Sergio Osmeña)
June 28, 1946 – 1959	Jose N. Ortega				(Appointed by Pres. Manuel Roxas from June 28, 1946-September 9, 1947)
1960–1963	Tomas C. Pales	Eugenio Panesa			
1964–1967	Jaime P. Clamar	Jose Nobleza			
1968–1975	Tomas C. Pales	Atanacio Adorio (1968–1971); Teodoro Mancera (1972–1975)			Died in Office in 1975
1975-May 1986	Teodoro Mancera				Assume the role of presiding officer
May 1986 – 1987	Jose N. Arcangel, Jr.				Appointed Mayor by Pres. Corazon Aquino
1987–Feruary 01, 1988	Angel S. Ursua, Jr.				Appointed Mayor by Pres. Corazon Aquino
February 2, 1988 – June 30, 1998	Jose N. Arcangel, Jr.	Amancio M. Olado (1992–1995)			
June 30, 1998 – June 30, 2001	Antonio A. Herrera	Jury I. Clamar			
June 30, 2001 – June 30, 2010	Jose N. Arcangel, Jr.	Gilbert A. Clemente			
June 30, 2010 – June 30, 2019	Jorem L. Arcangel	Joey Nobleza (2013-2019)			
June 30, 2019 – June 30, 2022	Joseph L. Arcangel	Jorem L. Arcangel			
June 30, 2022 – June 30, 2028	Jorem L. Arcangel	Cezar C. Arellano			

== Education ==
The Jovellar Schools District Office governs all educational institutions within the municipality. It oversees the management and operations of all private and public, from primary to secondary schools.

Presently, there are almost 25 Day Care Centers, 20 public elementary schools, and 4 public high schools

=== Primary and elementary schools ===
- Jovellar Central School
- Bagacay Elementary School
- Bautista Elementary School
- Cabraran Elementary School
- Del Rosario Elementary School
- Estrella Elementary School
- Florista Elementary School
- Jovellar Central School (White Deer Annex)
- Lilibdon Elementary School
- Mamlad Elementary School
- Maogog Elementary School
- Medalla Milagrosa Integrated School (Elementary)
- Salvacion Elementary School
- San Isidro Elementary School
- San Roque Elementary School
- San Vicente Elementary School
- Tagas Elementary School
- Tinaldukan Elementary School
- Villa Paz Elementary School

=== Secondary schools ===
- Jovellar National High School is located at Brgy. Calzada, Jovellar. Jovellar National High School traces its beginning as a small Barangay High School incorporated at Jovellar Central School. It was founded in 1968 through the benevolent acts, initiatives and efforts of the PTA with Mrs. Teresita Laguilles and then Jovellar District SOS Benito M. Obra and the late Mayor Tomas C. Pales and designated Mr. Aurelio Narce of Jovellar Central School as the Coordinating Principal from 1968-1972.
- Mamlad National High School located at Mamlad, Jovellar, founded in 2005
- Medalla Milagrosa Integrated School – Junior High School Department located at Sitio Medalla Milagrosa (Macorocawayan), San Vicente (Inalom), Jovellar. In 2023, the school was converted from an Elementary School to an Integrated School which now offers JHS.
- San Isidro National High School located at San Isidro (Mabayawas), Jovellar, Albay, founded in 1978
