= Adrian Salceda =

Filipino politician

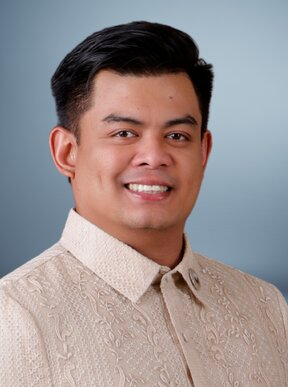
- Official portrait, 2025

Member of the Philippine House of Representatives from Albay's 3rd District
- Incumbent
- Assumed office 30 June 2025
- Preceded by: Fernando Cabredo

Mayor of Polangui
- In office 30 June 2022 – 30 June 2025
- Preceded by: Andy A. Mariscotes
- Succeeded by: Jesciel Richard G. Salced

Member of the Polangui Municipal Council as Liga ng mga Barangay president
- In office 2015 – 30 June 2016

Personal details
- Born: Raymund Adrian Enriquez Salceda; February 1, 1993 (age 33) Ligao, Albay, Philippines
- Party: Lakas (2021–present)
- Education: Bicol University – Polangui
- Occupation: Politician

Raymund Adrian Enriquez Salceda (born 1 February 1993) is a Filipino politician who currently serves as the representative of the 3rd District of Albay since June 30, 2025. He previously served as the Municipal Mayor of Polangui, Albay from 2022 to 2025.

== Early life and education ==
Salceda was born in Ligao, Albay, to Raymond and Jane Salceda. He did not complete his bachelor's degree in Electronics and Computer Engineering at Bicol University – Polangui. During his college years, he began public service as the elected Sangguniang Kabataan (SK) Chairperson of Barangay Centro Oriental in Polangui. In 2015, he was elected as the Federated SK President of the Province of Albay.

== Political career ==
=== Barangay leadership ===
After his SK term, Salceda was elected as the Barangay Captain of Centro Oriental in 2015 and subsequently became the President of the Association of Barangay Captains (ABC) in Polangui, serving as an ex-officio member of the Sangguniang Bayan.

=== Mayor of Polangui (2022–2025) ===
Salceda was elected as the Mayor of Polangui in 2022. As mayor, he launched the “HEART 4S”.

=== Chairperson, House Special Committee on Food Security (2025) ===
On August 4, 2025, Salceda was elected as Chairperson of the House of Representatives' Special Committee on Food Security during the 20th Congress, becoming one of the few first-term lawmakers to head a House committee.

In his public statement, Salceda highlighted his priorities for the committee: improving farm gate prices for Filipino farmers, increasing agricultural yield per hectare, and reducing food wastage in the supply chain. He emphasized the urgency of making local food production viable and profitable to prevent overreliance on imports and to support rural livelihoods.

As his first legislative measure in Congress, Salceda filed House Bill No. 48, which seeks to allow the National Food Authority (NFA) to purchase palay at competitive prices using excess rice tariff revenues. The bill also proposes improvements to the NFA's buffer stocking and storage systems to reduce post-harvest losses and stabilize food prices during supply shocks.
