= Libon, Albay =

Municipality in Albay, Philippines

Libon
- Municipality
- Municipality of Libon
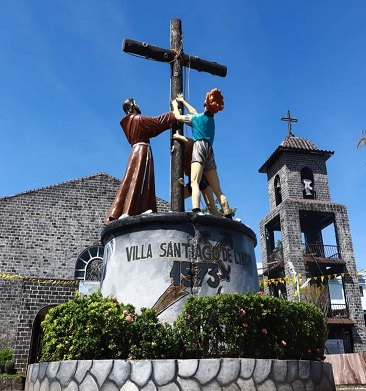
- Libon church

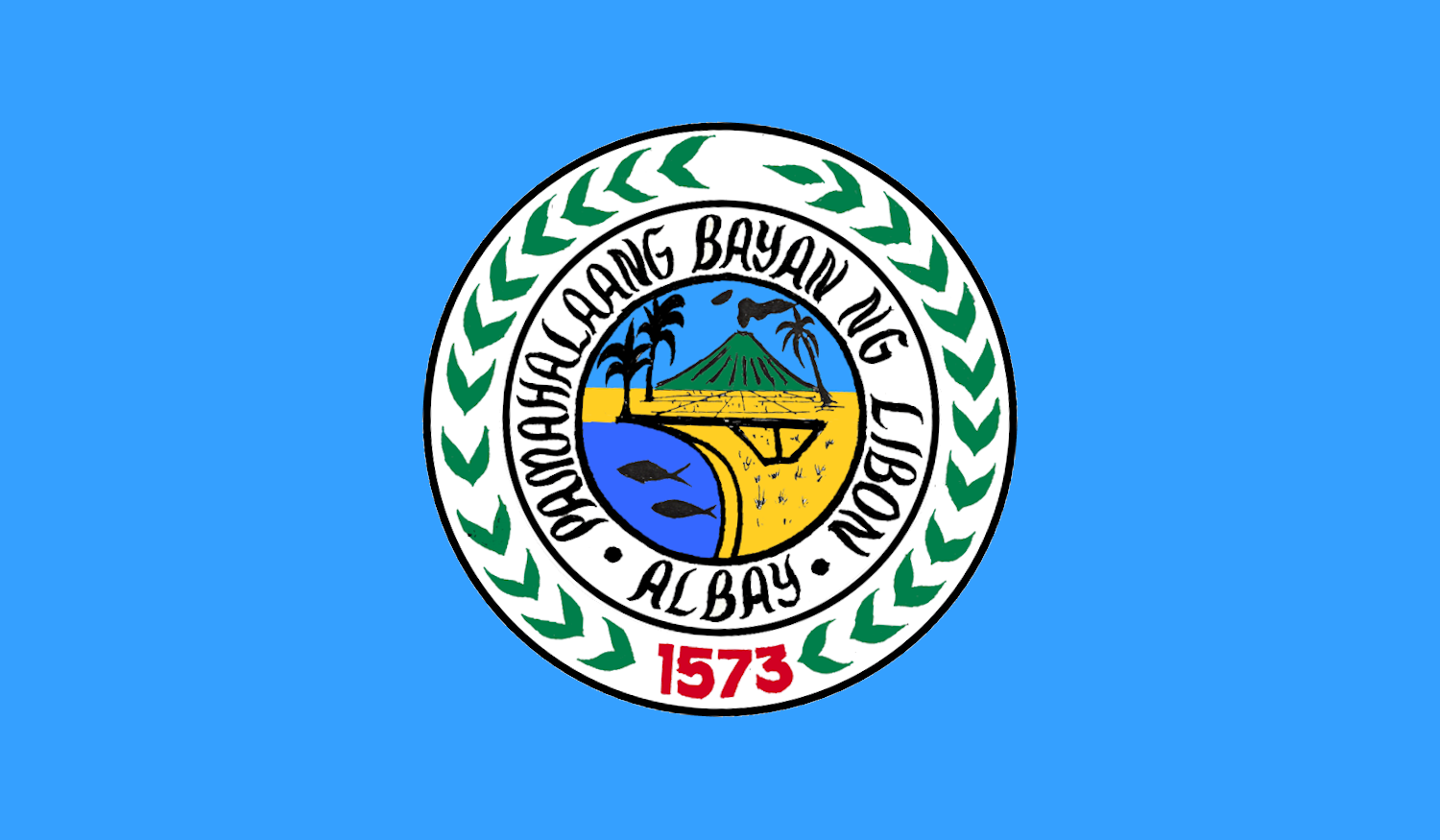
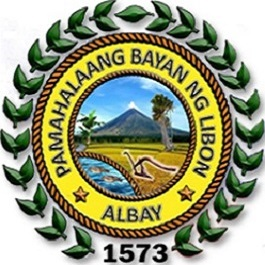
- Flag Seal
- Nicknames: Rice Granary of the Province of Albay, Birthplace of Christianity in the Bicol Region
- Anthem: Libon Hymn
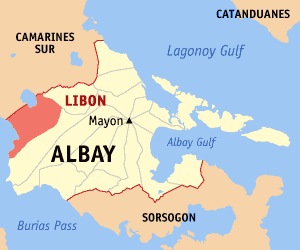
- Map of Albay with Libon highlighted
- Interactive map of Libon
- Location within the Philippines
- Coordinates: 13°18′N 123°26′E
- Country: Philippines
- Region: Bicol Region
- Province: Albay
- District: 3rd district
- Founded: 1573
- Barangays: 47 (see Barangays)

Government
  - Type: Sangguniang Bayan
  - Mayor: Markgregor Edward C. Sayson
  - Vice Mayor: Jan Saclag
  - Representative: Raymund Adrian E. Salceda
  - Municipal Council: Members: Daniel S. Dycoco; Ramon Martin L. Velasco; Edna S. Sazon; Ramon Ferdinand E. Velasco; Apolonio S. Se; Domingo B. Samson; John Andrew S. Ranera; Florian F. Briones
  - Electorate: 47,238 voters (2025)

Area
  - Total: 222.76 km^{2} (86.01 sq mi)
- Elevation: 34 m (112 ft)
- Highest elevation: 2,442 m (8,012 ft)
- Lowest elevation: 3 m (9.8 ft)

Population (2020 Census)
  - Total: 75,073
  - Density: 337.01/km^{2} (872.86/sq mi)
  - Households: 16,765
- Demonym: Libongueño

Economy
  - Income class: 1st municipal income class
  - Poverty incidence: 34.72% (2023)
  - Revenue: ₱ 404.8 million (2024)
  - Assets: ₱ 1,637 million (2024)
  - Expenditure: ₱ 247.8 million (2024)
  - Liabilities: ₱ 474.5 million (2024)

Service provider
  - Electricity: Albay Electric Cooperative (ALECO)
- Time zone: UTC+8 (PST)
- ZIP code: 4507
- PSGC: 0500507000
- IDD : area code: +63 (0)52
- Native languages: Central Bikol; Tagalog
- Catholic diocese: Diocese of Legazpi
- Website: www.libon.gov.ph

Libon, officially the Municipality of Libon (Central Bikol: Banwaan kan Libon; Tagalog: Bayan ng Libon), is a municipality in the province of Albay, Philippines. According to the 2024 census, it has a population of 72,135 people.

Libon occupies an area of 222.76 square kilometres (86.01 sq mi). It is about 37 kilometres (23 mi) west-north-west of the provincial capital of Albay Legazpi City, and about 300 kilometres (190 mi) east-south-east of Manila. It is classified as a partly urban municipality with 47 barangays subdivided into seven leagues: St. James (Poblacion), Lakeside (barangays within the vicinity of Bato Lake), Coastal (barangays located along the Albay West Coast), Big Five (barangays abundant in rice, corn, and vegetables), Interior Nine (hinterland barangays principally engaged in vegetable production and livestock raising), Palayan (barangays largely devoted to rice production), and Six Hills (barangays concentrating on coconut production).

Libon's major economic activities are agriculture and fishing. Its 4,000 hectares (9,900 acres) of rice fields produce 30.4 million kilos or 608,000 bags of palay per year, earning the district the sobriquet "Rice Granary of Albay". Libon is also the seat of the Pantao Port, a regional port facility linking the Masbate island province, the Visayas and Mindanao to mainland Bicol towards Southern Luzon and the National Capital Region.

== Etymology ==
The town of Libon, as it is presently known, was originally called Libong. It is not known when and how the letter "g" was dropped. Some writers believe that the Spaniards must have found it difficult to pronounce the word "Libong" with the letter "g", so that in due time Libong became Libon. There are conflicting and various versions regarding the origin of the name Libong. Some say that the word must have been derived from the Bicol term "libong" or "ribong", meaning puzzled, dizziness, losing one's sense of direction, or becoming oriented. Others believe that the word Libon must have originated from a Spanish term "libon", which means "assault".

Another version is that the word is a corruption of the Bicol word "libtong", meaning difficulty, obstacle or pool of stagnant water, which when applied to a place could mean a difficult or stagnant place. The more popular and perhaps more plausible version is the claim that Libon originated from the Bicol term "libong" or "ribong", and there is a story which seems to support this view. The story goes that Captain Juan de Salcedo and his men arrived in this place, by sailing across Lake Bato and entering the river called, Quimba. Sailing upstream, they finally landed in a place called Linao; (Linao is one of the barrios of Libon today and is situated on the banks of Quimba River). Here Salcedo and his men proceeded to find a town. However, after exploring the surrounding area and noting that Linao was at the foot of a mountain range, making it vulnerable to enemy attacks from the surrounding mountains, Salcedo and his men, with some natives as their guide, decided to move on to a more suitable place. Traveling across marshy land, they arrived at a slightly elevated area. Upon looking around and trying to determine where they were, one native guide remarked, "libong aco". (I am confused). The Spaniards on hearing the word "libong" understood it to mean the name of the place. Hence, Salcedo named it "Santiago de Libon."

== History ==
The town of Libon traces its origins to the "Second Expedition of Juan de Salcedo to the Bicol Region in 1573.' Travelling through the northern passageway, Salcedo had first arrived in the region in 1571, shortly after his uncle's (Miguel Lopez de Legazpi) seizure of Manila. Legazpi had ordered his nephew to subdue the area around Manila and in the process Salcedo heard rumors that "somewhere beyond the mountains of southern Luzon was a place called Paracale with its fabulous gold mines." He spent an undisclosed amount of time searching for the rumored mines, but returned to Manila upon the orders of his uncle, vowing to return to the Bicol Region as soon as he could.

He accomplished this in early 1573. "Salcedo undertook his second trip to the Bicol Region retracing his first route and with the wealth of information that he gathered during his first arrival in the region, he led his men beyond Paracale." He continued upstream on the Bicol River upstream and reached its source, Bato Lake. On the shore of the lake Salcedo established the beginnings of a "[s]ettlement for Spaniards and named it Santiago de Libong."

It appears from the accounts about the finding of Libon that this town occupies a prominent place in the history of the Bicol Region for two main reasons. First, it is the first settlement for Spaniards established in the Bicol Region, and by no less than Captain de Salcedo, recognized as the Spanish "Conquistador" of this part of Luzon. Second, Libon, during the early days of the Spanish conquest of Bicolandia, also served as the starting point for the organized propagation of the Christian faith in this region. Also, Libon possessed a prosperous and complex precolonial society, that is why it was chosen as a royal villa.

=== Saint James the Greater Parish ===
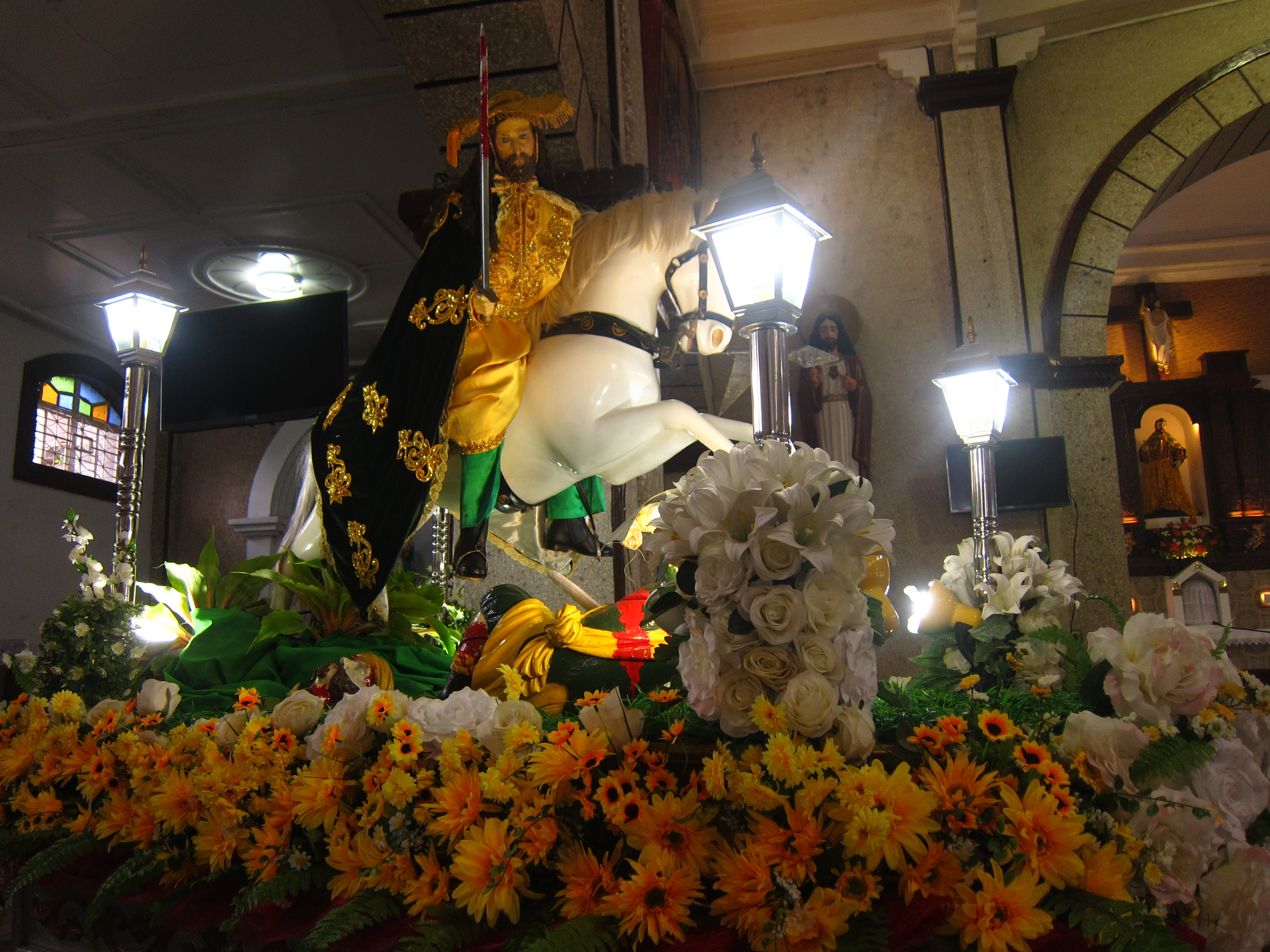
Santiago el Mayor, patron saint of Libon

In 1573, Juan de Salcedo set up the garrison named Santiago de Libong, and a church was constructed under the patronage of Saint James the Apostle. In 1578, when the Franciscans arrive, it was ceded to the province under San Gregorio Magno. A church made of red bricks was constructed in Linao in 1591. This church was destroyed in mid 17th century and a new church was constructed. The 1818 census showed the area had 410 native families and 1 Spanish-Filipino family.

In 1847, the town was ceded to Albay from Camarines. Huerta reported that the new church was reconstructed by Vicente de Dosbarrios in 1865 and it was made of solid bricks, while the casa parroquial was made of stone. The church was destroyed by a strong earthquake in 1907 and it had to reconstructed with new materials.

== Geography ==
Libon is located at 13°18′N 123°26′E.

The housing growth rate in Libon is 1.08% per annum, the municipality has a land area of 222.76 square kilometres (86.01 sq mi) constituting 8.65% of the 2,575.77-square-kilometre- (994.51 sq mi) total area of Albay.

The municipality lies at the Northwestern Quadrant of the province of Albay. The distance is about 46-54 kilometers away from Legazpi City and approximately 546 kilometers south of Manila. It is located geographically between 1308’2’’ and 20’354.5’’ north and between 1243014’25.2’’ and 29’19.4’’ east longitude. Libon is bounded on the North by the Municipality of Bato in the province of Camarines Sur; on the South by the municipality of Oas; on the East by the municipality of Polangui; and on the West by the Burias Pass and Ragay Gulf.

The topography of Libon is generally characterized as plain to undulating; extensive alluvial floodplain on its eastern flank, gently rolling to sloping uplands and steep mountains on its central western parts.

The elevation ranges from 0 to 400 meters above sea level. More than five percent of the area has elevation ranging from 100 to 150 meters above sea level. The surface terrain is generally plain. Barangays in the Big Six, Centro Poblacion, and Palayan League mostly constitute the plain areas. The barangays within the Coastal League occupies the coastal zones of 664 hectares although 40 percent of its area is mountainous surface terrain.

The Municipality has six types of soil. The predominant soil type is the Agustin soil or clay-loam, which is mostly found in the leagues of Interior Eight, Big Six, and Six Hills. The Magsaysay soil or the sandy-loam is identified in the coastal areas and is suitable for rice production. The Sevilla soil or clay and sandy-clay type are principally in hilly landscape.

The Municipality also borders Lake Bato in the north.

=== Barangays ===
Libon is politically subdivided into 47 barangays. Each barangay consists of puroks and some have sitios.

| PSGC | Barangay | Population | | | ±% p.a. | |
| | | 2024 | | 2010 | | |
|---|---|---|---|---|---|---|
| 050507001 | Alongong | 2.1% | 1,529 | 1,403 | ▴ | 0.59% |
| 050507002 | Apud | 2.7% | 1,938 | 2,004 | ▾ | −0.23% |
| 050507003 | Bacolod | 2.0% | 1,450 | 1,211 | ▴ | 1.25% |
| 050507011 | Bariw | 1.8% | 1,297 | 1,206 | ▴ | 0.50% |
| 050507012 | Bonbon | 5.3% | 3,820 | 3,310 | ▴ | 0.99% |
| 050507013 | Buga | 5.2% | 3,748 | 3,503 | ▴ | 0.47% |
| 050507014 | Bulusan | 3.0% | 2,169 | 2,064 | ▴ | 0.34% |
| 050507015 | Burabod | 2.9% | 2,057 | 2,002 | ▴ | 0.19% |
| 050507016 | Caguscos | 1.5% | 1,051 | 980 | ▴ | 0.48% |
| 050507017 | East Carisac | 1.3% | 947 | 839 | ▴ | 0.84% |
| 050507019 | Harigue | 1.2% | 876 | 819 | ▴ | 0.46% |
| 050507020 | Libtong | 1.2% | 886 | 819 | ▴ | 0.54% |
| 050507021 | Linao | 2.1% | 1,544 | 1,445 | ▴ | 0.46% |
| 050507022 | Mabayawas | 0.6% | 404 | 473 | ▾ | −1.08% |
| 050507023 | Macabugos | 3.9% | 2,840 | 2,614 | ▴ | 0.57% |
| 050507024 | Magallang | 0.7% | 512 | 436 | ▴ | 1.11% |
| 050507025 | Malabiga | 1.2% | 857 | 966 | ▾ | −0.82% |
| 050507026 | Marayag | 1.3% | 966 | 1,099 | ▾ | −0.88% |
| 050507027 | Matara | 1.2% | 894 | 856 | ▴ | 0.30% |
| 050507028 | Molosbolos | 1.5% | 1,084 | 1,094 | ▾ | −0.06% |
| 050507029 | Natasan | 1.4% | 1,033 | 1,021 | ▴ | 0.08% |
| 050507045 | Niño Jesus (Santo Niño Jesus) | 0.5% | 342 | 390 | ▾ | −0.90% |
| 050507030 | Nogpo | 3.2% | 2,281 | 2,118 | ▴ | 0.51% |
| 050507031 | Pantao | 9.6% | 6,930 | 6,767 | ▴ | 0.16% |
| 050507033 | Rawis | 3.1% | 2,250 | 2,234 | ▴ | 0.05% |
| 050507034 | Sagrada Familia | 2.3% | 1,666 | 1,591 | ▴ | 0.32% |
| 050507035 | Salvacion | 0.7% | 518 | 475 | ▴ | 0.60% |
| 050507036 | Sampongan | 0.6% | 458 | 403 | ▴ | 0.88% |
| 050507037 | San Agustin (Pangpang) | 3.6% | 2,570 | 2,460 | ▴ | 0.30% |
| 050507038 | San Antonio (Nali) | 2.1% | 1,519 | 1,423 | ▴ | 0.45% |
| 050507039 | San Isidro | 2.6% | 1,883 | 1,670 | ▴ | 0.83% |
| 050507040 | San Jose (Quipalbon) | 4.1% | 2,982 | 2,973 | ▴ | 0.02% |
| 050507041 | San Pascual | 1.7% | 1,229 | 1,143 | ▴ | 0.50% |
| 050507042 | San Ramon (Langla) | 1.1% | 764 | 795 | ▾ | −0.27% |
| 050507043 | San Vicente | 4.1% | 2,989 | 2,733 | ▴ | 0.62% |
| 050507044 | Santa Cruz | 2.1% | 1,514 | 1,443 | ▴ | 0.33% |
| 050507046 | Talin-Talin | 2.2% | 1,555 | 1,496 | ▴ | 0.27% |
| 050507047 | Tambo Walis | 1.2% | 862 | 838 | ▴ | 0.19% |
| 050507049 | Villa Petrona | 2.1% | 1,497 | 1,372 | ▴ | 0.60% |
| 050507018 | West Carisac | 1.5% | 1,053 | 1,014 | ▴ | 0.26% |
| 050507004 | Zone I (Poblacion) | 2.1% | 1,486 | 1,379 | ▴ | 0.51% |
| 050507005 | Zone II (Poblacion) | 1.7% | 1,249 | 1,287 | ▾ | −0.21% |
| 050507006 | Zone III (Poblacion) | 0.9% | 670 | 651 | ▴ | 0.20% |
| 050507007 | Zone IV (Poblacion) | 2.5% | 1,769 | 1,598 | ▴ | 0.70% |
| 050507008 | Zone V (Poblacion) | 1.5% | 1,068 | 994 | ▴ | 0.49% |
| 050507009 | Zone VI (Poblacion) | 0.7% | 531 | 571 | ▾ | −0.50% |
| 050507010 | Zone VII (Poblacion) | 2.3% | 1,635 | 1,545 | ▴ | 0.39% |
| | Total | | 72,135 | 71,527 | ▴ | 0.06% |

=== Climate ===
Climate data for Libon, Albay
| Month | Jan | Feb | Mar | Apr | May | Jun | Jul | Aug | Sep | Oct | Nov | Dec | Year |
|---|---|---|---|---|---|---|---|---|---|---|---|---|---|
| Mean daily maximum °C (°F) | 27 (81) | 28 (82) | 29 (84) | 31 (88) | 31 (88) | 30 (86) | 29 (84) | 29 (84) | 29 (84) | 29 (84) | 29 (84) | 28 (82) | 29 (84) |
| Mean daily minimum °C (°F) | 22 (72) | 22 (72) | 22 (72) | 24 (75) | 25 (77) | 25 (77) | 25 (77) | 25 (77) | 25 (77) | 24 (75) | 24 (75) | 23 (73) | 24 (75) |
| Average precipitation mm (inches) | 55 (2.2) | 36 (1.4) | 45 (1.8) | 42 (1.7) | 114 (4.5) | 184 (7.2) | 245 (9.6) | 224 (8.8) | 238 (9.4) | 171 (6.7) | 130 (5.1) | 94 (3.7) | 1,578 (62.1) |
| Average rainy days | 13.0 | 9.5 | 11.8 | 12.7 | 21.3 | 25.3 | 28.3 | 26.5 | 26.4 | 24.2 | 19.9 | 16.1 | 235 |
Source: Meteoblue

== Government ==
=== Past Municipal Administrators ===
| Inclusive years | Mayor |
|---|---|
| 1898 | Don Jose Velasco |
| 1898-February 22, 1899 | Ignacio Calleja (Appointed by Gen. Emilio F. Aguinaldo) |
| February 23, 1899 – 1900 | Nicolas Rey |
| 1900-1902 | Andres Calleja |
| 1902-1904 | Mariano Ranera |
| 1904-1906 | Vicente Velasco |
| 1906-1909 | Felix Maronilla |
| 1909-1916 | Reymundo Seva |
| 1916-1922 | Juan Serrano |
| 1922-1925 | Benito Cerdiña |
| 1925-1928 | Avelino Fernandez |
| 1928-1931 | Olimpio Sevilla |
| 1931-1941 | Silvino Samson |
| 1941-1944 | (Japanese Appointed) |
| 1944-1945 | |
| June 28, 1946 – 1947 | Bernardo Ceguerra |
| 1947-1955 | Ramon M. Velasco |
| 1956-1959 | Braulio Sayson |
| 1960-1967 | Ramon M. Velasco |
| 1968-1979 | Querubin M. Dycoco |
| 1980-February 25, 1986 | |
| 1986-1987 | |
| 1987-1988 | |
| 1988-1992 | Celso Cortes |
| 1992-1995 | Querubin M. Dycoco |
| 1995-2004 | John V. Dycoco |
| 2004-2013 | Agnes P. Dycoco |
| 2013-2016 | John V. Dycoco |
| 2016-2025 | Wilfredo V. Maronilla |
| June 30, 2025 to Present | Markgregor Edward C. Sayson |

== Demographics ==
Population census of Libon
| Year | Pop. | ±% p.a. |
|---|---|---|
| 1903 | 4,616 | — |
| 1918 | 8,638 | +4.27% |
| 1939 | 15,789 | +2.91% |
| 1948 | 23,931 | +4.73% |
| 1960 | 31,599 | +2.34% |
| 1970 | 43,652 | +3.28% |
| 1975 | 47,890 | +1.88% |
| 1980 | 52,159 | +1.72% |
| 1990 | 60,281 | +1.46% |
| 1995 | 63,190 | +0.89% |
| 2000 | 66,213 | +1.01% |
| 2007 | 68,846 | +0.54% |
| 2010 | 71,527 | +1.40% |
| 2015 | 75,172 | +0.95% |
| 2020 | 75,073 | −0.03% |
| 2024 | 72,135 | −0.95% |
Source: Philippine Statistics Authority

In the 2024 census, Libon had a population of 72,135 people. The population density was 320 inhabitants per square kilometre (830/sq mi).

According to NSO in 2010, a barangay is classified as urban if it has a population greater than or equal to 5,000; or at least one establishment with a minimum of 100 employees; or five or more establishments with 10-99 employees, and five or more facilities within the two-kilometer radius from the barangay hall.

In this municipality, fourteen (14) barangays were classified by the National Statistics Office (NSO) as urban and 33 as rural barangays. Those barangays classified as urban are Barangays Bonbon, Buga, Pantao, San pogi, San Isidro, San Jose, San Vicente and Zone 1-7 of Centro Poblacion.

Using the 2015 PSA data on population, it was figured that 33,081 of the total population reside at urban areas while slight majority of the population (39,467) reside in rural barangays.

Population data by urban-rural classification of areas which date back to 1995 up to 2015 show that most of the population resides at rural areas. However, there was an abrupt decrease of rural settlers from 69.77% in 2010 to 54.40% in 2015. This is postulated to be due to availability and accessibility of social services in urban areas.

== Economy ==
Poverty incidence of Libon (%)

Source: Philippine Statistics Authority

Farming and fishing are Libon's major economic activities. Based on the NSO Census 2015, most of the gainful workers (12,172) of the municipality are farmers and fisherfolks. Out of which, 5,301 (43.55%) of those who are devoted to agriculture, forestry and fishing are aged 25–44 years old.

Out of the total land area of the Municipality of Libon which is 22,713 hectares, 5,522.45 hectares or 24.31% of total land area is devoted to rice (4,385.30 ha), corn (899.40 ha), vegetables and other crops (237.65 ha) production.

Libon, being in Albay's lowland zone down to Lake Bato, is suitable for rice production, freshwater fishpond and crops. The area has a slope of not more than 8 percent and elevations not exceeding 100 meters above sea level and is generally of low soil permeability with no significant limitations of rock. With these, Libon plays a key role with regards to food security of the province. As the Rice Granary of Albay, Libon produces 30.4 million kilograms of rice from its 4,000 hectares of rice lands. Libon, along with Oas and Polangui are medium-sized towns considered as rice granary municipalities endowed with plenty of agri-based industries. Rice area planted in Albay for CY 2015 accounts to 52,044.46 hectares (dry and wet season) wherein the municipality of Libon has the biggest area of 7,753 hectares. Labor absorption by the rice industry is the highest among the agriculture sub-sectors involving farmers and family members. Of Albay's total rice farmers of 38,406, Libon has 3,823, the most in the 3rd District and the 2nd most number in the Province, after Malinao.

Coconut is the flagship commodity of the province of Albay under the Philippine Rural Development Program (PRDP). In 2015, Libon, with its 30 coconut-producing barangays accounting for 10,894 hectares of land, produced 500,938,608 tons of coconuts, the second highest in Albay after Ligao City.

Settlement expansions are developed in areas with new opportunities like employment, trade, education, accessibility and other socio-economic sectors that have direct benefits to the people. Bonbon of Libon is a convergence area of traders and producers coming from Albay's West Coast and Bato of Camarines Sur. It is the most convenient satellite transport node between Libon and the upland and western barangays of Bato, Camarines Sur. Another barangay in Libon which will emerge economically is Pantao as the opening of the Pantao Regional Port is expected to spur development and economic activities in the area.

The second kind of business and industry in the municipality are wholesale and retail trade; and repair of motor vehicles and motorcycles. A total of 1,518 people are engaged in this kind of business. Least number of gainful workers (5) are engaged in real estate activities.

90.60% of the employed household members (17,257) work within the municipality of Libon. Some 4.75% of them (820) are employed in different provinces, while 2.07% (394) of gainful workers are employed in different municipalities in Albay. There are 494 employees (2.59%) who are working abroad.

== Culture ==
=== Libon Paroy Festival ===
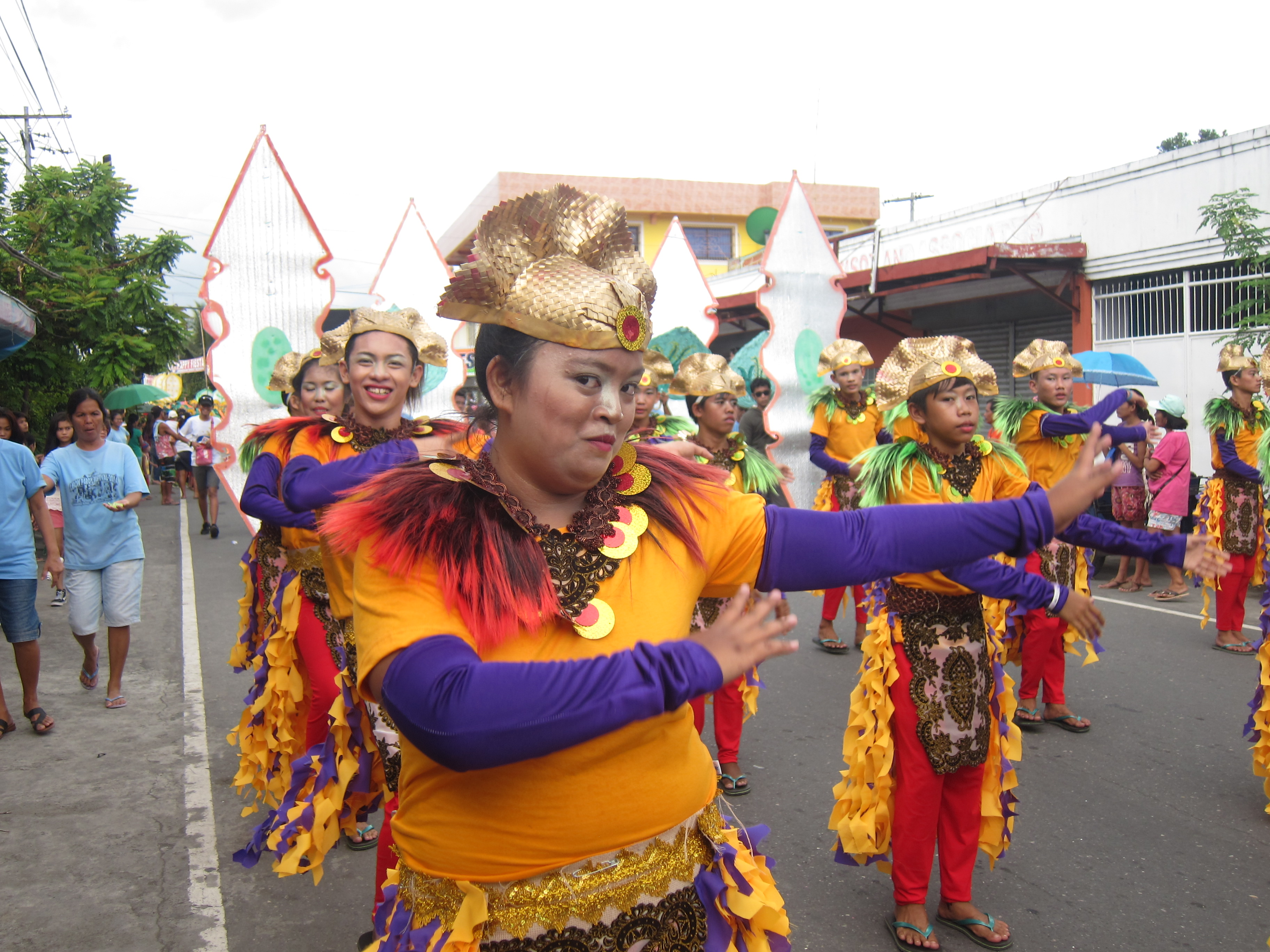
Libon Paroy Festival

Celebrated every July 22–25, Libon Paroy Festival is a celebration of the town's rich agricultural heritage as the Rice Granary of the province of Albay for its bountiful harvest of paroy or rice. It is the town's biggest celebration devoted to paying homage to Santiago el Mayor, Libon's patron saint, as well as the local farmers of Libon, considered heroes of the local economy and symbols of courage, determination, and passion. The annual festivities emblazon and commemorates the opulent past of the Municipality of Libon as one of the oldest settlements in the Philippines.

Activities include the parade of carabaos dressed in festive costumes, pulling carts adorned with decorations, usually the town's agricultural harvests. Other highlights include Lutong Libongueño, a culinary competition and feast featuring local cuisines such as pecadillo (deep-fried, spice-stuffed tilapia), tinoktok (a variety of pinangat), native delicacies made from rice and root crops; Paroy Exhibit that showcases the varieties of rice planted in Libon as well as the products made by different organizations in Libon such as camote growers, kababaihan associations, barangay-based farmers associations, MSMEs, banca racing, street dance competitions featuring different festivals around the country, cross-country mountain bike competition, baton and DLC competitions, Farmer's Forum, Color Fun Run and marathon, boxing tournament, paralympic games, Miss Libon Beauty Pageant, Laro ng Lahi Nyan mga taga-Libon, LGBTQ and Mardi Gras parade, singing and dancing competitions, and religious merriments. The month-long celebration culminates on July 25, the day of the feast.

== Tourism ==
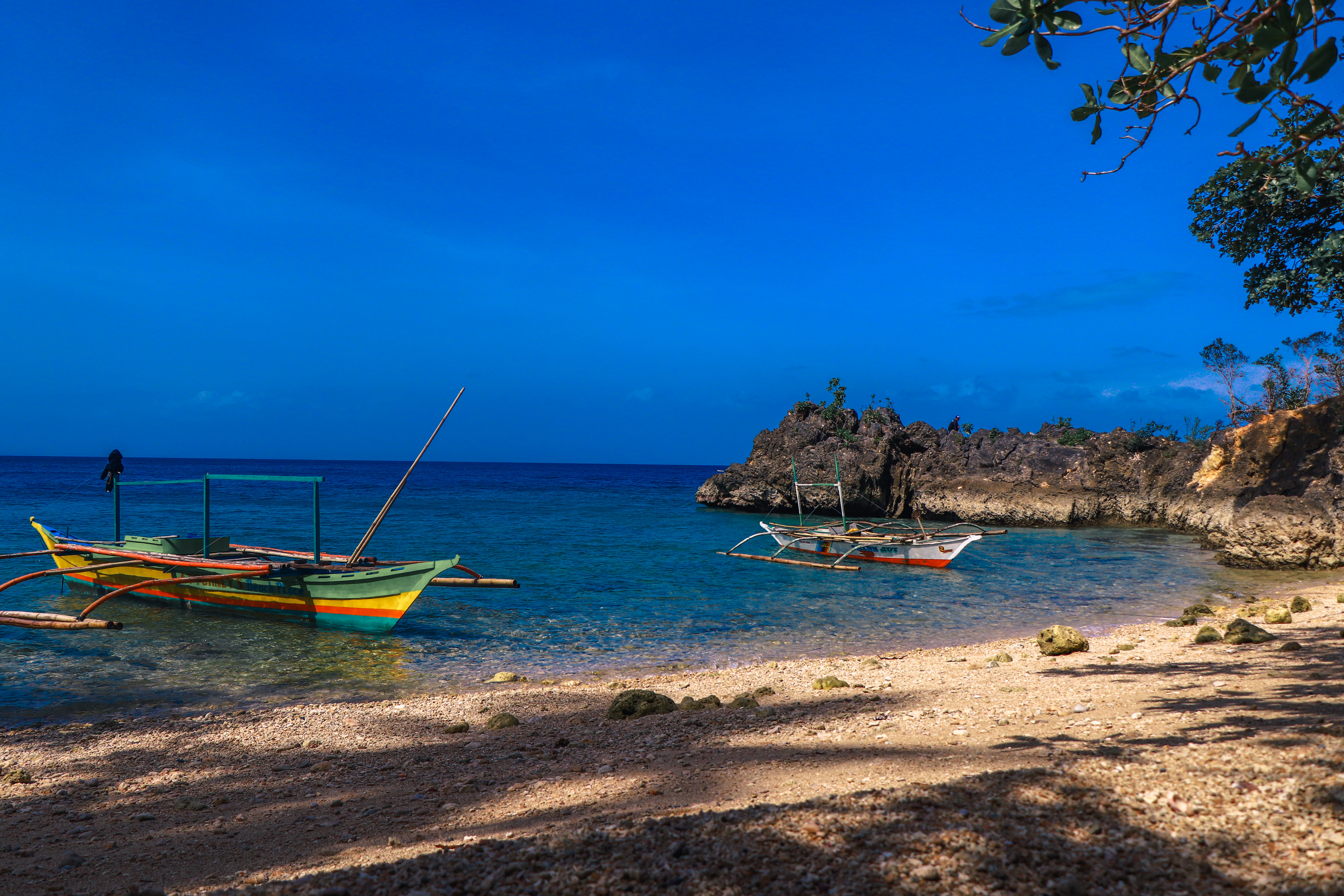
Tallinn-Tallinn Beach

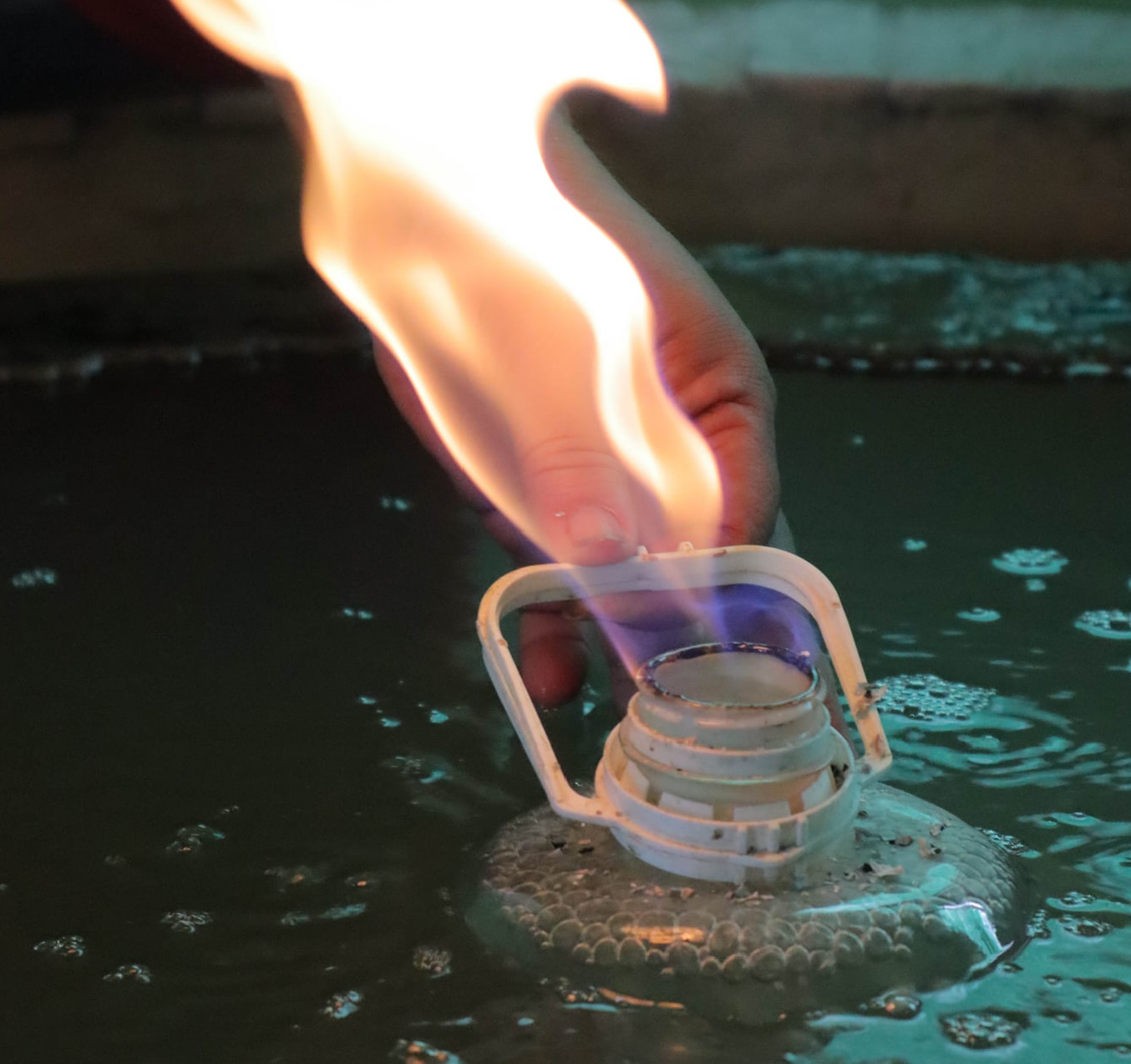
Flaming water in Poblacion

Tourists are attracted to Libon for its natural terrestrial and aquatic sceneries, rich history, culture, and cuisine. Libon is one of the oldest settlements in the Philippines. It is also known as the "Rice Granary of Albay" for its substantial harvest of rice.

Moreover, Libon is part of both the Ticao-Burias Pass Protected Seascape (TBPPS) known for its rich marine life and biodiversity, as well as that of the Albay UNESCO Biosphere Reserve. Pantao, which was one of the biggest shipyards back during the Spanish colonization of the country, is the site of the Bicol Regional Port, said to be a major economic driver for Libon for being a gateway to the Visayas and Mindanao. Its location, the Albay West Coast is an idyllic string of beaches covering six coastal barangays. Rock formations (Bantigue), shoals (Rawis Shoal/Sand Bar), fish and marine sanctuary (Rawis-Apud) with a variety of corals and marine life are some of the wonders popular to local tourists. Macabugos, a coastal barangay, is an emerging agri-tourism site in Bicol for its grape farm/vineyard, owned by Villa Miranda Farm and Resort. The farm also has an edible mushroom facility and a garden with unique fruits such as purple guava, guapple and strawberry. Mount Quiasog, also in Macabugos, is an ideal camping, spelunking and trekking site. Its most prominent feature is a towering monolith rock surrounded by caves. The National Museum of the Philippines is set to conduct archeological survey in some of the caves for potential artefacts that could link the legend of Asog, the enchanter-protector of the mountain to the way of life of ancient natives. The once secluded barangay has become Libon's leading tourism destination, even serving as a venue for one of the pre-pageant activities of an international beauty pageant for tourism.

Buga, a barangay situated at the banks of Lake Bato, is a potential eco-tourism area for activities such as boating, bird-watching and fishing. Caguscos, a land-locked barangay is developing Mount Lanagan as an eco-adventure and retreat site. The area has at least fourteen caves, some are still unexplored, two small lakes on top of it, and a panoramic view of the sea (Burias Pass, the Lake Bato, majority of the Albay province and Bicol's prominent mountains such as Mayon Volcano, Mount Masaraga, Mount Malinao and Mount Asog). Caves and falls are also abundant in Libon. Linao, the oldest barangay of the town, has two of these wonders, although both have been altered by natural causes such as degradation and flooding. Linao's neighboring barangay of San Ramon is where Balinsasayawan Cave is located. It is a limestone cave named after the swiftlet, locally known in the Philippines as balinsasayaw, which is an adept inhabitant of caves and whose nests made of their saliva, are a popular ingredient for soup across the country. Adjacent to this wonder, is a view deck in San Pascual, one of Libon's upland barangays. The site commands a view of a majority of Libon's timberland and forest areas.

A few kilometers from San Pascual is Barangay San Jose, which has several falls: Cañeta and Mararag. Both of which are hidden in the mountains and serve as natural bathing sites for locals. Gogongon Falls, located at Barangay Harigue, north of San Jose, is also a popular falls in the municipality. The area has a natural lagoon ideal for swimming. All of these falls require at most an hour of walking and/or trekking. Adventure-loving tourists could use a good time with nature and greens along the way. Some of noteworthy addition to points of interest and potential tourism sites are the Bulusan River Promenade which has served as venue for boat racing during town festival, mangrove sites in the several coastal barangays, multi-species hatchery facility in Rawis, the Libon Business, Recreational and Institutional Center (LBIRC) at Barangay Zone 1, unexplored caves and falls in Molosbolos, the site of the proposed Pantao People's Park, the Libon Macapagal Gymnasium, Rizal Park and several spring resorts in Big Five barangays. Bonbon, a strategic barangay for commerce and trade, houses a local market where handicrafts such as those made of abaca, buri, agas or water lily, and other indigenous hemps and fibers are sold. Meat, fish, vegetables, root crops and other fresh harvests are also available in this barangay.

For excursionists with limited time or energy for a whole-day itinerary, Poblacion will be a good trip for local history and wonders. Libon Central School houses the Flaming Water of Libon, which has been featured several times by local television shows. For faith tourism, the Saint James the Greater Parish Church at Barangay Zone 4 is Libon's main religious thoroughfare. The materials at the back portion of the church are remnants of the old church of Linao, one of the earliest in Albay. The home of Santiago el Mayor, Libon's patron saint, the St. James the Greater Parish Church reminds both the visitors and natives of Libon's of the town's opulent past as one of the oldest settlements in the Philippines, being founded in 1573 as a Spanish citadel with its former name, "Villa Santiago de Libong", and of its significance in the propagation of Christianity during the early phase of the Spanish occupation of the country.

== Education ==
There are two schools district offices which govern all educational institutions within the municipality. They oversee the management and operations of all private and public, from primary to secondary schools. These are the:

- Libon East Schools District
- Libon West Schools District

=== Primary and elementary schools ===
- Alongong Elementary School
- Apud Elementary School
- Bacolod Elementary School
- Balinsayawan Elementary School
- Bariw Elementary School
- Bonbon Elementary School
- Buga Elementary School
- Bulusan Elementary School
- Burabod Elementary School
- Caguscos Elementary School
- Colegio de Sta. Luisa de Marillac
- East Carisac Elementary School
- Harigue Elementary School
- J. Cortes Elementary School
- Libon East Central School
- Libtong Elementary School
- Linao Elementary School
- Mabayawas Elementary School
- Macabugos Elementary School
- Magallang Elementary School
- Malabiga Elementary School
- Marayag Elementary School
- Matara Elementary School
- Molosbolos Elementary School
- Natasan Elementary School
- Nino Jesus Elementary School
- Pantao Elementary School
- Pinagbadilan Elementary School
- Pintason Elementary School
- Rawis Elementary School
- Sagrada Familia Elementary School
- Salvacion Elementary School
- Sampongan Elementary School
- San Antonio Elementary School
- San Isidro Elementary School
- San Jose Elementary School
- San Pascual Elementary School
- San Ramon Elementary School
- San Vicente Elementary School
- Seva Child Learning Center
- Sta. Cruz Elementary School
- Tagbac Elementary School
- Talin-Talin Elementary School
- Tambo Elementary School
- Villa Petrona Elementary School
- West Carisac Elementary School

=== Secondary schools ===
- Bonbon National High School
- Buga National High School
- Libon Agro-Industrial High School
- Libon Community College
- Libon Private High School
- Macabugos High School
- Malabiga High School
- Matara High School
- Pantao National High School
- Rawis High School
- San Agustin Integrated School
- San Jose National High School
- San Pascual National High School
- San Ramon High School
- San Vicente National High School

== Notable personalities ==
- Juan Miguel "Migz" Zubiri – senator (2007-2011, 2016-2022, 2022-present), 24th Senate president (2022-2024), Senate Majority Leader (2008-2010, 2018-2022); former representative of Bukidnon's 3rd district (1998-2007). He traces his roots from Libon, a birthplace of his mother Maria Victoria Ocampo Fernandez who migrated with her family to Bukidnon as a child.
