= Battle of Camalig =

Battle in Philippine Revolutionary War

- Part of the Philippine Revolution
Date	April 2, 1898
Location	Camalig, Albay
Result	Filipino victory

Belligerents
Filipino Revolutionaries	Spanish Empire

Commanders and leaders
Vito Belarmino; Simeón Ola; Glicerio Delgado	~Fernando Primo de Rivera

Strength
80–100 irregulars	150

Casualties and losses
14 killed, 37 wounded	76 killed, 72 captured

The Battle of Camalig in Albay province, Philippines, was fought on April 2, 1898 between the forces of colonial Spanish government in Bicol Region and Bicolanos under Bicolano revolutionaries General Vito Belarmino (the Zone Commander of Katipunero Forces in the Bicol Region), Simeón Ola, and Glicerio Delgado during the Philippine Revolutionary War. The latter were victorious in this battle, and General Vito Belarmino, in gratitude to his leadership, promoted Ola to the rank of Captain.

It was the first major battle of the revolution in Bicol mainland, a victory that would trigger a tide of revolutionary fervor throughout the region. Following the battle, Spanish forces in Albay province were placed on full alert.

The Philippine forces captured 72 Spanish light infantrymen and their weapons during this action.

== See also ==
- Siege of Masbate
