= Jun Lozada =

Filipino whistleblower

Lozada (right) with former Philippine president Corazon Aquino in February 2008.

Rodolfo Noel Imperial Lozada Jr., known as Jun Lozada is a Filipino electronics and communications engineer and former chief executive officer of the Philippine Forest Corporation who served as a technical consultant to former Philippine Socio-Economic Planning Secretary Romulo Neri on the Philippine national broadband project of 2007. He later became the chief whistleblower on irregularities in the same project in what was to be touted as the NBN-ZTE Scandal.

A graduate of the University of Santo Tomas, Lozada has a 20-year experience in executive and management positions in the private sector. He assumed the post of president and CEO of PhilForest, a corporate arm of the Department of Environment and Natural Resources, in 2004. In this capacity, he directed the government's program for the propagation and commercial cultivation of the tuba-tuba or jatropha plant, a source of biodiesel.

Lozada hails from Ligao in Albay. He is an avid golfer. He is also the developer of Theft Apprehension and Asset Recovery Application (TARA App), an anti-theft smartphone app that activates a kill switch and a loud shout alarm if thieves steal the cellphone.

== Graft case and arrest ==
The Sandiganbayan filed graft charges against him in 2012. In August 2016, the Sandiganbayan found him guilty of one charge of graft due to him awarding 6.599 hectares of public land to his brother, Orlando Lozada. On June 2, 2022, Lozada voluntarily surrendered to the NBI after the Sandiganbayan reportedly issued an arrest warrant after the Supreme Court reaffirmed the 2016 graft case. He was incarcerated in New Bilibid Prison and released in 2025.
