= Albay =

Province in Bicol, Philippines

- Province
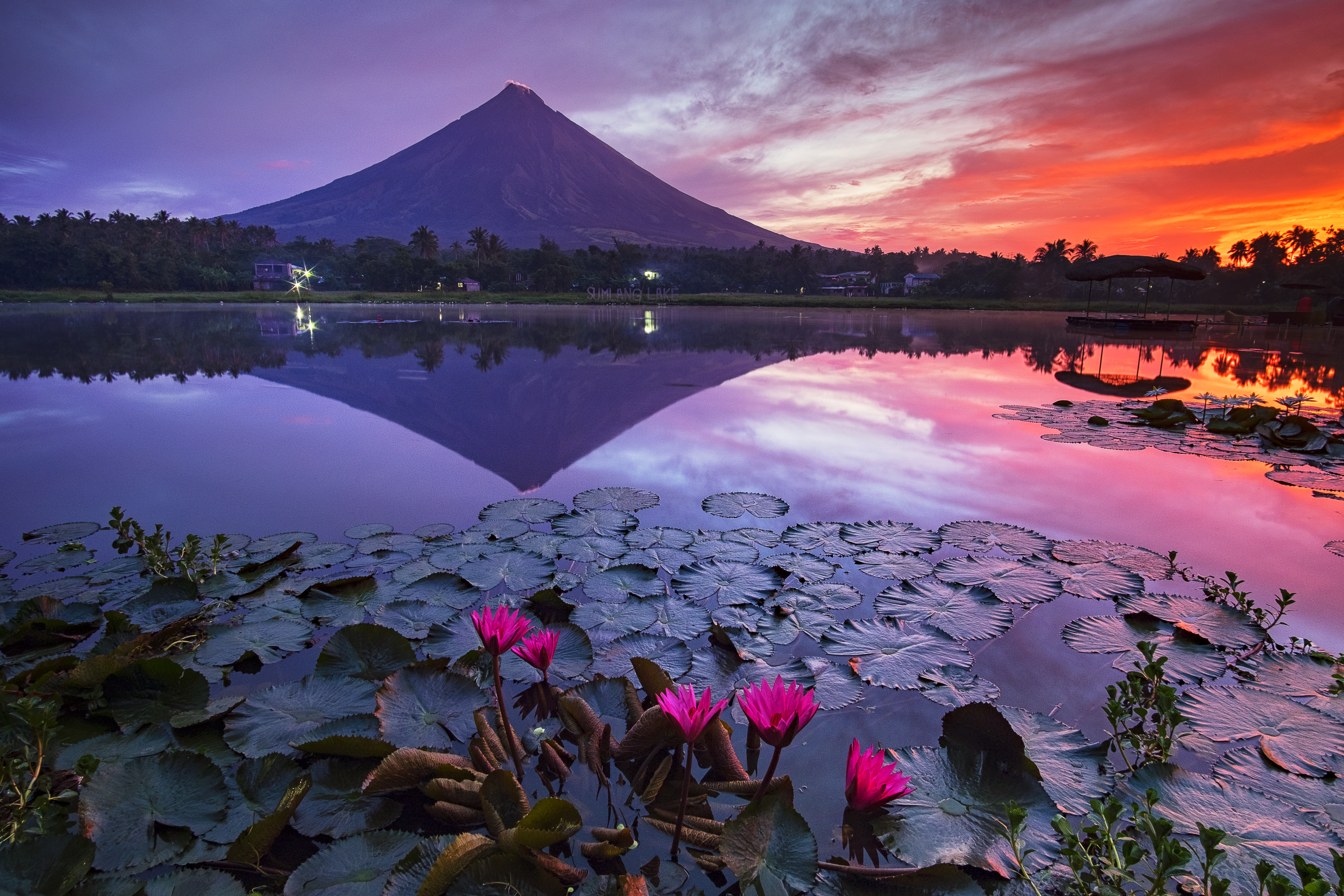
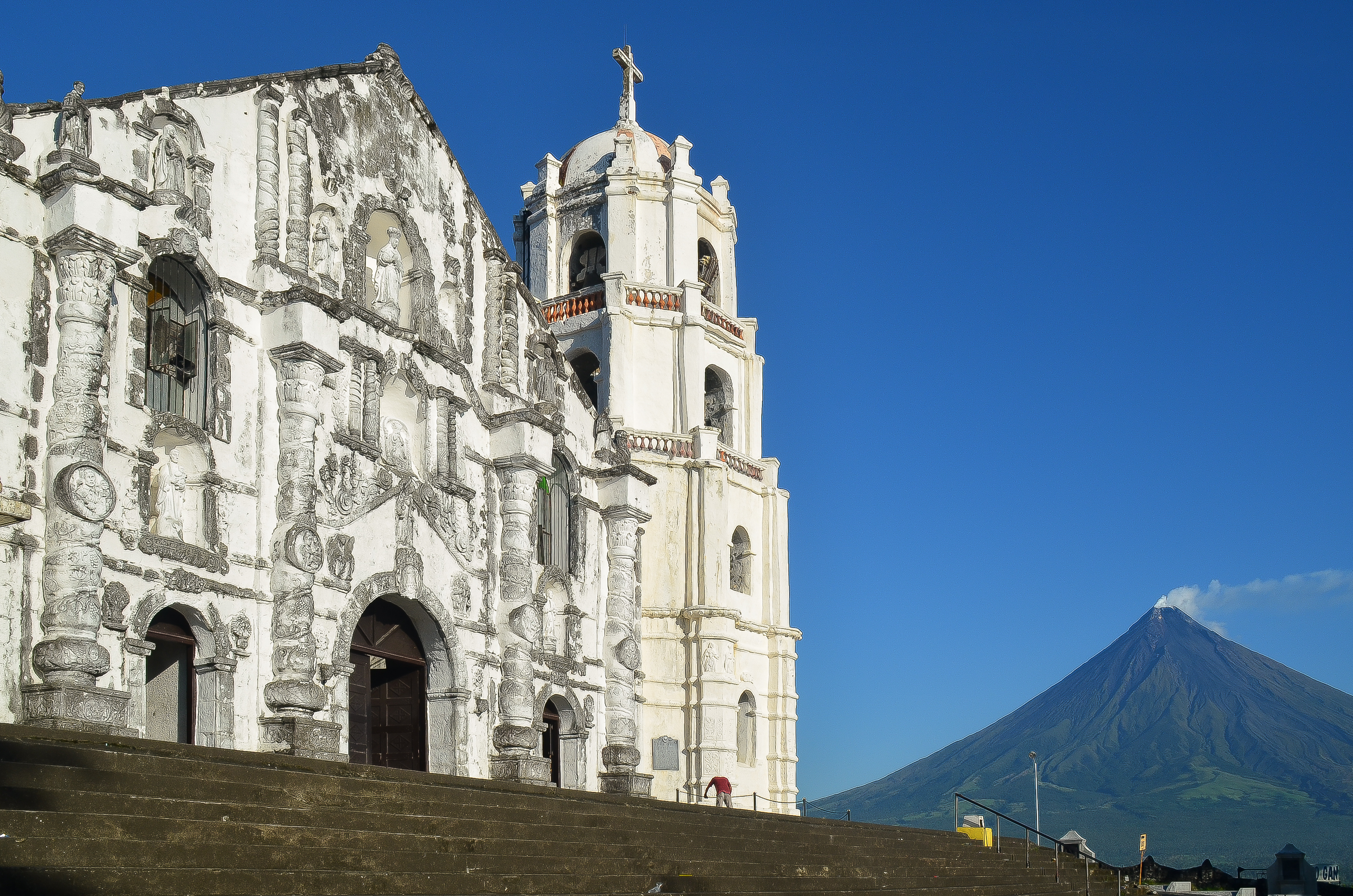
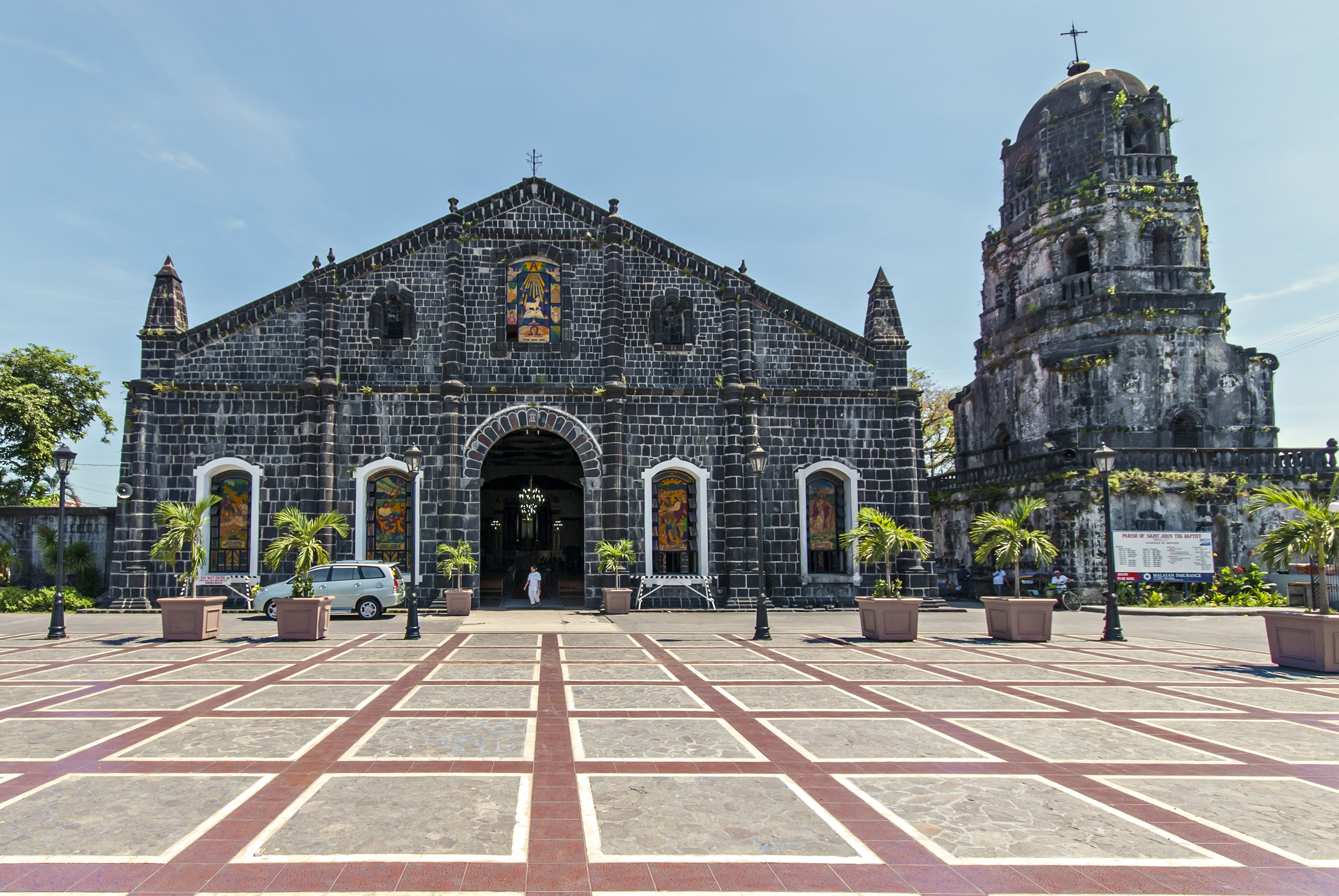
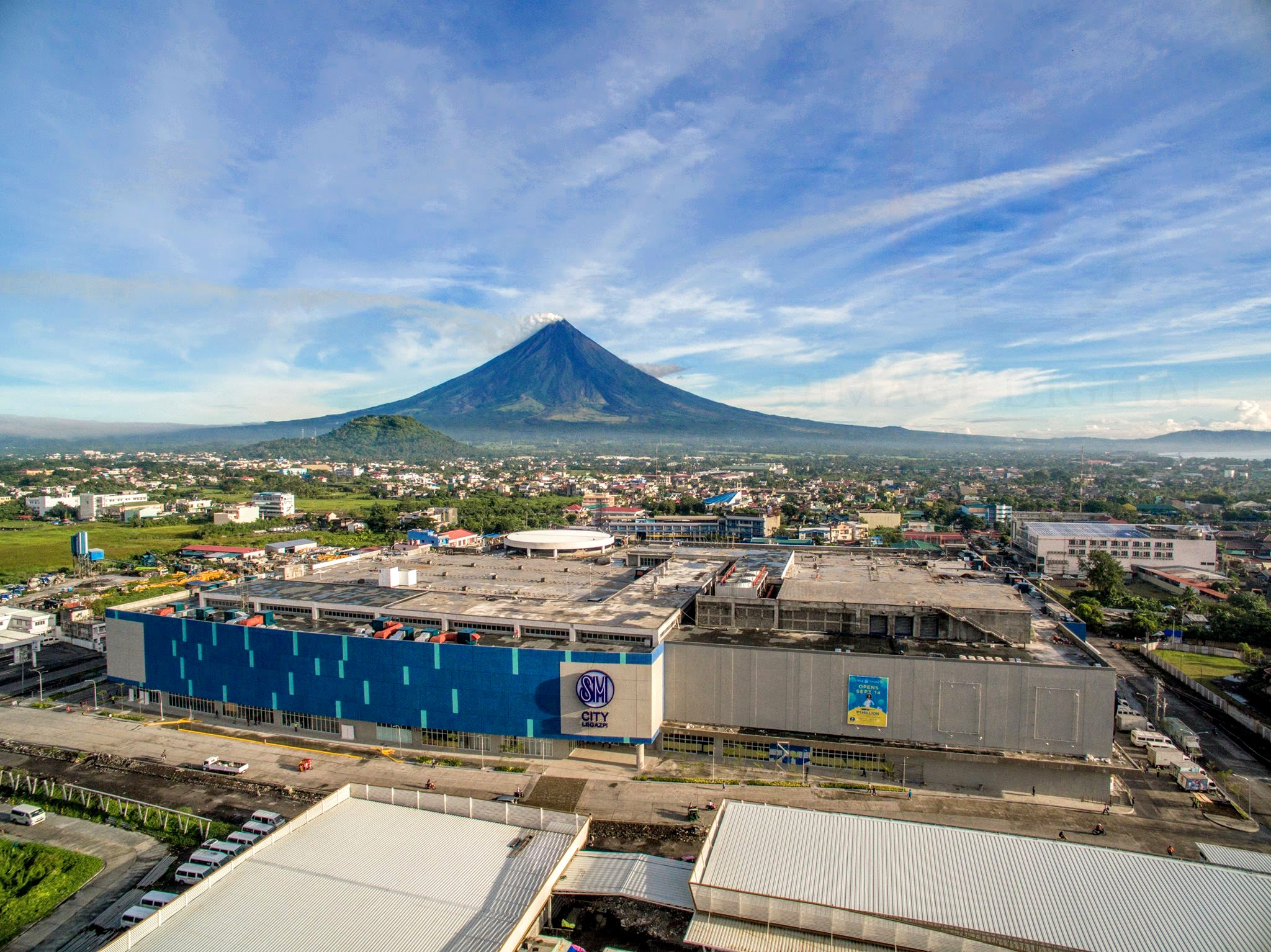
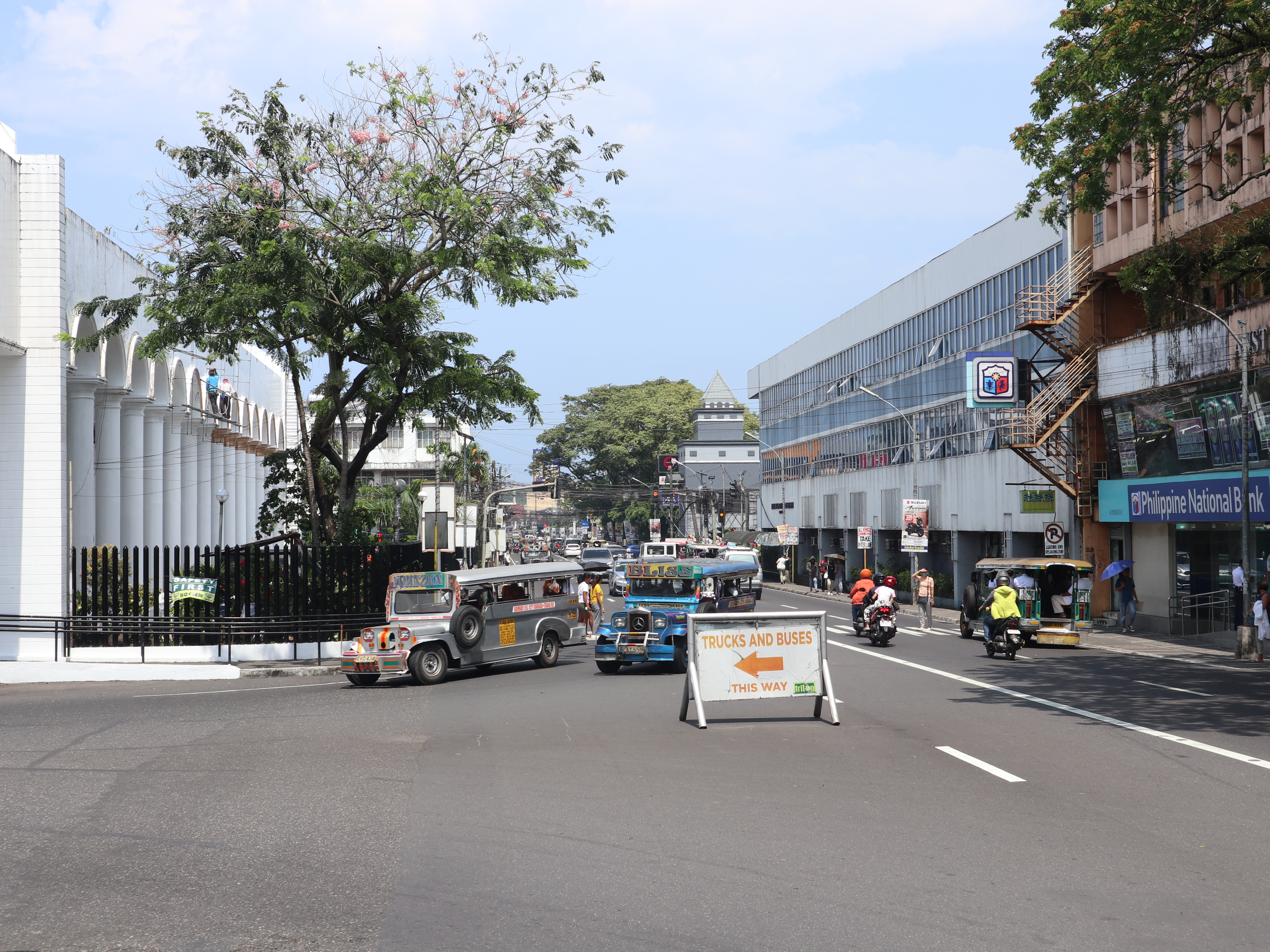
- From top, left to right: Mayon Volcano, Daraga Church in Daraga, Tabaco Church in Tabaco, SM City Legazpi, Old Albay District

- Flag Seal
- Nicknames: Home of the Majestic Mayon Volcano
- Anthem: "Albay Forever"
- Location in the Philippines
- Interactive map of Albay
- Coordinates: 13°14′N 123°38′E
- Country: Philippines
- Region: Bicol Region
- Founded: April 3, 1574
- Capital and largest city: Legazpi

Government
  - Governor: Noel E. Rosal (PDP-Laban)
  - Vice Governor: Farida 'Diday' S. Co (Lakas)
  - Legislature: Albay Provincial Board
  - Electorate: 940,114 voters (2025)

Area
  - Total: 2,575.77 km^{2} (994.51 sq mi)
  - Rank: 52nd out of 82
- Highest elevation (Mount Mayon): 2,463 m (8,081 ft)

Population (2024 census)
  - Total: 1,379,398
  - Rank: 21st out of 82
  - Density: 535.528/km^{2} (1,387.01/sq mi)
  - Rank: 12th out of 82
  - Households: 275,601
- Demonym: Albayano; Albaynon

Divisions
  - Independent cities: 0
  - Component cities: 3: Legazpi; Ligao; Tabaco
  - Municipalities: 15: Bacacay; Camalig; Daraga; Guinobatan; Jovellar; Libon; Malilipot; Malinao; Manito; Oas; Pio Duran; Polangui; Rapu-Rapu; Santo Domingo; Tiwi
  - Barangays: 720
  - Districts: Legislative districts of Albay

Economy
  - Income class: 1st provincial income class
  - Poverty incidence: 18.1% (2023)
  - Revenue: ₱ 3,086 million (2024)
  - Assets: ₱ 12,119 million (2024)
  - Expenditure: ₱ 3,214 million (2024)
  - Liabilities: ₱ 1,908 million (2024)
- Time zone: UTC+8 (PST)
- PSGC: 050500000
- IDD : area code: +63 (0)52
- ISO 3166 code: PH-ALB
- Spoken languages: Central Bikol; Tagalog; English
- Website: albay.gov.ph

Albay (IPA: [ɐlˈbaɪ]), officially the Province of Albay (Central Bikol: Probinsya kan Albay; Tagalog: Lalawigan ng Albay) is a province in the Bicol Region of the Philippines, mostly on the southeastern part of the island of Luzon. Its capital (and largest city) is the city of Legazpi, the regional center of the whole Bicol Region, which is located in the southern foothill of Mayon Volcano.

The province was added to the UNESCO World Network of Biosphere Reserves in March 2016.

== History ==
=== Early history ===
Long before the Spaniards arrived, Albay had a thriving civilization. Formerly called Ibat, and then Libog, Albay was once ruled by Gat Ibal, an old chief who also founded the old barangay of Sawangan, now part of the City of Legazpi. Historian William Henry Scott wrote that in the local epic called siday entitled "Bingi of Lawan", an Albay datu by the name of Dumaraog went to Lawan (present-day Laoang, Northern Samar) to ask for the hands of Bingi bringing with him 100 ships. Datu Iberein came from the settlement of Lawan. He was described by Scott as a “Samar datu by the name of Iberein was rowed out to a Spanish vessel anchored in his harbor in 1543 by oarsmen collared in gold; while wearing on his own person earrings and chains.”

=== Spanish colonial era ===
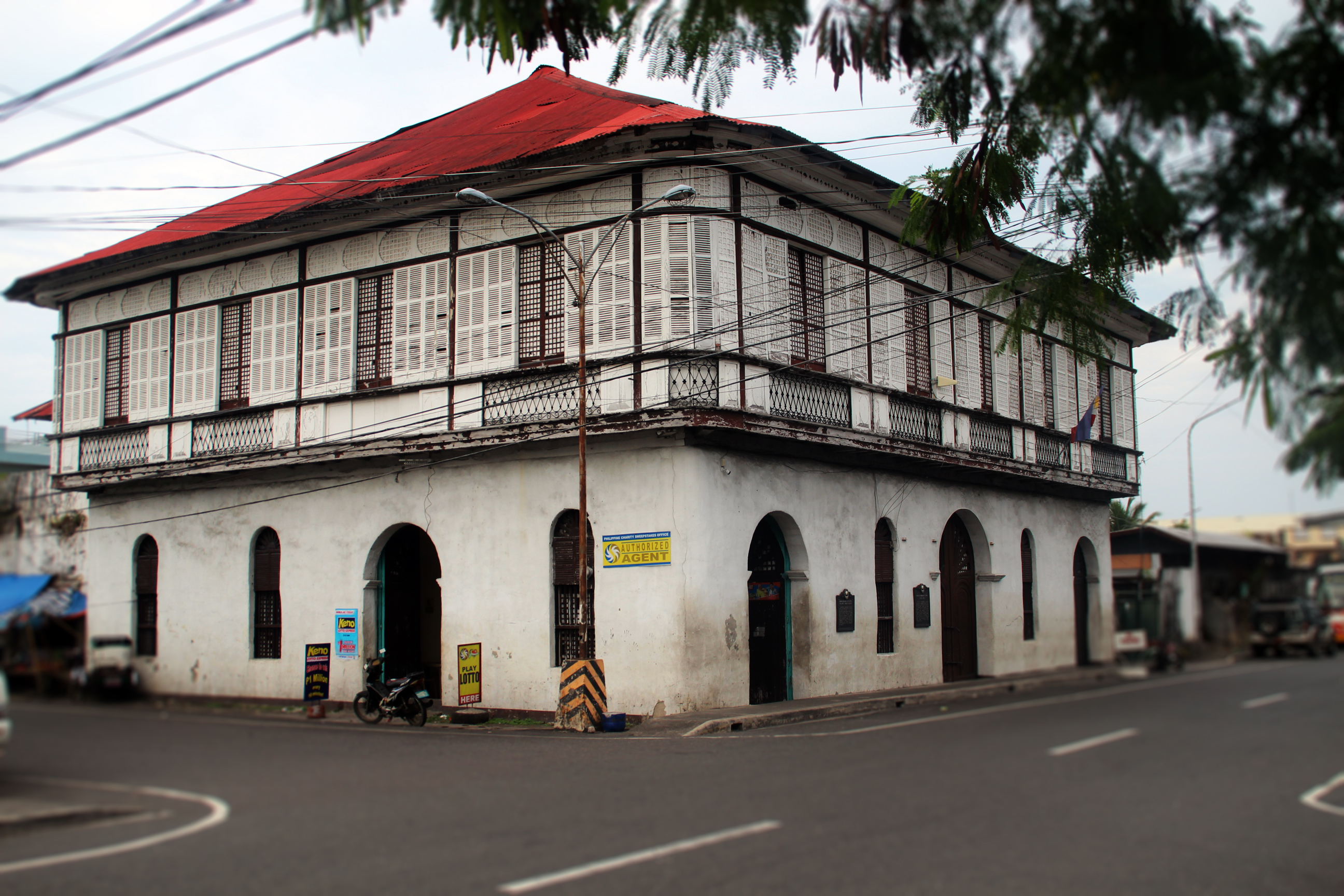
Manalang Ancestral House, an authentic Bahay na bato in Tabaco City.

In July 1569, Luis Enriquez de Guzman, a member of the expedition led by Maestro de Campo Mateo de Saz and Captain Martin de Goiti, led a group that crossed from Burias and Ticao islands and landed on a coastal settlement called Ibalon in what is now the province of Sorsogon. From this point, another expedition was sent to explore the interior and founded the town of Camalig.

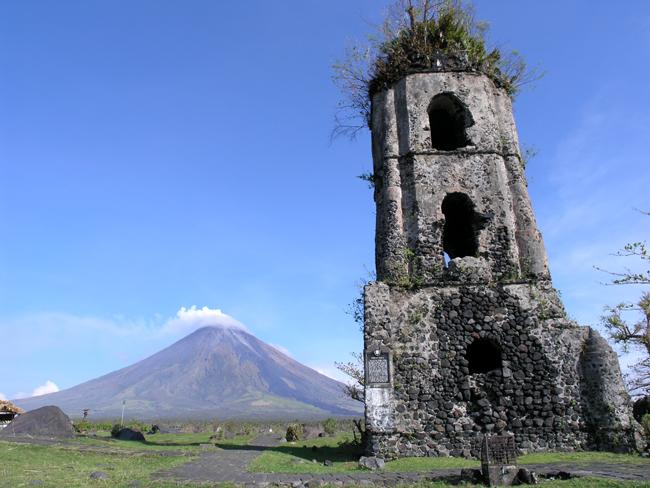
Cagsawa Ruins, a preliminary excavation of the Cagsawa ruins by the Bulacan State University, show that the Spanish incorporated Mesoamerican influences in constructing the complex.

In 1573, Juan de Salcedo penetrated the Bicol Peninsula from the north as far south as Libon, establishing the settlement of Santiago de Libon. Jose Maria Peñaranda, a military engineer, was made “corregidor” of the province on May 14, 1834. He constructed public buildings and built roads and bridges.

The entire Bicol peninsula was organized as one province with two divisions, Camarines in the northwest and Ibalon in the southeast. In 1636, the two partidos were separated, and Ibalon became a separate province with Sorsogon as the capital. In the 17th century, Moro slave raiders from the southern Philippines ravaged the northeastern coastal areas of the province of Albay. By the end of the 1700s, Albay had 12,339 native families and 146 Spanish Filipino families. In the 1800s, the natives numbered 103,955 whereas the mestizos numbered 2,598; this, further broken down to 579 Spanish-Mestizos and 933 Chinese-Mestizos.

By year 1818, a new census which included the islands of Masbate, Catanduanes, and Ticao, under the province of Albay yielded the presence 35,321 native families and 1,334 Spanish-Filipino families, all under Albay's jurisdiction. The distribution of the Spanish-Filipino families are as follows: 4 (Manito), 45 (Bacon, now part of Sorsogon), 52 (Gubat), 28 (Casiguran), 18 (Juban), 149 (Sorsogon), 19 (Bulusan), 16 (Bulan), 55 (Quipia), 77 (Bacacay), 53 (Malilipot), 225 (Tabaco, named after the Native American Tobacco plant), 241 (Malinao), 157 (Tibi), 18 (Lagonoy), and 114 (San Jose, now part of Malilipot). Outside of the Albay mainland in the surrounding islands; Ticao island had 8 Spanish families, Masbate island had 1 Spanish family, and Catanduanes had 150 Spanish families.

Mayon Volcano, in one of its most violent eruptions, destroyed the five towns surrounding its base on February 1, 1814. This eruption forced the town of Cagsawa to relocate to its present site, Legazpi.

A decree was issued by Governor-General Narciso Claveria in 1846 separating Masbate, Ticao, and Burias from Albay to form the comandancia of Masbate. Albay was then divided into four districts: Iraya, Tabaco, Sorsogon, and Catanduanes.

==== Philippine revolution ====
Glicerio Delgado, a condemned insurecto (insurgent), started revolutionary activities in the province. With a headquarters in the mountain of Guinobatan town, he joined the revolutionary government of Albay as a lieutenant in the infantry.

A unit of the Philippine Militia was then organized by the Spanish military authorities. Mariano Riosa was appointed major of the Tabaco Zone, which comprised all the towns along the seacoast from Albay to Tiwi while Anacieto Solano was appointed major for the Iraya Zone, which was made up of the towns from Daraga to Libon. Each town was organized into sections of fifty men under the command of a lieutenant.

During the Philippine Revolution on September 22, 1898, the provisional revolutionary government of Albay was formed with Anacieto Solano as provisional president. Major General Vito Belarmino, the appointed military commander, reorganized the Filipino Army in the province.

=== American colonial era ===
Following the Spanish–American War, the new colonial power the United States did not recognize the country's independence, which had been declared in June 1898, and the Americans subsequently acquired direct control of the country as a de facto colony, under the terms of the Treaty of Paris (1898), over which the Filipinos had no say. During the Philippine–American War, Brigadier General William August Kobbé headed the expedition that landed at the ports of Sorsogon, Bulan and Donsol. From there, the Americans marched to Legazpi and captured it.

Although a civil government was established in Albay on April 26, 1901, Colonel Harry Hill Bandholtz, Commanding Officer of the Constabulary in the Bicol Region, said that General Simeon Ola, with a thousand men, continued to defy American authority after the capture of Belarmino in 1901. Ola was later captured with about six hundred of his men.

=== Japanese occupation ===
Following the December 12, 1941, Japanese invasion of Legazpi during the Second World War, the Kimura Detachment of the Imperial Japanese Army occupied Albay. The province was defended only by the Philippine Constabulary unit under the command of Major Francisco Sandico.

During the Japanese Occupation, the military general headquarters of the Commonwealth Army of the Philippines remained active from January 3, 1942, to June 30, 1946, and the 5th Constabulary Regiment of the Philippine Constabulary was established from October 28, 1944, to June 30, 1946, and stationed in Albay. Then came the clearing operations and anti-Japanese insurgency in the Bicol Peninsula, helped by the local Bicolano resistance. Some Bicolano guerrilla groups invaded around the province of Albay during the Japanese Insurgencies between 1942 and 1944 and were supported by local Filipino troops under the Philippine Commonwealth Army and pre-war Philippine Constabulary 5th Infantry Regiments attacking the enemy soldiers of the Japanese Imperial Army. In the aftermath of three years of siege and conflicts, many Bicolano guerrillas were forced to retreat by the Japanese around the province before liberation in 1945 by Allied forces.

=== Martial law era ===
Oas, Albay, was one of the localities particularly harmed by the Dictatorship of Ferdinand Marcos; in the waning days of the dictatorship, Oas was hit by a series of political killings targeting those who dared to speak out against the abuses of the Military and against Ferdinand Marcos.

The most prominent of the victims was Clemente Ragragio, the municipal sanitation inspector of Ligao who was later also assigned to Oas. Known for his effectiveness, he had been awarded the 1983 Best Sanitary Inspector for Albay. However, this led the dictatorship's local administrators suspecting him of being a rebel sympathizer, because his close relationship with locals in far-flung barangays allowed him to move around fearlessly, and because he expressed disagreements with the dictatorship's governance. A killer shot him three times in front of his house in the early evening of August 21, 1985, and the government did not investigate his murder. He was later honored by having his name inscribed on the wall of remembrance at the Philippines' Bantayog ng mga Bayani (lit. Monument of Heroes), which honors the martyrs and heroes who fought to restore democracy in the wake of the Marcos dictatorship.

== Geography ==
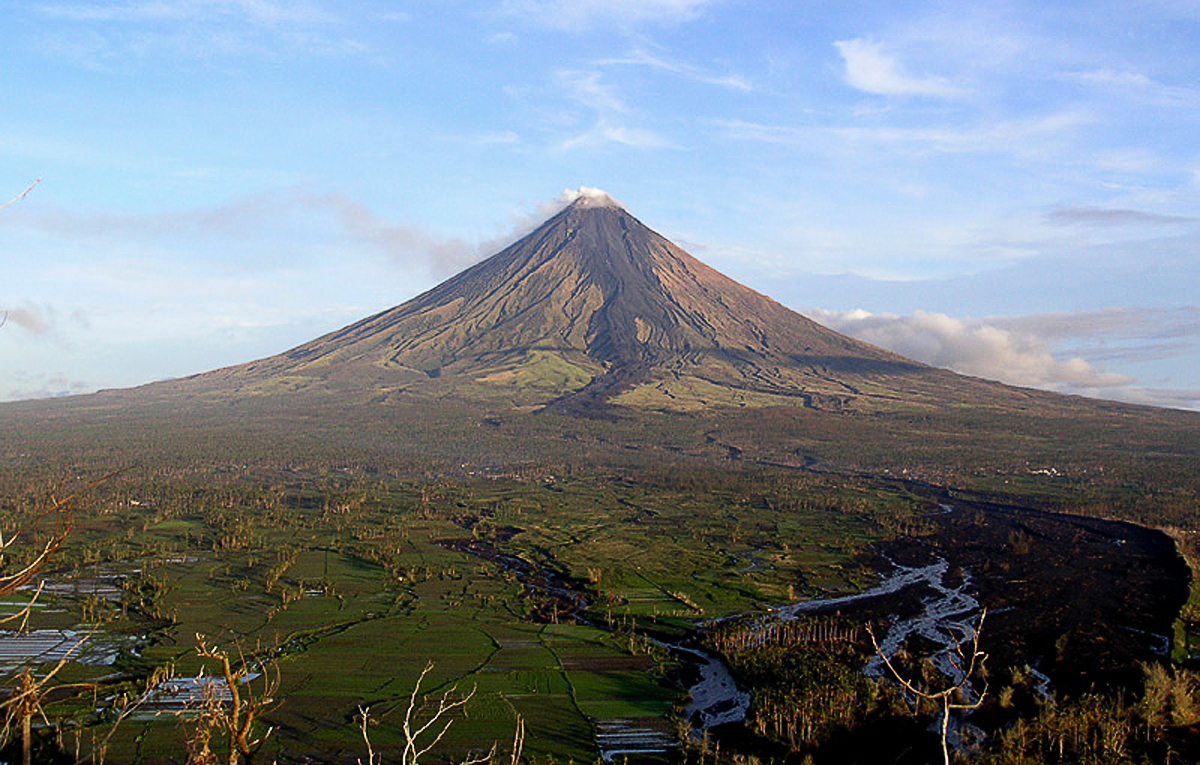
The Mayon Volcano dominates the geography of Albay.

Albay has a total land area of 2,575.77 square kilometres (994.51 sq mi), which makes it the 53rd biggest province. The province is bordered by the provinces of Camarines Sur to the north and Sorsogon to the south. To the northeast lies Lagonoy Gulf, which separates the province from Catanduanes. To the southwest of the province is the Burias Pass with the island of Burias of Masbate province located about 14 kilometres (8.7 mi) offshore.

In 2016, an area of 250,000 hectares (620,000 acres) was declared a UNESCO Biosphere Reserve. The Albay Biosphere Reserve is home to 182 terrestrial plant species, of which 46 are endemic to the Philippines. Its marine waters and coastal area also provide habitat to five of the world's seven marine turtle species, as well as mangrove, seagrass and seaweed ecosystems.

=== Topography ===
The province is generally mountainous with scattered fertile plains and valleys. On the eastern part of the province is a line of volcanic mountains starting with the northernmost Malinao in Tiwi, followed by Mount Masaraga and the free-standing Mayon Volcano. Separated by the Poliqui Bay is the Pocdol Mountains in the town of Manito.

The stratovolcano of Mayon standing at around 2,462 metres (8,077 ft), is the highest point of the province. It is the most famous landform in Albay and in the whole Bicol Region. This active volcano falls under the jurisdiction of eight municipalities and cities of Albay: Camalig, Daraga, Guinobatan, Legazpi City, Ligao City, Malilipot, Santo Domingo, and Tabaco City.

The western coast of the province is mountainous but not as prominent as the eastern range with the highest elevation at around 490 metres (1,610 ft). Among these mountains are Mount Catburawan in Ligao and Mount Pantao in Oas.

=== Administrative divisions ===
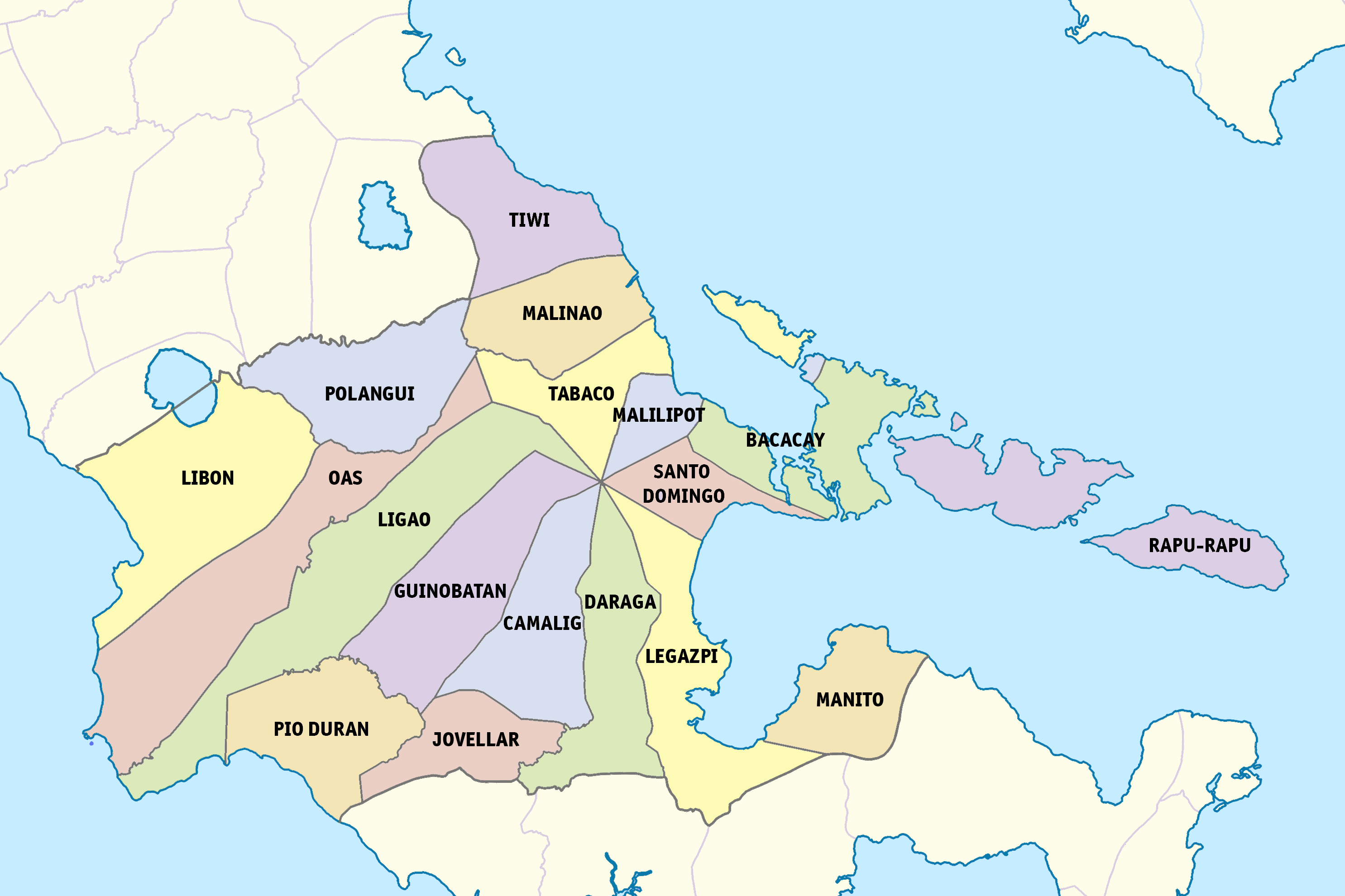
Political map of Albay

Albay comprises 15 municipalities/towns and three component cities (Legazpi, Ligao and Tabaco).

- † Capital city
- ∗ Component city
- Municipality

City or municipality (Note: The globe icon marks the city/town center.)	District	Population			±% p.a.	Area		Density (2020)		Barangays	Coordinates^{[A]}
		(2024)		(2020)		km^{2}	sq mi	/km^{2}	/sq mi		
Bacacay	1st	5.2%	72,298	72,485	−0.05%	122.13	47.15	590	1,500	56	13°17′33″N 123°47′28″E
Camalig	2nd	5.3%	73,087	72,042	+0.27%	130.90	50.54	560	1,500	50	13°10′53″N 123°39′19″E
Daraga	2nd	10.0%	138,000	133,893	+0.58%	118.64	45.81	1,200	3,100	54	13°08′52″N 123°42′47″E
Guinobatan	3rd	6.1%	84,420	85,786	−0.31%	244.43	94.37	350	910	44	13°11′29″N 123°35′59″E
Jovellar	3rd	1.3%	17,538	17,795	−0.28%	105.40	40.70	170	440	23	13°04′08″N 123°36′01″E
Legazpi City †	2nd	15.3%	210,616	209,533	+0.10%	153.70	59.34	1,400	3,600	70	13°08′20″N 123°44′03″E
Libon	3rd	5.2%	72,135	75,073	−0.76%	222.76	86.01	320	830	47	13°17′59″N 123°26′18″E
Ligao *	3rd	8.7%	119,779	118,096	+0.27%	246.75	95.27	490	1,300	55	13°14′28″N 123°32′14″E
Malilipot	1st	3.0%	41,066	40,857	+0.10%	44.13	17.04	930	2,400	18	13°19′08″N 123°44′21″E
Malinao	1st	3.6%	49,570	47,359	+0.87%	107.50	41.51	460	1,200	29	13°23′51″N 123°42′18″E
Manito	2nd	1.9%	26,425	26,162	+0.19%	107.40	41.47	250	650	15	13°07′28″N 123°52′11″E
Oas	3rd	4.7%	64,890	66,084	−0.35%	263.61	101.78	250	650	53	13°15′27″N 123°30′01″E
Pio Duran	3rd	3.5%	48,713	49,070	−0.14%	133.70	51.62	360	930	33	13°02′34″N 123°27′13″E
Polangui	3rd	6.5%	89,344	89,176	+0.04%	145.30	56.10	610	1,600	44	13°17′37″N 123°29′03″E
Rapu-Rapu	2nd	2.6%	36,281	36,151	+0.07%	155.30	59.96	230	600	34	13°11′10″N 124°07′33″E
Santo Domingo	1st	2.7%	37,586	37,765	−0.09%	51.22	19.78	730	1,900	23	13°14′14″N 123°46′39″E
Tabaco *	1st	10.2%	140,779	140,961	−0.02%	117.14	45.23	1,200	3,100	47	13°21′33″N 123°43′47″E
Tiwi	1st	4.1%	56,871	56,444	+0.14%	105.76	40.83	540	1,400	25	13°27′25″N 123°40′47″E
TOTAL			1,379,389	1,374,768	+0.08%	2,574.91	994.18	540	1,400	720	
† Provincial capital and component city Municipality ∗ Component city
1. Coordinates mark the city/town center, and are sortable by latitude.

== Demographics ==
The population of Albay in the 2024 census was 1,379,398 people,, making it the 20th most populous province in the country. It had a density of 540 inhabitants per square kilometre or 1,400 inhabitants per square mile. Based on the 2007 census, there were 208,640 households in the province with an average size of 5.22 persons, significantly higher than the national average of 4.99.

Population census of Albay

Year	Pop.	±% p.a.
1903	237,621	—
1918	323,234	+2.07%
1939	432,465	+1.40%
1948	394,694	−1.01%
1960	514,980	+2.24%
1970	673,981	+2.72%
1975	728,827	+1.58%
1980	809,177	+2.11%

Year	Pop.	±% p.a.
1990	903,785	+1.11%
1995	1,005,315	+2.01%
2000	1,090,907	+1.77%
2007	1,187,185	+1.17%
2010	1,233,432	+1.40%
2015	1,314,826	+1.22%
2020	1,374,768	+0.94%
2024	1,379,398	+0.08%

Figures before 1948 exclude areas that became part of Catanduanes.
Sources: PSA

=== Religion ===
Prior to colonization, the region had a complex religious system that involved various deities. These deities include: Gugurang, the supreme god who dwells inside of Mount Mayon where he guards and protects the sacred fire that his brother Aswang was trying to steal. Whenever people disobey his orders, wishes and commit numerous sins, he would cause Mount Mayon to burst lava as a sign of warning for people to mend their crooked ways. Ancient Bikolanos had a rite performed for him called Atang. Asuang, the evil god who always tries to steal the sacred fire of Mount Mayon from his brother, Gugurang. Addressed sometimes as Aswang, he dwells mainly inside Mount Malinao. As an evil god, he would cause the people to suffer misfortunes and commit sins. Enemy of Gugurang and a friend of Bulan the god of the Moon; Haliya, the masked goddess of the moonlight and the archenemy of Bakunawa and protector of Bulan. Her cult is composed primarily of women. There is also a ritual dance named after her as it is performed to be a countermeasure against Bakunawa.; Bulan, the god of the pale moon, he is depicted as a pubescent boy with uncommon comeliness that made savage beast and the vicious mermaids (Magindara) tame. He has deep affection towards Magindang, but plays with him by running away so that Magindang would never catch him. The reason for this is because he is shy to the man that he loves. If Magindang manages to catch Bulan, Haliya always comes to free him from Magindang's grip; Magindang, the god of the sea and all its creatures. He has deep affection to the lunar god Bulan and pursues him despite never catching him. Due to this, the Bicolanos reasoned that it is to why the waves rise to reach the Moon when seen from the distant horizon. Whenever he does catch up to Bulan, Haliya comes to rescue Bulan and free him immediately; Okot, god of forest and hunting; and Bakunawa, a gigantic sea serpent deity who is often considered as the cause of eclipses, the devourer of the Sun and the Moon, and an adversary of Haliya as Bakunawa's main aim is to swallow Bulan, who Haliya swore to protect for all of eternity.

==== Catholicism ====
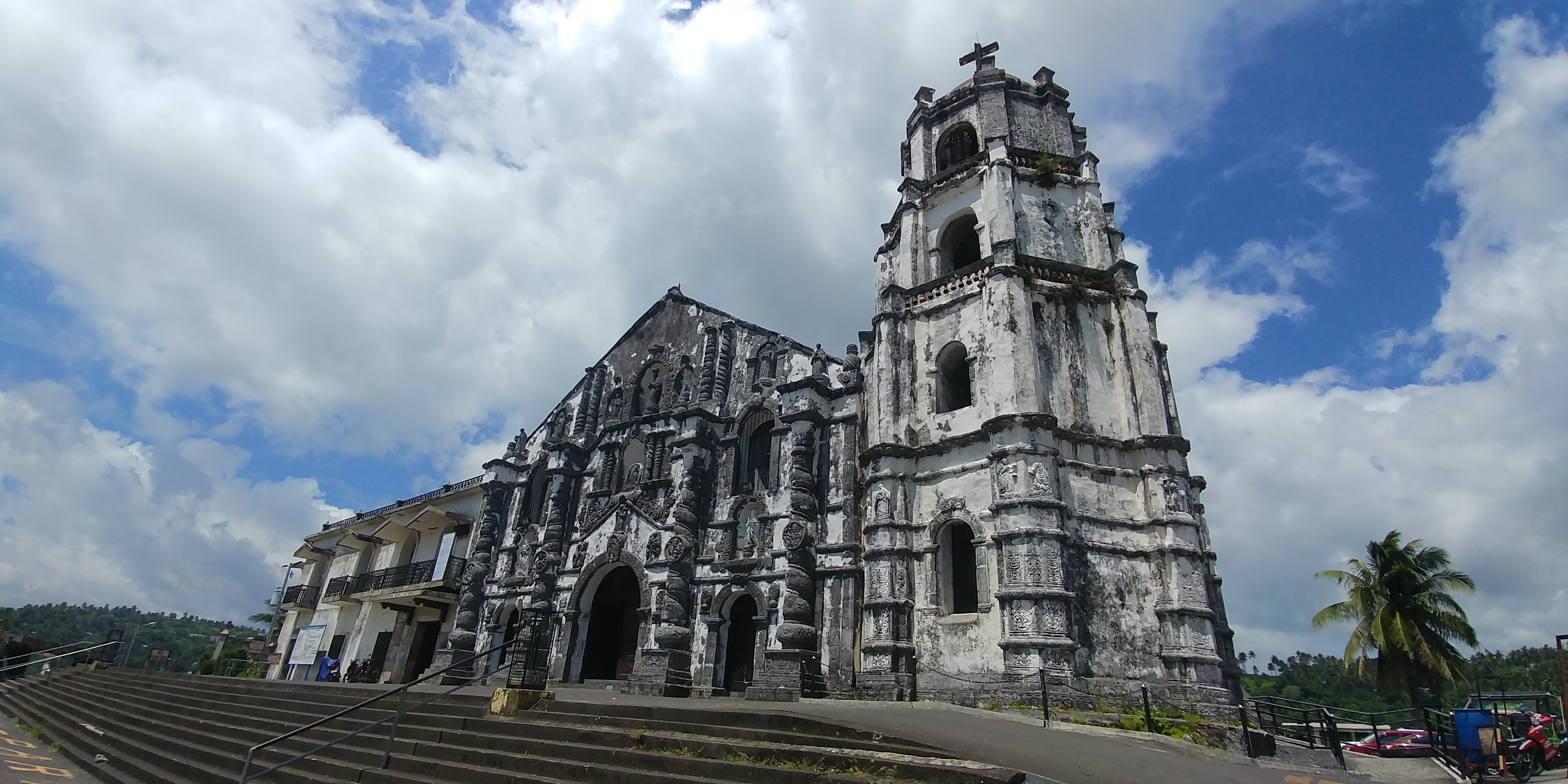
Nuestra Señora de la Porteria Church in Daraga, built in 1773

Catholicism is the predominant religion in the province, affiliated by 96.1% of the men and 95.7% of the women of Albay. Each town has its own fiesta for their patrons and patronesses.

==== Others ====
Other religious denominations are the Iglesia ni Cristo (INC) has 2 percent of the province, other Protestant churches such as the Baptist Church, Methodist, other Evangelical Christians, Seventh-day Adventists, Mormons, Jehovah's Witnesses as well as Islam.

=== Languages ===
Albay is home to several languages and host to different native languages of Bicol Region. Out of seven Bikol languages (excluding the Bisakol languages, which are Bisayan languages), only Pandan Bikol of northern Catanduanes is not used or which the origin is not from Albay. The languages in the province are very diverse which includes the languages of Albay Bikol group which comprises the languages of West Miraya, East Miraya, Libon and Buhinon. Of the four Albay Bikol languages, Buhinon is the only one not used in Albay but rather in Buhi, Camarines Sur.

Rinconada Bikol is a minority language in the province and used by people in barangays of Libon and Polangui that are near the boundary of Bato and Iriga in Camarines Sur. Another primary language used in the province is Central Bikol which is the native tongue of the population on the eastern coast of the Bicol Peninsula. Both Albay Bikol languages and Rinconada Bikol are members of Inland Bikol group of languages while Central Bikol is a language member of Coastal Bikol. The Tabaco - Legazpi - Sorsogon dialect of Central Bikol is spoken in Legazpi, Tabaco and neighboring municipalities on the east side of Albay, and some parts of northern Sorsogon (especially in Sorsogon City).

The majority of the inhabitants also understand English and Filipino as second languages.

== Economy ==
Poverty incidence of Albay (%)

Source: Philippine Statistics Authority

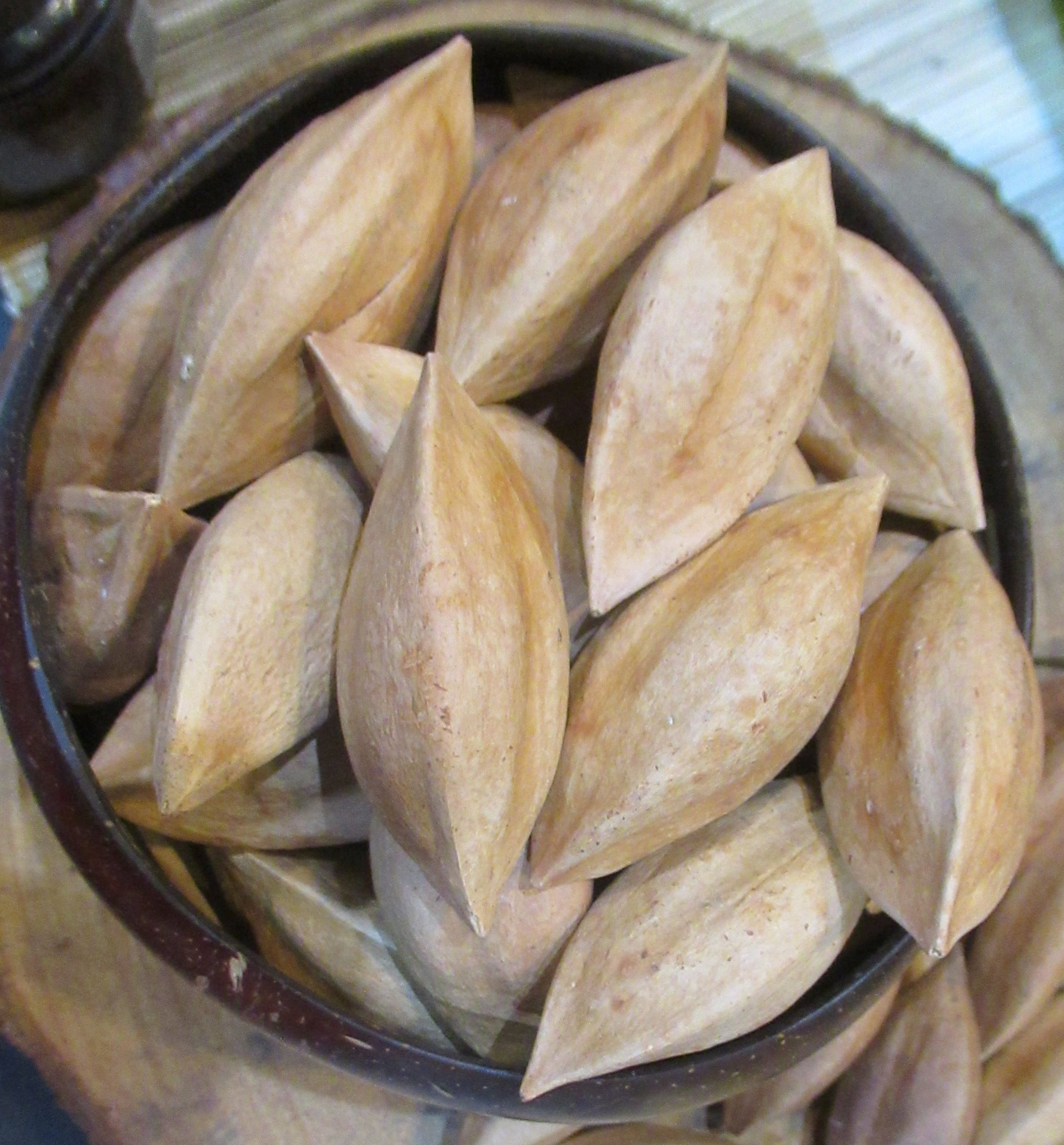
Pili nuts (unshelled)

Agriculture is the main industry in Albay, which produces crops like coconut, rice, sugar and abacá. Handicrafts are the major source of rural income and comprises a fairly large share in the small-scale industries of the province. Forestry, cement production and paper-making are other sources of livelihood. The manufacture of abacá products such as Manila hemp, hats, bags, mats, furniture, home decors, and slippers is one of the main sources of income in the rural areas. Production of abaca fiber experienced a boom from the late 1800s until the American period. Fishing is the main livelihood along both shores of the province. Tourism, especially related to Mayon Volcano, also creates income for Albay. For the year 2013, Albay had a total of 339,445 foreign tourist arrivals.

In the December, 2023 Pili Fiesta, Director Marita A. Carlos of DOST-PCAARRD introduced technologies on pili (C. ovatum tree) production in Albay, Bicol Region. She aimed to promote pili as a flagship industry.

== Government ==
Albay has three congressional districts encompassing its 15 municipalities and 3 component cities.

District	Representative	City or municipality	District population (2024)
1st District (Coastal District)	Krisel B. Lagman	Bacacay; Malilipot; Malinao; Santo Domingo; Tabaco; Tiwi	398,050
2nd District (Capital District)	Carlos A. Loria	Camalig; Daraga; Legazpi; Manito; Rapu-Rapu	484,409
3rd District (Miraya District)	Adrian E. Salceda	Guinobatan; Jovellar; Libon; Ligao; Oas; Pio Duran; Polangui	499,589

Current Provincial Government Officials (2025–2028)

- Governor: Noel E. Rosal (PDP-Laban)
- Vice-Governor: Farida "Diday" S. Co (Lakas)

Sangguniang Panlalawigan Members

1st District

- Sheina Marie C. Onrubia-DelaCruz (Liberal)
- John Gio O. Bongao (Liberal)
- Marian Caroline Z. So (Lakas)

2nd District

- Melisssa A. Armedilla (Lakas)
- Gleen Casulla (Lakas)
- Harold O. Imperial (PDP-Laban

3rd District

- Juan Miguel Ricardo S. Salceda (Lakas)
- Brayan Arandia (Lakas)
- Emmanuel Ribaya (Lakas)
- Wilfredo Maronilla (Lakas)

Ex-Officio Members

- Milagros B. Bal (President, LNB)
- Patricia Gonzales-Alsua (President, PCL)
- Carlos Matthew Gamboa (President, Panlalawigang Pederasyon ng Sangguniang Kabataan)

=== House of Representatives ===
District	Representative	Party	Term	Bloc
1st	Cielo Krisel B. Lagman	Liberal	1	Minority
2nd	Carlos A. Loria	NUP	1	Majority
3rd	Raymund Adrian E. Salceda	Lakas	1	Majority

== Transportation ==
=== Roads ===
Albay has 383.22 kilometers (238.12 mi) of national roads, mostly paved with asphalt, with 5.25 kilometers (3.26 mi) remaining unpaved. Maharlika Highway (N1/AH26) serves as the principal road connection between other provinces. Most of the province is served by secondary national roads, assigned route numbers in the series, namely Bicol-630 and Bicol-640. Almost all of the cities and municipalities are connected by national roads, except for Rapu-Rapu.

In order to spur development in the province, the Toll Regulatory Board declared Toll Road 5 the extension of South Luzon Expressway. A 420-kilometer, four lane expressway starting from the terminal point of the now under construction SLEX Toll Road 4 at Barangay Mayao, Lucena City in Quezon to Matnog, Sorsogon, near the Matnog Ferry Terminal. On August 25, 2020, San Miguel Corporation announced that they will invest the project which will reduce travel time from Lucena to Matnog from 9 hours to 5.5 hours.

=== Water transport ===
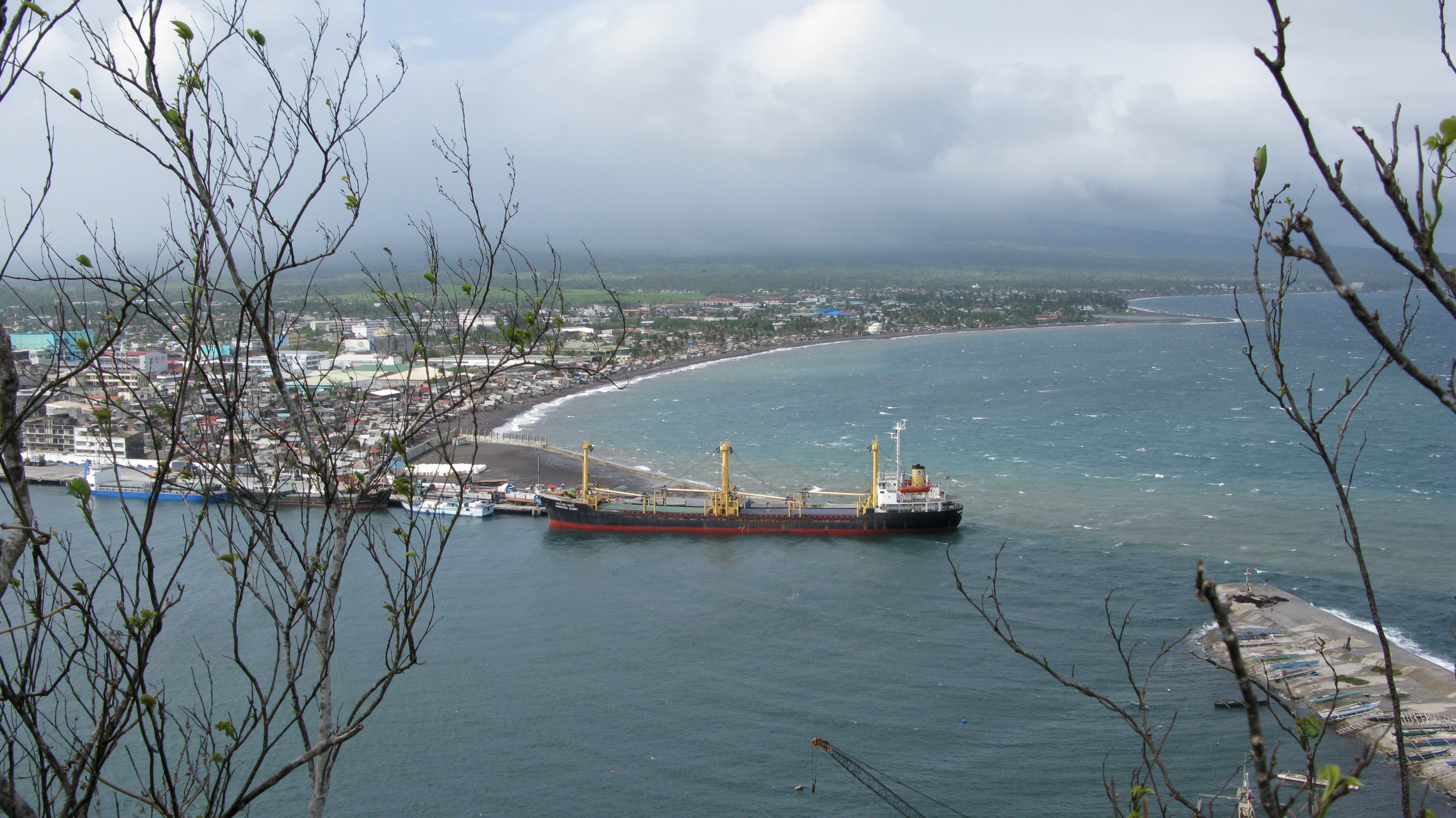
Legazpi harbour and port

Albay is the region's principal trans-shipment point with its ports: Tabaco International Port, Legazpi National Port, Pio Duran Provincial Port, and the Pantao Regional Port.

=== Air transport ===
Traveling to the province by air is served by the Bicol International Airport in the municipality of Daraga, adjacent municipality of Legazpi City. The airport is the province's gateway from Manila and Cebu City in the Visayas. The province was formerly served by the now defunct Legazpi Airport.

=== Railroads ===
Albay is served by the mainline of the Philippine National Railways (PNR), and has commuter service between Naga in Camarines Sur. Trains to Manila (Tutuban), the Mayon Limited, is suspended from November 2012. Four stations serve Polangui, Ligao, Guinobatan, and Legazpi, respectively.

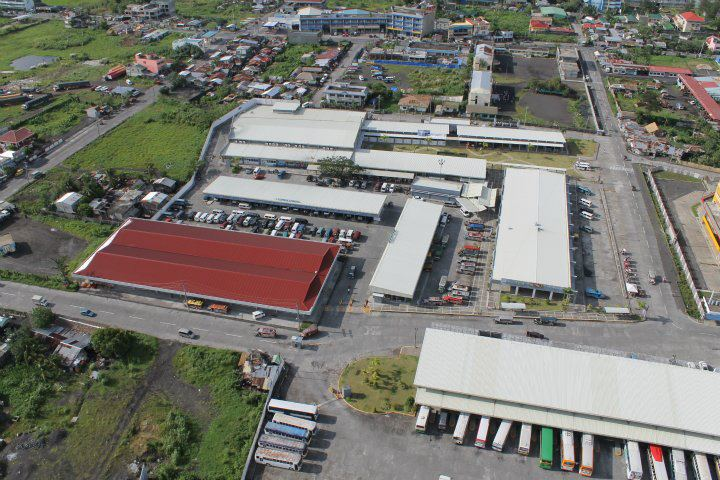
Aerial view of the Legazpi Grand Central Terminal

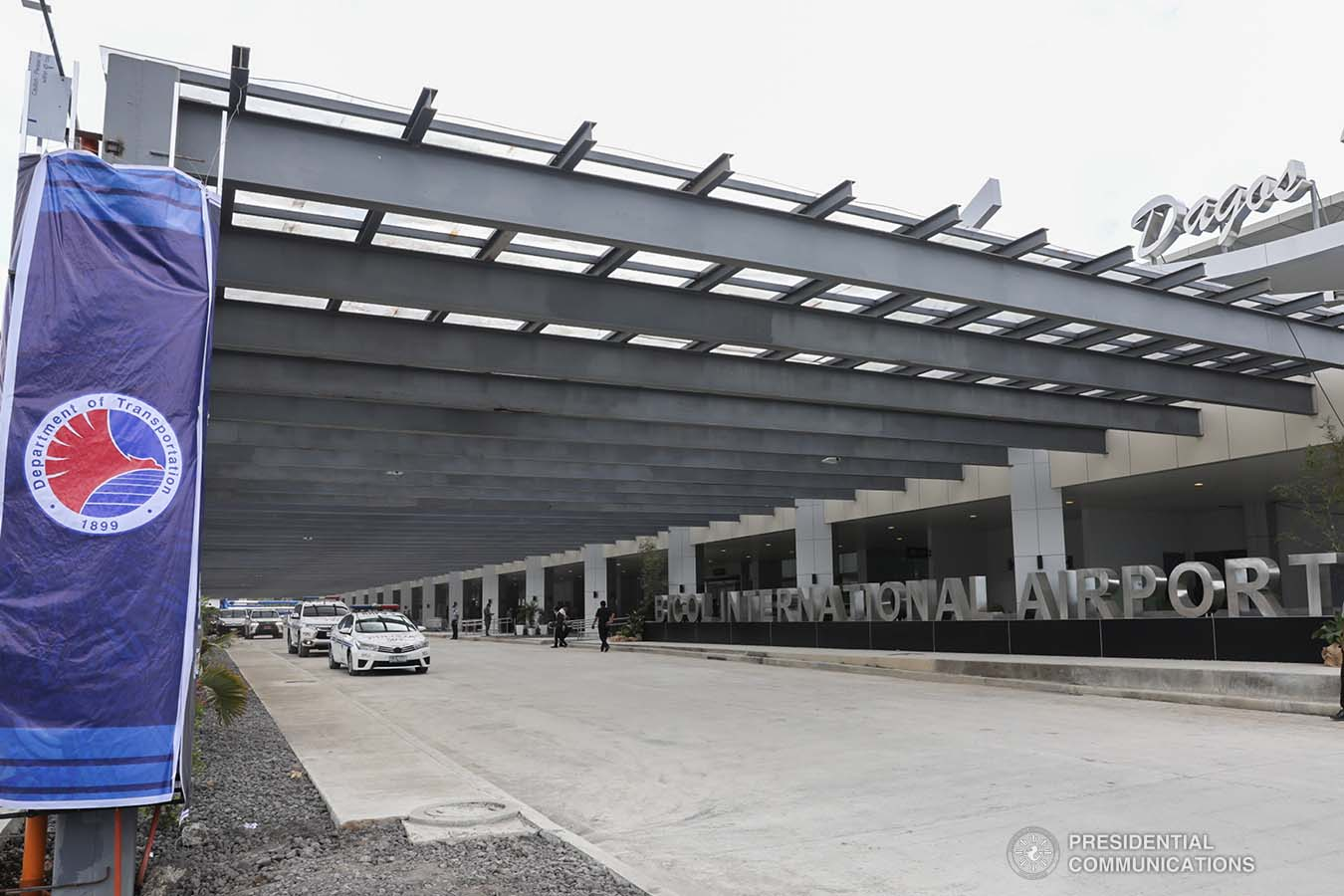
Front area of the Bicol International Airport Terminal Building

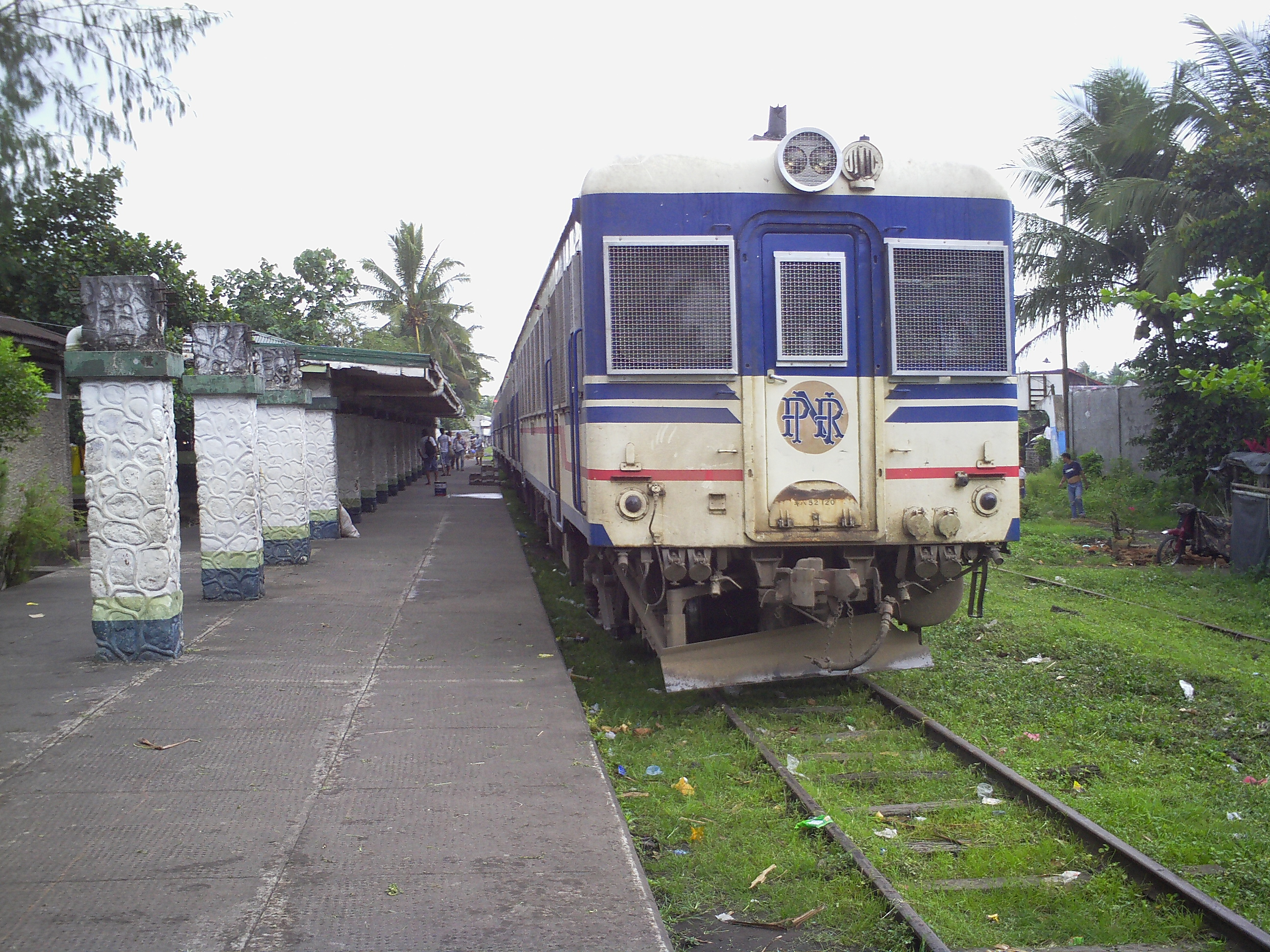
A PNR train in Ligao railway station

== Education ==
The Philippine elementary school begins in Grades 1 to 6. The high school program takes six years, from Grades 7 through to 12, taken after graduating from elementary school. It has two large universities and several colleges and institutes, each with a number of college branches mostly throughout the capital, Legazpi City, and more than a dozen other schools and universities specializing in various courses such as Medicine, Engineering, Nautical courses, Nursing, Law, Commerce, Education, Computer and IT and other professions.

The most prominent of these universities are (in alphabetical order):

- Bicol University
- University of Santo Tomas-Legazpi

Other higher educational institutions:

- ABEC - Institute of Business and Technology, Inc.
- Ago Medical and Educational Center–Bicol Christian College of Medicine
- AMA Computer College
- Bicol College
- Computer Communication Development Institute, Inc
- Computer Systems Institute
- Divine Word College of Legazpi
- Forbes College
- Mariners' Polytechnic Colleges Foundation
- Meriam College of Technology, Inc.
- South East-Asia Institute of Trade and Technology Legazpi
- Southern Luzon Technological College Foundation, Inc.
- STI College
- Tanchuling College

Local colleges in Albay:

- Bacacay Community College
- Camalig Community College (2026)
- City College of Legazpi
- Community College of Manito
- Daraga Community College
- Guinobatan Community College
- Libon Community College
- Ligao Community College
- Malinao Community College (2027)
- Oas Community College
- Polangui Community College
- Rapu-Rapu Community College
- San Jose Community College
- Sto. Domingo Community College
- Tiwi Community College

=== Basic education ===
The Regional Office of the Department of Education - Region V-Bicol is located at the Regional Site, Rawis, Legazpi City 4500.

- Regional Director: GILBERT T. SADSAD, CESO III
- Assistant Regional Director - Vacant

Division of Albay:

- SDS - Nene Rosal-Merioles, CESO V
- ASDS - Bernie C. Despabiladero, CESO VI
- ASDS - Marivic P. Diaz, CESO VI

Division of Legazpi City:

- SDS - Danilo E. Despi, CESO V
- ASDS - Lauro B. Millano, CESO VI

Division of Ligao City:

- SDS - Nympha D. Guemo, CESO V
- ASDS - Melchizedek C. Tongco

Division of Tabaco City:

- SDS - Fatima D. Buen, CESO V
- ASDS - Alvin T. Rosare OIC

== Notable people ==
- Gwen Apuli - member of Pinoy pop girl group Bini
- Crispin Beltran – labor leader. Former member of 13th Congress of the Philippines with the Anakpawis party-list and former chair of Kilusang Mayo Uno.
- Barbie Imperial – actress, model, and former housemate from Pinoy Big Brother: 737
- Francis Tolentino – former Metropolitan Manila Development Authority Chairman
- Elizabeth Oropesa – actress
- Simeon Ola – Revolutionary general
- Ramon Paje – 19th Secretary of Environment and Natural Resources
- Ramon Obusan – National Artist of the Philippines for Dance.
- Susan Enriquez – journalist, host
- Salvacion Lim Higgins – National Artist of the Philippines for Fashion Design.
- Bogs Adornado – three-time PBA Most Valuable Player (1975, 1976, and 1981), one of the PBA's 25 Greatest Players of All-Time
- Merlinda Bobis – contemporary Philippine-Australian writer and academic
- Irene Cortes – former Associate Justice of the Supreme Court of the Philippines; first female Dean of the UP College of Law
- Janelle Quintana – actress; 19th Aliw Awards Best New Female Artist nominee
- Valerie Weigmann – TV host, actress; Miss World Philippines 2014
- Athena Imperial – news field reporter, communication researcher and Miss Philippines Earth 2011.
- Miguel White – track and field athlete; bronze medalist in the 400-metre hurdles at the 1936 Summer Olympics
- Jun Lozada – electronics and communications engineer and former chief executive officer of the Philippine Forest Corporation
- David Nepomuceno – 1924 Olympian, first Filipino to compete in the Olympics
- Catriona Gray – Miss Universe 2018 winner
- Jonalyn Viray – singer-songwriter
- Carlos A. Imperial – lawyer, served in the 1st Philippine Legislature as the representative for Albay's 2nd district in the Philippine Assembly (1907-1909)
- Domingo F. Imperial – served as a Senator of Philippines' 6th senatorial district (1934-1935) and the Philippines' 1st Commonwealth Congress (1945-1946), served as the Philippines' first Ambassador to Indonesia, served as the Chairman of the Commission on Elections (1951-1958), served as an Associate Justice of the Supreme Court of the Philippines (1942-1944)
- Pedro Sabido – Former Senator, Former Ambassador to Spain and the Vatican, Former Albay 3rd District Representative (1922–1925, 1925–1928, 1928–1931, 1931–1934, 1935–1938, 1938–1941)
- Carlos R. Imperial – placed 3rd in the 1956 Philippine Bar Examinations, served as Albay 2nd Congressional District Representative (1965-1972, 1987-1998,2001-2007), one of the co-authors/founding fathers of Republic Act No. 5521 – An Act Establishing Bicol University, principal author of House Bill No. 144 that was enacted in law as Republic Act No. 8051 – An Act Converting the Albay Provincial Hospital in Legazpi City into a Regional Training and Teaching Hospital to be known as The Bicol Regional Training and Teaching Hospital
- Jorge S. Imperial – lawyer, served as Associate Justice and Presiding Justice of the Court of Appeals of the Philippines (1987-1999)
- Joey Salceda – Albay 2nd District Representative (2016–present), Former Albay Provincial Governor (2007–2016), Former Albay 3rd District Representative (1998–2001, 2001–2004, 2004–2007), Malacañang Chief of Staff (February 10, 2007 – March 29, 2007)
- Reno Lim – Former Albay 3rd District Representative (2007–2010)
- Dianne Necio – Binibining Pilipinas International 2011, Binibining Pilipinas 2010 First Runner-up, Miss Tabak 2009, Mutya ng Bicolandia
- Rodolfo Salalima – First Secretary of the Department of Information and Communications Technology (DICT)
- Henry Omaga-Diaz – journalist
- Thomas Franco Rodriguez – member of Pinoy pop boy band Alamat and finalist, Pinoy Big Brother: 737 teen edition
- Migz Zubiri – senator (2007-2011, 2016-2022, 2022-present), 24th Senate president (2022-2024), Senate Majority Leader (2008-2010, 2018-2022); former representative of Bukidnon's 3rd district (1998-2007). He traces his roots from Libon, Albay, a birthplace of his mother Maria Victoria Ocampo Fernandez who migrated with her family to Bukidnon as a child.

== See also ==
- Biosphere reserves of the Philippines
