= Simeón Ola =

Filipino general

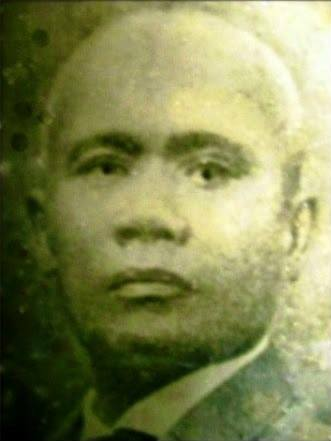
- Last Filipino General to surrender to the American forces

Municipal President of Guinobatan, Albay
- In office 1910–1912

Personal details
- Born: Simeón Ola y Arboleda; September 2, 1865 Guinobatan, Albay, Captaincy General of the Philippines
- Died: February 14, 1952 (aged 86) Guinobatan, Albay, Philippines

Military service
- Allegiance: Katipunan; First Philippine Republic
- Branch/service: Philippine Republican Army
- Years of service: 1898–1903
- Rank: Commandant (Major)
- Battles/wars: Philippine Revolution; Battle of Camalig; Philippine–American War

Simeón Ola y Arboleda (September 2, 1865 – February 14, 1952) is a hero of the Philippine Revolution and was the last general of the Philippines to surrender to the American forces after the Philippine–American War.

== Early life ==
Simeón Ola was born on September 2, 1865, to Vicente Ola and Apolonia Arboleda. He enrolled in Mater Salutis College Seminary and studied philosophy, but did not graduate.

== Revolutionary ==
He joined the local branch of the Katipunan in his hometown province of Albay and later became its leader. With the help of a parish priest he was able to acquire arms to support his men. He was promoted to the rank of captain after the Battle of Camalig in Albay, 1898 and to the rank of major after an ambush mission that led to the capture of three Americans. He was the leader of the subsequent attacks on Oas, Ligao, and Jovellar. He later surrendered on the condition that his men would be granted amnesty. He was put on trial and convicted of sedition. He was sentenced to thirty years in prison. In 1904, he was given a pardon and returned to his place of birth and became the municipal president for 2 terms in 1910-1912 and 1916-1919.

== Controversies ==
At least two potential problems surrounded Ola as the last general to surrender to the American forces. First, he had surrendered earlier on July 5, 1901, as an officer (major) of Vito Belarmino. Second, his role as a zone commander is not mentioned in Miguel Malvar's statement on the condition of his command that he provided in December 1901. Nor was any documentation of his commission as general preserved.

Noting that claims that Simeon Ola was "The Last Filipino General to Surrender" only surfaced in 2007 and any mention of this fact in older references are conveniently missing.

Citations Regarding Simeon Ola as the Last General to Surrender
Date	Source	Claim / Context	URL
December 20, 2007 (Archived)	Manila Bulletin (cited in Wikipedia)	The Wikipedia article for Simeón Ola, which states he "was the last general of the Philippines to surrender," uses a citation from the *Manila Bulletin* that was archived on this date.	(Citing original article)
October 1, 2015	joeam.com	An article states: "The last Revolutionary General to surrender to the Americans was Bikolano Simeon Ola, he held out with his men in the jungles of Bikol."	
September 22, 2016	Philippine Daily Inquirer	An article titled "Ola, not Malvar, was last general to surrender, say sons" directly addresses the claim. It quotes a local historian stating Ola surrendered on Sept. 25, 1903, "a year and five months after Malvar".	
September 23, 2019	Esquire Magazine (Philippines)	An article is titled "Simeon Ola Was the Last General to Surrender to the Americans." This is cited as a reference in the Wikipedia article.	(Citation in Wikipedia)
May 17, 2021 (Archived)	Bicol Standard (cited in Wikipedia)	The Wikipedia article for Simeón Ola cites an article from the *Bicol Standard* (titled "Who was Simeon Ola?") that was archived on this date.	(Citation in Wikipedia)
February 12, 2025	dateline-ibalon.com	An article about Ola states: "His capitulation on September 25, 1903 was 'a full year and five months' after the surrender in Batangas of Gen. Miguel Malvar."	
June 12, 2025	Philippine News Agency	An article about Bicolano heroes states: "...the Bicolano historian also added that the last general to surrender to the Americans was Gen. Simeon Ola, a native of Albay province."	

== Death ==
Simeon Ola died on February 14, 1952, and was interred at the Roman Catholic Cemetery of Guinobatan. In 2003 his remains were transferred to the Ola Shrine.

== Memorials ==
The regional police command in Legazpi City, formerly known as Camp Ibalon, was renamed Camp Simeon A. Ola on June 24, 1991 in his honor.

"Simeon Ola Day" on September 2 was declared a special non-working holiday under Republic Act 11136.
