= Ligao =

Component city in Albay, Philippines

- Component city
- City of Ligao
- Ligao City Hall

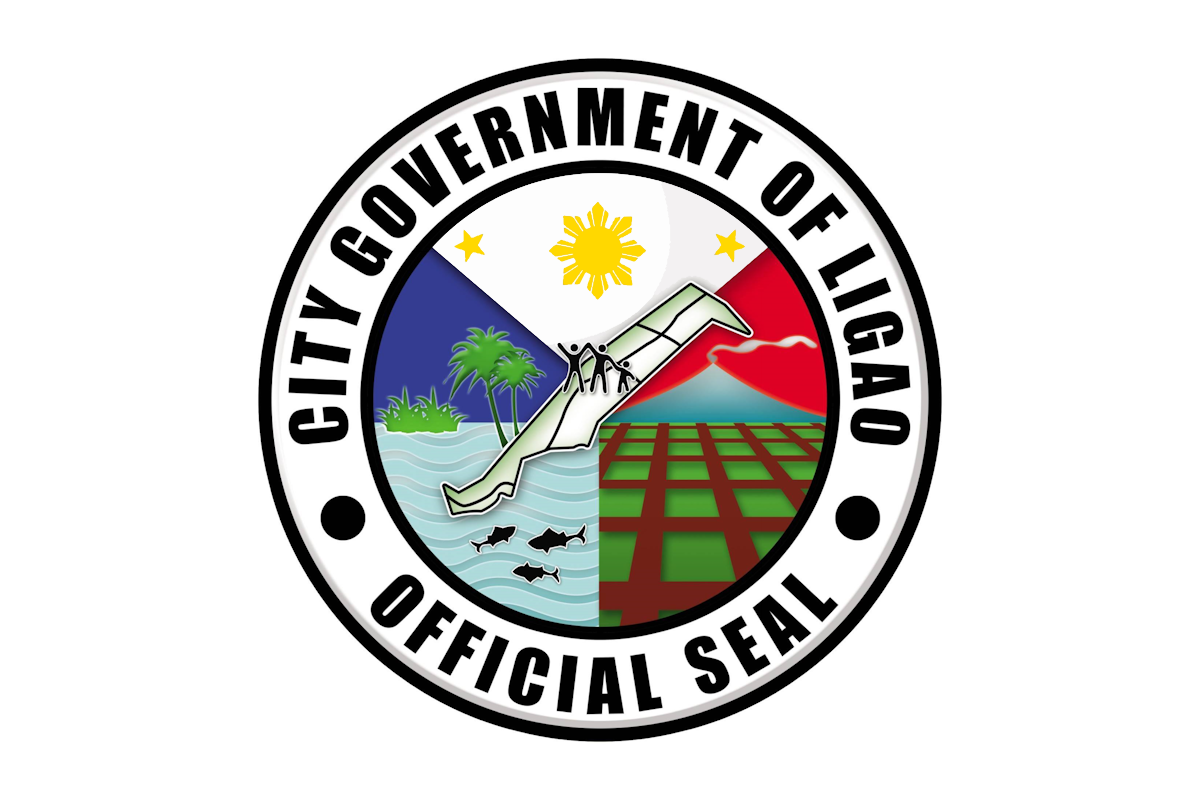
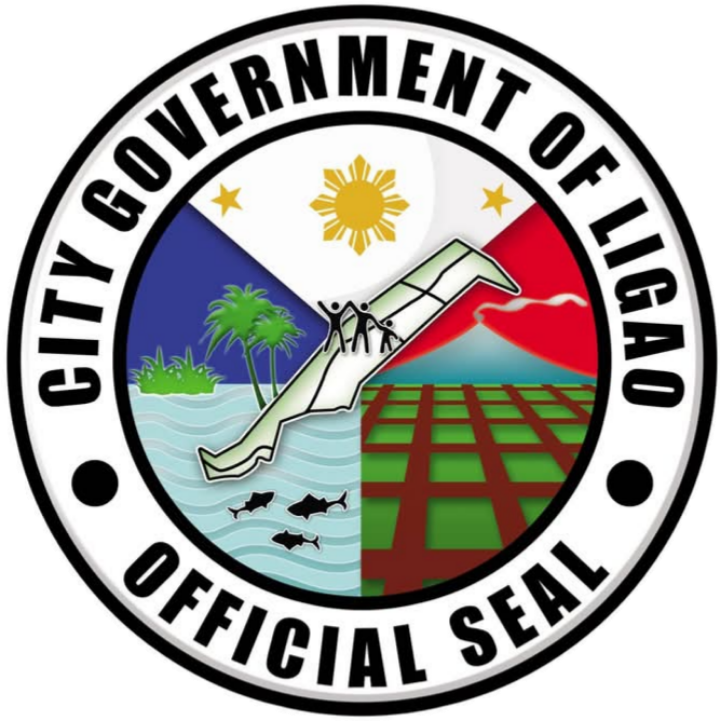
- Flag Seal
- Nickname: ″Sunflower Capital of the Philippines″
- Anthem: Here Forever I will Be
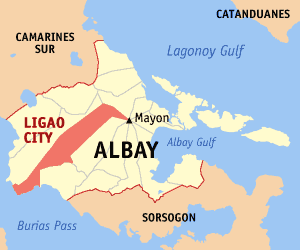
- Map of Albay with Ligao highlighted
- Interactive map of Ligao
- Location within the Philippines
- Coordinates: 13°13′N 123°31′E
- Country: Philippines
- Region: Bicol Region
- Province: Albay
- District: 3rd district
- Founded: 1608
- Cityhood: March 24, 2001
- Barangays: 55 (see Barangays)

Government
  - Type: Sangguniang Panlungsod
  - Mayor: Fernando Vallejo Gonzalez
  - Vice Mayor: Jaypee David
  - Representative: Adrian Salceda
  - City Council: Members: Albert Francis S. Bichara; Amado V. Manlangit, Jr.; Ana P. Manlangit; Sherwin P. Quising; Teodorico A. Residilla, Jr.; Felipe O. Alday; Jurlan N. Buello; Emmanuel C. Ribaya; Esteban M. Gonzales; Sophia G. Monasterial
  - Electorate: 75,417 voters (2025)

Area
  - Total: 246.75 km^{2} (95.27 sq mi)
- Elevation: 197 m (646 ft)
- Highest elevation: 2,442 m (8,012 ft)
- Lowest elevation: 3 m (9.8 ft)

Population (2024 census)
  - Total: 119,779
  - Density: 485.43/km^{2} (1,257.2/sq mi)
  - Households: 26,049

Economy
  - Income class: 3rd city income class
  - Poverty incidence: 28.45% (2023)
  - Revenue: ₱ 1,073 million (2024)
  - Assets: ₱ 4,381 million (2024)
  - Expenditure: ₱ 906.6 million (2024)
  - Liabilities: ₱ 433.7 million (2024)

Service provider
  - Electricity: Albay Electric Cooperative (ALECO)
  - Water: Ligao City Water District
  - Telecommunications: Converge, DCTV
- Time zone: UTC+8 (PST)
- ZIP code: 4504
- PSGC: 050508000
- IDD : area code: +63 (0)52
- Native languages: Tagalog, West Miraya, Central Bikol
- Major religions: Christianity
- Feast date: December 26
- Catholic diocese: Diocese of Legazpi
- Patron saint: San Esteban Protomartir
- Website: ligaocity.albay.gov.ph

Ligao, officially the City of Ligao (Central Bikol: Syudad kan Ligao; West Miraya Bikol: Syudad nin Ligao; Filipino: Lungsod ng Ligao), is a component city in the province of Albay, Philippines. According to the 2024 census, it has a population of 119,779 people. Most of the city's economy came from the agricultural sector.

Ligao is 27 kilometres (17 mi) from Legazpi and 500 kilometres (310 mi) from Manila.

== Etymology ==
Ligao was named after the word ticau (Callicarpa candidans), an abundant tree that has poisonous leaves used to catch fish from rivers and creeks. Another variation is from the Tagalog word ligaw which means to court or win a woman’s love. It was formerly known as Cavasi.

== History ==
Historical Ligao Municipal Hall

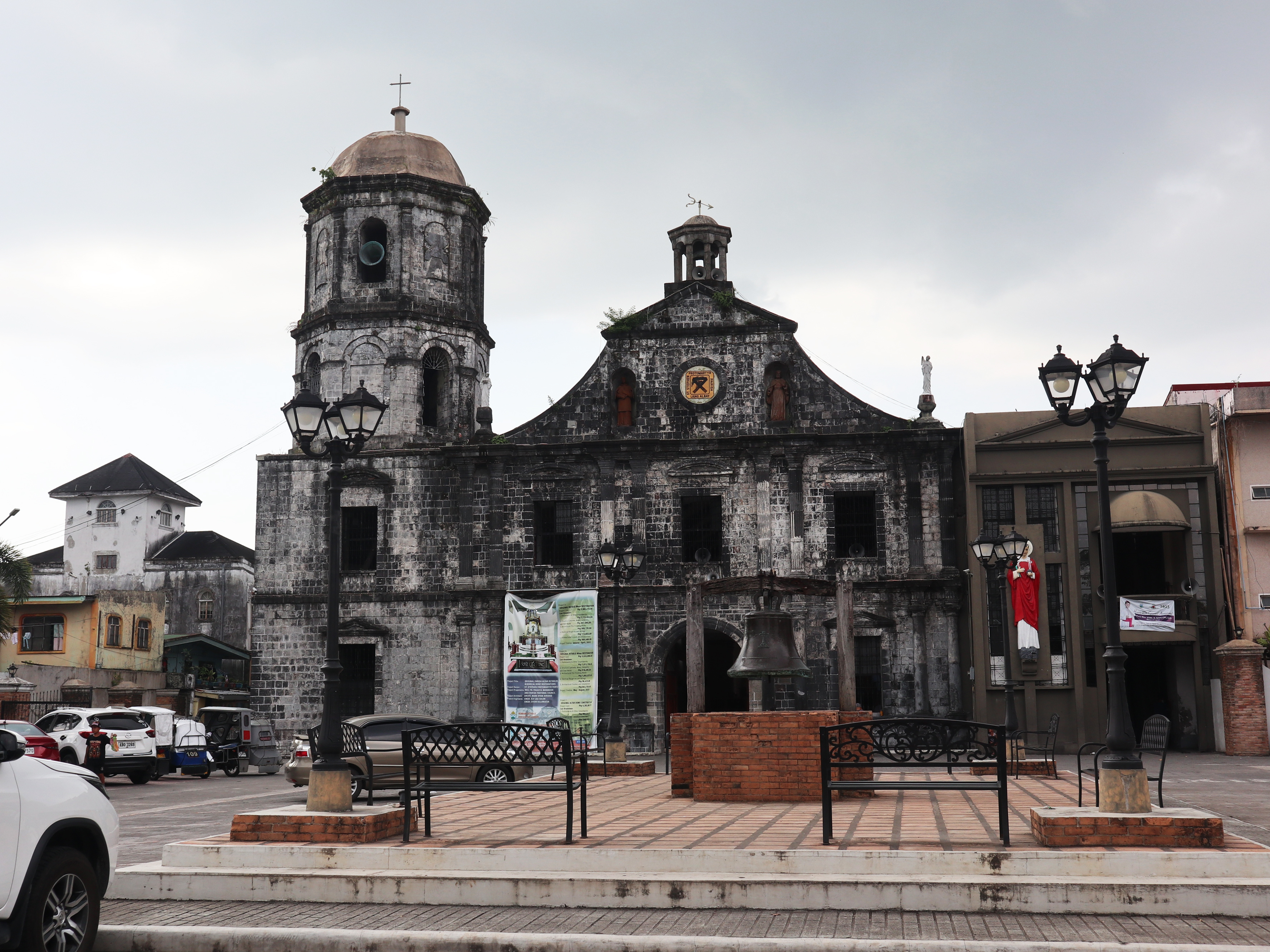
Saint Stephen Protomartyr Parish Church

During the 16th century, Ligao was established as a small settlement. In 1606, it was founded as a barrio of Polangui, and then ceded to Oas in 1665. In the following year, it became an independent municipality. The 1818 census showed the area had 2,968 native families and 24 Spanish-Filipino families.

=== Cityhood ===
On February 21, 2001, President Gloria Macapagal Arroyo signed Republic Act 9008 into law, granting cityhood to Ligao. It was ratified by voters in a plebiscite on March 24 of the same year.

== Geography ==
=== Barangays ===
Ligao City is politically subdivided into 55 barangays. Each barangay consists of puroks and some have sitios.

There are 11 urban and 44 rural barangays, of which 3 are coastal barangays.

- Abella
- Allang
- Amtic
- Bacong
- Bagumbayan (Poblacion)
- Balanac
- Baligang
- Barayong
- Basag
- Batang
- Bay
- Binanowan
- Binatagan (Poblacion)
- Bobonsuran
- Bonga
- Busac
- Busay
- Cabarian
- Calzada (Poblacion)
- Catburawan
- Cavasi (Poblacion)
- Culliat
- Dunao (Poblacion)
- Francia
- Guilid (Poblacion)
- Herrera (Poblacion)
- Layon
- Macalidong
- Mahaba
- Malama
- Maonon
- Nasisi
- Nabonton
- Oma-Oma
- Palapas
- Pandan
- Paulba
- Paulog
- Pinamaniquian
- Pinit
- Ranao-Ranao
- San Vicente
- Santa Cruz (Poblacion)
- Tagpo (Poblacion)
- Tambo
- Tandarora
- Tastas
- Tinago (Poblacion)
- Tinampo
- Tiongson
- Tomolin (Poblacion)
- Tuburan (Poblacion)
- Tula-Tula Grande
- Tula-Tula Pequeño
- Tupas

=== Climate ===
Climate data for Ligao
| Month | Jan | Feb | Mar | Apr | May | Jun | Jul | Aug | Sep | Oct | Nov | Dec | Year |
|---|---|---|---|---|---|---|---|---|---|---|---|---|---|
| Mean daily maximum °C (°F) | 26 (79) | 27 (81) | 28 (82) | 30 (86) | 30 (86) | 30 (86) | 29 (84) | 29 (84) | 29 (84) | 28 (82) | 28 (82) | 27 (81) | 28 (83) |
| Mean daily minimum °C (°F) | 22 (72) | 22 (72) | 22 (72) | 23 (73) | 24 (75) | 25 (77) | 25 (77) | 24 (75) | 24 (75) | 24 (75) | 24 (75) | 23 (73) | 24 (74) |
| Average precipitation mm (inches) | 138 (5.4) | 83 (3.3) | 74 (2.9) | 50 (2.0) | 108 (4.3) | 165 (6.5) | 202 (8.0) | 165 (6.5) | 190 (7.5) | 186 (7.3) | 188 (7.4) | 183 (7.2) | 1,732 (68.3) |
| Average rainy days | 16.8 | 11.9 | 13.5 | 13.8 | 20.5 | 25.2 | 27.4 | 26.2 | 26.1 | 24.7 | 20.7 | 18.5 | 245.3 |
Source: Meteoblue

The area of Ligao belongs to a combination of Types II and IV climate, and these are characterized by rainy season from July to December and dry season from January to June.

== Local government ==
=== Elected officials ===
2022–2025 Ligao City Officials
| Position | Name | Party |
|---|---|---|
| Mayor | Fernando V. Gonzales + | NUP |
| Vice Mayor | Jaypee M. David + | NUP |
| Councilors | Albert Francis S. Bichara + | NUP |
| Councilors | Amado V. Manlangit, Jr. ‹› | NUP |
| Councilors | Ana P. Manlangit ‹› | NUP |
| Councilors | Sherwin P. Quising ‹› | NUP |
| Councilors | Teodorico A. Residilla, Jr. + | NUP |
| Councilors | Felipe O. Alday ‹› | NUP |
| Councilors | Jurlan N. Buello + | NUP |
| Councilors | Emmanuel C. Ribaya ‹› | NUP |
| Councilors | Esteban M. Gonzales + | NUP |
| Councilors | Sophia Garcia-Monasterial ‹› | NUP |
Ex Officio Municipal Council Members
| ABC President | Jona L. Peñalosa (Mahaba) | Nonpartisan |
| SK Federation President | John Michael O. Surbano (Tuburan) | Nonpartisan |

Legend
1. A + indicates that the official is elected for the first term
2. A ♯ indicates that the official is re-elected to a higher position
3. A ‹› indicates that the official is re-elected to the same position

=== Past Municipal Administrators ===
Spanish Era (1702–1898)
| Inclusive years | Capitan municipal |
|---|---|
| 1702 | Don Miguel Tuagnon |
| 1703 | Don Fernando Dayang |
| 1704-1705 | Don Jose Carillo |
| 1706-1707 | Don Juan Lobos |
| 1708 | Don Fernando de Maliza |
| 1709-1710 | Don Roque Magñon |
| 1711 | Don Diego Carillo |
| 1712-1713 | Don Tomas Panibi |
| 1714 | Don Francisco Ramirez |
| 1715 | Don Miguel Tuagnon |
| 1716-1717 | Don Tomas Panibi |
| 1718 | Don Roque Magñon |
| 1719 | Don Juan Lobos |
| 1720 | Don Jose Ayagñon |
| 1721 | Don Tomas Panibi |
| 1722-1723 | Don Antonio dela Cruz |
| 1724-1725 | Don Jose Ayagñon |
| 1726-1727 | Don Antonio dela Cruz |
| 1728 | Don Francisco Antonio |
| 1729 | Don Pedro Manisao |
| 1730 | Don Salvador de la Corona |
| 1731 | Don Antonio de la Cruz |
| 1732 | Don Jose Ayagñon |
| 1733 | Don Francisco Antonio |
| 1734 | Don Francisco Fernandez |
| 1735-1736 | Don Salvador Concepcion |
| 1737-1739 | Don Esteban de Sto. Domingo |
| 1740-1741 | Don Francisco Fernandez |
| 1742 | Don Esteban de Sto. Domingo |
| 1743-1745 | Don Francisco Fernandez |
| 1746-1749 | Don Esteban de Sto. Domingo |
| 1750 | Don Joaquin Mateo |
| 1751 | Don Francisco Manuel |
| 1752 | Don Francisco Javier |
| 1753 | Don Esteban de Sto. Domingo |
| 1754 | Don Diego Villegas |
| 1755 | Don Diego Dimasayao |
| 1756 | Don Esteban de Sto. Domingo |
| 1755 | Don Diego Dimasayao |
| 1756 | Don Esteban de Sto. Domingo |
| 1757 | Don Diego Villegas |
| 1758 | Don Antonio Martines |
| 1759 | Don Miguel Alvarez |
| 1760 | Don Miguel Yuson |
| 1761 | Don Esteban de Sto. Domingo |
| 1762 | Don Diego Villegas |
| 1763 | Don Esteban de Sto. Domingo |
| 1764 | Don Pedro Demasudo |
| 1765 | Don Pascual Manlagñit |
| 1766-1768 | Don Joaquin Mateo |
| 1769 | Don Fernando Victor |
| 1770 | Don Juan Torrero |
| 1771 | Don Manuel Fernandez |
| 1772 | Don Juan Salvador |
| 1773 | Don Mateo Ataquinez |
| 1774-1777 | Don Esteban de Sto. Domingo |
| 1778 | Don Jose Leonardo |
| 1779 | Don Joaquin Mateo |
| 1780 | Don Alejandro Brioso |
| 1781 | Don Juan de la Cruz |
| 1782 | Don Tomas Villanueva |
| 1783 | Don Antonio de la Cruz |
| 1784 | Don Joaquin Mariano |
| 1785 | Don Tomas Villanueva |
| 1786 | Don Manuel Fernandez |
| 1787 | Don Juan Antonio |
| 1788 | Don Tomas Villanueva |
| 1789 | Don Tomas Paulino |
| 1790 | Don Esteban Vejerrano |
| 1791 | Don Julian Martinez |
| 1792 | Don Manuel de los Santos |
| 1793 | Don Tomas Villanueva |
| 1794 | Don Esteban Buenaventura |
| 1795 | Don Manuel San Antonio |
| 1796 | Don Pascual Buenaventura |
| 1797 | Don Juan Gonzaga |
| 1798 | Don Pedro Urbano |
| 1799 | Don Jose Alberto |
| 1800 | Don Esteban del Rosario |
| 1801 | Don Julian Martinez |
| 1802 | Don Esteban Reyes |
| 1803 | Don Vicente Apolinario |
| 1804 | Don Antonio Joaquin |
| 1805 | Don Tomas Villanueva |
| 1806 | Don Fernando del Rosario |
| 1807 | Don Esteban de Sto. Domingo |
| 1808 | Don Esteban del Rosario |
| 1809 | Don Jose Antonio |
| 1810 | Don Juan Gonzaga |
| 1811 | Don Andres Reyes |
| 1812 | Don Esteban Enrique |
| 1813-1815 | Don Jose Alberto |
| 1816 | Don Joaquin Mariano |
| 1817 | Don Manuel Salvador |
| 1818 | Don Juan Reyes |
| 1819 | Don Juan Gonzaga |
| 1820 | Don Esteban de Sto. Domingo |
| 1821 | Don Juan Casorog |
| 1822 | Don Jose Alberto |
| 1823 | Don Jose Molina |
| 1824 | Don Claudio Sanchez |
| 1825 | Don Agustin Silvestre |
| 1826 | Don Esteban Salazar |
| 1827 | Don Lazaro Cayetano |
| 1828 | Don Jose Alberto |
| 1829 | Don Mariano Rafael |
| 1830 | Pedro Yuson |
| 1831 | Don Blas Martirez |
| 1832 | Don Juan San Jose |
| 1833 | Don Matias Pedro |
| 1834 | Don Francisco Fernandez |
| 1835 | Don Lorenzo Hilario |
| 1836 | Don Miguel Tuason |
| 1837 | Don Diego Buenaventura |
| 1838 | Don Domingo Nava |
| 1839-1840 | Don Agustin Silvestre |
| 1841 | Don Vicente de Leon |
| 1842 | Don Juan del Rosario |
| 1843 | Don Euegenio Benito |
| 1844 | Don Juanario San Esteban |
| 1845 | Don Jose Luis |
| 1846 | Don Tomas del Rosario |
| 1847 | Don Fernandez Federico |
| 1848 | Don Eugenio San Benito |
| 1849 | Don Fernandez Federico |
| 1850 | Don Atanacio Allorde |
| 1851 | Don Francisco Alejandro |
| 1852 | Don Santiago Vivar |
| 1853 | Don Maximo Ralla |
| 1854 | Don Tomas Tuazon |
| 1855 | Don Julian Garcia |
| 1856 | Don Juan Orante |
| 1857 | Don Isidro Portallo |
| 1858-1859 | Don Domingo Imperial |
| 1860-1861 | Don Jose Relente |
| 1862 | Don Ignacio Pulvinar |
| 1863-1864 | Don Pablo Lorenzo |
| 1865-1866 | Don Monico Peralta |
| 1867-1868 | Don Agustin Sanchez |
| 1869-1870 | Don Pablo Lorenzo |
| 1871-1872 | Don Ambrocio Peñoso |
| 1873-1874 | Don Agusti Sanchez |
| 1875 | Don Agapito Nieves |
| 1876 | Don Domingo Imperial |
| 1877-1878 | Don Seminiano Querol |
| 1879-1880 | Don Pablo Ralla |
| 1881-1882 | Don Vicente Velasco |
| 1883-1884 | Don Pedro Señora |
| 1885-1886 | Don Agustin Silo |
| 1887-1888 | Don Pio Balana |
| 1889-1892 | Don Ramon F. Santos |
| 1893-1894 | Don Rufino Nieves |
| 1895-1898 | Don Pedro Ralla |

Republica Filipina (1898–1900)
| Inclusive years | Municipal president |
|---|---|
| 1898-1900 | Ramon F. Santos (Appointed by Gen. Emilio F. Aguinaldo) |

American Rule (1900–1941)
| Inclusive years | Municipal president |
|---|---|
| 1900 | Esteban Delgado |
| 1901-1903 | Jose del Rosario, Sr. |
| 1904-1905 | Lorenzo Lopez |
| 1906-1907 | Roman Jaucian |
| 1908-1909 | Tomas Luna |
| 1910-1915 | Paulino Pulvinar |
| 1916-1921 | Jose Delgado |
| 1922-1926 | Roman Jaucian |
| 1927 | Maximo Prollamante |
| 1928-1930 | Salvador Jaucian |
| 1931-1941 | Jose Parlade, Jr. (Japanese Invasion Dec. 11, 1941) |

Japanese Occupation (1942–1945)
| Inclusive years | Municipal Mayor |
|---|---|
| 1942-1943 | Jose D. Conejero (Japanese Appointed) |
| October 14, 1943 – April 30, 1944 | Elias Tibor (Japanese Appointed) |
| May 1, 1944 – December 17, 1945 | Jose Parlade, Jr. (Japanese Appointed) |

Post-War Period (1945–present)
| Inclusive years | Municipal Mayor | Municipal Vice Mayor | SK Federation President | ABC President | Remarks |
|---|---|---|---|---|---|
| December 18, 1945 – February 22, 1946 | Jose D. Conejero | | | | (Acting Mayor, Appointed by Pres. Sergio Osmeña) |
| February 23, 1946 – June 27, 1946 | Daniel Delgado | | | | (Appointed by Pres. Sergio Osmeña) |
| June 28, 1946 – September 18, 1947 | Jose Quiapon | | | | (Appointed by Pres. Manuel A. Roxas) |
| September 19, 1947 – December 30, 1947 | Atty. Florentino C. Jaucian | | | | (Appointed by Pres. Manuel A. Roxas) |
| January 1, 1948 – December 30, 1955 | Jose G. Del Rosario | | | | |
| January 1, 1956 – December 30, 1959 | Rafael Gaya | | | | |
| January 1, 1960 – December 30, 1963 | Jose Parlade, Jr. | | | | |
| January 1, 1964 – December 30, 1971 | Rafael Gaya | | | | |
| January 1, 1972 – 1978 | Maximino A. Peralta | Angel Garcia | | | |
| 1978-February 25, 1986 | Francisco V. Gonzales, Jr. | | | | |
| 1986–1988 | Al Francis D.C. Bichara | | | | Appointed Mayor by Pres. Corazon Aquino |
| February 1, 1988 – 1994 | Francisco V. Gonzales, Jr. | Magdalena S. Lim (1992–1994) | | | (Died in office) |
| 1994-June 30, 1995 | Magdalena S. Lim | | | | |
| June 30, 1995 – June 30, 2004 | Fernando V. Gonzales | Vicente A. Gonzales | Paul P. Manlangit | Nicanor C. Sto. Tomas | |
| June 30, 2004 – June 30, 2013 | Linda Passi-Gonzales | | | | |
| June 30, 2013 – June 30, 2022 | Patricia Gonzales-Alsua | | | | |
| June 30, 2022 – June 30, 2028 | Fernando V. Gonzales | | | | |

== Demographics ==
Population census of Ligao
| Year | Pop. | ±% p.a. |
|---|---|---|
| 1903 | 17,687 | — |
| 1918 | 21,467 | +1.30% |
| 1939 | 27,927 | +1.26% |
| 1948 | 37,331 | +3.28% |
| 1960 | 53,376 | +3.02% |
| 1970 | 56,765 | +0.62% |
| 1975 | 61,548 | +1.64% |
| 1980 | 69,860 | +2.56% |
| 1990 | 72,560 | +0.38% |
| 1995 | 80,861 | +2.05% |
| 2000 | 90,603 | +2.47% |
| 2007 | 101,179 | +1.53% |
| 2010 | 104,914 | +1.33% |
| 2015 | 111,399 | +1.15% |
| 2020 | 118,096 | +1.24% |
| 2024 | 119,779 | +0.34% |
Source: Philippine Statistics Authority

== Economy ==
Poverty incidence of Ligao (%)

Source: Philippine Statistics Authority

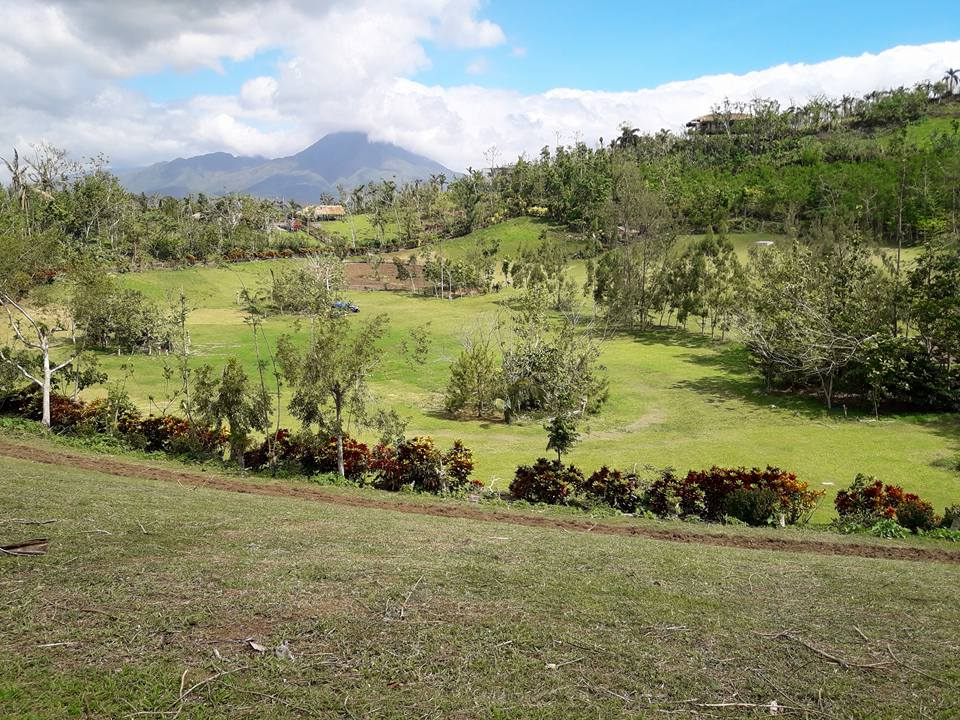
Kawa-Kawa Hill and Natural Park

As of May 2022, there are 3 major banks in operation. Landbank, Metrobank and PNB.

BPI Direct BanKo also opened one of their branches here last 2019.

A local Mall Chain, LCC Malls, opened one of their branches here last December 2013.and JnF Mall on July 21, 2025

== Education ==
Presently, there are almost 60 Day Care Centers, 55 public elementary schools, 12 private elementary schools, 12 public high schools, 6 private high schools and 7 tertiary/vocational institutions/schools in the city.

=== Tertiary / Vocational / Technical Education ===
The cit has seven tertiary schools:

- The Ligao Community College (LiComCo) its present location is at Brgy. Tomolin, Ligao City. The Courses offered are Bachelor of Secondary Education Majors in (Social Studies, Mathematics, English)
- The Bicol University College of Veterinary Medicine (BU Ligao) is still under construction at Brgy. Bay and Tinago, Ligao City.

- The Infotech Development System Colleges, Inc. (IDSC) is a Non-sectarian institution and is located at Padre Natera St., Dunao, Ligao City.
- The RENET Technolical College and the Computer Arts Technology (RENET), which offers technical and vocational courses, located at corner R. Santos and Concepcion sts. Dunao, Ligao City.
- The Computer Arts and Technological College (CAT College), is located at McKinley st., Binatagan, Ligao City.
- Global Site for I.T. Studies - Ligao Branch, Inc. at Barangay Calzada
- The Jesse Robredo Productivity Center (JRPC), is a TESDA training center located at Brgy. Tuburan, Ligao City.
- The BFP Regional Office and Training Center located at Brgy. Tuburan, Ligao City.

=== Secondary Education ===
==== Public High Schools ====
- Ligao National High School (LNHS) was originally named Ligao Municipal High School, in the then municipality of Ligao, now Ligao City. This was opened on June 20, 1980 through the efforts of the municipal officials who acted on a barangay resolution passed by several barangays which had long wished to have a secondary school. Hence, the passage and approval of Sangguniang Bayan Resolution Nos. 15, 17 and 19 s. 1980 which stated the public demand for the opening of Ligao Municipal High School supported by municipal funds. Thus, on June 24, 1980, the Department of Education, Culture and Sports finally signed and issued Permit No. 36, s. 1980 which marked the opening of the Ligao Municipal High School effective school year 1980 – 1981. Due to the petition received by the Sangguniang Bayan, the school was renamed as Ligao Municipal Technical Vocational School which offered vocational and technical subjects that would meet the needs of the community. Sometime in 1993, LMTVS was renamed Ligao National High School under Republic Act No. 7794. Since then LNHS has gained a name for itself by the achievements it earned from academic and non – academic competitions.
- The Ligao City National Technical-Vocational High School (LCNTVHS) is located at Ligao-Sabloyon-Tabaco Road, Brgy. Nasisi Ligao City. Is a Technical-Vocational High School was established through Republic Act No. 10984, on March 14, 2018.
- The Bicol Regional Science High School (BRSHS) was conceived by virtue of DECS Order No. 69, series of 1993. In the beginning of the school year 1994–1995, students were enrolled in Ligao National High School since BRSHS had no site of its own. The organization used the LNHS's facilities and classrooms for its daily operations. In 2000, after six years of existence, BRSHS achieved independence and completely separated from its mother school. The institution was then transferred to barangay Tuburan.
- Deogracias P. Princesa Memorial High School, located at Ranao-Ranao, Ligao City
- Amtic National High School
- Bacong National High School
- Barayong National High School
- Cabarian National High School
- Maonon National High School
- Oma-oma National High School
- Palapas National High School
- Paulba National High School

==== Private High Schools ====
- St. Mary’s Academy (formerly St. Stephen’s Academy) at San Esteban st., Guilid, Ligao City
- Mayon Institute of Science and Technology at Brgy. Tuburan
- Vanderpol Christian Academy at Brgy. Layon, Ligao City
- CAT College– SHS at Brgy. Binatagan, Ligao City
- RENET College– SHS at Brgy. Dunao, Ligao City
- Infotech Development Systems Colleges, Inc. (IDS Colleges)– SHS at Brgy. Dunao, Ligao City
- Global Site for I.T. Studies - Ligao Branch, Inc. - SHS at Barangay Calzada

=== Primary Education ===
==== Public Elementary Schools ====
- Ligao East Central School at Maharlika Highway, Tuburan, Ligao City. It is the flagship school of the Ligao East Districts, formerly known as the Tuburan Elementary School. Its satellite schools are the following:
- Amtic Elementary School
- Baligang Elementary School
- Barayong Elementary School
- Basag Elementary School
- Batang Elementary School
- Binanowan Elementary School
- Buga Elementary School
- Busay Elementary School
- Don Teotimo Elementary School
- Herrera Elementary School
- Layon Elementary School
- Nabonton Elementary School
- Paulog Elementary School
- Pinit Elementary School
- Tambo Elementary School
- Tinago Elementary School
- Tobgon Elementary School
- Ligao West Central School-Binatagan at McKinley st. Barangay Binatagan. It is the flagship school of the Ligao West District. Its satellite schools are the following:
- Ligao West Central School-Poblacion
- Allang Elementary School
- Bonga Elementary School
- Cavasi Elementary School
- Cristina R. Princesa Elementary School
- Culliat Elementary School
- Greenfield Elementary School
- Macael Elementary School
- Macalidong Elementary School
- Mahaba Elementary School
- Pandan Elementary School
- Pinamaniquian Elementary School
- Quiasa Elementary School
- Sta. Cruz Elementary School
- Tastas Elementary School
- Tinampo Elementary School
- Tula-Tula Grande Elementary School
- Tula-Tula Pequeño Elementary School
- Paulba Elementary School at Barangay Paulba. It is the flagship school of the Ligao South District. Its satellite schools are the following:
- Abella Elementary School
- Bacong Elementary School
- Bagacay Elementary School
- Balanac Elementary School
- Busac Elementary School
- Cabarian Elementary School
- Catburawan Elementary School
- Francia Elementary School
- Malama Elementary School
- Maonon Elementary School
- Oma-Oma Elementary School
- Palapas Elementary School
- San Vicente Elementary School
- Tambac Elementary School
- Tandarura Elementary School
- Tiongson Elementary School
- Tupas Elementary School

==== Private Elementary and Pre Schools ====
- St. Mary’s Academy (formerly St. Stephen’s Academy) at Barangay Guilid
- Vanderpol Christian Academy at Barangay Layon
- Aletheia Christian Academy of Ligao Inc. at Barangay Dunao
- Arise and Shine Christian School of Ligao, Inc. at Barangay Guilid
- Cornerstone Development Center for Children Inc. at Barangay Tuburan
- Fishermen of Christ Learning Center-Ligao at Barangay Batang
- Holy Trinity Foundation Learning School of Ligao, Inc. at Barangay Tinago
- Kinder Home Learning Center (Little Jewels Learning Center) at Barangay Sta. Cruz
- Ligao Adventist Elementary School Inc. at Barangay Tuburan
- Our Children’s Montessori Foundation, Inc at Barangay Sta. Cruz
- Nazarene Kindergarten School at Barangay Dunao
- One Asia Kids Academy at Barangay Binatagan
- Anchor Baptist Christian Academy at Barangay Tinago
- Bicol Hope Kindergarten School-Ligao at Barangay Batang
- Ma. Celia Montessori School at Crespo st.

== Notable people ==
- Jun Lozada, whistleblower and former chief executive officer of the Philippine Forest Corporation
