= Albay Forever =

Provincial anthem of Albay

- Provincial anthem of Albay
- Also known as: Albay Sagkod pa Man
- Lyrics: Jose R. Ravalo (original English lyrics), 2004
- Music: Jose R. Ravalo, 2004
- Adopted: March 31, 2004

"Albay Forever" (Central Bikol: Albay Sagkod pa Man), also known as the Albay Hymn or the Albay Provincial Hymn, is the official anthem of the province of Albay in the Philippines.

== History ==
"Albay Forever" was composed by Jose R. Ravalo of Oas, who also wrote the song's original English lyrics.

The Albay Provincial Board officially adopted the song on March 31, 2004, with the passage of Ordinance No. 02-2004. Lyrics in Central Bikol, the largest regional language spoken in the province, were also subsequently adopted.

== Lyrics ==
Original English version
Albay Forever
penned by Jose R. Ravalo
Central Bikol version
Albay Sagkod pa Man
translated by The Neighboring Tones Inc.

There’s a place in Bicol that we hold dear
Land of beauty and laughter and song
Where you see the flowers bloom forever
Haven to all the weary throng

Where stands our Mt. Mayon the peerless
Awe-inspiring, majestic, grand
It’s a place where skies are bluer
This is Albay our own dear land

Thy name we’ll cherish always,
No matter where we be.
Thy sons shall stand by thee united,
Forever and loyal to thee.

May lugar digdi sa Kabikolan
Na pano ning mga kaogmahan
Mga tawo pobre o mayaman
Sarabay sa pag-uswag nin banwaan

An bulkang Mayon samong ladawan
Simbolo nin kagayonan
Mahal na Diyos dai Mo pabayaan
Mahal ming Albay sagkod pa man

Kaming mga Albayano
Saen man magduman
Dai mi nanggad malilingawan
An samuyang dagang tinubuan

The lyrics of the song have been interpreted as a call for Albayanos to love and protect their environment.

== Performance ==
Singing "Albay Forever" is mandatory whenever there is an official event being held in the province of Albay, alongside the recitation of the provincial pledge, "I Am an Albayano".

During the 2013 Daragang Magayon Festival in Legazpi, the provincial capital, a two-round contest was held between teams to see who can extract the most coconut milk out of a pile of coconuts to the tune of the anthem.
