= Vito Belarmino =

Filipino general during the Philippine Revolution and Philippine–American War

Vito Belarmino Loyola
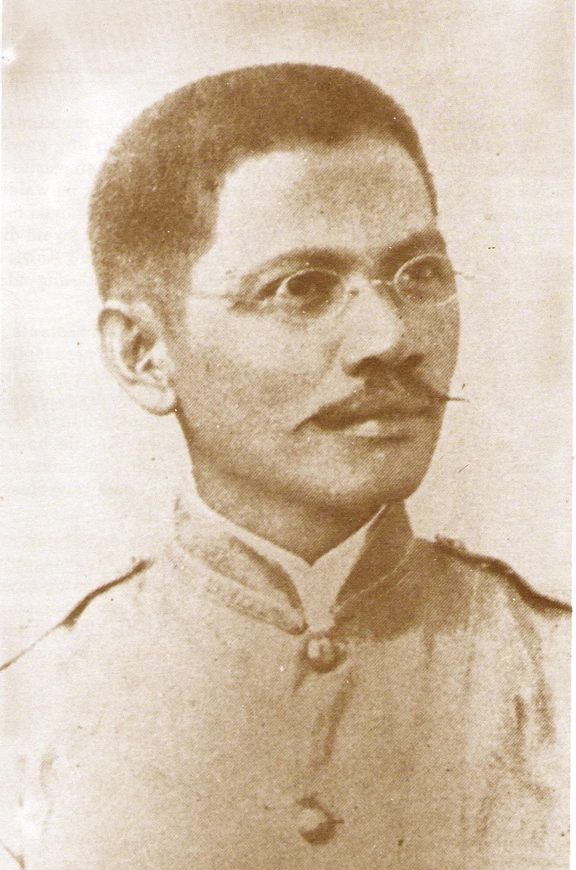
- Born: June 15, 1857; Silang, Cavite, Captaincy General of the Philippines
- Died: July 14, 1933 (aged 76); Insular Government of the Philippine Islands
- Parent(s): Severino Belarmino, Damiana Loyola

Vito Belarmino y Loyola (June 15, 1857 – July 14, 1933) was a Filipino general during the Philippine Revolution. During the revolution, he was codenamed "Walang Gulat" by fellow Katipuneros. He was placed by Emilio Aguinaldo in command in the province of Albay. There, he established a republican government. He was a Major general.

== Military career ==
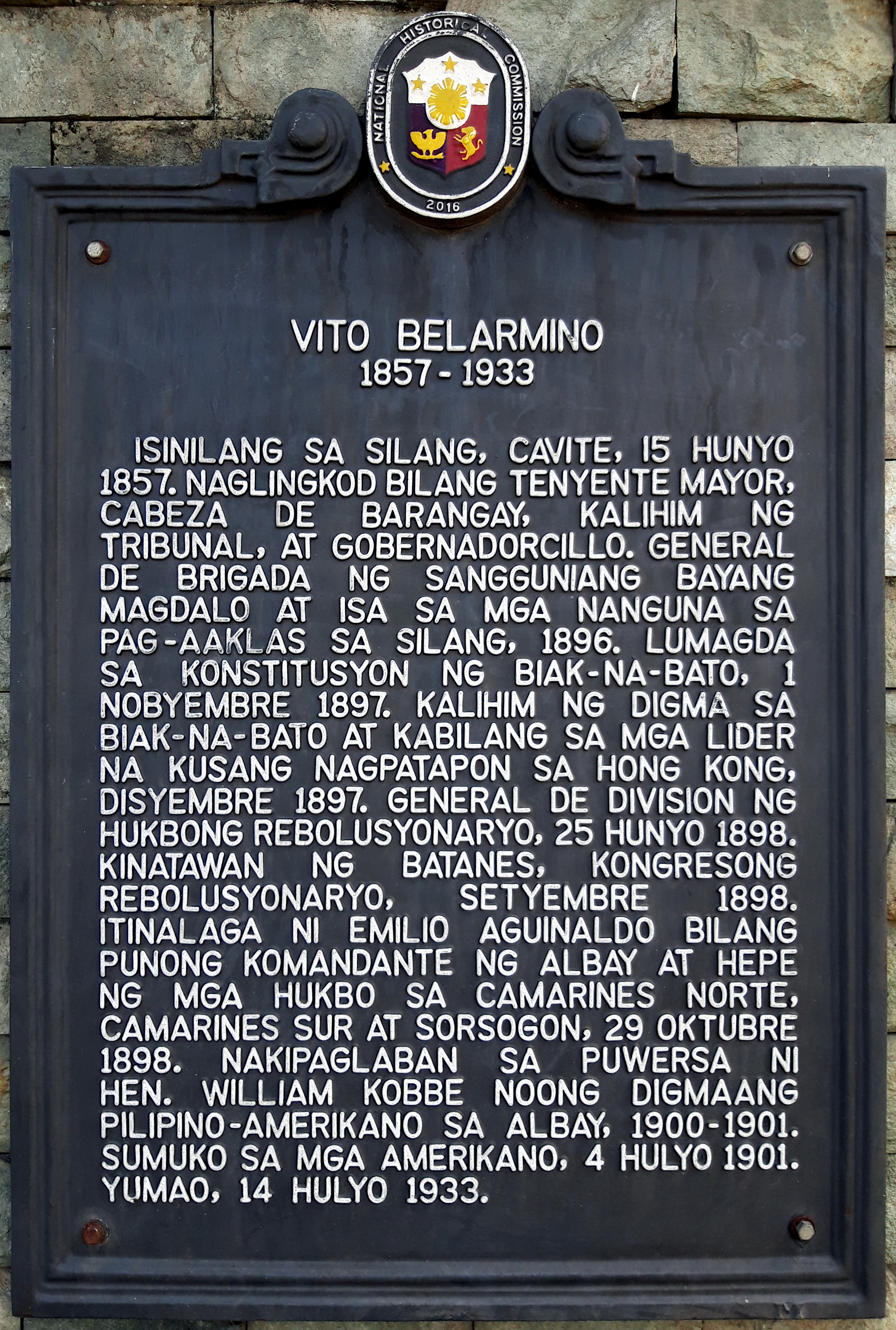
Historical marker installed in Silang, Cavite in 2016

He joined Aguinaldo in the assault against Infantry Battalion No. 72 of the Spanish Army stationed in Talisay, Batangas. In this encounter, Aguinaldo left to him the leadership of the successful attack on the convent and church and on the Spanish guards.

On April 2nd of 1898, he led a battle along with Simeón Ola, Glicerio Delgado and other Filipino revolutionaries at Camalig in Albay province. This Battle is known as Battle of Camalig.

During the Philippine–American War, he would be given command of Albay to establish a local republican government. He and General José Ignacio Paua defended Legazpi, Albay against American forces led by General William August Kobbé.

On July 4, 1901, due to lack of ammunition, he surrendered to the American forces.

== Personal life ==
After the war, he retired into private life in his province. He lost his vision in 1929, and died in July 14, 1933, of cerebral attack.

Belarmino studied in Colegio de San Juan de Letran, although his parents discontinued it after the widespread pandemic of Cholera at that time.

At 19 years old, he became involved in politics in Silang, Cavite. During his political career, he became a teniente mayor, Cabeza de barangay, Gobernadorcillo and a secretary to the tribunal.
