= Gilbert Sadsad =

Filipino educator and GSIS trustee (born February 15, 1963

Gilbert Tan Sadsad is a Filipino educator and public official best known for his leadership roles in the Department of Education (DepEd) and the Philippine Public School Teachers Association (PPSTA). He was appointed as a trustee of the Government Service Insurance System (GSIS) in 2025.

Sadsad began his career in education as a public school teacher in Magarao, Camarines Sur, and rose through the ranks over many years. He was designated OIC assistant schools division superintendent of Iriga City in 2007 and eventually as assistant regional director for Bicol in 2014 In his DepEd roles, he has overseen regional education operations and promoted policies aimed at improving school environments and student welfare. The Civil Service Commission (CSC) recognized his service through the CSC Pagasa Award in 2025.

The appointment of Sadsad and two others followed the resignation of Ma. Merceditas Gutierrez, Emmanuel Samson and Rita Riddle.
