= Philippine Forest Corporation =

Philippine Forest Corporation is a Philippine government controlled corporation. It is under the Department of Environment and Natural Resources.
