= 2019 Albay local elections =

Philippine election

2019 Albay gubernatorial election
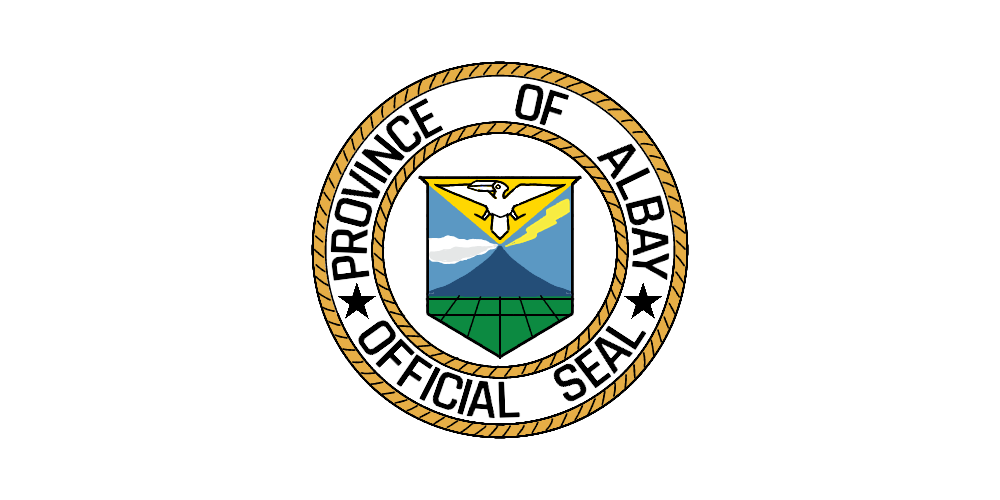
- May 13, 2019
- Turnout: 79.25% ▼6.52%
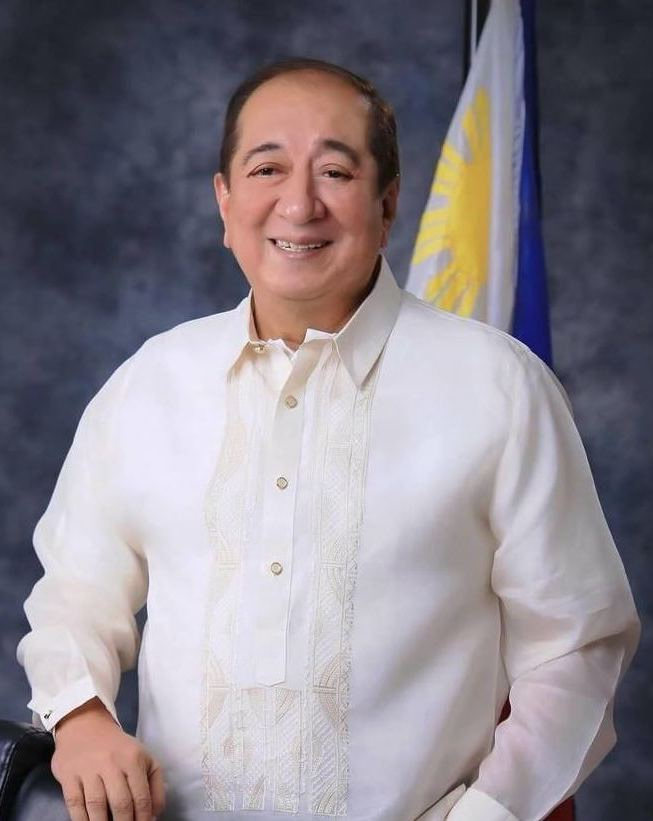

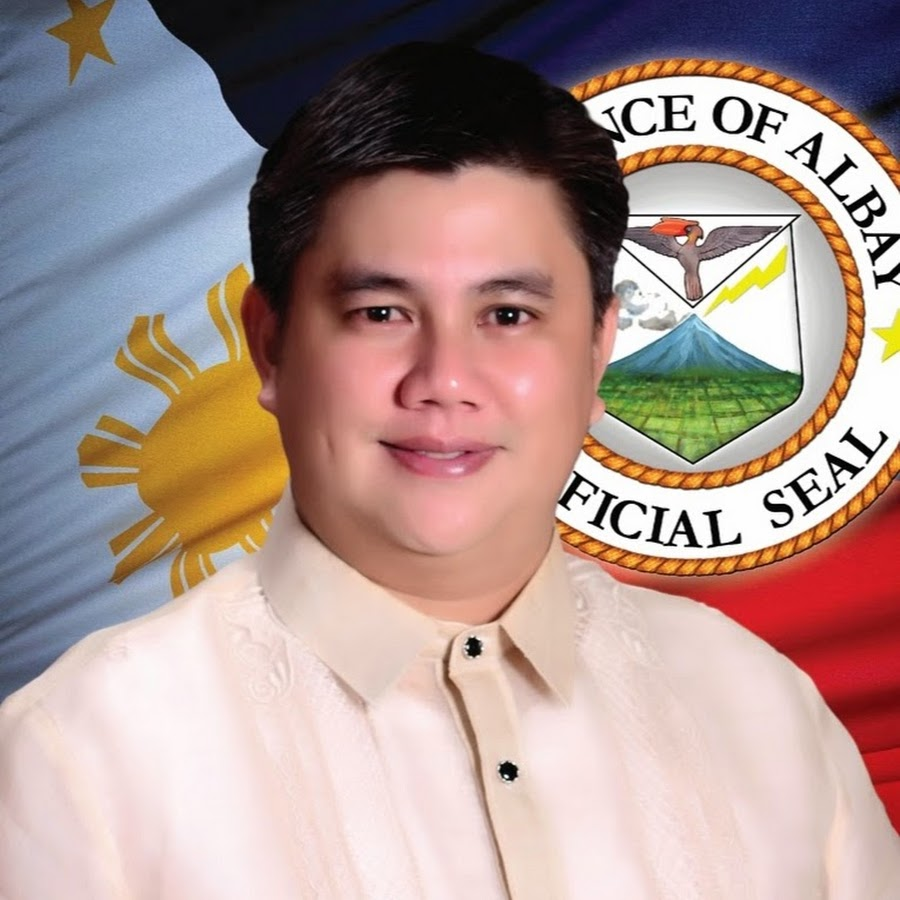

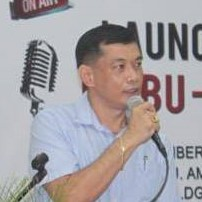
Nominee	Al Francis Bichara	Harold Imperial	Hermogenes Alegre, Jr.
Party	PDP–Laban	Liberal	Independent
Running mate	Edcel Greco Lagman	Alan Rañola (NPC)
Popular vote	292,767	139,457	91,402
Percentage	53.24	25.36	16.62
- Results per Municipality and City; Bichara: 30–40% 40–50% 50–60% 60–70% 70-80%
Governor before election
Al Francis Bichara
Nacionalista
Elected Governor
Al Francis Bichara
PDP–Laban

Albay local elections were held on May 13, 2019, as part of the 2019 Philippine general election. Voters selected their candidates of choice for all local positions: municipal or city mayor, vice mayor and councilors, as well as members of the Sangguniang Panlalawigan, the vice-governor, governor and representatives for the three districts of Albay in the House of Representatives. These elections were held following the first-past-the-post voting system, in which the candidate with the highest number (but not necessarily a majority) of votes is elected.

== Gubernatorial and Vice Gubernatorial election ==
As with other provinces in the Philippines, the governor, and vice governor of Albay are elected separately. Therefore, they may be of different parties when elected.

=== Governor ===
One-term consecutive, four-term non-consecutive incumbent Governor Al Francis Bichara ran for reelection. Bichara's opponents included broadcast journalist Hermogenes Alegre Jr., self-claimed general Galma Arcilla, Vice Governor Harold Imperial, and retired COMELEC Bicol Regional Director Zacarias Zaragoza. The three perennial candidates who faced Bichara in 2016, Paul Aguilar, Mario Baquil, and Jaime Hernandez Jr., also ran again.
Bichara won reelection to a second consecutive, fifth non-consecutive term.

2019 Albay Gubernatorial Election
Party	Candidate	Votes	%
PDP–Laban	Al Francis Bichara	292,767	53.24
Liberal	Harold Imperial	139,457	25.36
Independent	Hermogenes Alegre, Jr.	91,402	16.62
PM	Galma Arcilla	12,294	2.23
Independent	Paul Aguilar	5,662	1.02
Independent	Jaime Hernandez, Jr.	3,069	0.55
Independent	Mario Baquil	2,620	0.47
Independent	Zacarias Zaragoza	2,611	0.47
Invalid or blank votes		114,516	
Total votes		666,091	
Margin of victory		153,310	27.88
PDP–Laban hold			

=== Vice Governor ===
Incumbent Vice-Governor Harold Imperial is term-limited. He ran for governor instead. Running to replace him are former Quezon City Councilor and Albay First District Representative Edcel Greco Lagman, and Legazpi City Councilor and Albay Councilors League President and ex-officio Board Member Alan Rañola. Bonifacio Regidor withdrew his candidacy for this position.
Lagman won the election for this office.

2019 Albay Vice Gubernatorial Election
Party	Candidate	Votes	%
PDP–Laban	Edcel Greco Lagman	360,013	65.70
NPC	Alan Rañola	187,906	34.29
Invalid or blank votes		116,479	
Total votes		666,091	
Margin of victory		172,107	31.41
PDP–Laban gain from Liberal			

== Congressional elections ==
=== 1st District ===
One-term consecutive, seven-term non-consecutive Representative Edcel Lagman is running for reelection. Facing him is Santo Domingo Mayor Herbie Aguas.
Lagman won reelection to a second consecutive, eighth non-consecutive term.

2019 Philippine House of Representatives election in Albay 1st District
Party	Candidate	Votes	%
Liberal	Edcel Lagman	101,486	54.98
NPC	Herbie Aguas	81,128	43.95
Independent	Hernando Bruce	1,959	1.06
Invalid or blank votes		15,845	
Total votes		200,923	
Margin of victory		20,358	11.03
Liberal hold			

=== 2nd District ===
One-term consecutive, four-term non-consecutive Representative Jose Maria Clemente Salceda sought reelection.
He was reelected to this position.

2019 Philippine House of Representatives election in Albay 2nd District
Party	Candidate	Votes	%
PDP–Laban	Jose Maria Clemente Salceda	187,252	94.64
Independent	Virgilio Goyena	10,603	5.35
Invalid or blank votes		29,560	
Total votes		227,884	
Margin of victory		176,649	89.28
PDP–Laban hold			

=== 3rd District ===
Incumbent Fernando Gonzalez is term-limited. His party nominated his chief of staff, Fernando Cabredo. Former Representative Reno Lim is trying to reclaim this seat. Other candidates are Mario Marcos and Elmer Felix Pornel.
Cabredo was elected to represent this district.

2019 Philippine House of Representatives election in Albay 3rd District
Party	Candidate	Votes	%
PDP–Laban	Fernando Cabredo	107,384	52.18
NPC	Reno Lim	88,745	43.12
Independent	Mario Marcos	8,344	4.05
Independent	Elmer Felix Pornel	1,316	0.63
Invalid or blank votes		30,776	
Total votes		237,284	
Margin of victory		18,639	9.06
PDP–Laban hold			

== Sangguniang Panlalawigan Elections ==
All three legislative districts of Albay will members of the Albay Provincial Board. The first and second districts send three board members each, while the third district sends four board members. The election is via plurality-at-large voting; a voter can vote up to the maximum number of board members his district is sending as apportioned.

Party	Votes	%	Seats
Partido Demokratiko Pilipino-Lakas ng Bayan	580,757	42.77	5
Liberal Party	425,381	31.33	3
United Nationalist Alliance	137,745	10.14	1
Pederalismo ng Dugong Dakilang Samahan	58,835	4.33	0
Nationalist People's Coalition	51,097	3.76	0
Independent	104,059	7.66	1
Ex officio seats			3
Total	1,357,874	100.00	13

=== 1st District ===
Freshmen incumbent Board Members Reynaldo Bragais and Victor Ziga Jr. ran for reelection. Board Member Job Belen is term-limited and ran for Malilipot Vice Mayor. Also vying for this position are multi-level marketing company head Jose Betito, former Board Member Baby Glenda Bongao, and Tabaco City Councilor Sheina Onrubia.

2019 Provincial Board Election in Albay 1st District
Party	Candidate	Votes	%
Liberal	Reynaldo Bragais	105,383	25.63
UNA	Victor Ziga, Jr.	85,639	20.83
Liberal	Baby Glenda Bongao	80,651	19.61
Liberal	Sheina Onrubia	80,562	19.59
PDDS	Jose Betito	58,835	14.31
Invalid or blank votes		188,514	
Total votes		602,769	

=== 2nd District ===
One-term incumbent Board Member Raul Rosal ran for reelection. Board Member Ralph Andes is term-limited while two-term Senior Board Member Richard Benjamin Imperial retired. Also vying for this position are Legazpi City Councilors Melissa Abadeza and Jesus Chito Baldo, Political dynasty candidates Ivan Andes and Maria Paz Salud Imperial, and Daraga Councilor and former board member Neil Montallana.

2019 Provincial Board Election in Albay 2nd District
Party	Candidate	Votes	%
Independent	Raul Rosal	104,059	22.91
PDP–Laban	Melissa Abadeza	100,266	22.07
PDP–Laban	Neil Montallana	70,278	15.47
Liberal	Maria Paz Salud Imperial	69,343	15.26
PDP–Laban	Ivan Andes	59,070	13.00
NPC	Jesus Chito Baldo	51,097	11.25
Invalid or blank votes		222,150	
Total votes		683,652	

=== 3rd District ===
Neophyte incumbent Board Members Dante Arandia, Howard Sim Imperial, Eva Josephine Ribaya, and Jesus Salceda Jr. ran for reelection. Libon Councilor Mark Ian Cortes also ran for this position.

2019 Provincial Board Election in Albay 3rd District
Party	Candidate	Votes	%
PDP–Laban	Jesus Salceda, Jr.	136,983	27.83
PDP–Laban	Dante Arandia	110,086	22.37
PDP–Laban	Eva Josephine Ribaya	104,074	21.15
Liberal	Howard Sim Imperial	89,442	18.17
UNA	Mark Ian Cortes	51,458	10.45
Invalid or blank votes		453,017	
Total votes		949,136	

== City and municipal elections ==
All cities and municipalities of Albay will elect its mayor and vice-mayor this election. The candidates for mayor and vice mayor with the plurality of votes wins the seat. The mayor and vice mayor are elected separately; therefore, they may be of different parties when they are elected. However, these candidates may form a de facto coalition wherein a mayoral and vice mayoral candidate of different party affiliation will campaign together with a slate of candidates for councilors.

=== 1st District ===
- City:Tabaco
- Municipalities: Bacacay, Malilipot, Malinao, Santo Domingo, Tiwi

==== Tabaco City ====
One-term consecutive, three-term nonconsecutive incumbent Mayor Cielo Krisel Lagman-Luistro is running for reelection.

2019 Tabaco City Mayoral election
Party	Candidate	Votes	%
Liberal	Cielo Krisel Lagman-Luistro	42,372	69.13
Independent	Pedro Angelico Berces	18,913	30.86
Invalid or blank votes		3,066	
Total votes		64,466	
Margin of victory		23,459	38.28
Liberal hold			

One-term incumbent Vice Mayor Nestor San Pablo is unopposed for reelection.

2019 Tabaco City Vice Mayoral election
Party	Candidate	Votes	%
Liberal	Nestor San Pablo	45,424	100.00
Invalid or blank votes		18,927	
Total votes		64,466	
Margin of victory		45,424	100.00
Liberal hold			

==== Bacacay ====
One-term Incumbent Armando Romano is running for reelection. Running against him are Gil Bea, and topnotcher Councilor Edsel Belleza.

2019 Bacacay Mayoral election
Party	Candidate	Votes	%
PDP–Laban	Armando Romano	21,037	60.56
NPC	Gil Bea	10,789	31.06
Independent	Edsel Belleza	1,743	5.01
Independent	Rolando Bermundo	664	1.91
PDDS	Pee Jay Lim	499	1.43
Invalid or blank votes		2,774	
Total votes		37,657	
Margin of victory		10,248	29.50
PDP–Laban hold			

One-term incumbent Vice Mayor Divina Gracia Bonavente is challenged for reelection by former Mayor Tobias Betito.

2019 Bacacay Vice Mayoral election
Party	Candidate	Votes	%
PDP–Laban	Divina Gracia Bonavente	21,524	64.66
Independent	Tobias Betito	11,184	33.59
Independent	Jose Florante Osila	579	1.73
Invalid or blank votes		4,219	
Total votes		37,657	100.00
Margin of victory		10,340	31.07
PDP–Laban hold			

==== Malilipot ====
One-term Incumbent Cenon Volante is running for reelection. Former Mayor Roli Volante, whom Cenon unseated in the 2016 election, sought a rematch.

2019 Malilipot Mayoral election
Party	Candidate	Votes	%
NPC	Roli Volante	11,661	50.44
PDP–Laban	Cenon Volante	11,317	48.95
Independent	Richard Bo	138	0.59
Invalid or blank votes		568	
Total votes		23,722	
Margin of victory		344	1.49
NPC gain from PDP–Laban			

One-term incumbent Vice Mayor Johanes Ampig is challenged for reelection by Board Member Job Belen and dynastic candidate Rolando Volante.

2019 Malilipot Vice Mayoral election
Party	Candidate	Votes	%
NPC	Rolando Volante	11,411	51.09
PDP–Laban	Johanes Ampig	7,833	35.07
Kusog Bikolandia	Job Belen	3,090	13.83
Invalid or blank votes		1,350	
Total votes		23,722	
Margin of victory		3,578	16.02
NPC gain from PDP–Laban			

==== Malinao ====
One-term consecutive, three-term nonconsecutive incumbent Mayor Avelino Ceriola had been dismissed from his position by the Office of the Ombudsman. This is in connection with the graft and administrative cases filed against him for the alleged illegal construction and operation of a cockpit arena that he owned; but he refused to step down. He was later unseated and his 2016 opponent, former Mayor Alicia Morales took over this office. Mayor Morales will face former Mayor Emiliana Kare and Councilor Lenybelle Santos.

2019 Malinao Mayoral election
Party	Candidate	Votes	%
Kusog Bikolandia	Lenybelle Santos	11,482	47.98
PDP–Laban	Alicia Morales	9,541	39.87
PFP	Emiliana Kare	2,903	12.13
Invalid or blank votes		1,129	
Total votes		25,127	
Margin of victory		1,941	8.11
Kusog Bikolandia gain from PDP–Laban			

Two-term incumbent Vice Mayor Sheryl Bilo is running for reelection.

2019 Malinao Vice Mayoral election
Party	Candidate	Votes	%
PDP–Laban	Sheryl Bilo	11,306	49.67
Kusog Bikolandia	Ernalyn Solisa	10,271	45.12
PFP	Virlyn Aycocho	1,184	5.20
Invalid or blank votes		2,294	
Total votes		25,127	
Margin of victory		1,035	4.55
PDP–Laban hold			

==== Santo Domingo ====
Incumbent Herbie Aguas is term-limited and is running for representative. Former Councilor Joseling Aguas Jr. is his party's nominee. Vice Mayor Nomar Banda and resort owner Noel Estillomo are also seeking the mayoralty position.

2019 Santo Domingo Mayoral election
Party	Candidate	Votes	%
NPC	Joseling Aguas, Jr.	8,766	43.09
Kusog Bikolandia	Noel Estillomo	5,898	28.99
Independent	Nomar Banda	5,679	27.91
Invalid or blank votes		889	
Total votes		20,911	
Margin of victory		2,868	14.10
NPC hold			

One-term incumbent Vice Mayor Nomar Banda is running for mayor. Councilor Marvin Oringo is running for this position.

2019 Santo Domingo Vice Mayoral election
Party	Candidate	Votes	%
Liberal	Marvin Oringo	15,182	87.26
Independent	Paolo Biñas	2,216	12.73
Invalid or blank votes		3,483	
Total votes		20,911	
Margin of victory		12,966	74.53
Liberal gain from Independent			

==== Tiwi ====
One-term consecutive, four term nonconsecutive incumbent Mayor Jaime Villanueva is facing a rematch with former Mayor Leo Templado.

2019 Tiwi Mayoral election
Party	Candidate	Votes	%
PDP–Laban	Jaime Villanueva	15,563	55.65
NPC	Leo Templado	12,400	44.34
Invalid or blank votes		978	
Total votes		29,040	
Margin of victory		3,163	11.31
PDP–Laban hold			

Two-term incumbent Vice Mayor David Beato is being challenged for this office by topnotcher Councilor Rebecca Lizardo.

2019 Tiwi Vice Mayoral election
Party	Candidate	Votes	%
PDP–Laban	David Beato	14,904	55.63
NPC	Rebecca Lizardo	11,884	44.36
Invalid or blank votes		2,153	
Total votes		29,040	
Margin of victory		3,020	11.27
PDP–Laban hold			

=== 2nd District ===
- City: Legazpi
- Municipalities: Camalig, Daraga, Manito, Rapu-rapu

==== Legazpi City ====
Two-term consecutive, five-term nonconsecutive incumbent Mayor Noel Rosal is running for reelection.

2019 Legazpi City Mayoral election
Party	Candidate	Votes	%
PDP–Laban	Noel Rosal	82,771	95.93
Independent	Emmanuel Nabor	3,507	4.06
Invalid or blank votes		13,411	
Total votes		99,866	
Margin of victory		79,210	91.81
PDP–Laban hold			

One-term incumbent Vice Mayor Oscar Robert Cristobal is unopposed for reelection.

2019 Legazpi City Vice Mayoral election
Party	Candidate	Votes	%
PDP–Laban	Oscar Robert Cristobal	73,295	100.00
Invalid or blank votes		26,394	
Total votes		99,866	
Margin of victory		73,295	100.00
PDP–Laban hold			

==== Camalig ====
One-term incumbent Mayor Maria Ahrdail Baldo is swapping posts with one-term incumbent Vice Mayor Carlos Irwin Baldo Jr. Both of them are running unopposed.

2019 Camalig Mayoral election
Party	Candidate	Votes	%
PDP–Laban	Carlos Irwin Baldo, Jr.	18,987	100.00
Invalid or blank votes		14,824	
Total votes		33,885	
Margin of victory		18,987	100.00
PDP–Laban hold			

2019 Camalig Vice Mayoral election
Party	Candidate	Votes	%
PDP–Laban	Maria Ahrdail Baldo	18,368	100.00
Invalid or blank votes		15,443	
Total votes		33,885	
Margin of victory		18,368	100.00
PDP–Laban hold			

==== Daraga ====
Three-term consecutive, five-term nonconsecutive Mayor Gerry Jaucian died on May 4, 2018. Then Vice Mayor Carlwyn Baldo ascended to this office. Baldo is seeking a full term in this position. He sought this office in 2010 and 2013, losing both times to Jaucian. He won as Vice Mayor in a fractured field in 2016, defeating the then, two-term consecutive, five-term nonconsecutive incumbent vice mayor. He is facing off with three-term Ako Bicol Representative Rodel Batocabe and elevated Vice Mayor Victor Perete.

On December 22, 2018, Batocabe was attending a gift-giving event for senior citizens and persons with disabilities in the rural barangay of Burgos of the municipality when two men approached and shot him. His police escort, Senior Police Officer 2 Orlando Diaz, was also killed, while seven elderly attendees were also wounded in the attack. Batocabe and Diaz were taken to a hospital in Legazpi City, where both were pronounced dead.

On January 3, 2019, Philippine National Police Director General Oscar Albayalde announced in a press conference that Mayor Carlwyn Baldo is the suspected mastermind for the murder of Representative Batocabe. According to the police, Baldo hired six men to kill Batocabe and set up $95,000 in funds to pay for the murder. The plot had allegedly been in the works since August 2018, when Baldo supplied $4,600 to one of the hitmen to purchase guns and motorcycles. Mayor Carlwyn Baldo denied the allegations in a statement read over the phone to local radio stations, calling himself " a convenient scapegoat."

On January 6, 2019, Lakas–CMD said that it has revoked its Certificate of Nomination and Acceptance (CONA) for Baldo. Batocabe's party, the National Unity Party named his widow, Gertrudes, as his substitute. However, Representative Batocabe's name is going to remain on the ballot.

On May 6, 2019, the Legazpi City Regional Trial Court ordered the arrest of Baldo for the murder of Batocabe and his police escort. While the police said that Baldo has sent word that he would immediately surrender when he is served arrest warrants, he was declared by the police as a "wanted person" after failure to serve his warrant of arrest two days after its issuance. Baldo surrendered on May 10, 2019, four days after the court issued the warrant for his arrest.

2019 Daraga Mayoral election
Party	Candidate	Votes	%
PDP–Laban	Victor Perete	24,616	40.32
NUP	Rodel Batocabe (†)	19,859	32.53
Independent	Carlwyn Baldo	16,564	27.13
Invalid or blank votes		2,142	
Total votes		63,276	
Margin of victory		4,757	7.79
PDP–Laban gain from Independent			

One-term incumbent Vice Mayor Carlwyn Baldo assumed the Office of the Mayor after the death of Mayor Gerry Jaucian. Topnotcher Councilor Victor Perete was then elevated into the position of Vice Mayor. Vice Mayor Perete forwent election for a full term and is running for Mayor instead. Former Councilor Joseph Espinas and incumbent Councilors Gerry Raphael Jaucian Jr. and Joey Marcellana are facing off for this post.

2019 Daraga Vice Mayoral election
Party	Candidate	Votes	%
PDP–Laban	Gerry Raphael Jaucian, Jr.	27,954	49.25
Liberal	Joey Marcellana	16,121	28.40
PDDS	Joseph Espinas	12,675	22.33
Invalid or blank votes		6,431	
Total votes		63,276	
Margin of victory		11,833	20.85
PDP–Laban hold			

==== Manito ====
One-term incumbent Joshua Mari Daep is running for reelection. Challenging him is 2016 mayoral candidate Rebecca Chen.

2019 Manito Mayoral election
Party	Candidate	Votes	%
PDP–Laban	Joshua Mari Daep	7,377	57.06
PDDS	Rebecca Chen	5,425	41.96
Independent	Jerry Daen	126	0.97
Invalid or blank votes		488	
Total votes		13,480	
Margin of victory		1,952	15.10
PDP–Laban hold			

One-term incumbent Vice Mayor Carlito Belludo is running for reelection. His challengers include former Councilor Marjun Dagsil, Councilor Arly Guiriba and Diego Lopez.

2019 Manito Vice Mayoral election
Party	Candidate	Votes	%
PDP–Laban	Carlito Belludo	3,774	30.12
Independent	Arly Guiriba	3,383	27.00
PDDS	Diego Lopez	3,297	26.31
Independent	Marjun Dagsil	2,073	16.54
Invalid or blank votes		889	
Total votes		13,480	
Margin of victory		391	3.12
PDP–Laban hold			

==== Rapu-rapu ====
Two-term incumbent Mayor Ronald Galicia is running for reelection. He is being challenged by Fiel Vizcaya.

2019 Rapu-rapu Mayoral election
Party	Candidate	Votes	%
PDP–Laban	Ronald Galicia	10,175	62.02
Independent	Fiel Vizcaya	6,229	37.97
Invalid or blank votes		914	
Total votes		17,377	
Margin of victory		3,946	24.06
PDP–Laban hold			

Two-term incumbent Vice Mayor Nora Oñate is vying for a final consecutive term in office. Her challenger is Amando de la Cruz Jr.

2019 Rapu-rapu Vice Mayoral election
Party	Candidate	Votes	%
PDP–Laban	Nora Oñate	8,260	54.01
PDDS	Amando de la Cruz, Jr.	7,031	45.98
Invalid or blank votes		2,027	
Total votes		17,377	
Margin of victory		1,229	8.04
PDP–Laban hold			

=== 3rd District ===
- City: Ligao
- Municipalities: Guinobatan, Jovellar, Libon, Oas, Pio Duran, Polangui

==== Ligao City ====
Incumbent Mayor Patricia Alsua is running for a third term in office.

2019 Ligao City Mayoral election
Party	Candidate	Votes	%
PDP–Laban	Patricia Alsua	38,572	87.30
Independent	Roman Jaucian	3,578	8.09
PFP	Rey Prollamante	2,030	4.59
Invalid or blank votes		7,324	
Total votes		51,607	
Margin of victory		34,994	79.21
PDP–Laban hold			

One-term incumbent Vice Mayor Sherwin Quising is running for city councilor. Running to replace him are City Councilors Manuel Garcia, and Teodorico Residilla Jr.

2019 Ligao City Vice Mayoral election
Party	Candidate	Votes	%
PDP–Laban	Teodorico Residilla, Jr.	24,001	53.22
Independent	Manuel Garcia	21,098	46.78
Invalid or blank votes		6,405	
Total votes		51,607	
Margin of victory		2,903	6.44
PDP–Laban hold			

==== Guinobatan ====
Incumbent Mayor Ann Ongjoco is unopposed for a final, consecutive term in office.

2019 Guinobatan Mayoral election
Party	Candidate	Votes	%
PDP–Laban	Ann Ongjoco	35,341	100.00
Invalid or blank votes		7,941	
Total votes		43,395	
Margin of victory		35,341	100.00
PDP–Laban hold			

Two-term incumbent Vice Mayor Julio Tingzon, IV is challenged for reelection by topnotcher Councilor Rolando Palabrica.

2019 Guinobatan Vice Mayoral election
Party	Candidate	Votes	%
NPC	Rolando Palabrica	21,586	53.43
PDP–Laban	Julio Tingzon, IV	18,813	46.56
Invalid or blank votes		2,883	
Total votes		43,395	
Margin of victory		2,773	6.86
NPC gain from PDP–Laban			

==== Jovellar ====
Incumbent Mayor Jorem Arcangel is term-limited and is running for Vice Mayor. His party nominated topnotcher Councilor Joseph Arcangel, who will run unopposed for this position.

2019 Jovellar Mayoral election
Party	Candidate	Votes	%
PDP–Laban	Joseph Arcangel	7,448	100.00
Invalid or blank votes		1,493	
Total votes		8,976	
Margin of victory		7,448	100.00
PDP–Laban hold			

Incumbent Vice Mayor Jose Nobleza Jr. is term-limited and is running for municipal councilor. Mayor Jorem Arcangel will run unopposed for this position.

2019 Jovellar Vice Mayoral election
Party	Candidate	Votes	%
PDP–Laban	Jorem Arcangel	7,331	100.00
Invalid or blank votes		1,610	
Total votes		8,976	
Margin of victory		7,331	100.00
PDP–Laban gain from Independent			

==== Libon ====
One-term incumbent Mayor Wilfredo Maronilla is unopposed for reelection.

2019 Libon Mayoral election
Party	Candidate	Votes	%
PDP–Laban	Wilfredo Maronilla	22,424	100.00
Invalid or blank votes		10,339	
Total votes		32,885	
Margin of victory		22,424	100.00
PDP–Laban hold			

One-term incumbent Vice Mayor Markgregor Edward Sayson is unopposed for reelection.

2019 Libon Mayoral election
Party	Candidate	Votes	%
PDP–Laban	Markgregor Edward Sayson	21,255	100.00
Invalid or blank votes		11,508	
Total votes		32,885	
Margin of victory		21,255	100.00
PDP–Laban hold			

==== Oas ====
One-term incumbent Mayor Domingo Escoto Jr. is running for reelection. His opponents are former Mayor Gregorio Ricarte and Vice Mayor Antonio Yuchongco II.

2019 Oas Mayoral election
Party	Candidate	Votes	%
PDP–Laban	Domingo Escoto, Jr.	11,304	38.09
Kusog Bikolandia	Gregorio Ricarte	10,704	36.07
NPC	Antonio Yuchongco II	7,663	25.82
Invalid or blank votes		1,550	
Total votes		31,331	
Margin of victory		600	2.02
PDP–Laban hold			

One-term incumbent Vice Mayor Antonio Yuchongco, II is running for mayor. His party nominated municipal Councilor Reene Raro. He will be facing Barangay Chairman of San Isidro, and concurrent Oas ABC President, ex-officio municipal Councilor Joseph Rentosa.

2019 Oas Vice Mayoral election
Party	Candidate	Votes	%
NPC	Reene Raro	14,885	57.72
PDP–Laban	Joseph Rentosa	10,900	42.27
Invalid or blank votes		5,436	
Total votes		31,331	
Margin of victory		3,855	15.45
NPC hold			

==== Pio Duran ====
Incumbent Mayor Alan Arandia is unopposed for a second term in office.

2019 Pio Duran Mayoral election
Party	Candidate	Votes	%
PDP–Laban	Alan Arandia	17,296	100.00
Invalid or blank votes		7,392	
Total votes		24,824	
Margin of victory		17,296	100.00
PDP–Laban hold			

One-term incumbent Vice Mayor Marvin Quiroz is challenged for reelection by former Mayor Henry Callope.

2019 Pio Duran Vice Mayoral election
Party	Candidate	Votes	%
PDP–Laban	Marvin Quiroz	13,167	58.78
Independent	Henry Callope	9,233	41.21
Invalid or blank votes		2,288	
Total votes		24,824	
Margin of victory		3,934	17.57
PDP–Laban hold			

==== Polangui ====
Incumbent Mayor Cherilie Sampal is term-limited. Her party nominated political dynasty candidate Norman Sampal. Vice Mayor Herbert Borja, and Councilor Andy Mariscotes are also running for this open seat.

2019 Polangui Mayoral election
Party	Candidate	Votes	%
Independent	Andy Mariscotes	15,032	35.70
PDP–Laban	Norman Sampal	13,666	32.46
Kusog Bikolandia	Herbert Borja	12,694	30.15
Independent	Christopher Napoleon Reolo	709	1.68
Invalid or blank votes		2,065	
Total votes		44,266	
Margin of victory		1,366	3.24
Independent gain from PDP–Laban			

One-term incumbent Vice Mayor Herbert Borja is running for mayor. Running for this position are former Vice Mayor Renato Borja, municipal Councilor Restituto Fernandez, and Dexter Salinel.

2019 Polangui Vice Mayoral election
Party	Candidate	Votes	%
PDP–Laban	Restituto Fernandez	19,895	50.51
Independent	Renato Borja	17,711	44.97
Independent	Dexter Salinel	1,777	4.51
Invalid or blank votes		4,783	
Total votes		44,266	
Margin of victory		2,184	5.54
PDP–Laban gain from Kusog Bicolandia			

=== Maps ===
Results of 2019 Albay Vice Gubernatorial Elections by Municipality

Results of 2019 Albay Congressional Elections

Results of 2019 Albay Congressional Elections by Municipality

Results of 2019 Mayoral Elections in Albay by Municipality and City

Results of 2019 Vice Mayoral Elections in Albay by Municipality and City
