= Bobby Cristobal =

Filipino politician

The Honorable Bobby Cristobal
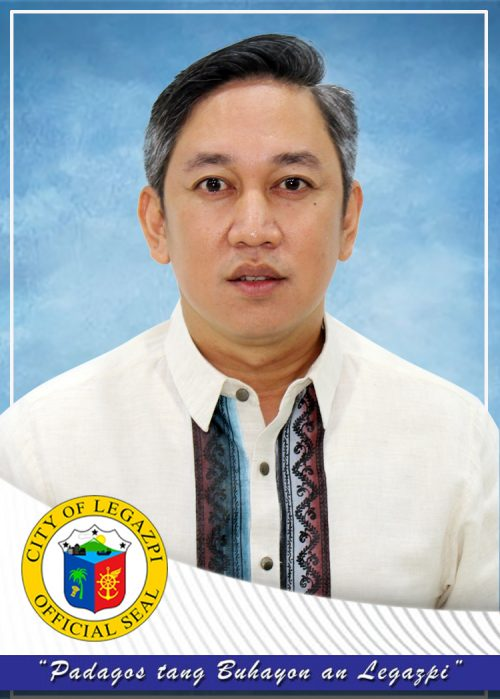
- Former Vice Mayor of Legazpi City

Vice Mayor of Legazpi City
- In office June 30, 2022 – June 30, 2025

Office of the Vice Mayor, Legazpi City
- In office June 30, 2019 – June 30, 2022
- In office June 30, 2016 – June 30, 2019

Board Member, 2nd District of Albay
- In office June 30, 2013 – June 30, 2016

Punong Barangay, Rawis, Legazpi City
- In office November 30, 2010 – June 30, 2013

City Councilor of Legazpi City
- In office June 30, 2007 – June 30, 2010

Personal details
- Born: Oscar Robert Hidalgo Cristobal; July 20, 1982 (age 44) Legazpi, Albay, Philippines
- Party: KANP (2021–present)
- Other political affiliations: PDP–Laban (2018–2021); Liberal (2012-2018)
- Spouse: Vic Marbella - Cristobal
- Children: 2
- Education: Bicol University; University of Santo Tomas-Legazpi
- Website: https://legazpi.gov.ph/legislative/

Oscar Robert Hidalgo Cristobal, also known as Bobby Cristobal, was a Filipino politician. He served as an incumbent vice mayor of Legazpi, Albay from 2016 to 2025. He was also a presiding officer. In the 2022 election, he won against Alan O. Rañola. He is currently married to Vic Marbella. Today, he is appointed by Governor Noel Rosal as the APSEMO Department Head of Province of Albay.

== Background ==
Cristobal was born on July 20, 1982, to his parents Oscar Cristobal and Ma. Cristina Hidalgo. His four brothers in the family are named Gene, Francis Carlo, Raymund and Choy.

Currently, he is a husband, was a government official, a public servant and a father of two kids.

He is now the APSEMO Department Head of Province of Albay.

== Political career ==
He served in the Sangguniang Panlalawigan of Legazpi as Board Member for the 2nd District of Albay from 2013 to 2016. He later run as a vice Mayor of Legazpi City and won in 2016 election by 44,186 votes against Bitoy Roces of Nacionalista Party with 40,602 votes.

For the second time, he won the election under PDP-Laban with 73,295 votes as a lone candidate for vice mayor of Legazpi.

For his third term, he run again and won the election under Katipunan ng Nagkakaisang Pilipino with 56,380 votes against Alan O. Rañola of Aksyon Demokratiko with 50,465 votes.
