= Al Francis Bichara =

Filipino politician

The Honorable Al Francis Bichara
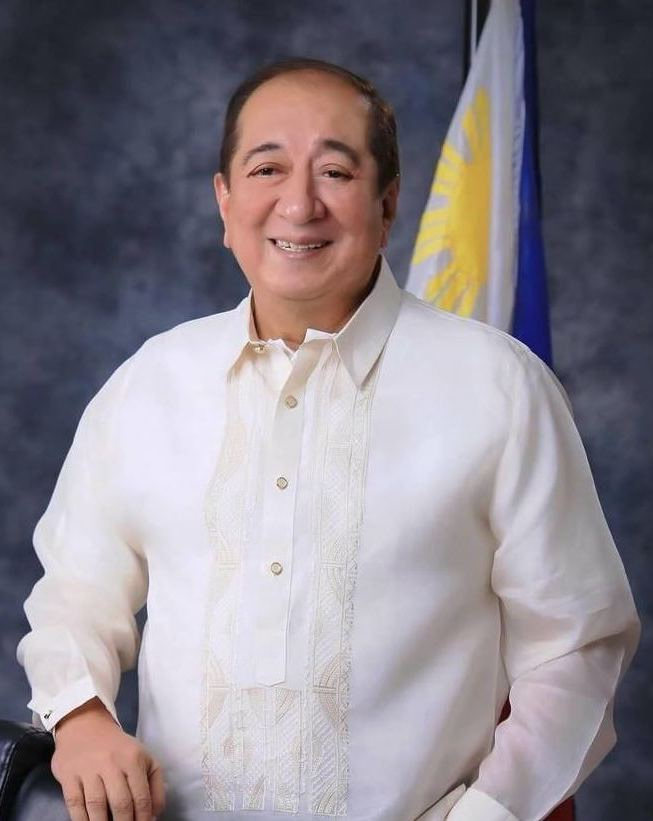

24th Governor of Albay
- In office June 30, 2016 – June 30, 2022
- Vice Governor: Harold Ong Imperial (2016–2019); Edcel Greco Lagman (2019–2022)
- Preceded by: Joey Salceda
- Succeeded by: Noel Rosal
- In office June 30, 1995 – June 30, 2004
- Vice Governor: Danilo S. Azaña (1995–1998); Rodolfo P. Ante (1998); Silverio C. Cope (1998); Jesus James B. Calisin (1998–2004)
- Preceded by: Victor San Andres Ziga
- Succeeded by: Fernando V. Gonzalez

Member of the Philippine House of Representatives from Albay's 2nd congressional district
- In office June 30, 2007 – June 30, 2016
- Preceded by: Carlos R. Imperial
- Succeeded by: Joey Salceda

Member of the Philippine House of Representatives from Albay's 3rd congressional district
- In office June 30, 1992 – June 30, 1995
- Preceded by: Efren R. Sarte
- Succeeded by: Romeo R. Salalima

Mayor of Ligao
- In office 1986 – June 30, 1992

Personal details
- Born: September 17, 1952 (age 74) Ligao, Albay, Philippines
- Party: PDP–Laban (2016-present)
- Other political affiliations: Nacionalista (2007–2016); NPC (1992–2007)
- Education: University of Santo Tomas–Legazpi (BS, MA)
- Occupation: Politician, diplomat
- Profession: Civil Engineer

Al Francis C. Bichara (born September 17, 1952) is a Filipino politician and former provincial governor of Albay in the Bicol Region of the Philippines from 1995 to 2004 and again from 2016 to 2022.

A civil engineer by profession, Bichara's political career began when he served as mayor of Ligao City from 1986 to 1992. In 1992, Bichara was elected to the House of Representatives, representing the 3rd District of Albay. After one term in the House, Bichara was elected governor of Albay in 1995. He was re-elected as governor in 1998 and 2001.

After the expiration of his third consecutive term as governor in 2004, Bichara was appointed Ambassador to Lebanon by President Gloria Macapagal Arroyo. The 2006 Lebanon War broke out during his tenure as Ambassador, and he drew attention when he threatened to halt the evacuation of Filipinos in Lebanon due to the lack of funds.

In 2007, Bichara returned to the House of Representatives, this time winning election as the Representative from the 2nd District of Albay. In 2016, he ran for governor under the Nacionalista Party and won. In 2019, he once again ran for re-election as governor this time under the PDP–Laban and won.

Political offices
Preceded by Joey Salceda	Governor of Albay; 2016–2022	Succeeded by Noel Rosal
House of Representatives of the Philippines
Preceded by Carlos R. Imperial	Member of the House of Representatives from Albay's 2nd district 2007–2016	Succeeded by Joey Salceda
Preceded by Efren R. Sarte	Member of the House of Representatives from Albay's 3rd district 1992–1995	Succeeded by Romeo R. Salalima
