= Spice Boys (House of Representatives of the Philippines) =

Group of young congressmen against Joseph Estrada in 1998 to 2001

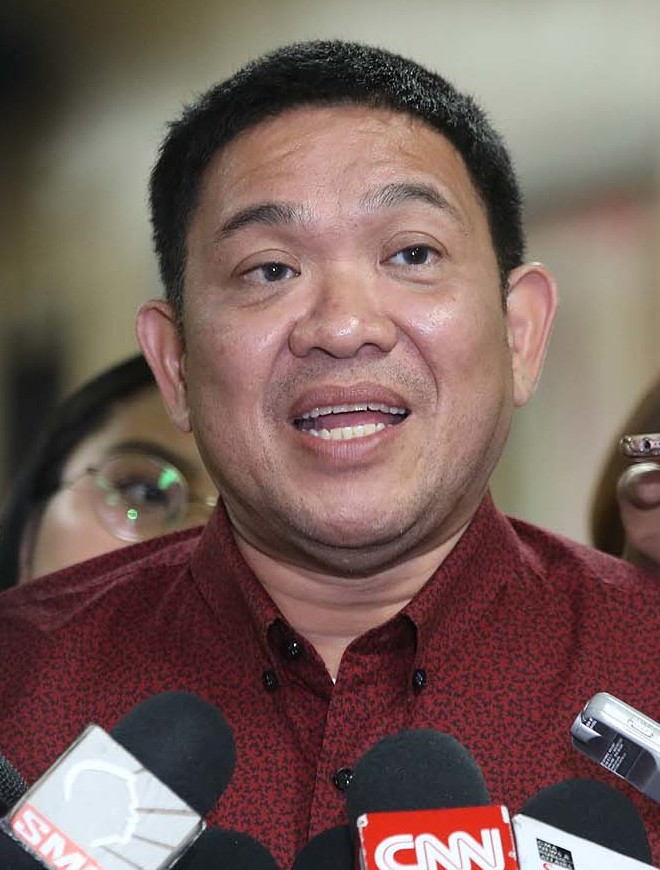
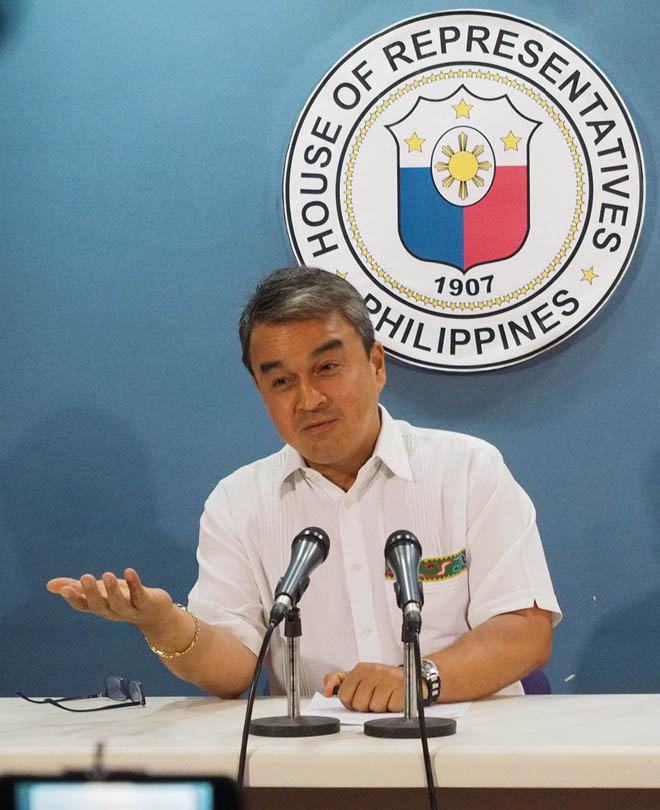
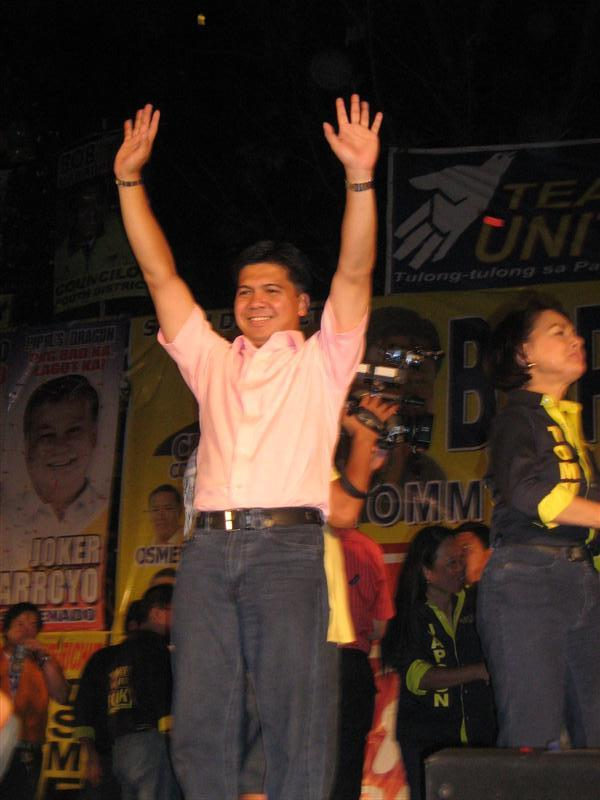
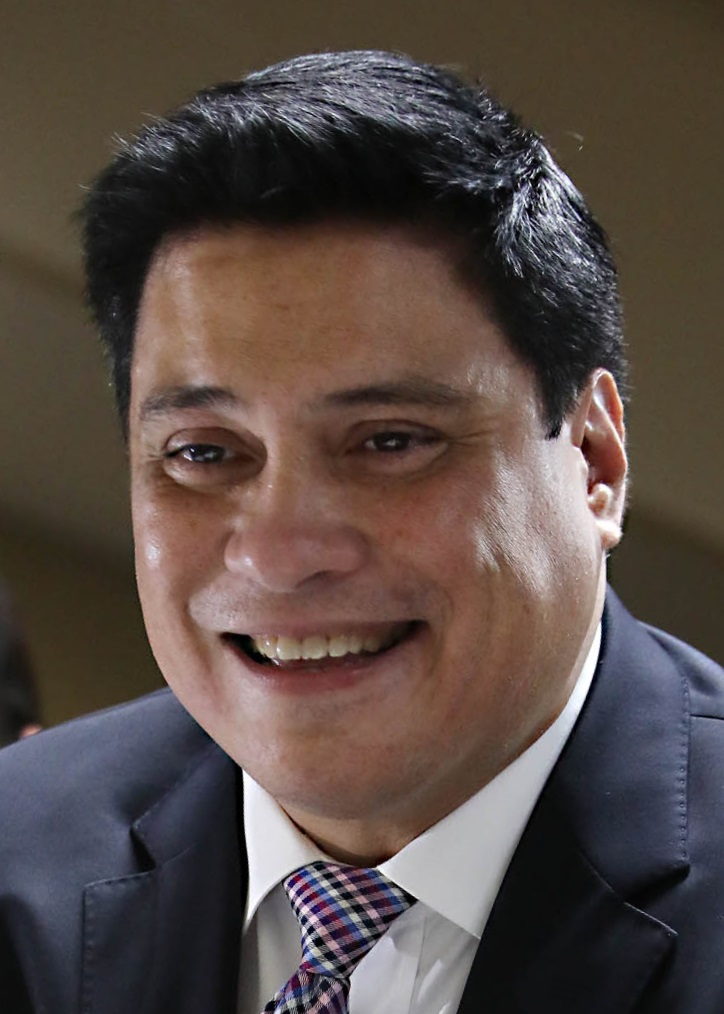
The Spice Boys

The Spice Boys were six neophyte and two-term congressmen of the House of Representatives of the Philippines openly critical of the administration during Joseph Estrada's term as President of the Philippines. The group's name is an allusion to the British girl-group, the Spice Girls. They also played a key role in Estrada's removal from office.

The Estrada administration's equivalent of this opposition clique was a seven-member group of congressmen Estrada christened as the "Bright Boys".

== Background ==
The 1998 Philippine general election ushered in a wave of neophyte congressmen into the House of Representatives, filling 140 seats of the 220-seat Lower House. About a fifth of its members were under 40 years of age, roughly equivalent to Generation X. This influx of young blood changed the way legislative business was undertaken and the image of the Filipino politician, most of whom were derided as trapos or "TRAditional POliticians". Incidentally, the Spanish word trapo means "rag", as in rag doll or dish rag.

After Lakas–NUCD was reduced to 25 members at the height of the Charter-change debate in 1999 and became the minority bloc in the House, six young congressmen became media sensations due to their fervent opposition to the issue of making changes to the Philippine Constitution. This group came to be dubbed by the media as the "Spice Boys", effectively becoming the face and voice of the opposition. As of 2001, the members of the group are no longer in the opposition and are holding positions in the Cabinet or Congress.

== Composition ==
The group consisted of:

1. Rolando Andaya, Jr. (Lakas) – 1st District, Camarines Sur
2. Robert Ace Barbers (Lakas) – 2nd District, Surigao del Norte
3. Michael Defensor (Liberal) – 3rd District, Quezon City
4. Hernani Braganza (Lakas) – 1st District, Pangasinan
5. Federico Sandoval II (Lakas) – Navotas-Malabon
6. Migz Zubiri (Lakas) – 3rd District, Bukidnon
7. Magtanggol Gunigundo II (Lakas) – lone District, Valenzuela
8. Oscar Moreno (Lakas) – 1st District, Misamis Oriental

== Post EDSA II ==
After the Second EDSA Revolution, the Spice Boys were assigned key positions in the Arroyo administration. In 2003, the Spice Boys pledged their support for Gloria Macapagal Arroyo's 2004 Presidential campaign. In 2004, three were given committee chairmanships in the House of Representatives. Andaya became chairman of the appropriations committee; Barbers headed the accounts committee, and Zubiri, the committee on legislative franchises. Defensor became head of the Housing and Urban Development Coordinating Council, while Braganza took over as agrarian reform secretary.

== See also ==
- 11th Congress of the Philippines
- Bright Boys, the congressional pro-Estrada counterpart of the Spice Boys
- Other groups sharing the same moniker:
  - Bombay Talkie, a Bhangra band which also became known as "The Spice Boys" after a BBC documentary of the same name
  - Spice Boys (footballers), group of high-profile footballers who played for Liverpool F.C. in the 1990s
