= Mike Defensor =

Filipino politician and businessman (born 1969)

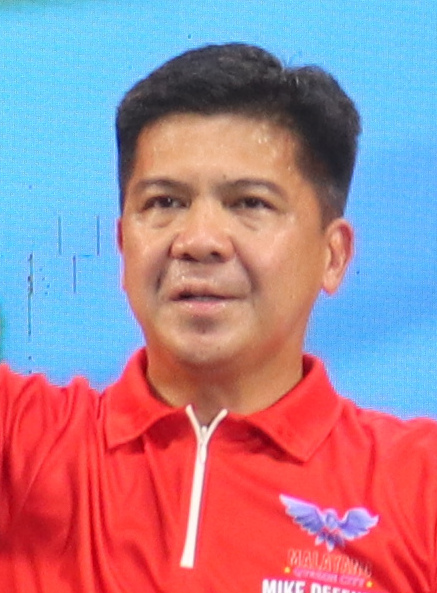
- Defensor in 2022

Member of the Philippine House of Representatives for Anakalusugan
- In office June 30, 2019 – June 30, 2022

Malacañang Chief of Staff
- In office February 15, 2006 – February 10, 2007
- President: Gloria Macapagal Arroyo
- Preceded by: Rigoberto Tiglao
- Succeeded by: Joey Salceda

28th Secretary of Environment and Natural Resources
- In office August 31, 2004 – February 15, 2006
- President: Gloria Macapagal Arroyo
- Preceded by: Elisa Gozun
- Succeeded by: Angelo Reyes

1st Chairman of the Housing and Urban Development Coordinating Council
- In office January 20, 2001 – June 30, 2004
- President: Gloria Macapagal Arroyo
- Preceded by: Karina Constantino David
- Succeeded by: Noli de Castro

Member of the Philippine House of Representatives from Quezon City's 3rd district
- In office June 30, 1995 – January 20, 2001
- Preceded by: Dennis Roldan
- Succeeded by: Maria Theresa Defensor

Member of the Quezon City Council from the 3rd district
- In office June 30, 1992 – June 30, 1995

Personal details
- Born: Michael Tan Defensor; June 30, 1969 (age 57) Manila, Philippines
- Party: Reform PH (2024–present)
- Other political affiliations: See list: PFP (2021–2024); Anakalusugan (partylist; 2019–2022); PDP–Laban (2018–2021); PRP (2009–2018); Lakas (2007–2009); Liberal (1995–2007); LDP (1992–1995)
- Spouse: Julie Rose Tactacan
- Relations: Miriam Defensor Santiago (aunt); Arthur Defensor Jr. (second cousin); Lorenz Defensor (second cousin)
- Children: 5
- Parents: Matias Defensor Jr. (father); Florence Tan Defensor (mother)
- Education: University of the Philippines Diliman (BA, MPA)
- Occupation: Politician; businessman
- Criminal information
- Status: Incarcerated; awaiting trial
- Criminal charge: Plunder

Details
- Date apprehended: July 6, 2026
- Imprisoned at: New Quezon City Jail

Michael Tan Defensor (Tagalog pronunciation: [dɪfɛnˈsɔɾ], born June 30, 1969) is a Filipino politician and businessman who served as the party-list representative for Anakalusugan from 2019 to 2022. He is also the chief executive officer of Pax Libera Mining, Inc.

A member of the Defensor political family, Defensor is the nephew of former senator Miriam Defensor Santiago. He began his political career in Quezon City, where he served as a member of the city council from 1992 to 1995. He was elected to the House of Representatives representing Quezon City's 3rd congressional district in 1995, becoming the youngest member of Congress at the time. As a congressman, he was a member of the "Spice Boys", who led congressional efforts to impeach President Joseph Estrada. The impeachment trial and the widespread protests of the Second EDSA Revolution in January 2001 resulted in Estrada's resignation and Vice President Gloria Macapagal Arroyo's accession to the presidency.

Defensor later served in various positions in the Arroyo administration, including chairman of the Housing and Urban Development Coordinating Council, Secretary of Environment and Natural Resources, and Malacañang Chief of Staff. He was also appointed to positions at Ninoy Aquino International Airport and the Philippine National Railways.

In 2019, he was elected again to the House of Representatives as the representative of the Anakalusugan party-list. He was among the 70 representatives who voted against the renewal of the ABS-CBN franchise. During the COVID-19 pandemic, he promoted and distributed the antiparasitic drug ivermectin as a possible prophylaxis and treatment for COVID-19, despite the lack of scientific evidence supporting its efficacy. In 2026, he and 18 other individuals drew controversy over their claims that kickbacks from flood control projects were being sent to several politicians and activists. Defensor unsuccessfully ran for senator in 2007 and for Mayor of Quezon City in 2010 and 2022.

Defensor was arrested on July 6, 2026, after the Sandiganbayan charged him with plunder and issued an arrest warrant in connection with an undeclared ₱75 million donation that he and two others allegedly made to Senator Rodante Marcoleta during the 2025 election campaign. He is currently awaiting trial.

== Early life and education ==
Mike Defensor was born on June 30, 1969 to lawyer Matias Defensor Jr. and Florence Pamintuan Tan Defensor. Matias Jr. was a prominent lawyer during the administration of President Ferdinand Marcos, being friends with former cabinet member Francisco Tatad and serving as spokesman during Marcos' presidential campaign in the 1986 snap election that preceded the People Power Revolution. Mike's younger sister, Maria Theresa ("Maite"), is a businesswoman and former politician.

He finished his elementary education and received both his Bachelor of Arts in History and Masters in Public Administration at the University of the Philippines Diliman, where he became a member of the UP Alpha Sigma. From 1988 to 1989, he was vice chairman of the UP Diliman University Student Council, serving alongside chairman Bong Bongolan. He finished his secondary education at Niles McKinley High School in Niles, Ohio.

== Political career ==
=== Quezon City councilor ===
Defensor was elected as a Quezon City councilor from the third district in the 1992 elections at the age of 23, making him the youngest member of that body. He received the Manuel Quezon Bantayog Award for Most Outstanding QC Councilor for the year 1994.

=== Congressman ===
Defensor ran for congressman of the third district of Quezon City against reelectionist Dennis Roldan in the 1995 election, which he subsequently won, becoming at age 26 the youngest member of the Philippine House of Representatives at the time. Though he ran under the party of Laban ng Demokratikong Pilipino, he switched to the Liberal Party in June 1995, a month before the 10th Congress convened. He won reelection in 1998.

==== Estrada impeachment ====
Defensor was part of the Spice Boys group of congressmen that spearheaded the filing of the impeachment case against then-President Joseph Estrada at the House of Representatives.

=== Arroyo cabinet ===
After the Second EDSA Revolution ousted President Estrada in January 2001, Defensor was appointed as Secretary of the Housing and Urban Development Coordinating Council by President Gloria Macapagal Arroyo, vacating his congressional seat five months before the end of his second term. He held that post until August 2004, when he was appointed Secretary of the Department of Environment and Natural Resources.

In the 2004 presidential election, he served as the official campaign spokesperson of President Arroyo, who would win the presidency to secure a full term. After his tenure as DENR Secretary, he was appointed Presidential Chief of Staff. He resigned from that post on February 10, 2007, to run for senator.

In June 2008, he was appointed head of Ninoy Aquino International Airport Terminal 3 (NAIA-3) by virtue of Executive Order No. 732 (creating the Presidential Task Force on the NAIA-3 that was "mandated to ensure the immediate opening and operation of Terminal III.") The order provides for the airport terminal's opening based on decisions of the Supreme Court and applicable laws.

On October 9, 2008, Defensor was named acting chairman of the Philippine National Railways (PNR).

=== Senate candidacy ===
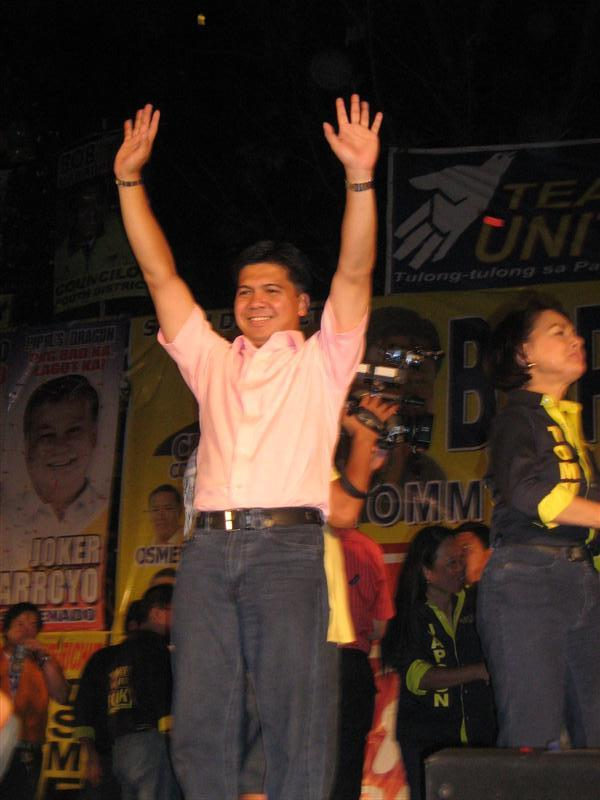
Defensor in 2007

Defensor was among the first to file for candidacy for the Senate on February 12, 2007. Prior to filing, one of his campaign proposals was to temporarily release deposed former president Joseph Estrada from his arrest while his trial at the Sandiganbayan was ongoing, prompting criticism from prosecutors at the trial who called it a "politician's gimmick". He employed popular gossip show host Boy Abunda as his campaign manager. He was named to the TEAM Unity coalition backed by the Arroyo administration. However, he lost the race, placing 15th overall out of the 12 seats.

=== Quezon City mayoral candidacy ===
In 2010, Defensor ran for Mayor of Quezon City under the People's Reform Party (PRP). However, he lost to outgoing Vice Mayor Herbert Bautista, who won via landslide.

In 2022, Defensor ran for Mayor of Quezon City under the Partido Federal ng Pilipinas (PFP). During his campaign, he wore the color red in openly expressing his support for the UniTeam candidacies of former senator Bongbong Marcos and Davao City Mayor Sara Duterte for the presidency and vice presidency respectively; both Marcos and Duterte ultimately won the national election. Defensor lost to incumbent Mayor Joy Belmonte, who emerged victorious in the local election.

=== Representative for Anakalusugan ===
==== Denial of the franchise renewal of ABS-CBN ====
Defensor is one of the vocal opponents against the franchise renewal of ABS-CBN, together with Sagip Party-list Rep. Rodante Marcoleta and Cavite 7th District Rep. Jesus Crispin Remulla. He is one of the 70 congressmen who voted "yes" to "kill" (deny) the franchise renewal of ABS-CBN, in favor of the report from the Technical Working Group. After claiming continuous victory, Defensor inititiated an online forum via Zoom and streamed live on Facebook along with Marcoleta, Remulla, Yedda Romualdez, Journalie Payonan, Dan Fernandez, Jose Antonio Sy-Alvarado, Inno Dy and Alfred delos Santos to discuss the fate of ABS-CBN. On July 18, 2020, they discussed the potential takeover of the ill-fated network due to alleged tampered torrens title, fine for the alleged illegal sale of ABS-CBN TV Plus for almost ₱2 trillion, and the total closure of Sky Cable as suggested by Camarines Sur 2nd District Rep. LRay Villafuerte. Meanwhile, pro-ABS-CBN advocate Christine Bersola-Babao slammed the forum and called the congresspersons as "evil", and Senate President Tito Sotto slammed the possible takeover of ABS-CBN by calling the compound as constitutionally protected.

==== BTS sa Kongreso ====
In January 2021, Defensor is announced to be part of the new bloc "BTS sa Kongreso" (named after the K-pop boy band group BTS of South Korea), a coalition group formed by Taguig–Pateros 1st district Rep. Alan Peter Cayetano of the House of Representatives of 18th Congress.

==== Ivermectin pantry ====
In April 2021, Defensor and SAGIP party-list representative Rodante Marcoleta initiated an "ivermectin pan-three" that distributes the anti-parasitic drug ivermectin, despite warnings from the World Health Organization on the lack of evidence to support ivermectin's efficacy against COVID-19.

== Controversies ==
=== Ador Mawanay fiasco ===
In August 2001, Defensor spearheaded the presentation of Antonio Luis Marquez (alias Ador Mawanay) to the public, positioning the whistleblower as a witness against the alleged criminal activities of newly elected Senator Panfilo Lacson. Acting as a primary defender of the Arroyo administration, Defensor championed Mawanay’s testimonies until Mawanay recanted his statements and claimed that he was coerced.

=== Vagrancy accusation ===
In 2001, Defensor faced allegations of hiring women for sex following the arrest of four individuals for vagrancy in Quezon City. He denied the claims, accusing the Quezon City Police of using a fabricated witness to falsely link him to the controversy.

=== Involvement in ZTE-NBN corruption scandal ===
Mike Defensor, on July 4, 2008, filed perjury lawsuit versus Rodolfo Noel Lozada for testifying under oath that he had paid Lozada ₱50,000 (equivalent to ₱75,233 in 2021) to change his statement that he was not kidnapped at Ninoy Aquino International Airport (NAIA) when he arrived from Hong Kong at the height of the NBN–ZTE deal corruption scandal.

=== Criticism vs. Bongbong Marcos ===
Since 2025, Defensor emerged as a critic to the administration of his former ally, President Bongbong Marcos, leading high-profile legal and political challenges, citing systemic corruption and governance failures. He had publicly called for Marcos's resignation and joined United People's Initiative (UPI) rallies. In January 2026, he led a group of complainants in filing impeachment case against Marcos, but withdrew the document after the office of the House Secretary General declined to accept it.

=== Flood control scandal and maleta allegations ===
In February 2026, he was involved in the "Marines Controversy," providing logistics, including a vehicle registered to his wife Julie, for 18 individuals identifying as former Marines. The group alleged they had delivered over ₱800 billion in kickbacks contained in suitcases (maleta in Filipino) to government officials. Malacañang dismissed the claims as a "destabilization plot," while the Philippine Navy reported that several witnesses were either never enlisted or had been dishonorably discharged.

On July 8, 2026, Senator Erwin Tulfo filed grave oral defamation complaints with the Mandaluyong City Prosecutor's Office against Defensor, two of Zaldy Co's former bodyguards, their lawyer Levito Baligod, Quezon City Councilor Ranulfo Ludovica, and lawyer Virgilio Garcia. The complaints stemmed from an event at the Doublegem EDSA Garden Events Place in Mandaluyong on June 16, 2026, which, after being cancelled as a Senate Blue Ribbon Committee hearing because no senators attended, proceeded as a press conference where the two ex-bodyguards accused Tulfo of receiving cash kickbacks from an alleged flood control scam. Tulfo, who served as the committee's chairperson under a rival Senate faction, denied the accusations and alleged that Defensor and Baligod spearheaded the event, citing his lack of jurisdiction over infrastructure projects.

=== Human trafficking complaints ===
In April 2026, Defensor became a central figure in a high-profile human trafficking investigation following a raid by the National Bureau of Investigation (NBI) on the Chicago Family KTV and Bleu Hotel in Pasig. On April 21, authorities rescued 54 women from an alleged "sex-for-hire" operation, leading the NBI to file complaints against Defensor, his wife Julie, and their child Miguel (who is a trans woman) as the registered owners of Cliffpoint Development Corporation, which handles the property. Defensor declined to comment on the trafficking complaints against his wife and child, stating he was following the advice of their legal counsel to remain silent since he was not personally named in that specific case. On June 26, 2026, the NBI filed qualified human trafficking cases against Defensor and his wife anew before the Pasig City Prosecutor’s Office.

=== Rodante Marcoleta campaign donation controversy ===
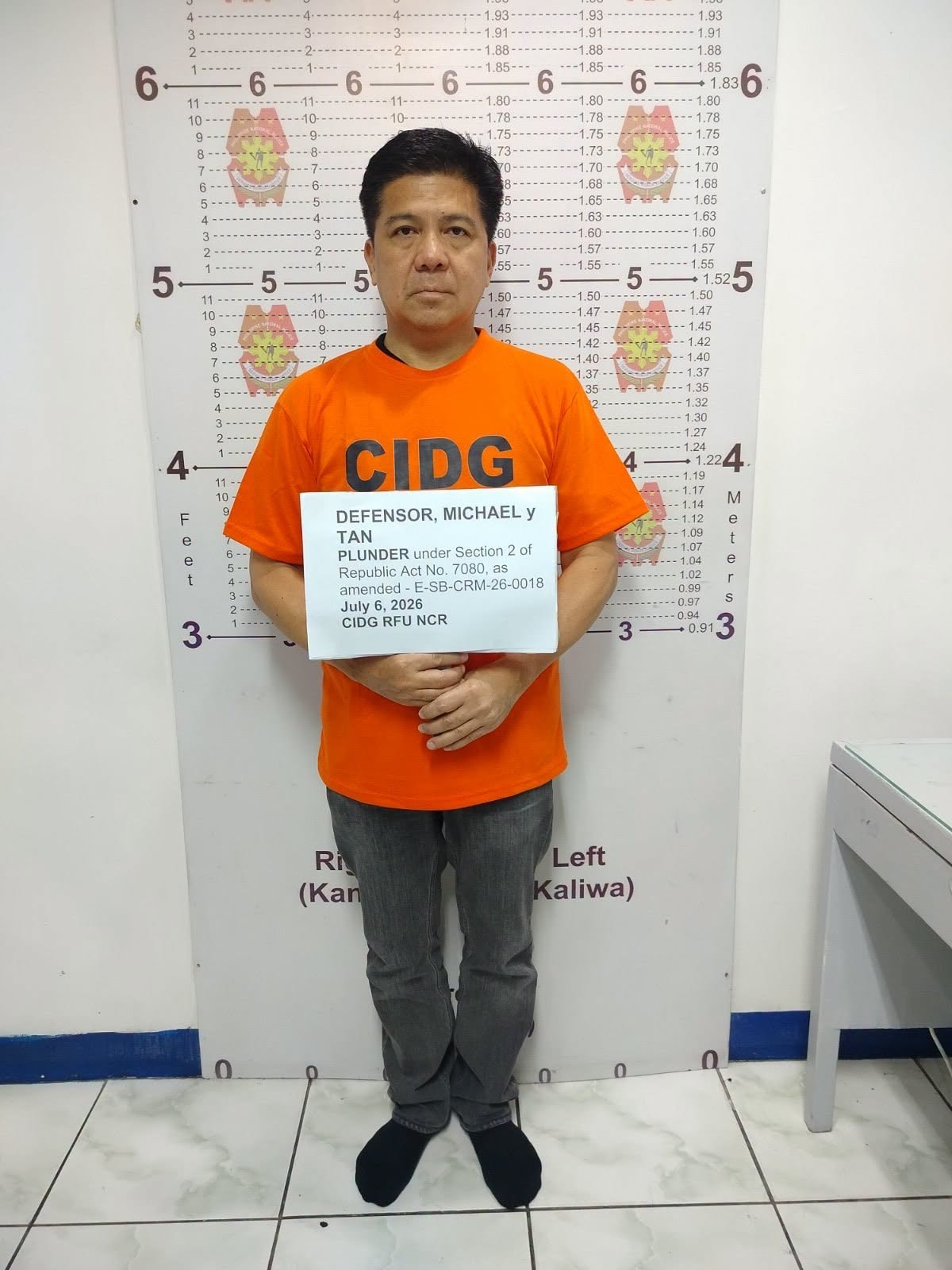
Mug shot of Defensor after his arrest by the Philippine National Police on July 6, 2026.

In May 2026, the Office of the Deputy Ombudsman's field investigation bureau for Luzon filed plunder and indirect bribery complaints against Senator Rodante Marcoleta and three of his 2025 senatorial campaign donors that includes Defensor. The complaint alleged that in January 2025, Defensor contributed ₱30 million to Marcoleta's campaign, which combined with contributions from two other donors for a total of ₱75 million—above the ₱50 million statutory threshold for plunder and allegedly left undeclared in Marcoleta's Statement of Assets, Liabilities, and Net Worth (SALN).

On July 6, 2026, Defensor, alongside Marcoleta and two other campaign donors, was arrested by the Philippine National Police on non-bailable charges of plunder. He is detained at the New Quezon City Jail in Payatas. On July 8, another warrant of arrest was issued against Defensor and Marcoleta over the alleged violation of Presidential Decree No. 46 that bans the exchange of gifts between public officials and private individuals.

== Laws authored ==
- RA 8313, An Act upgrading the Quirino Memorial Medical Center
- RA 8976, An Act Requiring the Fortification of Processed Foods with Essential Micronutrients
- An Act Creating the Department of Housing and Urban Development (co-author)
- Dangerous Drugs Act of 1998 (co-author)
- Act Amending the Magna Carta of the Disabled Persons (co-author)
- Act Mandating the Nationwide Rabies Vaccination Program (co-author)
- Technical Working Group (TWG) report recommending the denial of ABS-CBN's franchise application (co-author)

== Other positions held ==
- Former vice-chair, House of Representatives’ Committee on Legislative Franchises
- Chief executive officer, Pax Libera Mining
- Chair, NiHAO Mineral Resources Inc. (mining company)
- Chair, Geograce Resources Philippines (mining company)
- Chairperson, Kabataang Liberal ng Pilipinas
- Chairperson, National Movement of Young Legislators
- Chairperson, National Union of Students in the Philippines
- Lord Chancellor, Alpha Sigma Fraternity
- Program director, Youth Council of the Philippines

=== Director, Petron Corporation ===
On December 4, 2007, Mike Defensor quietly joined to the board of directors of Petron Corporation with former budget secretary Emilia Boncodin. Defensor had been frequenting Macau. Boncodin stated that Defensor was invited to the board by Nicasio Alcantara, government's team head / Chair, Petron. Membership in the Petron board is a lucrative job, as Defensor was offered a board seat in sequestered United Coconut Planters Bank. Defeated administration candidate, former senator Ralph Recto joined the board of UnionBank, controlled by the Aboitiz family.

== Electoral history ==
Electoral history of Mike Defensor
Year	Office	Party	Votes received				Result
Year	Office	Party	Total	%	P.	Swing	Result
1995	Representative (Quezon City–3rd)	LDP	29,663	30.29	1st	—N/a	Won
1998	Representative (Quezon City–3rd)	Liberal	43,970	38.90	1st	—N/a	Won
2007	Senator of the Philippines	Lakas	9,938,995	33.69	15th	—N/a	Lost
2019	Representative (Party-list)	Anakalusugan	237,629	0.85	38th	—N/a	Won
2010	Mayor of Quezon City	PRP	126,847	17.87	2nd	—N/a	Lost
2022	Mayor of Quezon City	PFP	419,064	38.22	2nd	—N/a	Lost

== Personal life ==
Defensor is married to Julie Rose Tactacan, with whom he has five children. Their eldest daughter, Michaela (Mikee), is a lawyer who is a member of the Philippine Anti-Dynasty Network.

== See also ==
- ABS-CBN franchise renewal controversy
- National Telecommunications Commission (Philippines)

== Notes ==
Government offices
Preceded by Rigoberto Tiglao	Malacañang Chief of Staff; 2006–2007	Succeeded by Joey Salceda
Preceded by Elisea G. Gozun	Secretary of Environment and Natural Resources; 2004–2006	Succeeded by Angelo Reyes
Preceded by Karina Constantino David	Chairman of the Housing and Urban Development Coordinating Council; 2001–2004	Succeeded by Noli de Castro
House of Representatives of the Philippines
Preceded by Dennis Roldan	Member of the House of Representatives from Quezon City's 3rd district 1995–2001	Succeeded by Maria Theresa Defensor
