= Brat Pack (House of Representatives of the Philippines) =

Group of young congressmen attempted on impeaching Chief Justice Hilario Davide

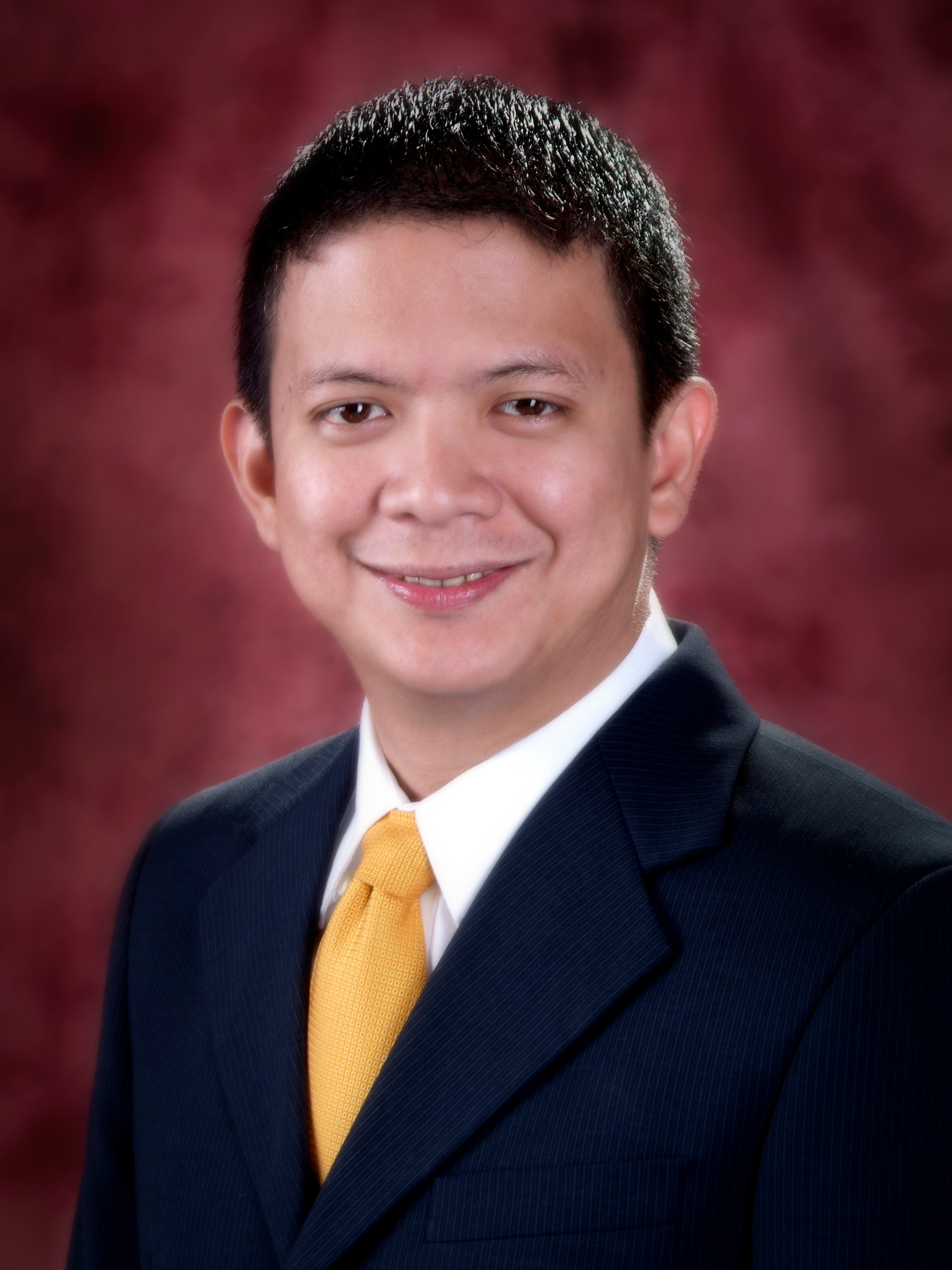
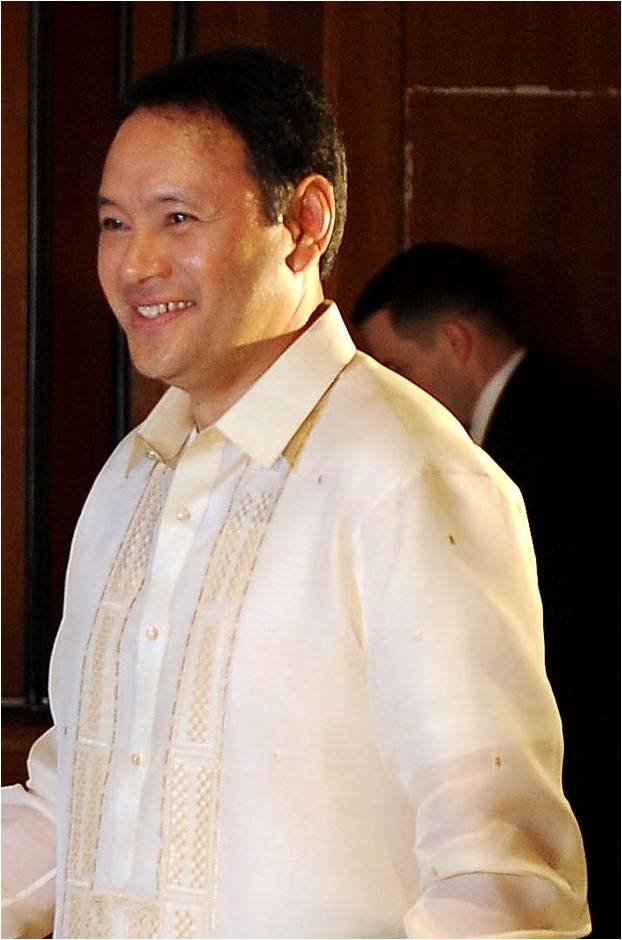
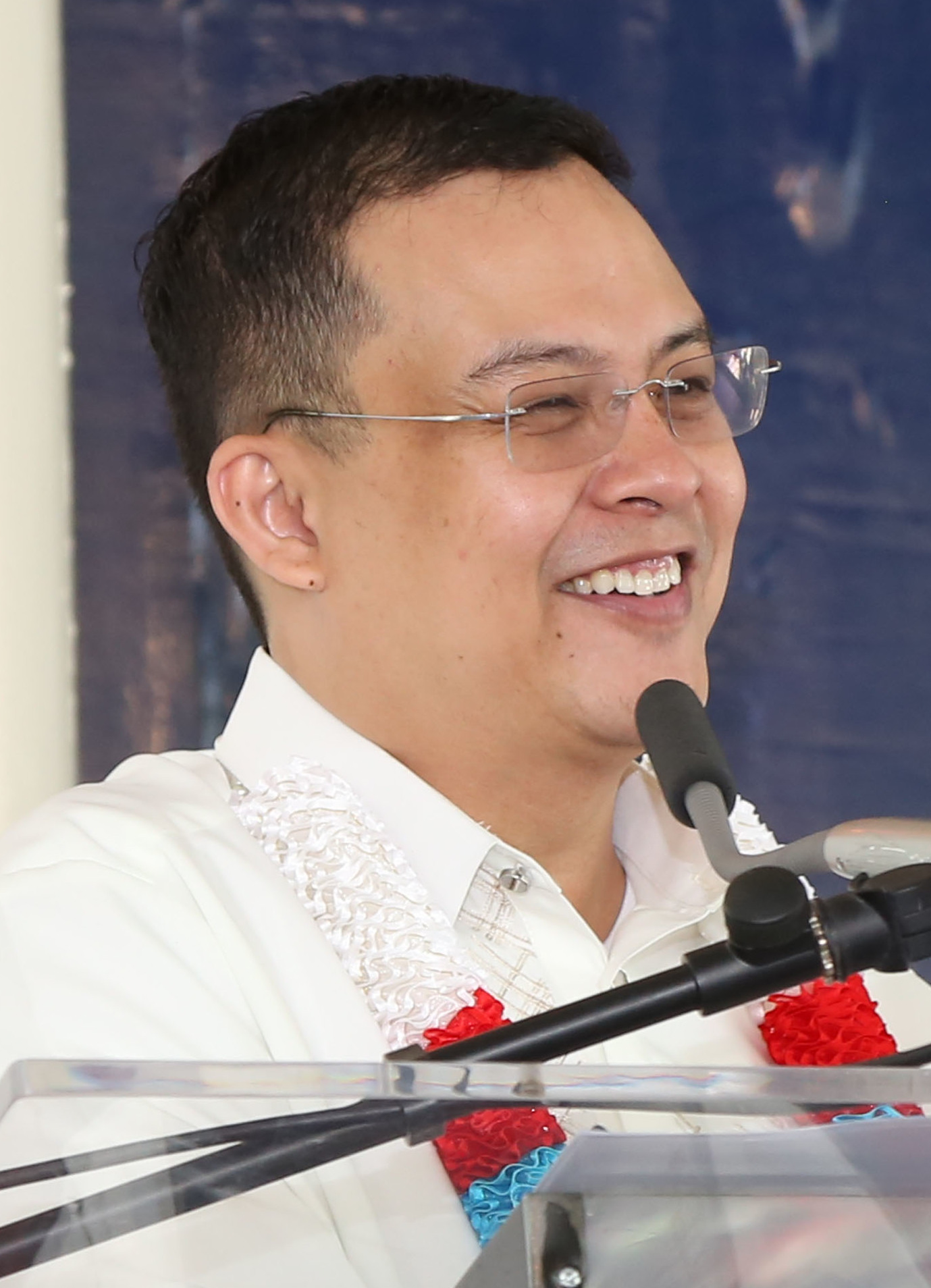
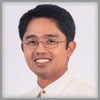
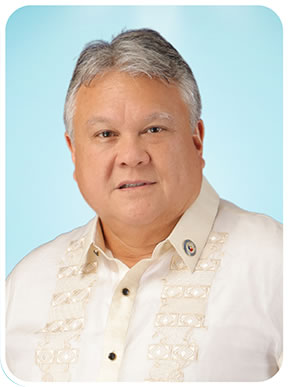
The Brat Pack

The Brat Pack were seven neophyte and two-term congressmen of the Philippine House of Representatives openly critical and attempted to impeach the then-Chief Justice Hilario Davide Jr. for misusing its Judiciary Development Funds (JDF). The group's name is an allusion to the same nickname, which known for young actors who frequently appeared together in teen-oriented coming-of-age films in the 1980s.

== Background ==
Six young congressmen from the Nationalist People's Coalition (NPC) led by Francis "Chiz" Escudero, and NPC founder's nephew Gilbert Teodoro, with the inclusion of Gilbert Remulla from Laban ng Demokratikong Pilipino (LDP) filed an impeachment complaint against Chief Justice Hilario Davide Jr. for misusing Php 4-billion Judiciary Development Fund (JDF) by spending it within his orders for purchase luxury cars, vacation houses and furnishings in the Supreme Court justices' office, instead of using for allowances of employees. By October 2003, they claimed that they have 87 signatories for impeachment complaint to be successful. But, House officials did not transmit the complaint to the Senate, and the earlier complaint they filed declared by the Supreme Court unconstitutional. Also, the impeachment complaint in the House was shut down by 115 congressmen in November of the same year.

However, the Brat Pack was closely associated with the NPC, which was founded by business tycoon Danding Cojuangco, who was accused by some editorials of pushing for the impeachment.

== Composition ==
The faction consisted of:

1. Felix William Fuentebella (NPC) – 3rd district of Camarines Sur
2. Francis "Chiz" Escudero (NPC) – 1st district of Sorsogon
3. Gilbert Remulla (LDP) – 2nd district of Cavite
4. Gilbert Teodoro (NPC) – 1st district of Tarlac
5. Marcos "Mark" Cojuangco (NPC) – 5th district of Pangasinan
6. Carlos "Charlie" Cojuangco (NPC) – 4th district of Negros Occidental
7. Michael John "Jack" Duavit (NPC) – 1st district of Rizal

== See also ==
- Bright Boys, a clique of Filipino congressmen which Escudero and Teodoro is also members
