= Bright Boys =

Group of young congressmen who supports Joseph Estrada in 1998 to 2001

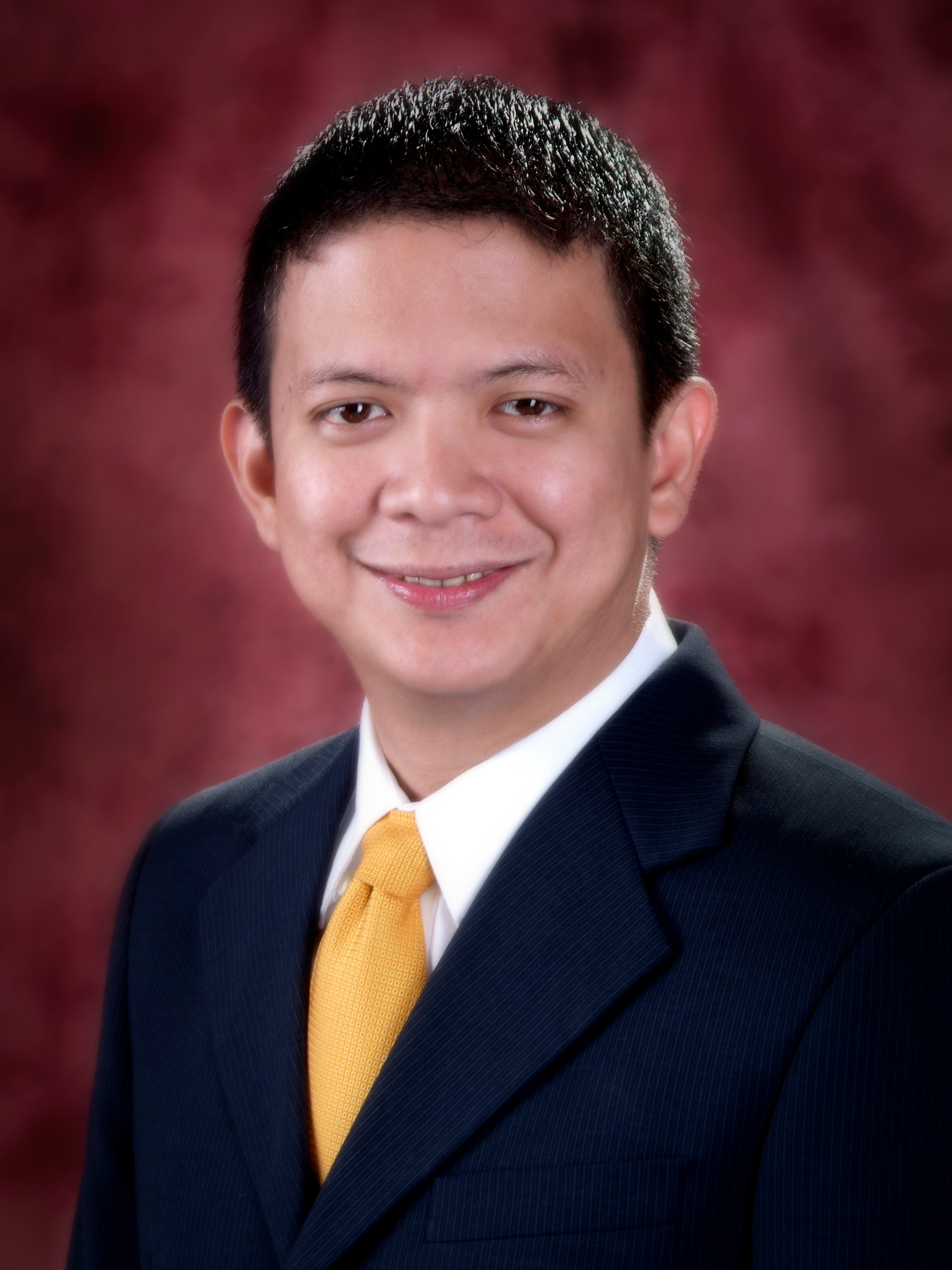
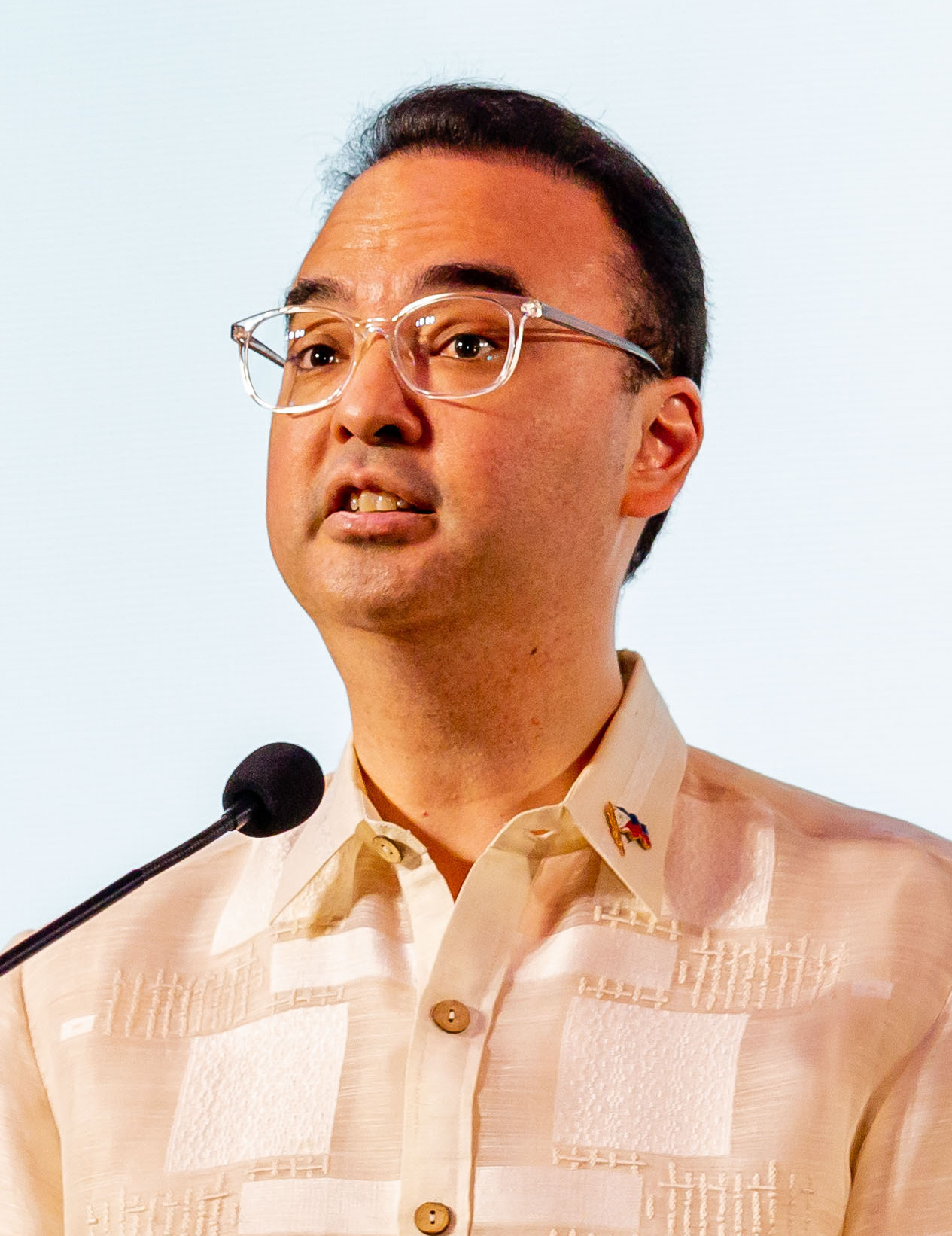
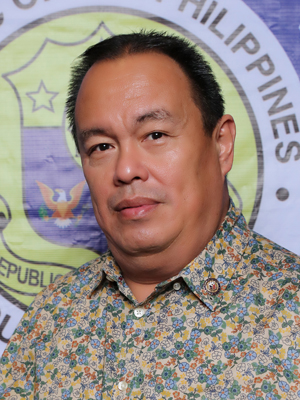
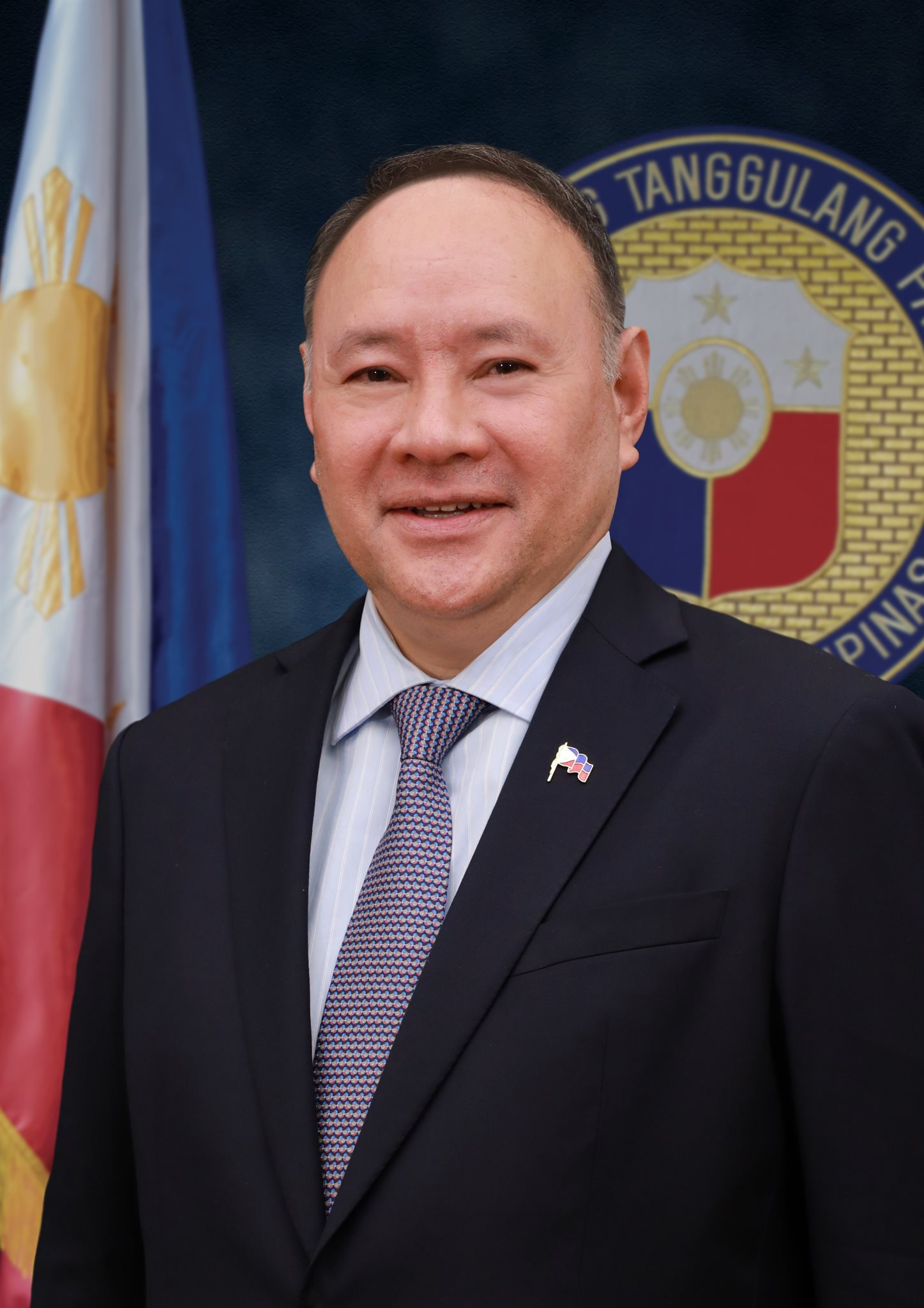
The Bright Boys

The Bright Boys were seven first-term administration congressmen of the House of Representatives of the Philippines who were dubbed as such by Joseph Estrada during his term as President of the Philippines.

== Background ==
The 1998 Philippine general election ushered in a wave of neophyte congressmen into the House of Representatives, filling 140 seats of the 220-seat Lower House. About a fifth of its members were under 40 years of age, roughly equivalent to Generation X. This influx of young blood changed the way legislative business was undertaken and the image of the Filipino politician, most of whom were derided as trapos or "TRAditional POliticians". Incidentally, the Spanish word trapo means "rag", as in a dish rag.

The name "Bright Boys" was coined by Estrada during a social call on the then-President by the group. Rodolfo Albano III, the group's elder, commented that the six other young congressmen he was with were a smart clique. This led to Estrada calling them the "Bright Boys", as he thought they had a bright future in congress. It was also an allusion to a similar clique in the opposition, the Spice Boys.

== Composition ==
The group consisted of:

1. Rodolfo Albano III (Lakas) – Isabela
2. Alan Peter Cayetano (LAMMP) – Pateros-Taguig
3. Joseph Ace Durano (NPC) – Cebu
4. Francis Escudero (NPC) – Sorsogon
5. Edmundo Reyes, Jr. (LAMMP) – Marinduque
6. Jurdin Jesus Romualdo (LAMMP) – Camiguin
7. Gilberto Teodoro, Jr. (NPC) – Tarlac

== See also ==
- 11th Congress of the Philippines
- Brat Pack (House of Representatives of the Philippines), another group of young congressmen group in 2002–2003 which Francis Escudero and Gilbert Teodoro are also included
