= Presidential Chief of Staff =

Administrative leader of the Philippines

- Appointer: President of the Philippines
- Term length: No fixed term
- Formation: February 16, 2000
- First holder: Aprodicio Laquian
- Final holder: Joey Salceda
- Abolished: February 26, 2008

The Malacañang Chief of Staff, named after Malacañang Palace, the official residence of the president of the Philippines, also referred to as the "presidential chief of staff," was an official position under the Office of the President of the Philippines. President Joseph Estrada created the position in February 16, 2000, but described it as only being a "temporary" position. However, this position was carried over to the administration of his successor, President Gloria Macapagal Arroyo, before being abolished in February 26, 2008.

== Powers and functions ==
Under the Administration of Presidents Estrada and Arroyo, the Office of the Presidential Chief of Staff held the schedule of the President in coordination with the Cabinet officer for presidential engagements, as well as supervise the President's activities and engagements. The chief of staff post also "controlled access to the President," and "provide good, wise, and honest counsel" to the country's top leader, based on AO No. 138, series of 2006. Aside from these, the Palace chief of staff reviews the documents intended for the President, advocates for their strategic policies and programs, and builds bridges with "critical stakeholders" that include the Cabinet, judiciary, and lobbyists. The official also guard[s] the President’s interests and Protect the President from forces that could destroy the Administration. Upon the Abolishment of the office and the position, all Powers and Functions are transferred to the Office of the Executive Secretary.

== List ==
Portrait	Name	Term Began	Term Ended	President
	Aprodicio Laquian	February 16, 2000	March 28, 2000	Joseph Ejercito Estrada
	Renato Corona	January 20, 2001	April 9, 2002	Gloria Macapagal Arroyo
	Rigoberto Tiglao	April 9, 2002	2004	Gloria Macapagal Arroyo
	Norberto Gonzales	2004	2005	Gloria Macapagal Arroyo
	Mike Defensor	February 15, 2006	February 10, 2007	Gloria Macapagal Arroyo
	Joey Salceda	February 10, 2007	March 29, 2007	Gloria Macapagal Arroyo

== Other chiefs of staff ==
Other political positions have chiefs of staff, the vice president's office under Leni Robredo and Sara Duterte and all other Key Departments of the Government.
