= Joey Salceda =

Filipino politician and economist (born 1961)

- Official portrait, 2026

Secretary of the Presidential Legislative Liaison Office
- Incumbent
- Assumed office July 20, 2026
- President: Bongbong Marcos
- Preceded by: Usec. Bernardino E. Sayo (OIC)

Member of the Philippine House of Representatives from Albay
- In office June 30, 2016 – June 30, 2025
- Preceded by: Al Francis Bichara
- Succeeded by: Caloy Loria
- Constituency: 2nd district
- In office June 30, 1998 – February 10, 2007
- Preceded by: Romeo Salalima
- Succeeded by: Vacant; Post later held by Reno G. Lim
- Constituency: 3rd district

26th Governor of Albay
- In office June 30, 2007 – June 30, 2016
- Vice Governor: Brando Sael (2007–2010); Harold Imperial (2010–2016)
- Preceded by: Fernando V. Gonzalez
- Succeeded by: Al Francis Bichara

Malacañang Chief of Staff
- In office February 10, 2007 – March 29, 2007
- President: Gloria Macapagal Arroyo
- Preceded by: Mike Defensor
- Succeeded by: Position abolished

Personal details
- Born: Jose Ma. Clemente Sarte Salceda; October 26, 1961 (age 64) Polangui, Albay, Philippines
- Party: Lakas (2001–2007; 2008–2009; 2022–present)
- Other political affiliations: PDP–Laban (2016–2022); Liberal (2009–2016); KAMPI (2007–2008); Independent (2007); LAMMP (1998–2001)
- Education: Ateneo de Manila University (BS); Asian Institute of Management (MBA)
- Occupation: Politician
- Profession: Economist

Jose Ma. Clemente "Joey" Sarte Salceda (Tagalog pronunciation: [sɐlˈseda], born October 26, 1961) is a Filipino politician and economist who currently serves as Secretary of the Presidential Legislative Liaison Office under the cabinet of President Bongbong Marcos.

Salceda previously served as Representative of Albay's 2nd District in the Philippine House of Representatives from 2016 to 2025. He previously served as governor of Albay province in the Philippines for three terms. Prior to that, he was a three-year term representative of the Third District of Albay and was appointed as Presidential Chief of Staff on February 10, 2007, after the resignation of Michael Defensor, before he himself resigned on March 29, 2007, to pursue his gubernatorial bid in his province.

Salceda was also the longest-serving chairman of the powerful House Committee on Ways and Means from 2019 to 2025.

Salceda is the principal author of the Tax Reform for Acceleration and Inclusion Law, the Corporate Recovery and Tax Incentives for Enterprises (CREATE) Law, which reduced corporate income taxes in the Philippines to 20%, and the Free College Tuition Law.

He was also the principal author of the New Agrarian Emancipation Act.

== Early life and education ==
Joey Salceda is the son of former Polangui, Albay Mayor Jesus Salceda, Sr. Salceda graduated cum laude with a Bachelor of Science in Management Engineering from the Ateneo de Manila University in 1982 (1981 in some sources) and received his master's degree in Business Management at the Asian Institute of Management. At the Ateneo de Manila University, former President Gloria Macapagal Arroyo was his economics professor, and another former president, Benigno Aquino III, was his classmate.

== Career ==
Before joining the legislature, Salceda was the Research Director of UBS Warburg (a division of Swiss Bank Corporation). While with UBS, he was voted among the top five analysts in a 1996 survey of Philippine fund managers. He also served as Research Director of Barings Securities Phils. (now ING Group) for five years. During his term, the Barings research team was voted number one in 12 international surveys of fund managers. He also garnered several awards for his distinguished performance in the field of financial markets research. He was voted by foreign fund managers in Asiamoney's Annual Survey as "Best Analyst" in 1995 and "Best Economist" for four consecutive years from 1993 to 1996.

Prior to his career in the private sector, Salceda was also Congressional Fellow to Speaker Ramon Mitra Jr. and chief of staff to Senator Raul Roco.

=== Representative of the 3rd district of Albay (1998-2007) ===
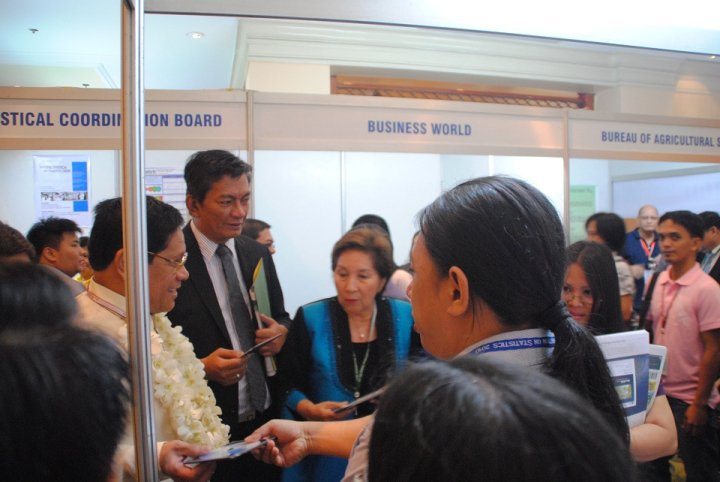
Salceda was joined by TV personality Solita Monsod at a conference on statistics in 2010.

In his freshman term, Salceda was elected chairman of the House Committee on Trade and Industry. During his chairmanship, he led the enactment three key trade measures, namely Republic Act No. 8751 or the Countervailing Duty Act, Republic Act No. 8752 or the Anti-Dumping Duty Act, and Republic Act No. 8800 or the Safeguard Measures Act. As congressman, Salceda opposed capital punishment, with him filing a bill that sought to repeal it from law.

He sponsored the conversion of the municipality of Ligao into a component city under Republic Act No. 9008, as he was the incumbent Albay 3rd District Congressman at that time.

In recognition of his experience in the markets, he held several key positions during his freshman term, including as Chairman of the Committee on Trade and Industry and vice chair of the Committees on Ways and Means and Economic Affairs.

Salceda was also instrumental in initiating the Bicol International Airport, which he requested from President Arroyo in 2004.

=== Governor of Albay (2007-2016) ===
After resigning from the Arroyo Cabinet in 2007, Salceda ran for Governor of Albay and was subsequently elected, defeating incumbent Fernando V. Gonzalez. His three terms as governor were best known for his establishment of the zero-casualty doctrine in disaster preparedness for which he earned international recognition as a Senior Global Champion for disaster risk reduction by the United Nations as well as his climate change advocacy, which eventually led to him being elected as the first Asian co-chair of the United Nations Green Climate Fund in 2013. Salceda also received numerous awards in disaster resilience, good governance, education, health, and tourism.

Salceda also worked for economic and tourism development across the Bicol region as Chair of the Regional Development Council (RDC) of Bicol for three consecutive terms. As RDC Chairman, Salceda established the AlMaSor regional tourism alliance, with Albay, Masbate, and Sorsogon as its constituent provinces. Salceda was also instrumental in the establishment of the Bicol University College of Medicine.

=== Representative of the 2nd district of Albay (2016-2025) ===
After three terms as Governor, Salceda returned to Congress as Representative of the 2nd district of Albay in 2016, where he is credited for articulating the economic strategy "Dutertenomics" as well as for championing the Tax Reform for Acceleration and Inclusion or TRAIN law.

==== "Father of the Free College Tuition Law" ====
Salceda, as principal author and the first to file a House version in the 17th Congress, also defended the Free College Tuition law from its critics in Cabinet, who sought its veto. The law was patterned after Salceda's aggressive college assistance program called Albay Higher Education Contribution Scheme (AHECS), which Senate sponsor Bam Aquino credited as the "model that [congressmen] were trying to espouse in Congress," adding that Salceda, as governor, "was able to drop the poverty incidence rate." For this, he was awarded a citation by the Commission on Higher Education, which called him the "Father of the Free College Tuition Law."

==== Chairman of the Ways and Means Committee ====
In his second term, Salceda was elected chairman of the House Committee on Ways and Means, and was reelected to head the committee in 2022.

As committee chairman, Salceda led the enactment of the Comprehensive Tax Reform Program, which was an overhaul of the National Internal Revenue Code. This included the lowering of personal and corporate income taxes, the reduction in donor's and estate taxes, the cut in the stock transaction tax, and the introduction of higher excise taxes on alcohol, tobacco, and vapor products.

==== "Senior Citizens' Champion" ====
Salceda also championed the expansion of Senior Citizen benefits. Salceda sponsored measures to enhance the welfare of senior citizens, including House Bill 10312, which expands the 20% senior citizen discount and VAT exemption to digital and online transactions; House Bill 10313, which mandates pharmacies to automatically grant senior discounts even without IDs if age is visibly evident; and House Bill 10409, which requires power and water utilities to itemize senior citizen discounts in billing statements. He also pushed for automatic PhilHealth coverage for seniors, lifetime validity of their IDs, and simplified access to pensions and discounts (such as the removal of the booklet requirement in pharmacies), earning him recognition as the foremost congressional champion of senior citizens’ rights.

=== Secretary of the Presidential Legislative Liaison Office ===
In July 2026, President Bongbong Marcos appointed Salceda as head of the Presidential Legislative Liaison Office following its reorganization under Executive Order No. 90 succeeding the abolished position of Presidential Adviser on Legislative Affairs.
