= Noel Rosal =

Filipino politician (born 1964)

The Honorable Noel Ebriega Rosal
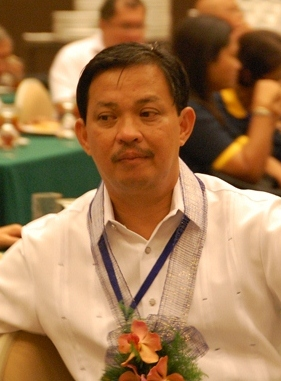
- Noel Rosal in September 2010

27th Governor of Albay
- Incumbent
- Assumed office June 30, 2025
- Vice Governor: Farida S. Co
- Preceded by: Glenda Ong Bongao
- In office June 30, 2022 – December 1, 2022
- Vice Governor: Edcel Greco Lagman
- Preceded by: Al Francis Bichara
- Succeeded by: Edcel Greco Lagman

First Gentleman of Legazpi
- In role June 30, 2022 – November 12, 2024
- Preceded by: Carmen Geraldine Rosal
- In role June 30, 2010 – June 30, 2013
- Succeeded by: Carmen Geraldine Rosal

Mayor of Legazpi
- In office June 30, 2013 – June 30, 2022
- Preceded by: Carmen Geraldine Rosal
- Succeeded by: Carmen Geraldine Rosal
- In office June 30, 2001 – June 30, 2010
- Preceded by: Imelda Meneses C. Roces
- Succeeded by: Carmen Geraldine Rosal

City Administrator of Legazpi
- In office June 30, 2010 – June 30, 2013
- Preceded by: Edmundo Aragon
- Succeeded by: Chito Ante

Personal details
- Born: Noel Ebriega Rosal; January 2, 1964 (age 62) Ermita, Manila, Philippines,
- Party: NUP (since 2025)
- Other political affiliations: PDP (2018–2021; 2024–2025); KANP (2021–2024); Liberal (2009–2018); Lakas (2004–2009); NPC (2001–2004)
- Spouse: Carmen Geraldine Barrameda–Rosal
- Children: 3
- Education: Adamson University; Aquinas University

Noel Ebriega Rosal (born January 2, 1964) is a Filipino businessman and politician. He served as governor of Albay in 2022 and is the incumbent governor of Albay from 2025 to 2028. He was mayor of Legazpi from 2001 to 2010 and again from 2013 to 2022.

== Personal life ==
Rosal is a graduate of Bachelor of Science in Industrial Engineering from Adamson University. He later took up master's degree in Business Administration and Bachelor of Laws at Aquinas University.

Rosal is married to Carmen Geraldine Barrameda, mayor of Legazpi City (2010–2013, 2022–2024). They have three children: Princess, Gerald Noel, and Gilian Noelle.

== Political career ==
=== Before 2001 ===
An industrial engineer, Rosal started his career in 1989 when he defeated the incumbent yet the longest-serving chieftain of Barangay Gogon in 20 years. He became a city councilor in 1990 and served for two terms.

=== As city mayor ===
In 2001, he was elected mayor of Legazpi City and served until 2010; and again in 2013, this time unopposed. He served as city administrator while his wife, Geraldine, was the mayor from 2010 to 2013.

Rosal received various awards and recognitions from known award-giving bodies for good governance, including those from the United Nations Educational, Scientific and Cultural Organization and the United States Agency for International Development. The city received recognitions as well.

During his tenure, Rosal enforced in the city an order from the Department of Environment and Natural Resources to the concerned local government units surrounding Mayon Volcano stopping all quarry operations following a landslide in Guinobatan during Super Typhoon Goni (Rolly) in 2020.

Rosal has been referred to as the "Jesse Robredo of Albay".

==== 2004 election protest against Rosal ====
Rosal's mayoralty opponent in the 2004 elections, former councilor Michael Victor Imperial, filed before the Commission on Elections a pre-proclamation protest against him contesting the results in several polling precincts, citing various irregularities.

In January 2006, following the recount, the COMELEC Second Division in its resolution proclaimed Imperial the duly elected city mayor and ordered Rosal to leave the mayor's office. The resolution was affirmed by the commission en banc in May 2006.

Rosal later brought the issue to the Supreme Court which issued the status quo ante order in June 2006 and, in March 2007, nullified all decisions by the COMELEC, allowing him to continue performing as mayor while the true results of the 2004 mayoral elections are being determined.

=== As provincial governor ===
In 2022, Rosal, ran under the political party Katipunan ng Nagkakaisang Pilipino, defeated incumbent Albay Governor Al Francis Bichara, garnering almost twice number of votes than the latter; thus the first governor from the province's second district after three decades. The vote margin he won is the largest in the history of the province's gubernatorial elections.

==== Disqualification case ====
On September 19, 2022, the COMELEC First Division granted the petition filed on April by Joseph Armogila, a defeated city council candidate, who asked for the disqualification of Rosal from the 2022 local elections for violating an election code provision on ban on public spending in his capacity as city mayor. On the same day, Rosal said in his statement that he would appeal the said ruling, citing that it is not yet final and executory.

The COMELEC en banc, in its unanimous resolution dated November 18, denied the motion for reconsideration filed by Rosal, upholding the disqualification, stating that they found no convincing reason for its reversal. On November 25, a certificate of finality was issued as there were no any order from the Supreme Court (SC) came within five days to halt the said decision. Rosal only filed a petition for temporary restraining order at the SC on the same day. Despite Rosal awaiting the decision, on November 29, the COMELEC, issuing a writ of execution, ordered him to relinquish and vacate his post as provincial governor; it became effective upon its enforcement two days later. The appeal is now pending before the SC.

Rosal was replaced by then provincial vice governor Grex Lagman. Rosal later showed his intention to reclaim the governorship from Lagman in the 2025 elections.

The Commission on Audit, through a decision dated July 31, 2024, upholding the regional office's 2023 notice of disallowance against Rosal and favoring with the COMELEC's position on illegal spending, ordered the Rosal couple and six other city government personnel to return government funds found to be illegally disbursed in 2022, amounting more than ₱60 million—including almost half that was subjected to an earlier COMELEC ruling against him.

==== Dismissal by the Ombudsman ====
The Ombudsman issued a resolution on August 29, 2024, which was made public a week later, dismissing Rosal from service and permanently barring him from holding any public office, after founding him guilty of grave misconduct and oppression in relation to his illegal reassignment of three government personnel. The ruling stated that he violated the rules of Civil Service Commission for such move that affected the provincial government's operations. Meanwhile, the decision, acted to a 2022 complaint against the Rosals, also ordered a one-year suspension of his wife, city mayor Geraldine, from service for a separate offense.

Despite his dismissal, Rosal filed his candidacy for governor in the 2025 Philippine general election on October 3, 2024. However, his disqualification for his 2022 election spending case, along with that of his wife Carmen in the mayoralty race in Legazpi, was upheld by the Supreme Court on October 22. On October 22, the court issued a temporary restraining order against the Commission on Elections's (COMELEC) Resolution which disqualified Rosal from running in the 2025 polls. On December 27, Rosal was finally disqualified by the COMELEC from running in the 2025 polls. The disqualification was again blocked by a temporary restraining order issued by the Supreme Court on January 21, 2025.

Political offices
Preceded by Glenda Bongao	Governor of Albay; 2025–present 2022	Incumbent
Preceded by Al Francis Bichara	Governor of Albay; 2025–present 2022	Succeeded by Edcel Greco Lagman
Preceded by Carmen Geraldine Rosal	Mayor of Legazpi City; 2013–2022	Succeeded by Carmen Geraldine Rosal
Preceded by Imelda Roces	Mayor of Legazpi City; 2001–2010	Succeeded by Carmen Geraldine Rosal
Preceded by Edmundo Aragon	City Administrator of Legazpi City; 2010-2013	Vacant
