= Hermon Lagman =

Philippine lawyer

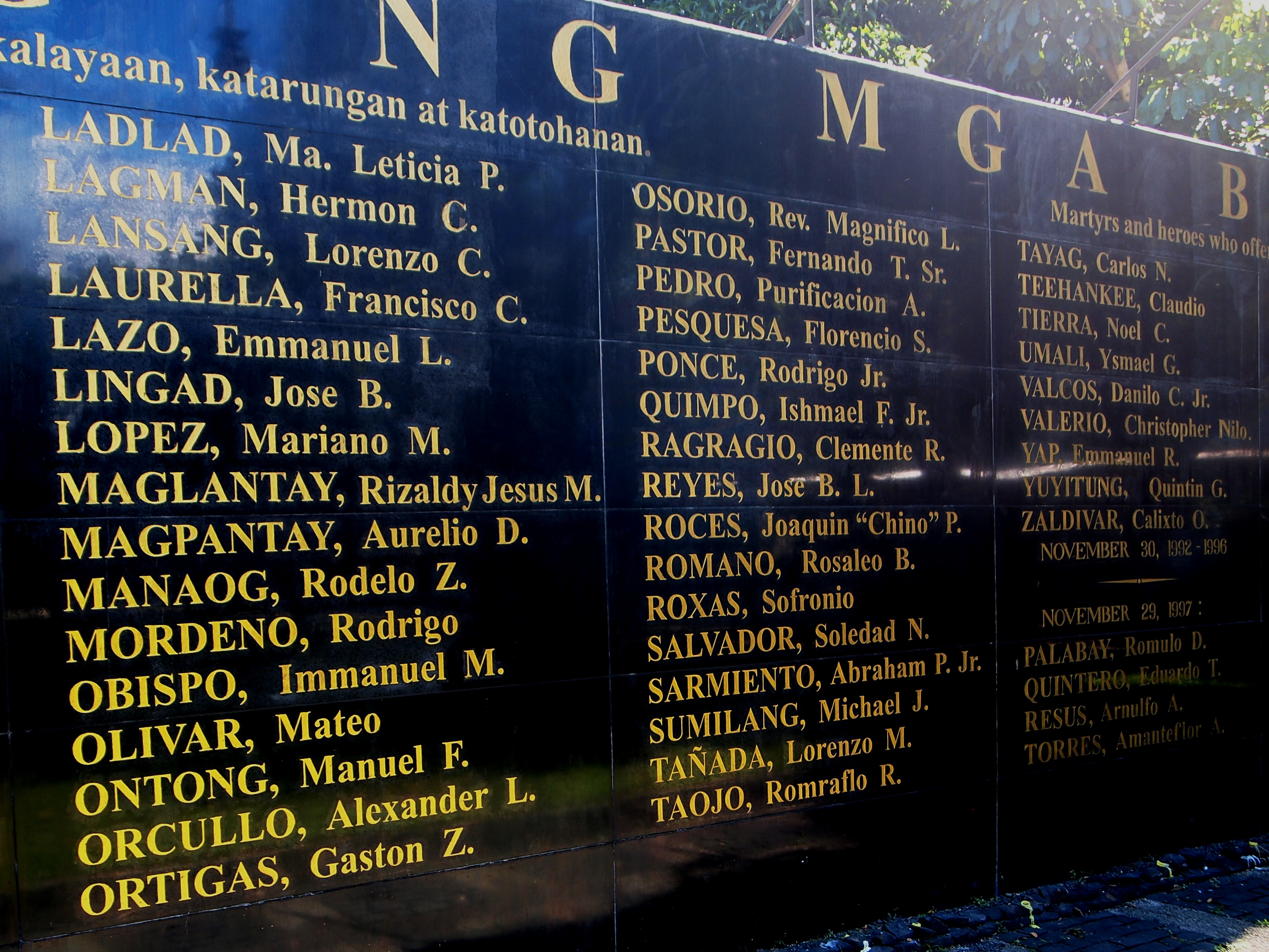
- Detail of the Wall of Remembrance at the Bantayog ng mga Bayani, showing names from the first batch of Bantayog Honorees, including that of Hermon Lagman.
- Born: February 12, 1945
- Disappeared: May 11, 1977 (aged 32)
- Education: University of the Philippines Diliman
- Occupation: Labor lawyer
- Relatives: Edcel Lagman (brother); Filemon Lagman (brother); Edcel Greco Lagman (nephew)

Hermon Castelar Lagman (February 12, 1945 – disappeared May 11, 1977) was a Filipino labor lawyer best known for his role in the Philippine labor sector's resistance against the dictatorship of Ferdinand Marcos, which resulted in his forced disappearance in 1977. In 1992, he was among the first batch of 65 Martial Law era martyrs to be honored by having their names engraved on the Wall of Remembrance at the Philippines Bantayog ng mga Bayani memorial.

== Education ==
Lagman took up an undergraduate degree and later studied law at the University of the Philippines Diliman, where he was senior editor of the Philippine Collegian and later became editor-in-chief of the Law Register, the official paper of the law students at the University of the Philippines. While in the university, he became a member of the Alpha Phi Beta Fraternity.

== Career ==
Upon passing the Philippine bar exams in 1971, Lagman immediately got into labor law, volunteering his services to the Citizens’ Legal Aid Society in the Philippines and eventually becoming a founding member of the Free Legal Assistance Group.

When President Ferdinand Marcos declared martial law in September 1972, Lagman was among the first to be arrested, and remained a political detainee for two months. He would later be briefly arrested again in 1976.

As a lawyer, Lagman is best remembered for being the legal counsel to many of the labor unions which spearheaded the 1975 La Tondeña Distillery strike, which was one of the first major open acts of resistance against the Marcos dictatorship and an important turning point for the period.

== Disappearance ==
Lagman was accompanied by his associate Victor Reyes while traveling from Quezon City to a meeting in Pasay City on May 11, 1977, when they disappeared. Efforts to find the two in Marcos' various detention centers and military camps produced no results, but Lagman's mother received anonymous call which informed her that the two had been abducted. After that, there was no further news about the location of Lagman or Reyes' bodies. The two are among the 640 individuals who remain missing after having disappeared during the Marcos regime.

== Family ==
Lagman was born Pedro Eduardo Diaz Lagman Jr., a teacher and prosecutor, and Cecilia Castelar, who was also a teacher. Hermon had five other siblings. On November 23, 1985, Cecilia and other families launched the Families of the Victims of Involuntary Disappearances (FIND) in order to locate victims of enforced disappearances.

He was the brother of Filemon "Popoy" Lagman, a labor leader who founded the Alex Boncayao Brigade communist guerrilla group in 1984 and the Partido ng Manggagawang Pilipino in 1999, but was later assassinated in 2001. Another brother, Edcel Lagman, was a human rights lawyer who served as Minority Floor Leader of the House of Representatives of the Philippines from 2010 to 2012. His nephew, Edcel Greco Lagman became Governor of Albay.

== See also ==
- List of people who disappeared mysteriously: 1910–1990
