= DWJP =

Radio station in Albay, Philippines

Rapido News FM (DWJP)
Camalig; Philippines
- Broadcast area: Albay and surrounding areas
- Frequency: 103.5 MHz
- Branding: 103.5 Rapido News FM

Programming
- Languages: Albayanon, Filipino
- Format: Contemporary MOR, News, Talk

Ownership
- Owner: People's Broadcasting Service
- Operator: Rapido Media Production

History
- First air date: March 1, 1998 (under Bombo Radyo); February 2020 (under Rapido Media)
- Former names: Star FM (March 1998-January 2006); Aguila News FM (February 2020-December 2023)

Technical information
- Licensing authority: NTC
- Power: 5,000 watts

DWJP (103.5 FM), broadcasting as 103.5 Rapido News FM, is a radio station owned by People's Broadcasting Service and operated by Rapido Media Production of Jayroll Baile. The station's studio and transmitter are located at Purok 2, Brgy. Quirangay, Camalig.

The station was formerly under Bombo Radyo Philippines through its now-defunct licensee Consolidated Broadcasting System. It was known as Star FM from its inception on March 1, 1998 to January 30, 2006, when it went off the air. Back then, it was located in Legazpi, Albay.
