= Albay Provincial Board =

Legislative body of the province of Albay, Philippines

Albay Provincial Board Sangguniang Panlalawigan ng Albay

Type
- Type: Unicameral
- Term limits: 3 terms (9 years)

Leadership
- Presiding Officer: Farida Co, Lakas–CMD since June 30, 2025

Structure
- Seats: 13 board members 1 ex officio presiding officer
- Political groups: Lakas (7); Liberal (2); PDP–Laban (1); NUP (1); Nonpartisan (2)
- Length of term: 3 years
- Authority: Local Government Code of the Philippines

Elections
- Voting system: Plurality-at-large (regular members); Indirect election (ex officio members)
- Last election: May 12, 2025
- Next election: May 8, 2028

Meeting place
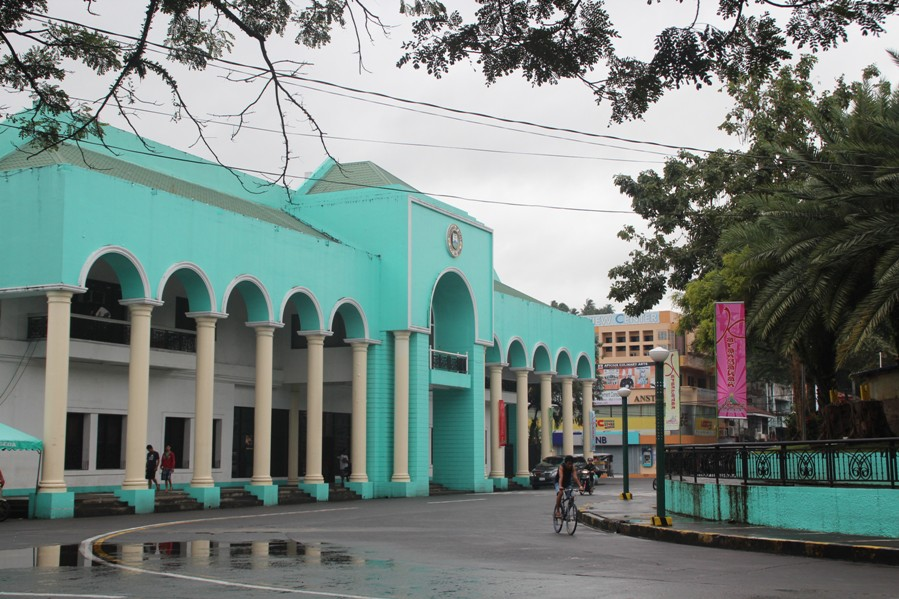

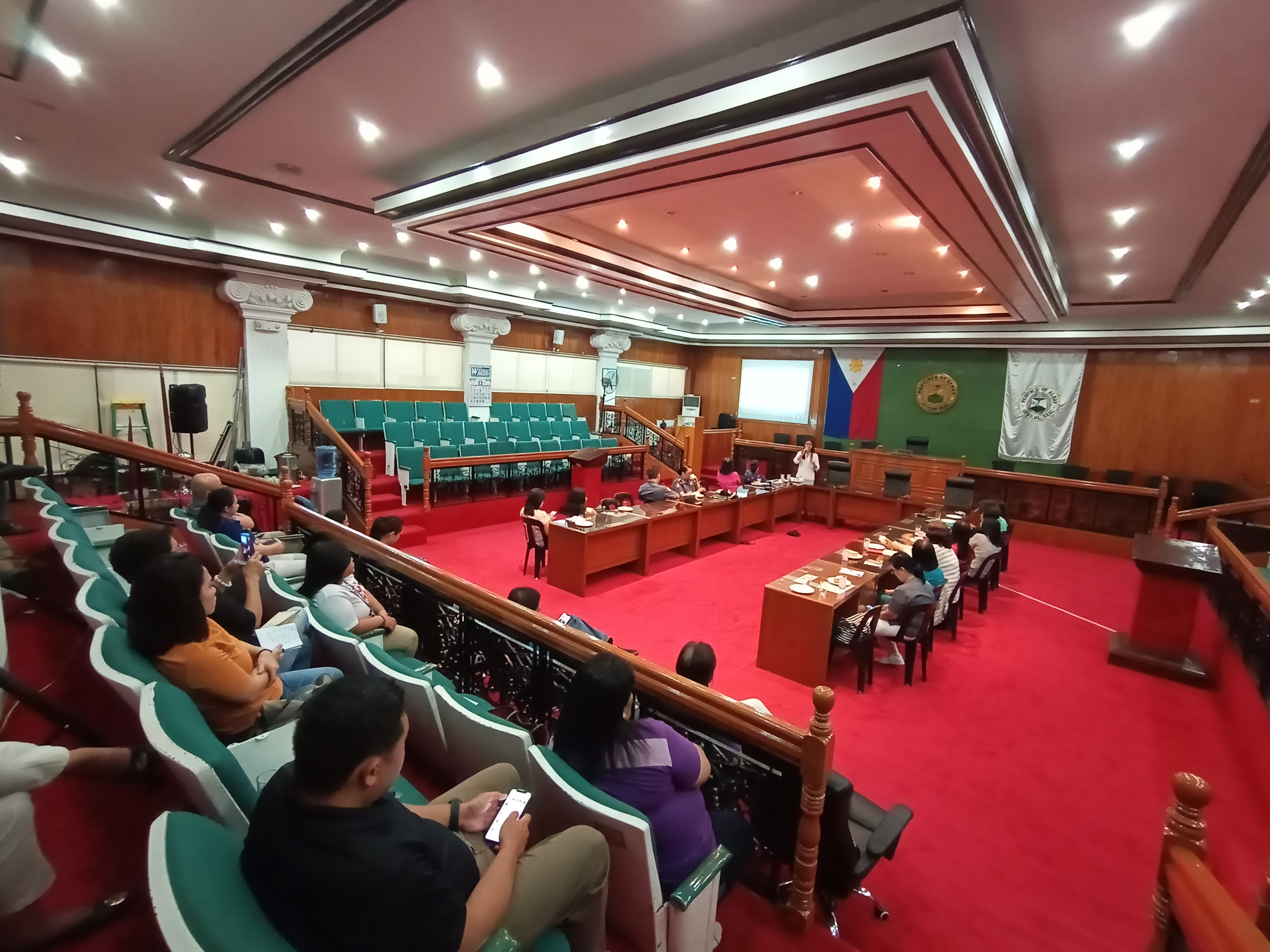
- Albay Provincial Capitol, Legazpi

The Albay Provincial Board is the Sangguniang Panlalawigan (provincial legislature) of the Philippine province of Albay.

The members are elected via plurality-at-large voting: the province is divided into three districts, with the first two having three seats and the third having four seats. A voter votes up to three names in the first and second districts and up to four names in the third district; the top candidates are then elected to fill the seats assigned to each district. The vice governor is the ex officio presiding officer, and only votes to break ties. The vice governor is elected via the plurality voting system province-wide.

Aside from the regular members, the board also includes the provincial federation presidents of the Liga ng mga Barangay (ABC, from its old name "Association of Barangay Captains"), the Sangguniang Kabataan (SK, youth councils) and the Philippine Councilors League (PCL) as ex officio members. They join the board once they are elected as president of their respective league or federation shortly after the start of their terms following the regular local elections (in the case of PCL) or the barangay and SK elections (in the case of ABC and SK).

== District apportionment ==
The districts used in appropriation of members is coextensive with the legislative districts of Albay.

Elections	No. of seats per district			Ex officio seats	Total seats
Elections	1st	2nd	3rd	Ex officio seats	Total seats
1992–present	3	3	4	3	13

== List of members ==
=== Current members ===
These are the members after the 2023 barangay and SK elections and the 2025 local elections.

The names of regular members are listed in order of their rank in the local election in their respective district.

- Vice Governor: Farida Co (Lakas-CMD)

Seat	Board member	Party	Term number	Start of term	End of term
1st district	Sheina Marie Onrubia-Dela Cruz	Liberal	1	June 30, 2025	June 30, 2028
1st district	John Gio Bongao	Liberal	1	June 30, 2025	June 30, 2028
1st district	Marian Caroline Ziga-So	Lakas–CMD	1	June 30, 2025	June 30, 2028
2nd district	Melissa Abadeza-Armedilla	Lakas–CMD	3	June 30, 2019	June 30, 2028
2nd district	Glenn Casulla	Lakas–CMD	1	June 30, 2025	June 30, 2028
2nd district	Harold O. Imperial	PDP–Laban	1	June 30, 2025	June 30, 2028
3rd district	Juan Miguel Ricardo Salceda	Lakas–CMD	1	June 30, 2025	June 30, 2028
3rd district	Brayan Arandia	Lakas–CMD	1	June 30, 2025	June 30, 2028
3rd district	Emmanuel Ribaya	Lakas–CMD	1	June 30, 2025	June 30, 2028
3rd district	Wilfredo Maronilla	Lakas–CMD	1	June 30, 2025	June 30, 2028
PCL	Patricia Gonzales-Alsua	NUP	1	August 1, 2025	June 30, 2028
ABC	Milagros B. Bal	Nonpartisan	1	July 18, 2025	January 1, 2026
SK	Carlos Matthew Gamboa	Nonpartisan	1	November 30, 2023	January 1, 2026

=== Vice Governor ===
Election year	Name	Party
1992	Danilo Azaña	NPC
1995	Danilo Azaña	NPC
1998	Jesus Calisin	Lakas
2001	Jesus Calisin	Lakas
2004	Jesus Calisin	Lakas
2007	Brando Sael	Independent
2010	Harold Imperial	Lakas–Kampi
2013	Harold Imperial	Liberal
2016	Harold Imperial	Liberal
2019	Edcel Greco Lagman (Note: Succeeded as governor on December 1, 2022 upon the disqualification of Governor Noel Rosal.)	PDP–Laban
2022	Edcel Greco Lagman	Aksyon
2022	Baby Glenda Ong-Bongao (Note: Board member succeeded as vice governor upon succession of Edcel Greco Lagman as governor.)	Liberal
2022	Reynaldo Bragais (Note: Board member succeeded as vice governor upon Ong-Bongao's succession as governor following Edcel Greco Lagman's dismissal in 2025.)	Lakas
2025	Farida Co	Lakas

=== 1st District ===
- City: Tabaco
- Municipalities: Bacacay, Malilipot, Malinao, Santo Domingo, Tiwi
- Population (2020): 395,907
- Electorate (2025): 274,872

Election year	Member (party)	Member (party)	Member (party)
1992	Jesus Calisin (Lakas–NUCD)	Vicente Go (Liberal/PDP)	Clenio Cabredo (LDP)
1995	Tobias Betito (Lakas–NUCD)	Jose Marino Madrilejos (LDP)	Silverio Cope (Lakas–NUCD)
1998	Felipe Berces (LAMMP)	Jose Marino Madrilejos (LAMMP)	Silverio Cope (Lakas–NUCD)
2001	Felipe Berces (Lakas–NUCD)	Jose Marino Madrilejos (Lakas–NUCD)	Celso Aytona (Aksyon)
2004	Raul Roi Borejon (Lakas-CMD)	Felipe Berces (PMP)	Celso Aytona (Lakas-CMD)
2007	Raul Roi Borejon (Lakas-CMD)	Glenda Bongao (Lakas-CMD)	Celso Aytona (Lakas-CMD)
2010	Nemesio Neron (Liberal)	Glenda Bongao (Lakas-Kampi)	Richard Ziga (Liberal)
2013	Job Belen (Liberal)	Glenda Bongao (Liberal)	Jose Marino Madrilejos (Independent)
2016	Job Belen (Liberal)	Rey Bragais (Liberal)	Victor Ziga Jr. (UNA)
2019	Glenda Bongao (Note: Elevated to Vice Governor on December 1, 2022) (Liberal)	Rey Bragais (Liberal)	Victor Ziga Jr. (UNA)
2022	Glenda Bongao (Liberal)	Rey Bragais (Liberal)	Victor Ziga Jr. (Lakas–CMD)
2022	Sheina Marie Onrubia-Dela Cruz (Note: Appointed by President Bongbong Marcos on May 13, 2024; took oath on May 27, 2024) (Liberal)	Rey Bragais (Liberal)	Victor Ziga Jr. (Lakas–CMD)
2025	Sheina Marie Onrubia-Dela Cruz (Liberal)	John Gio Bongao (Liberal)	Marian Caroline Ziga-So (Lakas–CMD)

=== 2nd District ===
- City: Legazpi
- Municipalities: Camalig, Daraga, Manito, Rapu-Rapu
- Population (2020): 477,781
- Electorate (2025): 327,382

Election year	Member (party)	Member (party)	Member (party)
1992	Juan Victoria (NPC)	Jesus Marcellana (Lakas–NUCD)	Lorenzo Reyes (NPC)
1995	Rodolfo Ante (Lakas–NUCD)	Hernandez Baldo (Lakas–NUCD)	Ramon Lawenko (NPC)
1998	Ralph Andes (Independent)	Sofio Ayala (Lakas–NUCD)	Ramon Lawenko (Lakas–NUCD)
2001	Ralph Andes (Lakas-CMD)	Remedios Manzanilla (Aksyon)	Ramon Lawenko (Aksyon)
2004	Ralph Andes (Lakas-CMD)	Jose Esteves Jr. (Independent)	Neil Montallana (Lakas-CMD)
2007	Carlwyn Baldo (Lakas-CMD)	Ostiano Calleja (Independent)	Neil Montallana (Lakas-CMD)
2010	Niño Imperial (Lakas-Kampi)	Ralph Andes (Nacionalista)	Neil Montallana (Lakas-Kampi)
2013	Oscar Cristobal (Liberal)	Ralph Andes (Liberal)	Richard Imperial (Liberal)
2016	Raul Rosal (Liberal)	Ralph Andes (Liberal)	Richard Imperial (Liberal)
2019	Raul Rosal (Independent)	Melissa Abadeza-Armedillo (PDP–Laban)	Neil Montallana (PDP–Laban)
2022	Raul Rosal (KANP)	Melissa Abadeza-Armedillo (Nacionalista)	Vince Baltazar (PDP–Laban)
2025	Glenn Casulla (Lakas-CMD)	Melissa Abadeza-Armedillo (Lakas-CMD)	Harold O. Imperial (PDP–Laban)

=== 3rd District ===
- City: Ligao
- Municipalities: Guinobatan, Jovellar, Libon, Oas, Pio Duran, Polangui
- Population (2020): 489,114
- Electorate (2025): 337,820

Election year	Member (party)	Member (party)	Member (party)	Member (party)
1992	Ramon Fernandez Jr. (NPC)	Masikap Fontanilla (NPC)	Arturo Osia (LDP)	Nemesio Baclao (NP)
1995	Ramon Alsua (Lakas–NUCD)	Juan Rivera (Lakas–NUCD)	Irineo Sales Jr. (Lakas–NUCD)	Nemesio Baclao (NPC)
1998	Ramon Alsua (Lakas–NUCD)	Ramon Fernandez Jr. (Lakas–NUCD)	Irineo Sales Jr. (Lakas–NUCD)	Jesus Rances (Lakas–NUCD)
2001	Ramon Alsua (Lakas–NUCD)	Ramon Fernandez Jr. (Lakas–NUCD)	Irineo Sales Jr. (Lakas–NUCD)	Jesus Rances (Lakas–NUCD)
2004	Ramon Fernandez Jr. (Lakas-CMD)	Harold Imperial (Lakas-CMD)	Jose Saribong (PMP)	Jesus Rances (Lakas-CMD)
2007	Ramon Alsua (Independent)	Harold Imperial (Lakas-CMD)	Herbert Borja (NPC)	Irineo Sales Jr. (Independent)
2010	Ramon Alsua (Lakas-Kampi)	Arnold Embestro (Independent)	Herbert Borja (Lakas-Kampi)	Irineo Sales Jr. (Lakas-Kampi)
2013	Ramon Alsua (Liberal)	Rhederick Riva (Independent)	Herbert Borja (Liberal)	Irineo Sales Jr. (Liberal)
2016	Jesus Salceda Jr. (Liberal)	Dante Arandia (UNA)	Howard Sim Imperial (Independent)	Eva Josephine Ribaya (Independent)
2019	Jesus Salceda Jr. (PDP–Laban)	Dante Arandia (PDP–Laban)	Howard Sim Imperial (PDP–Laban)	Eva Josephine Ribaya (PDP–Laban)
2022	Jesus Salceda Jr. (NUP)	Dante Arandia (PROMDI)	Gerardo Palmiano (NUP)	Eva Josephine Ribaya (Nacionalista)
2025	Juan Miguel Ricardo Salceda (Lakas-CMD)	Brayan Arandia (Lakas-CMD)	Emmanuel Ribaya (Lakas-CMD)	Wilfredo Maronilla (Lakas-CMD)

=== Liga ng mga Barangay member ===
Election year	ABC/LB President	Barangay Captain of
2018	Joseph Philip Lee	Bgy. 34 - Oro Site-Magallanes St., Legazpi City
2022	Dennise L. Misolania	Bgy. Cotmon, Camalig
2023*	Hisham Ismail	Bgy. 18 - Cabagñan West, Legazpi City
2025	Milagros Bal	Bgy. 18 - Cabagñan West, Legazpi City

*Took office in 2024

=== Philippine Councilors League member ===
Election year	PCL President	Councilor in
2001	Alfredo C. Balbin, Jr. (Lakas-NUCD)	Sto. Domingo
2013	Neil L. Montallana (Liberal Party)	Daraga
2016	Alan O. Rañola (Liberal Party)	Legazpi City
2019	Jesciel Richard Salceda (PDP–Laban)	Polangui
2022	Juan Miguel Ricardo Salceda (NUP)	Polangui
2025	Patricia Gonzales-Alsua (NUP)	Ligao

=== Sangguniang Kabataan member ===
Election year	SK President	SK Chairperson of
1997	Alwin Nuñez	
2018	Jesus Go	Bgy. Cotmon, Camalig
2023	Carlos Matthew Gamboa	Bgy. Cabagñan, Camalig
