= Edcel Lagman =

Filipino politician (1942–2025)

Edcel C. Lagman
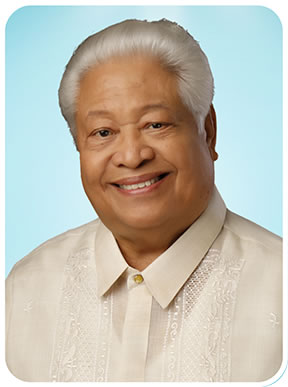
- Official portrait, 2022

House Minority Leader
- In office July 26, 2010 – January 20, 2012
- Preceded by: Ronaldo Zamora
- Succeeded by: Danilo Suarez

Member of the House of Representatives from Albay's 1st District
- In office June 30, 2016 – January 30, 2025
- Preceded by: Edcel Greco Lagman
- Succeeded by: Krisel Lagman
- In office June 30, 2004 – June 30, 2013
- Preceded by: Krisel Lagman
- Succeeded by: Edcel Greco Lagman
- In office June 30, 1987 – June 30, 1998
- Preceded by: Amando Cope
- Succeeded by: Krisel Lagman-Luistro

17th President of the Liberal Party
- In office September 30, 2022 – January 30, 2025
- Preceded by: Francis Pangilinan
- Succeeded by: Erin Tañada (acting)

President of the Lakas–CMD
- In office February 25, 2011 – January 19, 2012
- Preceded by: Gloria Macapagal Arroyo
- Succeeded by: Bong Revilla

Personal details
- Born: Edcel Castelar Lagman; May 1, 1942 Malinao, Albay, Philippines
- Died: January 30, 2025 (aged 82)
- Resting place: Loyola Memorial Park
- Party: Liberal (2012–2025)
- Other political affiliations: UNIDO (1980–1987); LnB (1987–1988); LDP (1988–2001); LAMMP (1998–2001); Lakas (2001–2012)
- Spouse: Maria Cielo Burce (died 2017)
- Relations: Filemon Lagman (brother)
- Children: 7, including Edcel Greco and Krisel
- Education: University of the Philippines Diliman (BA, LL.B)
- Occupation: Politician
- Profession: Lawyer
- Website: Official website

Edcel Castelar Lagman Sr. (Tagalog pronunciation: [ˈʔedsɛl], May 1, 1942 – January 30, 2025) was a Filipino human rights lawyer and politician from the province of Albay. He was elected as a member of the House from 1987 to 1998 and 2004 to 2013 and from 2016 up until his death. He served as Minority Floor Leader of the House of Representatives of the Philippines until 2012, when he resigned the office. Lagman was one of the key Liberal Party figures in the House of Representatives, having supported the Responsible Parenthood and Reproductive Health Act (which he principally authored), the SOGIE Equality Bill, the Free Tertiary Education Act, the Anti-Dynasty Bill, and the Freedom of Information Bill. He was also the principal author of the Divorce Bill, the Human Rights Defenders Bill, the Prevention of Teenage Pregnancy Bill, and the Anti-Child Marriage Bill.

Lagman was instrumental to the abolition of the death penalty in the Philippines in 2006 and continued to oppose proposals to reinstate capital punishment in the country. He was also the principal author of a triumvirate of human rights laws, namely the Anti-Torture Act of 2009 (R.A. 9745), the Anti-Enforced or Involuntary Disappearance Act of 2012 (R.A. 10353), and the Human Rights Victims Reparation and Recognition Act of 2013 (R.A. 10368).

== Early life and education ==
Edcel Castelar Lagman Sr. was born on May 1, 1942, in Malinao, Albay, to Pedro Eduardo Diaz Lagman Jr., a teacher and prosecutor, and Cecilia Castelar, who was also a teacher. His first name was derived from a combination of his parents' names. He was the eldest of six siblings.

Lagman had degrees in political science (cum laude) from the University of the Philippines Diliman in 1962, where he became a member of the Alpha Phi Beta fraternity. He eventually finished his Bachelor of Laws at the University of the Philippines College of Law in 1966. He also served as a managing editor of the Philippine Collegian and editor of the UP Law Register.

== Political life ==
Lagman first entered government as a deputy minister of the Ministry of Budget and Management in 1986, during the presidency of Corazon Aquino.

Lagman was elected to a total of eight terms as a member of the House of Representatives, representing the 1st district of Albay. He first served from 1987 to 1998, and then from 2004 to 2013, and from 2016 until his death in 2025. His daughter Krisel represented the district from 1998 to 2004 and his son Edcel Greco from 2013 to 2016. Lagman also ran for senator in 1998 under the Laban ng Makabayang Masang Pilipino coalition and for representative of the 4th district of Quezon City in 2001 but lost on both occasions. He was also the House Minority Leader from 2010 to 2012. He was the main proponent of the Responsible Parenthood and Reproductive Health Act of 2012.

Lagman was previously a member of Lakas-CMD, of which he was party president from 2011 to 2012, He later joined the Liberal Party and became its party president in 2022. During the presidency of Rodrigo Duterte, he was part of the Magnificent 7 opposition bloc in the House of Representatives.

== Controversy ==
On June 5, 2017, Lagman criticized the declaration of martial law because of the Siege of Marawi. The petition (Note: The petition is called the "Lagman Petition", but multiple representatives are included in the petition.) states that:

The declaration of martial law has no sufficient factual basis because there is no rebellion or invasion in Marawi City or in any part of Mindanao. It argues that acts of terrorism in Mindanao do not constitute rebellion since there is no proof that its purpose is to remove Mindanao or any part thereof from allegiance to the Philippines, its laws, or its territory.

In May 2024, former Senate President Tito Sotto claimed that the Absolute Divorce bill, which Lagman authored was "lost". The bill itself was accepted by the Philippine House of Representatives, considering the acceptance, Lagman claimed that Sotto was "lost". “I don’t think he knows how to count. It’s as if he was not Senate president,” Lagman said. The bill was also criticized by the Catholic Bishops' Conference of the Philippines, Fr. Jerome Secillano stated that “It’s not surprising anymore. The Lower House always passed it in previous Congress. We already have existing legal remedies to couple separation and yet Congress decided to add more”.

== Personal life ==
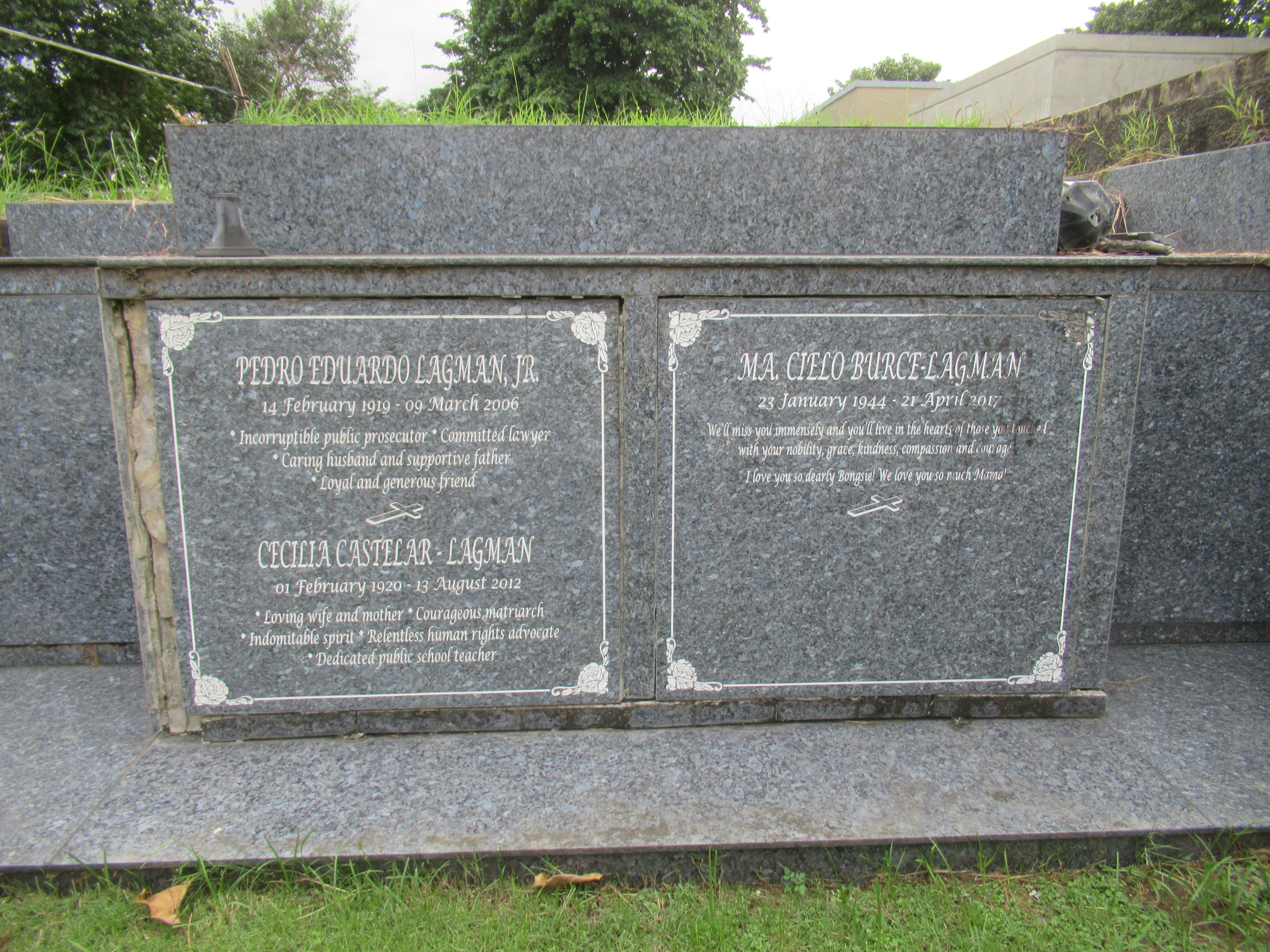
Gravesite of Lagman's parents Pedro Lagman Jr. and Cecilia Castelar-Lagman and wife Maria Cielo Burce-Lagman at Loyola Memorial Park, Marikina

Lagman was the elder brother of Filemon "Popoy" Lagman, the founder of the Partido ng Manggagawa and the Alex Boncayao Brigade who was assassinated in 2001. Another brother, Hermon, was a political activist who disappeared during the martial law government of President Ferdinand Marcos.

Lagman was married to Maria Cielo Lagman (née Burce) (1944–2017), Tabaco's first elected woman City Mayor and has seven children including Krisel, Edcel Greco. Edcel Greco became Governor of Albay.

== Death and funeral ==
Lagman died from a cardiac arrest on January 30, 2025, at the age of 82. His wake was first held at the Mount Carmel Shrine in Quezon City from January 31 to February 2, before being flown to Albay, where his remains lay at his residence in Bacacay until February 4 and at the Tabaco Church on February 4. A necrological service for him was held at the Batasang Pambansa on February 5. His remains returned to the Mount Carmel Shrine for another wake until his interment at the Loyola Memorial Park in Marikina on February 10.

== Notes ==
House of Representatives of the Philippines
Preceded by Ronaldo Zamora	Minority Floor Leader of the House of Representatives; 2010–2012	Succeeded by Danilo Suarez
Vacant District reestablished Title last held by Armando Cope	Representative, 1st District of Albay; 1987–1998	Succeeded by Krisel Lagman
Preceded by Krisel Lagman	Representative, 1st District of Albay; 2004–2013	Succeeded by Edcel Greco Lagman
Preceded by Edcel Greco Lagman	Representative, 1st District of Albay; 2016–2025	Succeeded by Krisel Lagman
Party political offices
Preceded by Gloria Macapagal Arroyo as Chairman of Lakas–Kampi–CMD	Chairman of Lakas–CMD; 2011–2012	Succeeded by Bong Revilla
Preceded by Francis Pangilinan	President of the Liberal Party; 2022–2025	Succeeded by Erin Tañada
