= List of vice governors of Albay =

Vice Governor of Albay
- Pangalawang Punong Lalawigan ng Albay
- Incumbent; Farida S. Co since June 30, 2025
- Seat: Albay Provincial Capitol
- Nominator: Political party
- Term length: 3 years Up to three terms

The Vice Governor of Albay (Filipino: Pangalawang Punong Lalawigan ng Albay) is the presiding officer of the Sangguniang Panlalawigan, the legislature of the provincial government of Albay, Philippines.

The current vice governor is Farida S. Co, in office since 2025.

== List of Vice Governors of Albay ==
Vice Governors of Albay

THIRD REPUBLIC OF THE PHILIPPINES (1946-1972)
No.	Portrait	Name	Term	Place of Origin	Note(s)
1		Jose S. Esteves, Sr. (Jose Esteves, Sr. y Sapalicio)	1960-1962	Legazpi	
2		Faustino N. Nuyda (Faustino Nuyda y Nieva)	1963-1965	Camalig	
3		Tirzo O. Delos Reyes (Tirzo Delos Reyes y Ortega)	1966-1968	Guinobatan	
4		Jesus S. Salalima (Jesus Salalima y Sañosa)	1969-1972	Polangui	

MARTIAL LAW AND FOURTH PHILIPPINE REPUBLIC (1972-1986)
No.	Portrait	Name	Term	Place of Origin	Note(s)
4		Jesus S. Salalima (Jesus Salalima y Sañosa)	1972-1975	Polangui	
5		Querubin M. Dycoco (Querubin Dycoco y Madrid)	1980-1986	Libon	

FIFTH PHILIPPINE REPUBLIC (1986-PRESENT)
No.	Portrait	Name	Term	Place of Origin	Note(s)
6		Alfonso P. Bichara (Alfonso Bichara y Panayotti)	1986-1987	Ligao	
7		Senen R. Rances (Senen Rances y Rangasajo)	1987	Oas	
8		Danilo S. Azaña (Danilo Azaña y Serrano)	1988-1994	Legazpi	
9		Jesus James B. Calisin (Jesus James Calisin y Bragais)	1994-1995	Tabaco	
10		Marcial E. Tuanqui (Marcial Tuanqui y Estevez)	1995	Polangui	
(8)		Danilo S. Azaña (Danilo Azaña y Serrano)	1995-1998	Legazpi	
11		Rodolfo P. Ante (Rodolfo Ante y Pulvinar)	1998	Legazpi	
12		Silverio C. Cope (Silverio Cope y Competente)	1998	Tabaco	
(9)		Jesus James B. Calisin (Jesus James Calisin y Bragais)	1998-2007	Tabaco	
13		Brando M. Sael (Brando Sael y Mella)	2007-2010	Polangui	
14		Harold O. Imperial (Harold Imperial y Ong)	2010-2019	Polangui	
15		Edcel Greco Lagman (Edcel Greco Alexandre Lagman, Jr. y Burce)	2019-2022	Tabaco	
16		Glenda O. Bongao (Baby Glenda Bongao y Ong)	2022-April 25, 2025	Tabaco	
17		Reynaldo B. Bragais (Rey Bragais y Benig)	April 25, 2025 - June 30, 2025	Tabaco	Acting
18		Farida S. Co (Farida Co y Salcedo)	June 30, 2025 - present	Legazpi	Incumbent

== See also ==
- Governor of Albay
