= Krisel Lagman =

Filipino politician (born 1968)

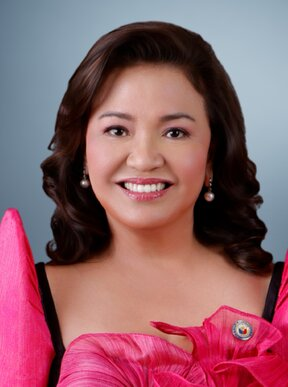
- Official portrait, 2026

Member of the Philippine House of Representatives from Albay's 1st District
- Incumbent
- Assumed office June 30, 2025
- Preceded by: Edcel Lagman
- In office June 30, 1998 – June 30, 2004
- Preceded by: Edcel Lagman
- Succeeded by: Edcel Lagman

House Deputy Minority Leader
- Incumbent
- Assumed office July 30, 2025
- Leader: Marcelino Libanan

Mayor of Tabaco
- In office June 30, 2016 – June 30, 2025
- Preceded by: Marie Demetriou
- Succeeded by: Reynaldo Bragais
- In office June 30, 2007 – June 30, 2013
- Succeeded by: Marie Demetriou

Executive Vice President of the Liberal Party
- Incumbent
- Assumed office January 24, 2026
- Preceded by: Erin Taneda

Personal details
- Born: Cielo Krisel Burce Lagman; November 9, 1968 (age 57) Quezon City, Philippines
- Party: Liberal (2012–present)
- Other political affiliations: Lakas (2001–2012); LAMMP (1998–2001); LDP (1998–2001); Sanlakas (until 2000)
- Spouse: Mon Luistro
- Children: 3
- Parents: Edcel Lagman (father); Maria Cielo Almojuela Burce (mother)
- Relatives: Filemon Lagman (uncle); Edcel Greco Lagman (brother)
- Education: University of the Philippines Diliman (BS, MPA); Neumann University (BS)

Cielo Krisel Burce Lagman (born November 9, 1968) is a Filipino politician who has been the representative for Albay's first district since 2025, a seat she previously held from 1998 to 2004. A member of the Liberal Party, she had previously served as the mayor of Tabaco, Albay, from 2007 to 2013 and again from 2016 to 2025.

== Early life and education ==
Cielo Krisel Burce Lagman was born in Quezon City, Philippines, on November 9, 1968. She is the eldest child of former Albay first district representative Edcel Lagman and Maria Cielo Burce. She studied at the University of the Philippines (UP) Diliman where she obtained a bachelor's degree in zoology. She also studied in the United States graduating with a bachelor's degree in nursing and public health from Neumann College in Aston, Pennsylvania. In 2015, Krisel obtained a master's degree in public administration at the UP National College of Public Administration and Governance with a summa cum laude grade point average.

== Political career ==
=== House of Representatives (1998–2004) ===
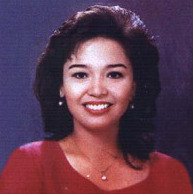
Portrait during the 12th Congress

Krisel Lagman first became a member of the House of Representatives as a representative of Albay's 1st district in 1998; her predecessor was her father Edcel Lagman. She was a former member of the Laban ng Demokratikong Pilipino (LDP), which is part of the Laban ng Makabayang Masang Pilipino (LAMMP) coalition which elected Joseph Estrada as president in 1998. Simultaneously, she was also the vice president of the Luzon chapter of Sanlakas, a political organization that advocated for the rights of laborers and marginalized sectors.

In 1999, Lagman exposed an attempt by Mary Ann Maslog, who allegedly offered her an opportunity illicitly earn 40 percent commission for the purchase of school supplies for Albay's 1st district.

In 2000, Lagman was among the LDP politicians to sign the impeachment complaint against Estrada. This led to the anti-Estrada faction of LDP to splinter by the following year. Estrada was deposed in the Second EDSA Revolution in January 2001.

She was the principal author of the House version of a legislation converting Tabaco from a municipality into a city – House Bill No. 9794. Residents of the then-municipality ratified the law in 2001.

Her father Edcel Lagman retook her position after the latter won the 2004 election. The elder Lagman served until 2013.

=== Mayor of Tabaco ===
Lagman first became the second female mayor of her hometown of Tabaco after she won the 2007 election. In the 2013 election, Lagman failed to get a third consecutive term after she lost to Marie Demetriou. Lagman was reelected as mayor in the 2016 election.

=== House of Representatives (2025–present) ===
Lagman ran in Albay's 1st congressional district during the 2025 elections. She won with 128,871 votes. She pledge to pursue the passage of a law legalizing divorce in the Philippines as well as providing financial aid to solo parents. She won the race, marking her return to the Congress after 21 years and succeeding her late father five months after his death.

=== Views ===
Similar to her father, Lagman opposed capital punishment.

House of Representatives of the Philippines
Preceded by Edcel Lagman	Representative, 1st District of Albay; 2025–present 1998–2004	Incumbent
Preceded by Edcel Lagman	Representative, 1st District of Albay; 2025–present 1998–2004	Succeeded by Edcel Lagman
Political offices
Preceded by Marie Demetriou	Mayor of Tabaco; 2016–2025; 2007–2013	Succeeded by Reynaldo Bragais
Unknown	Mayor of Tabaco; 2016–2025; 2007–2013	Succeeded by Marie Demetriou
