= Governor of Albay =

Local chief executive

- Punong Lalawigan ng Albay
- Incumbent; Noel Rosal since June 30, 2025
- Style: Governor (informal); The Honorable (formal)
- Seat: Albay Provincial Capitol, Legazpi City
- Appointer: Elected via popular vote
- Term length: 3 years, not eligible for re-election immediately after three consecutive terms
- Inaugural holder: Jose Maria Peñaranda (Spanish administration); Anacleto M. Solano (Revolutionary Government); Arlington U. Betts (Civil Government)
- Formation: 1834 (start of the Spanish administration); 1898 (start of the Revolutionary Government); 1902 (start of the Civil Government by virtue of Philippine Commission Provincial Government Act)
- Deputy: Vice Governor
- Website: Official Website of the Province of Albay

The governor of Albay (Filipino: Punong Lalawigan ng Albay; Central Bikol: Gobernador kan Albay) is the chief executive of the provincial government of Albay, Philippines. Like all local government heads in the Philippines, the governor is elected via popular vote, and may not be elected for a fourth consecutive term (although the former governor may return to office after an interval of one term). In case of death, resignation or incapacity, the vice governor becomes the governor.

The current governor is Noel E. Rosal, who was re-elected governor in the May 12, 2025 Midterm elections.

== List of governors of Albay ==
Governors of Albay

SPANISH COLONIAL ERA (1885-1898)
| No. | Name | Term | Place of Origin | Note(s) |
|---|---|---|---|---|
| - | Juan Alvarez Guerra | 1885 - 1890 (5 years, 0 days) | Spain | |
| - | Antonio Diaz Valdes | 1890 - 1893 (3 years, 0 days) | Spain | |
| - | Angel de Bascaran Federich | 1893 - September 22, 1898 (5 years, 264 days) | Spain | |

FIRST PHILIPPINE REPUBLIC (1898-1900)
| No. | Portrait | Name | Term | Place of Origin | Note(s) |
|---|---|---|---|---|---|
| 1 | | Anacleto M. Solano (Anacleto Solano y Moya) | September 22, 1898 - December 31, 1898 (100 days) | Camalig | |
| 2 | | Domingo S. Samson (Domingo Samson y Solano ) | January 1, 1899 - September 15, 1900 (1 year, 257 days) | Camalig | |

PHILIPPINE LEGISLATURE (1900-1937)
| No. | Portrait | Name | Term | Place of Origin | Note(s) |
|---|---|---|---|---|---|
| 3 | | Brig. Gen. William August Kobbé | January 15, 1900 - March 20, 1900 (64 days) | United States | Military Governor |
| 4 | | Gen. James M. Bell (James Montgomery Bell) | March 20, 1900 - February 23, 1902 (1 year, 340 days) | United States | Military Governor |
| 5 | | Arlington U. Betts (Arlington Ulysses Betts) | February 24, 1902 - March 6, 1904 (2 years, 11 days) | United States | |
| 6 | | Ramon F. Santos (Ramon Santos y Francisco) | March 7, 1904 - February 18, 1906 (1 year, 348 days) | Ligao | |
| 7 | | Charles A. Reynolds (Charles Albert Reynolds) | February 19, 1906 - February 20, 1908 (2 years, 1 day) | United States | |
| (2) | | Domingo S. Samson (Domingo Samson y Solano) | February 21, 1908 - October 15, 1912 (4 years, 237 days) | Camalig | |
| 8 | | Leoncio Duran Imperial (Leoncio Imperial y Duran) | October 16, 1912 - October 3, 1916 (3 years, 353 days) | Legazpi | |
| 9 | | Rufino S. Tuanqui (Rufino Tuanqui y Sarte) | October 3, 1916 - August 19, 1917 (320 days) | Polangui | |
| 10 | | Timoteo B. Alcala (Timoteo Alcala y Bautista) | August 20, 1917 - October 15, 1919 (3 years, 56 days) | Legazpi | Acting |
| 11 | | Jose O. Vera (Jose Vera y Olfinas) | October 16, 1919 - October 15, 1922 (2 years, 364 days) | Pandan, Albay | |
| (8) | | Leoncio Duran Imperial (Leoncio Imperial y Duran) | October 16, 1922 - October 15, 1925 (2 years, 364 days) | Legazpi | |
| 12 | | Mariano A. Locsin (Mariano Locsin y Anson) | October 16, 1925 - October 15, 1934 (8 years, 364 days) | Daraga | |
| 13 | | Jose S. Imperial (Jose Imperial y Samson) | October 16, 1934 - December 30, 1937 (3 years, 75 days) | Legazpi | |

COMMONWEALTH OF THE PHILIPPINES (1937-1946)
| No. | Portrait | Name | Term | Place of Origin | Note(s) |
|---|---|---|---|---|---|
| 14 | | Manuel M. Calleja (Manuel Calleja y Maronilla) | January 1, 1938 - December 30, 1940 (2 years, 364 days) | Libon | |
| 15 | | Saturnino R. Benito (Saturnino Benito y Rabana) | January 1, 1941 - 1945 (4 years, 0 days) | Legazpi | |
| Act | | Silvino R. Samson (Silvino Samson y Rabuy) | August 27, 1941 - September 24, 1941 (28 days) | Libon | |

JAPANESE OCCUPATION & SECOND PHILIPPINE REPUBLIC (1941-1945)
| No. | Portrait | Name | Term | Place of Origin | Note(s) |
|---|---|---|---|---|---|
| (12) | | Mariano A. Locsin (Mariano Locsin y Anson) | May 5, 1942 - February 1, 1943 (275 days) | Daraga | |
| 16 | | Julian B. Locsin, Jr. (Julian Locsin, Jr. y Ballesteros) | February 2, 1943 - April 30, 1944 (1 year, 88 days) | Daraga | |
| (12) | | Mariano A. Locsin (Mariano Locsin y Anson) | May 1, 1944 - September 29, 1945 (1 year, 151 days) | Daraga | |

THIRD PHILIPPINE REPUBLIC (1946-1972)
| No. | Portrait | Name | Term | Place of Origin | Note(s) |
|---|---|---|---|---|---|
| 17 | | Venancio Prieto Ziga (Venancio Ziga y Prieto) | June 13, 1946 - December 30, 1951 (5 years, 200 days) | Bacacay | |
| (14) | | Manuel M. Calleja (Manuel Calleja y Maronilla) | January 1, 1952 - December 30, 1955 (3 years, 363 days) | Libon | |
| 18 | | Nicanor A. Maronilla-Seva, Jr. (Nicanor Maronilla-Seva, Jr. y Aguilar) | January 1, 1956 - November 4, 1962 (6 years, 307 days) | Libon | |
| 19 | | Jose S. Estevez, Sr. (Jose Estevez, Sr. y Sapalicio) | November 5, 1962 - December 30, 1971 (9 years, 55 days) | Legazpi | |

MARTIAL LAW & FOURTH PHILIPPINE REPUBLIC (1972-1986)
| No. | Portrait | Name | Term | Place of Origin | Note(s) |
|---|---|---|---|---|---|
| 20 | | Atty. Felix S. Imperial, Jr. (Felix Imperial, Jr. y Stedje) | January 1, 1972 - February 25, 1986 (14 years, 55 days) | Polangui | |

PROVISIONAL GOVERNMENT (1986-1988)
| No. | Portrait | Name | Term | Place of Origin | Note(s) |
|---|---|---|---|---|---|
| 21 | | Crispin J. Rayala (Crispin Rayala y Jacob) | 1986 - February 1, 1988 (1 year, 333 days) | Polangui | |
| Act | | Jose L. Sarte, Jr. (Jose Sarte, Jr. y Lozano) | 1987 | Polangui | |

FIFTH PHILIPPINE REPUBLIC (1987-Present)
| No. | Portrait | Name | Term | Place of Origin | Note(s) |
|---|---|---|---|---|---|
| 22 | | Romeo R. Salalima (Romeo Salalima y Rayala) | February 2, 1988 - October 7, 1994 (6 years, 247 days) | Polangui | |
| Act | | Dominador I. Lim (Dominador Lim y Imperial) | October 7, 1994 - April 7, 1995 (182 days) | Legazpi | |
| 23 | | Victor San Andres Ziga (Victor Ziga y San Andres) | April 10, 1995 - June 30, 1995 (81 days) | Tabaco | |
| 24 | | Al Francis C. Bichara (Al Francis Bichara y Del Castillo) | June 30, 1995 - June 30, 2004 (9 years, 0 days) | Ligao | |
| 25 | | Fernando V. Gonzalez (Fernando Gonzales y Vallejo) | June 30, 2004 - June 30, 2007 (3 years, 0 days) | Ligao | |
| 26 | | Joey Salceda (Jose Ma. Clemente Salceda y Sarte) | June 30, 2007 - June 30, 2016 (9 years, 0 days) | Polangui | |
| (24) | | Al Francis C. Bichara (Al Francis Bichara y Del Castillo) | June 30, 2016 - June 30, 2022 (6 years, 0 days) | Ligao | |
| 27 | | Noel Rosal (Noel Rosal y Ebriega) | June 30, 2022 - December 1, 2022 (154 days) | Legazpi | |
| 28 | | Atty. Edcel Greco Lagman (Edcel Greco Alexandre Lagman y Burce) | December 2, 2022 - April 25, 2025 (2 years, 144 days) | Tabaco | |
| 29 | | Glenda O. Bongao (Baby Glenda Bongao y Ong) | October 18, 2024 - April 18, 2025 (182 days) (as Acting Governor) April 25, 2025 - June 30, 2025 (66 days) | Tabaco | First Female Governor of Albay |
| (27) | | Noel Rosal (Noel Rosal y Ebriega) | June 30, 2025 - present 1 year, 143 days | Legazpi | |

== See also ==
- List of vice governors of Albay
- Albay Provincial Board
- Albay's 1st congressional district
- Albay's 2nd congressional district
- Albay's 3rd congressional district
