= Edcel Greco Lagman =

Filipino lawyer and politician (born 1972)

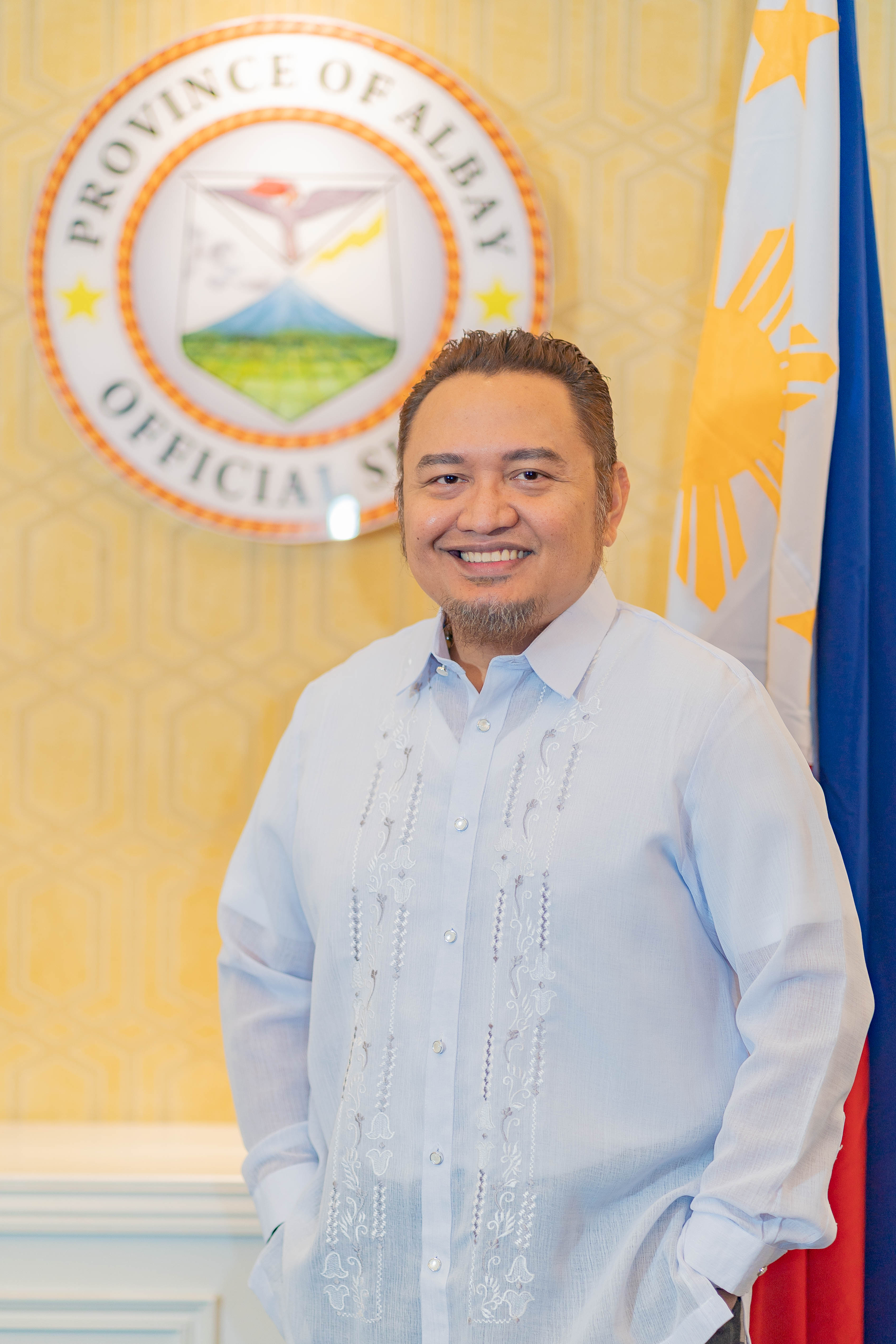
- Lagman in 2022

28th Governor of Albay
- In office December 1, 2022 (Note: Suspended from October 18, 2024 until his termination on April 25, 2025.) – April 25, 2025
- Vice Governor: Glenda Bongao
- Preceded by: Noel Rosal
- Succeeded by: Glenda Bongao (Note: Acted from October 18, 2024 to April 25, 2025.)

15th Vice Governor of Albay
- In office June 30, 2019 – November 30, 2022
- Governor: Al Francis Bichara (2019–2022); Noel Rosal (2022)
- Preceded by: Harold Imperial
- Succeeded by: Glenda Ong Bongao

Member of the House of Representatives from Albay's 1st district
- In office June 30, 2013 – June 30, 2016
- Preceded by: Edcel Lagman
- Succeeded by: Edcel Lagman

Member of the Quezon City Council from the 4th district
- In office June 30, 2004 – March 31, 2012

Personal details
- Born: Edcel Greco Alexandre Burce Lagman; July 24, 1972 (age 54) Caloocan, Rizal, Philippines
- Party: PFP (2023–present)
- Other political affiliations: Aksyon (2021–2023); PDP–Laban (2018–2021); Liberal (2009–2018); Lakas (2004–2009)
- Spouse(s): Ivy Xenia P. Lim (m. 1996; ann. 2022) Ana Lea B. Celestino (m. 2023)
- Children: 7
- Parents: Edcel Castelar Lagman (father); Maria Cielo Almojuela Burce (mother)
- Relatives: Filemon Lagman (uncle); Krisel Lagman (sister)
- Education: Benedictine Abbey School (secondary)
- Alma mater: University of the Philippines Manila (BA); University of the Philippines Diliman (MPA); San Beda University; Arellano University (LL.B)
- Occupation: Politician
- Profession: Lawyer

Edcel Greco Alexandre "Grex" Burce Lagman (born July 24, 1972), is a Filipino lawyer and politician from the province of Albay.

On December 1, 2022, he became Governor of Albay following the Commission on Elections (COMELEC) disqualification of former Governor Noel Rosal. Lagman previously served as Vice-Governor of Albay starting in 2019.

He was also elected in the House of Representatives of the Philippines as Congressman of the First District of Albay in 2013 and was elected as the Assistant Majority Floor Leader of the House of Representatives of the Philippines' 16th Congress from 2013 to 2016. Prior to this, Lagman served as a councilor of Quezon City representing its Fourth District from 2004 to 2013.

== Personal life ==
Lagman is the third child of human rights lawyer and politician Edcel Lagman and teacher Maria Cielo Burce. He has six siblings including the incumbent Tabaco Mayor and former Congresswoman Krisel Lagman.

Lagman has four sons and a daughter with his first wife Ivy Xenia P. Lim and two daughters with his present wife, Ana Lea B. Celestino-Lagman.

Lagman is part of a political family. His great grandfather, Felipe Almojuela, was the Lieutenant-Governor of Catanduanes when it was still a sub-province of Albay.

== Education ==
Lagman completed his primary and secondary education at San Beda College Alabang. He was a consistent honor student in grade school and high school.

In 1993, Lagman graduated with a Bachelor of Arts degree in Political Science and Behavioral Science from the University of the Philippines Manila. From 1990 to 1992, he was a college scholar.

He took his Bachelor of Laws at San Beda College of Law from 1993 to 1996 and from 1997 to 1999 at Arellano University School of Law (AUSL) where he was a Dean's Lister and a member of the maiden batch of the Order of the Flaming Arrows Honor Society. He graduated tenth (10th) in a class of 114 graduates. Lagman became a member of the Philippine Bar when he passed the 2000 Philippine Bar Examinations. He also took up Master in Public Administration at the National College of Public Administration and Governance of the University of the Philippines Diliman where he was a consistent university scholar.

== Legal and teaching career ==
In 1994, Lagman worked as Assistant Press Officer at the Embassy of the Philippines, Washington, D.C. In 2000, he worked as an associate at Lagman and Associates Law Offices founded by his father Congressman Edcel Lagman and uncle Filemon Lagman and devoted to providing pro bono legal services for workers and labor unions. In 2002, he was appointed as Court Attorney IV at the Supreme Court of the Philippines.

== Political career ==
=== City Councilor for the 4th district of Quezon City (2004–2012) ===
Before joining the national legislature, Lagman served as City Councilor of Quezon City from the 4th district from 2004 to 2012.

=== Representative of the 1st district of Albay (2013–2016) ===
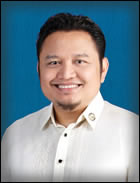
Portrait of Lagman during his term as Albay representative in the 16th Congress

In 2013, he was elected as Albay first district representative. As member of the House of Representatives, Lagman principally authored Republic Act No. 10868, or the Centenarians Act of 2016. Lagman is also a principal sponsor of several important legislations such as R.A. No. 10643, or the Graphic Health Warnings Law, R.A. No. 10645, or the Mandatory PhilHealth Coverage for Senior Citizens., R.A. No. 10679, or the Youth Entrepreneurship Act, and R.A. No. 10648, or the Iskolar ng Bayan Act of 2014.

=== Vice-Governor of Albay (2019–2022) ===
Lagman ran for Vice-Governor of Albay in 2019 and won. He was reelected as Vice-Governor in 2022.

=== Governor of Albay (2022–2025) ===
Five months into his second term as Vice-Governor, Lagman assumed the governorship by operation of law on December 1, 2022. This was due to a permanent vacancy in the position of Governor when his immediate predecessor Noel Rosal was disqualified with finality by the COMELEC en banc for violating the election law imposing a 45-day campaign spending ban.

Lagman in July 2023, became a member of incumbent President Bongbong Marcos' political party, the Partido Federal ng Pilipinas.

In October 2024, Lagman filed his candidacy to run for governor in his own right in the 2025 Philippine general election. However, he later announced his withdrawal from the race on December 5, 2024, and declared support for Noel Rosal's comeback attempt as governor. However, Rosal was later disqualified from the 2025 gubernatorial race, given his perpetual disqualification from running for public office.

=== Dismissal ===
In February 2024, Alwin Nimo, a former chairman of Barangay Anislag, Daraga, alleged that Lagman had received bribes from illegal gambling (jueteng) bosses in the province when he was vice governor and filed a complaint against the latter for graft and corruption at the Office of the Ombudsman. Lagman denied the accusations, calling it "driven by political motives." In October 2024, the Ombudsman imposed a preventive suspension on Lagman as part of its investigation into the charges. On April 10, 2025, the Ombudsman ordered Lagman's dismissal for grave misconduct.

Lagman was subsequently tried by the Sandiganbayan, but was acquitted on November 13, 2026 due to insufficient evidence.

== See also ==
- Governor of Albay
- House of Representatives
