= Camalig =

Municipality in Albay, Philippines

- Municipality
- Municipality of Camalig
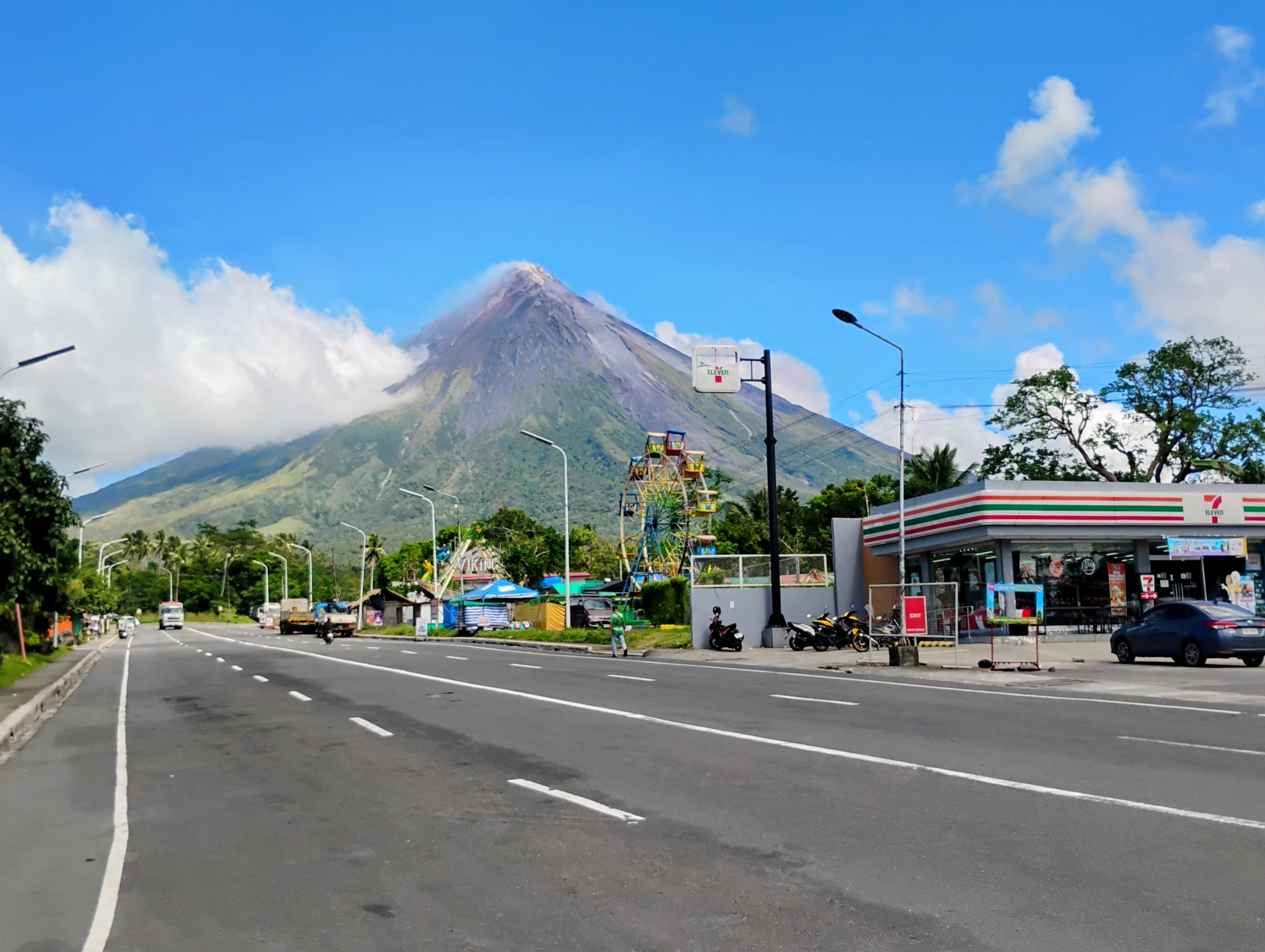
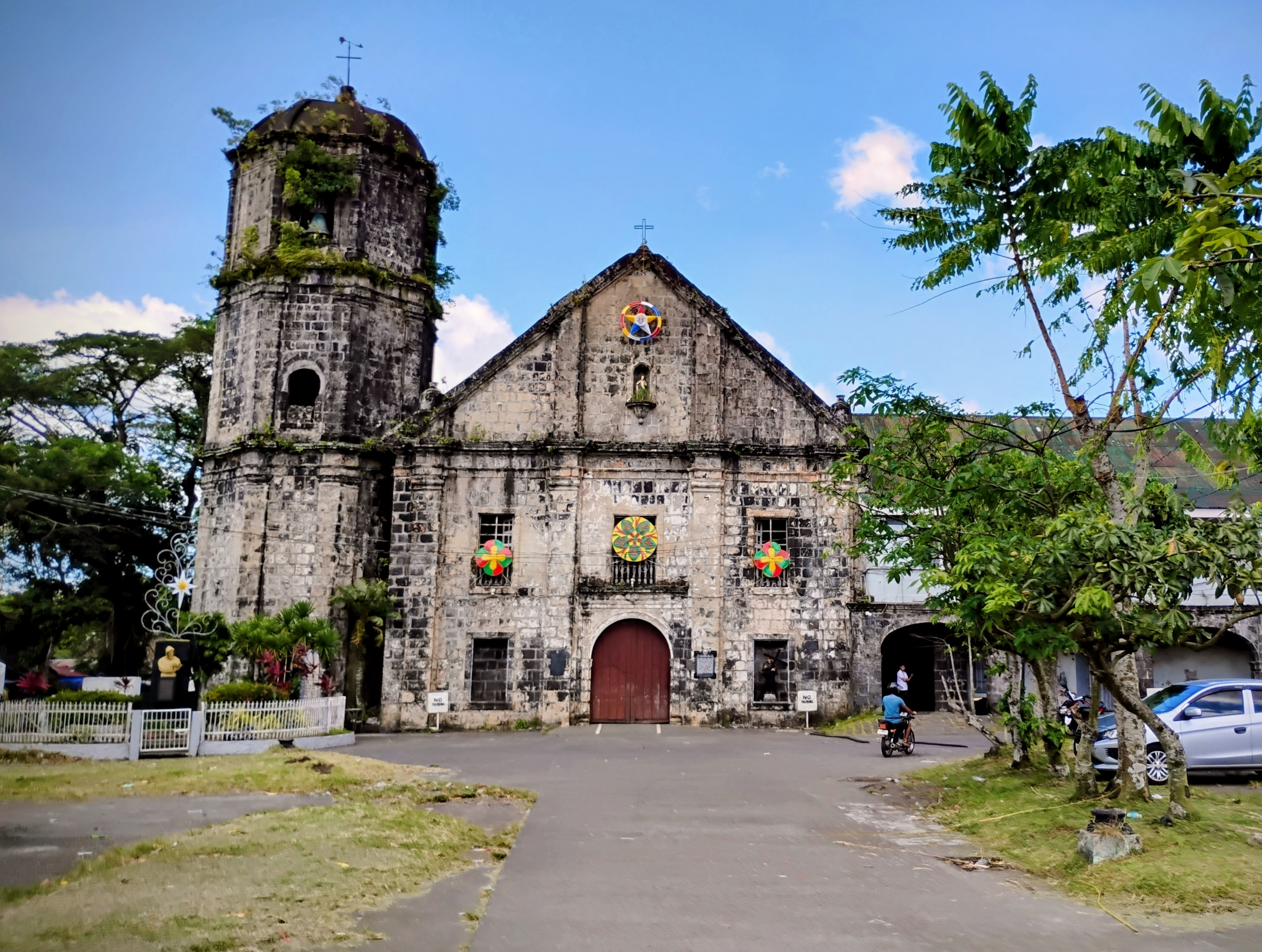
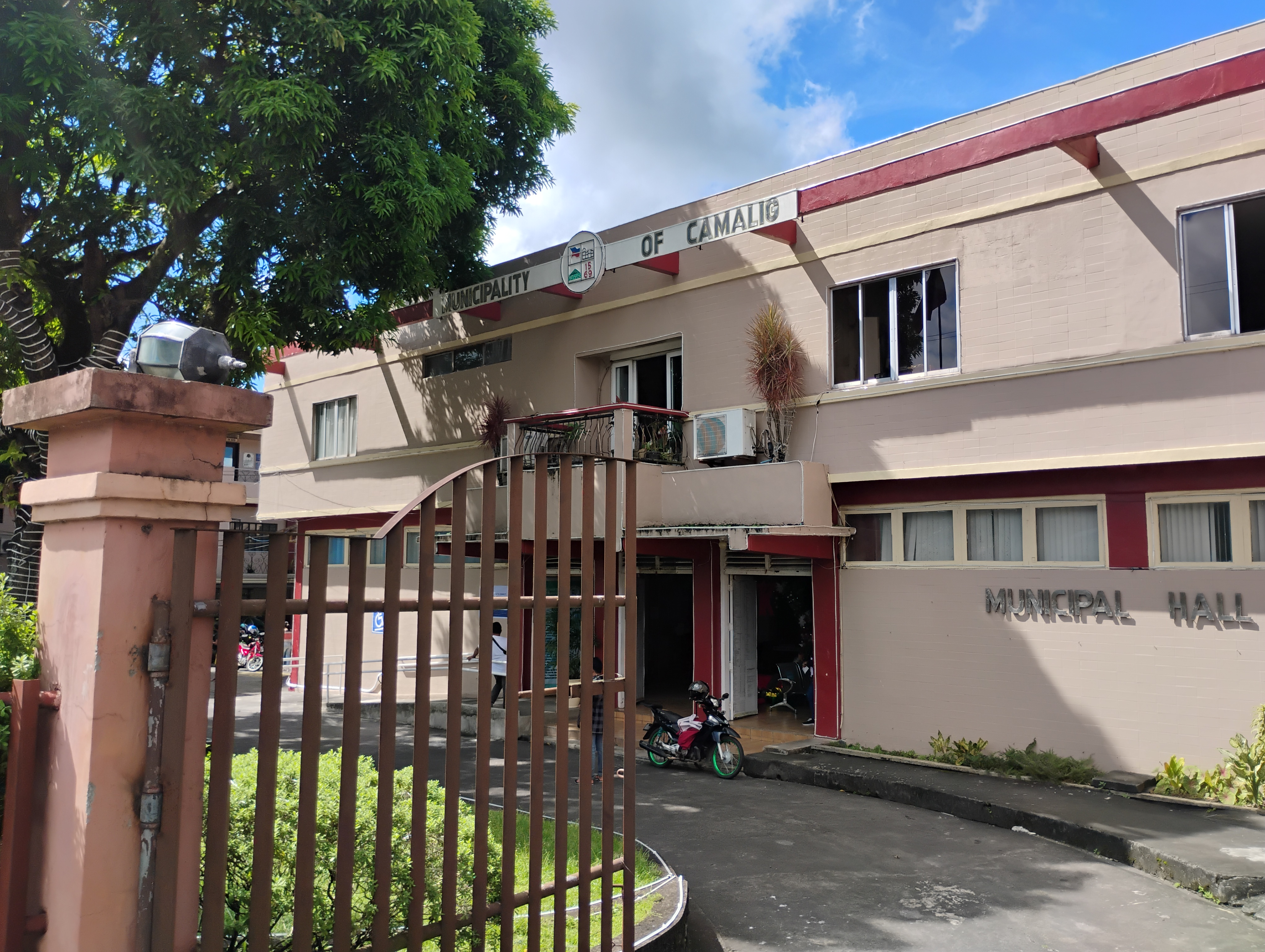
- Camalig Bypass Road Saint John the Baptist Parish Church Camalig Municipal Hall

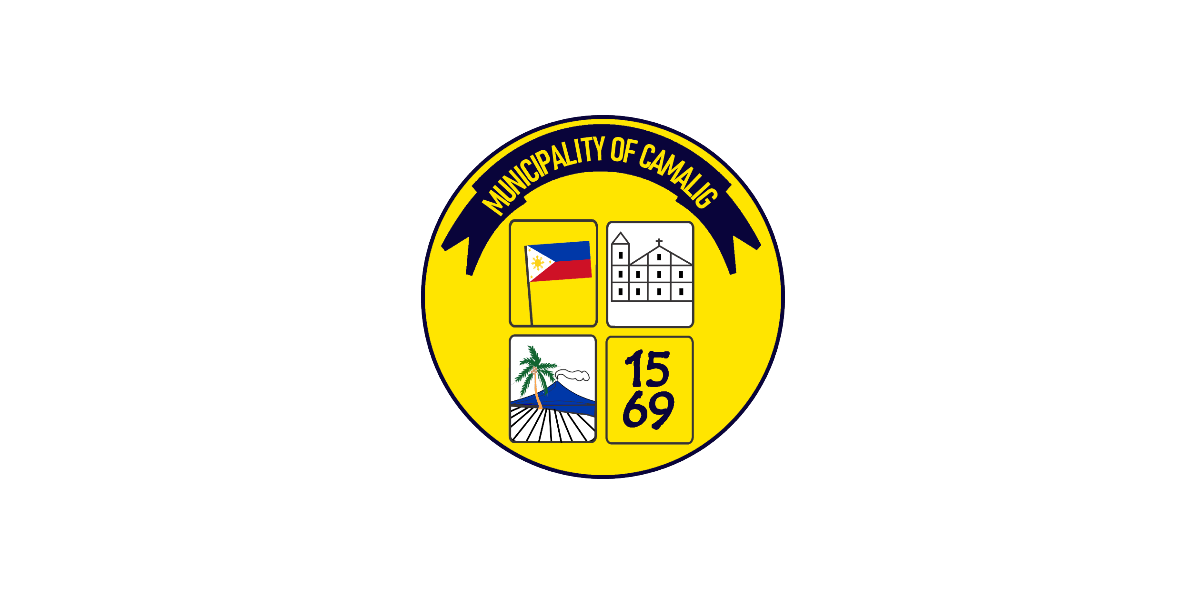
- Flag Seal

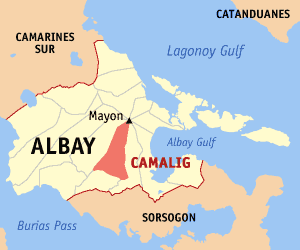
- Map of Albay with Camalig highlighted
- Interactive map of Camalig
- Location within the Philippines
- Coordinates: 13°08′N 123°40′E
- Country: Philippines
- Region: Bicol Region
- Province: Albay
- District: 2nd district
- Barangays: 50 (see Barangays)

Government
  - Type: Sangguniang Bayan
  - Mayor: Carlos Irwin G. Baldo Jr.
  - Vice Mayor: Maria Ahrdail G. Baldo
  - Representative: Carlos A. Loria
  - Municipal Council: Members: Purisima Victoria G. Nocedo; Gilbert E. Vibar; Noel G. Muñoz; Gina M. Nuarin; Vicente M. Manlangit III; Jesus N. Malto; Vicente O. Moyo; Rodolfo S. Llosala Jr.
  - Electorate: 47,648 voters (2025)

Area
  - Total: 130.90 km^{2} (50.54 sq mi)
- Elevation: 202 m (663 ft)
- Highest elevation: 770 m (2,530 ft)
- Lowest elevation: 58 m (190 ft)

Population (2024 census)
  - Total: 73,087
  - Density: 558.34/km^{2} (1,446.1/sq mi)
  - Households: 17,031

Economy
  - Income class: 1st municipal income class
  - Poverty incidence: 25.98% (2023)
  - Revenue: ₱ 313 million (2024)
  - Assets: ₱ 1,371 million (2024)
  - Expenditure: ₱ 360.4 million (2024)
  - Liabilities: ₱ 276.9 million (2024)

Service provider
  - Electricity: Albay Electric Cooperative (ALECO)
- Time zone: UTC+8 (PST)
- ZIP code: 4502
- PSGC: 0500502000
- IDD : area code: +63 (0)52
- Native languages: Central Bikol; Tagalog
- Major religions: Christianity
- Feast date: June 24
- Catholic diocese: Diocese of Legazpi
- Patron saint: St. John the Baptist
- Website: www.camalig.gov.ph

Camalig, officially the Municipality of Camalig (Central Bikol: Banwaan kan Camalig; East Miraya Bikol: Banwaan ning Camalig; Tagalog: Bayan ng Camalig), is a municipality in the province of Albay, Philippines. According to the 2024 census, it has a population of 73,087 people.

== History ==
The 1818 census showed the area had 2,330 native families and 59 Spanish-Filipino families.

In 1952, there was a mass conversion of certain sitios into barrios (now barangays), namely: Anoling, Binanderahan, Cabraran Pequeño, Cabangan, Ilawod, Mabunga, Magogon, Quinuartilan, Solong, and Sumlang.

== Government ==
=== Elected officials ===
2022–2025 Camalig Municipal Officials
Position	Name	Party
Mayor	Calos Irwin G. Baldo, Jr. ‹›	PDP
Vice Mayor	Maria Ahrdail G. Baldo ‹›	PDP
Councilors	Purisima Victoria G. Nocedo ‹›	PDP
Councilors	Sheila Marie M. Dino +	Independent
Councilors	Millard M. Moyo +	PDP
Councilors	Rodolfo S. Llosala, Jr. ‹›	PDP
Councilors	Abegail N. Go +	PDP
Councilors	Gilbert E. Vibar ‹›	PDP
Councilors	Sherwin Ian A. Buena +	PDP
Councilors	Noel G. Muñoz ‹›	PDP
Ex Officio Municipal Council Members
ABC President	Dennise Misolania (Cotmon)	Nonpartisan
SK Federation President	Carlos Matthew C. Gamboa (Cabangan)	Nonpartisan

Legend
1. A + indicates that the official is elected for the first term
2. A ♯ indicates that the official is re-elected to a higher position
3. A ‹› indicates that the official is re-elected to the same position

=== Past municipal administrators ===
Spanish Era (1733–1898)
Inclusive years	Gobernadorcillo
1733	Don Julian delos Angeles
1734	Don Juan Bautista
1735	Don Francisco Ingua
1736	Don Alonzo Macaspo
1737 - 1738	Don Juan de Perea
1739	Don Pedro delos Angeles
1740	Don Pedro Diaz
1741	Don Juan Imperial
1742	Don Mateo Hernandez
1743 - 1744	Don Domingo Sanchez
1745	Don Mateo Hernandez
1746	Don Pedro Alonzo Angeles
1747	Don Pedro Sarampote
1748	Don Pedro Diaz de Guadalupe
1749	Don Luis Miranda
1750	Don Roque de Billanoba
1751	Don Luis Francisco Arvina
1752	Don Juan de la Cruz
1753	Don Domingo Buag
1754	Don Francisco Alvares
1755	Don Guillermo San Miguel
1756	Don Pedro Diaz de Guadalupe
1757	Don Guillermo San Miguel
1758	Don Juan de Lagosia
1759	Don Pedro Diaz de Guadalupe
1760	Don Pascual Guiriba
1761	Don Alonzo Vasquez
1762	Don Antonio Perez
1763-1766	Don Ortilano de Buenosaires
1767	Don Domingo Alonso de la Soledad
1768	Don Antonio Taligon
1769	Don Ortilank de Buenosaires
1770	Don Claudio Valdez
1771	Don Diego San Francisco
1772	Don Antonio Miranda
1773	Don Domingo de la Trinidad
1774	Don Francisco de Sepnida
1775	Don Ortilano de Buenosaires
1776	Don Roque Espinosa
1777	Don Pascual de Trinidad
1778	Don Jose Aguilar
1779	Don Ortilano de Buenosaires
1780	Don Francisco de la Torre
1781	Don Juan Manuel de Jesus
1782	Don Regino San Miguel
1783	Don Jose de Sepnida
1784	Don Jose Aguilar
1785	Don Jose Domingo Pacion
1786	Don Feliciano San Buenaventura
1787	Don Jose Aguilar
1788	Don Jose Domingo Pacion
1789	Don Pedro Mariano Ramos
1790	Don Feliciano San Buenaventura
1791	Don Jose Domingo Pacion
1792	Don Francisco de la Torre
1793	Don Pedro Alonso Aguilar
1794	Don Regino San Miguel
1795	Don Pedro Mariano Ramos
1796 - 1797	Don Juan Manuel de Jesus
1798	Don Guillermo Rosario Angeles
1799	Don Alonzo Angeles
1800	Don Pedro Mariano Ramos
1801	Don Francisco Masagka
1802	Don Ramos de la Trinidad
1803	Don Gorgonio San Miguel
1804	Don Pedro Mariano Ramos
1805	Don Pascasio Pedro
1806	Don Santiago de los Reyes
1807	Don Pedro Mariano Ramos
1808	Don Lorenzo de los Angeles
1809	Don Roque de los Santos
1810	Don Gregorio de Presentacion
1811 - 1814	Don Santiago de los Reyes
1815	Don Gregorio de Presentacion
1816	Don Antonio Aguilar
1817	Don Gabriel Mariano
1818	Don Jose Gil Lorino
1819	Don Pedro Pascual Inocencio
1820	Don Feliciano Sanchez
1821	Don Ramos Alcalde
1822	Don Francisco Alvarez
1823	Don Manuel Alcalde
1824	Don Paulino de los Angeles
1825	Don Santiago de los Reyes
1826	Don Pedro Basilio
1827	Don Francisco Epanlito
1828	Don Andres Marquez
1829	Don Venturo Iglesia
1830	Don Santiago de los Reyes
1831	Don Francisco Baltazar
1832	Don Tomas de la Trinidad
1833	Don Domingo Pacion
1834	Don Rodrigo Vibar
1835	Don Paulino de los Angeles
1836	Don Basilio Bernardo
1837	Don Pedro Basilio
1838	Don Silvino de los Reyes
1839	Don Mariano Florencio
1840	Don Basilio de los Angeles
1841	Don Manuel Ramos
1842	Don Jose Genio
1843 - 1844	Don F. Baltazar
1845	Don Paulino de los Angeles
1846	Don Eusebio de Mesa
1847	Don Benito Morata
1848	Don Felipe Evangelista
1849 - 1851	Don Paulino de los Angeles
1852	Don Policarpo Nolasco
1853	Don Fermin Mortiga
1854	Don Paulino de los Angeles
1855	Don Francisco Mortiga
1856	Don Juan Mancera
1857	Don Juan Rafael
1858	Don Domingo Pacion
1859	Don Mateo Vibar
1860	Don Francisco Nasol
1861	Don Juan Nonic Teodora
1862	Don Juan Nasol
1863	Don Manuel Guiriba
1864	Don Alejandro Nogar
1865-1866	Don Ventura Nasol
1867-1868	Don Fermin Mortiga
1869-1870	Don Mateo Vibar
1871-1872	Don Agaton Samson
1873-1874	Don Domingo Navarez
1875-1876	Don Luis Nova
1877-1878	Don Doroteo Moya
1879-1880	Don Guillermo Nerbis
1881-1882	Don Doroteo Nasol
1883-1886	Don Anacleto Solano
1887-1888	Don Macario Samson
1889-1890	Don Guillermo Nieves
1891	Don Pablo Nebis
1892-1894	Don Guillermo Nieves
1895-1896	Don Juan Moratalla
1897-1898	Don Anacleto Solano

Republica Filipina (1898-1901)
Inclusive years	Municipal president	Municipal vice-president
August 14, 1898 - June, 1901	Domingo Valenciano (Appointed by Gen. Emilio Aguinaldo)	

American rule (1900–1941)
Inclusive years	Portrait	Municipal president	Municipal vice-president	Notes
1900 - 1902		Domingo Valenciano		
1902 - 1904		Anacleto Solano		
1905		Domingo Valenciano		
1906 - 1907		Silverio Morco		
1908 - 1909		Martino Guerrero		
1910 – 1912		Nicolas Grageda		
1913 – 1916		Marcelo Samson		
1917 - 1919		Martino Guerrero		
1920 - 1928		Ramon Nasol		
1929 - 1934		Diego Nolasco		
1935 - 1940		Pablo Musa		
1941		Paterno Grageda		

Japanese Occupation (1941–1945)
Inclusive years	Portrait	Municipal Mayor
1941 - 1945		Jose Samson (Japanese Appointed)

Post-War Period (1945–present)
Inclusive years	Portrait	Municipal Mayor	Municipal Vice Mayor	SK Federation President	ABC President	Remarks
September 29, 1945 – June 13, 1946		Paterno Grageda	Alfonso Moral			Acting Mayor, Appointed by Pres. Sergio Osmeña
June 14, 1946 – 1948		Rafael Grageda				Appointed by Pres. Manuel Roxas
1949 – December 30, 1960		Engracio Vibar				
January 1, 1961 – December 30, 1964		Lauro Monilla				
January 1, 1965 - December 30, 1968		Dr. Mauro S. Nieva	Salvador Mirandilla			
January 1, 1969 - 1972		Wilfredo L. Guerrero	Salvador M. Moyo			
1972 - 1986		Dr. Florencio Muñoz				
1986 - June 30, 1998		Dr. Florencio Muñoz				
June 30, 1998 – June 30, 2004		Paz G. Muñoz				
June 30, 2004 – June 30, 2007		Rommel G. Muñoz				
June 30, 2007 – June 30, 2016		Carlos Irwin G. Baldo, Jr.				
June 30, 2016 - June 30, 2019		Maria Ahrdail G. Baldo	Carlos Irwin G. Baldo, Jr.			
June 30, 2019 – June 30, 2025		Carlos Irwin G. Baldo, Jr.	Maria Ahrdail G. Baldo			

== Geography ==
According to the Philippine Statistics Authority, the municipality has a land area of 130.90 square kilometres (50.54 sq mi) constituting 5.08% of the 2,575.77-square-kilometre (994.51 sq mi) total area of Albay.

Camalig is 12 kilometres (7.5 mi) from Legazpi City and 515 kilometres (320 mi) from Manila.

=== Barangays ===
Camalig is politically subdivided into 50 barangays. Each barangay consists of puroks and some have sitios.

PSGC	Barangay	Population			±% p.a.	
		2024		2010		
050502001	Anoling	1.3%	964	968	▾	−0.03%
050502002	Baligang	4.6%	3,389	3,286	▴	0.21%
050502003	Bantonan	0.8%	586	596	▾	−0.12%
050502046	Barangay 1 (Poblacion)	1.5%	1,086	828	▴	1.88%
050502047	Barangay 2 (Poblacion)	0.6%	407	441	▾	−0.55%
050502048	Barangay 3 (Poblacion)	0.7%	534	603	▾	−0.83%
050502049	Barangay 4 (Poblacion)	0.4%	316	371	▾	−1.10%
050502050	Barangay 5 (Poblacion)	0.5%	361	389	▾	−0.51%
050502051	Barangay 6 (Poblacion)	0.5%	385	386	▾	−0.02%
050502052	Barangay 7 (Poblacion)	0.5%	401	483	▾	−1.27%
050502004	Bariw	2.8%	2,047	1,870	▴	0.62%
050502006	Binanderahan	0.8%	583	554	▴	0.35%
050502007	Binitayan	0.8%	590	564	▴	0.31%
050502009	Bongabong	1.2%	865	917	▾	−0.40%
050502010	Cabagñan	3.9%	2,820	2,682	▴	0.35%
050502011	Cabraran Pequeño	1.2%	852	820	▴	0.26%
050502053	Caguiba	2.1%	1,566	1,536	▴	0.13%
050502012	Calabidongan	1.0%	717	739	▾	−0.21%
050502013	Comun	2.3%	1,704	1,547	▴	0.67%
050502014	Cotmon	3.8%	2,750	2,507	▴	0.64%
050502015	Del Rosario (Namurubaybay)	1.2%	842	824	▴	0.15%
050502016	Gapo	2.3%	1,665	1,565	▴	0.43%
050502017	Gotob	0.9%	635	647	▾	−0.13%
050502018	Ilawod	3.8%	2,807	2,684	▴	0.31%
050502019	Iluluan	2.2%	1,631	1,293	▴	1.61%
050502021	Libod	4.4%	3,233	3,067	▴	0.36%
050502022	Ligban	1.0%	714	707	▴	0.07%
050502023	Mabunga	0.2%	137	102	▴	2.05%
050502024	Magogon	0.8%	566	670	▾	−1.15%
050502025	Manawan	1.2%	879	833	▴	0.37%
050502026	Maninila	1.5%	1,085	984	▴	0.67%
050502027	Mina	0.9%	651	627	▴	0.26%
050502028	Miti	1.3%	926	893	▴	0.25%
050502029	Palanog	4.3%	3,148	2,773	▴	0.88%
050502030	Panoypoy	1.8%	1,304	1,329	▾	−0.13%
050502031	Pariaan	1.2%	863	770	▴	0.79%
050502032	Quinartilan	1.3%	924	887	▴	0.28%
050502033	Quirangay	3.7%	2,721	2,610	▴	0.29%
050502034	Quitinday	0.4%	259	274	▾	−0.39%
050502035	Salugan	2.4%	1,750	1,688	▴	0.25%
050502036	Solong	0.6%	433	488	▾	−0.82%
050502037	Sua	1.9%	1,377	1,321	▴	0.29%
050502038	Sumlang	2.8%	2,025	1,814	▴	0.76%
050502039	Tagaytay	7.7%	5,652	5,029	▴	0.81%
050502040	Tagoytoy	0.8%	620	684	▾	−0.67%
050502041	Taladong	2.1%	1,547	1,549	▾	−0.01%
050502042	Taloto	1.4%	998	1,038	▾	−0.27%
050502043	Taplacon	1.6%	1,181	1,202	▾	−0.12%
050502044	Tinago	2.8%	2,072	1,993	▴	0.27%
050502045	Tumpa	1.8%	1,336	1,153	▴	1.02%
	Total		73,087	63,585	▴	0.96%

=== Climate ===
Climate data for Camalig, Albay
Month	Jan	Feb	Mar	Apr	May	Jun	Jul	Aug	Sep	Oct	Nov	Dec	Year
Mean daily maximum °C (°F)	26 (79)	26 (79)	28 (82)	29 (84)	30 (86)	29 (84)	29 (84)	29 (84)	28 (82)	28 (82)	27 (81)	26 (79)	28 (82)
Mean daily minimum °C (°F)	22 (72)	21 (70)	22 (72)	23 (73)	24 (75)	24 (75)	24 (75)	24 (75)	24 (75)	24 (75)	23 (73)	22 (72)	23 (74)
Average precipitation mm (inches)	138 (5.4)	83 (3.3)	74 (2.9)	50 (2.0)	108 (4.3)	165 (6.5)	202 (8.0)	165 (6.5)	190 (7.5)	186 (7.3)	188 (7.4)	183 (7.2)	1,732 (68.3)
Average rainy days	16.8	11.9	13.5	13.8	20.5	25.2	27.4	26.2	26.1	24.7	20.7	18.5	245.3
Source: Meteoblue (Use with caution: this is modeled/calculated data, not measured locally.)

== Demographics ==
Population census of Camalig
Year	Pop.	±% p.a.
1903	14,153	—
1918	19,772	+2.25%
1939	22,230	+0.56%
1948	25,045	+1.33%
1960	32,002	+2.06%
1970	38,946	+1.98%
1975	41,702	+1.38%
1980	46,040	+2.00%
1990	49,975	+0.82%
1995	53,129	+1.15%
2000	58,141	+1.95%
2007	60,319	+0.51%
2010	63,585	+1.94%
2015	66,904	+0.97%
2020	72,042	+1.57%
2024	73,087	+0.35%
Source: Philippine Statistics Authority

In the 2024 census, Camalig had a population of 73,087 people. The population density was 560 inhabitants per square kilometre (1,500/sq mi).

== Economy ==
Poverty incidence of Camalig (%)

Source: Philippine Statistics Authority

== Culture ==
The municipality offers its finest delicacy locally called Pinangat, a Bicolano food delicacy made primarily of taro leaves. With this reputation, the town hosts the Pinangat Festival annually in June, showcasing the delicacy itself.

== Education ==
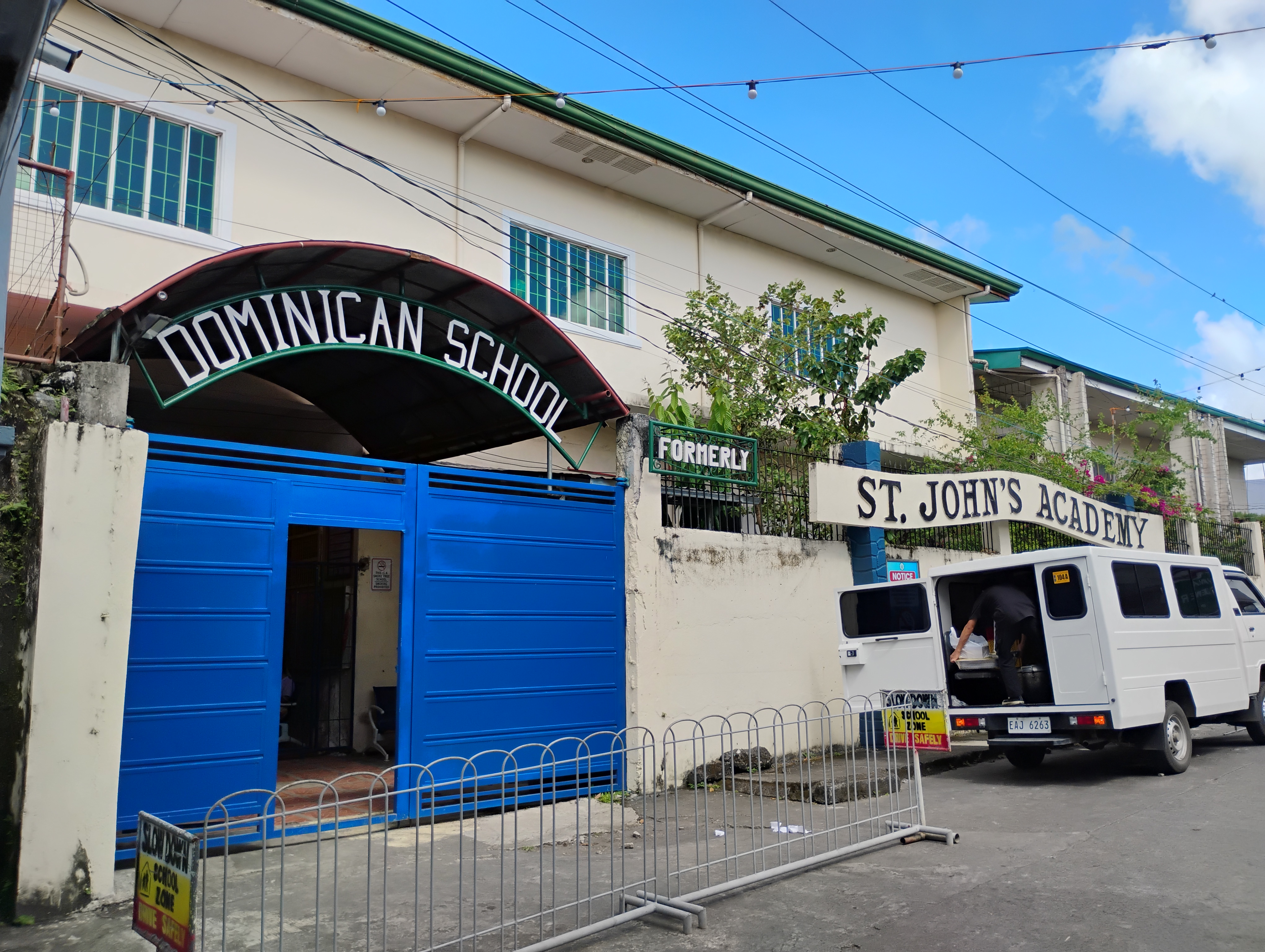
Dominican School

There are two schools district offices which govern all educational institutions within the municipality. They oversee the management and operations of all private and public, from primary to secondary schools. These are the:

- Camalig North Schools District
- Camalig South Schools District

=== Primary and elementary schools ===
- Anoling Elementary School
- Baligang Elementary School
- Baligang SDA Multigrade School
- Bantonan Elementary School
- Bariw Elementary School
- Binanderahan Elementary School
- Cabangan Elementary School
- Cabraran Pequeno Elementary School
- Caguiba Elementary School
- Calabidongan Elementary School
- Camalig North Central School
- Camalig South Central School
- Comun Elementary School
- Cotmon Elementary School
- Del Rosario Elementary School
- Dominican School
- Gotob Elementary School
- Iluluan Elementary School
- Kinuartilan Elementary School
- Libod Elementary School
- Magogon Elementary School
- Manawan Elementary School
- Maninila Elementary School
- Miti Elementary School
- Palanog Elementary School
- Panoypoy Elementary School
- Pariaan Elementary School
- Quirangay Elementary School
- Solong Elementary School
- Tagaytay Elementary School
- Tagoytoy Elementary School
- Taladong Elementary School
- Taloto Elementary School
- Taplacon Elementary School
- Tumpa Elementary School

=== Secondary schools ===
- Bariw National High School
- Caguiba National High School
- Cotmon National High School
- Ilawod High School
- Panoypoy High School
- Pariaan National High School

== Notable personalities ==
- Domingo Samson – propagandist; Governor of Albay (1908–12)
- Justino Nuyda – zarzuela playwright and congressman

== Gallery ==
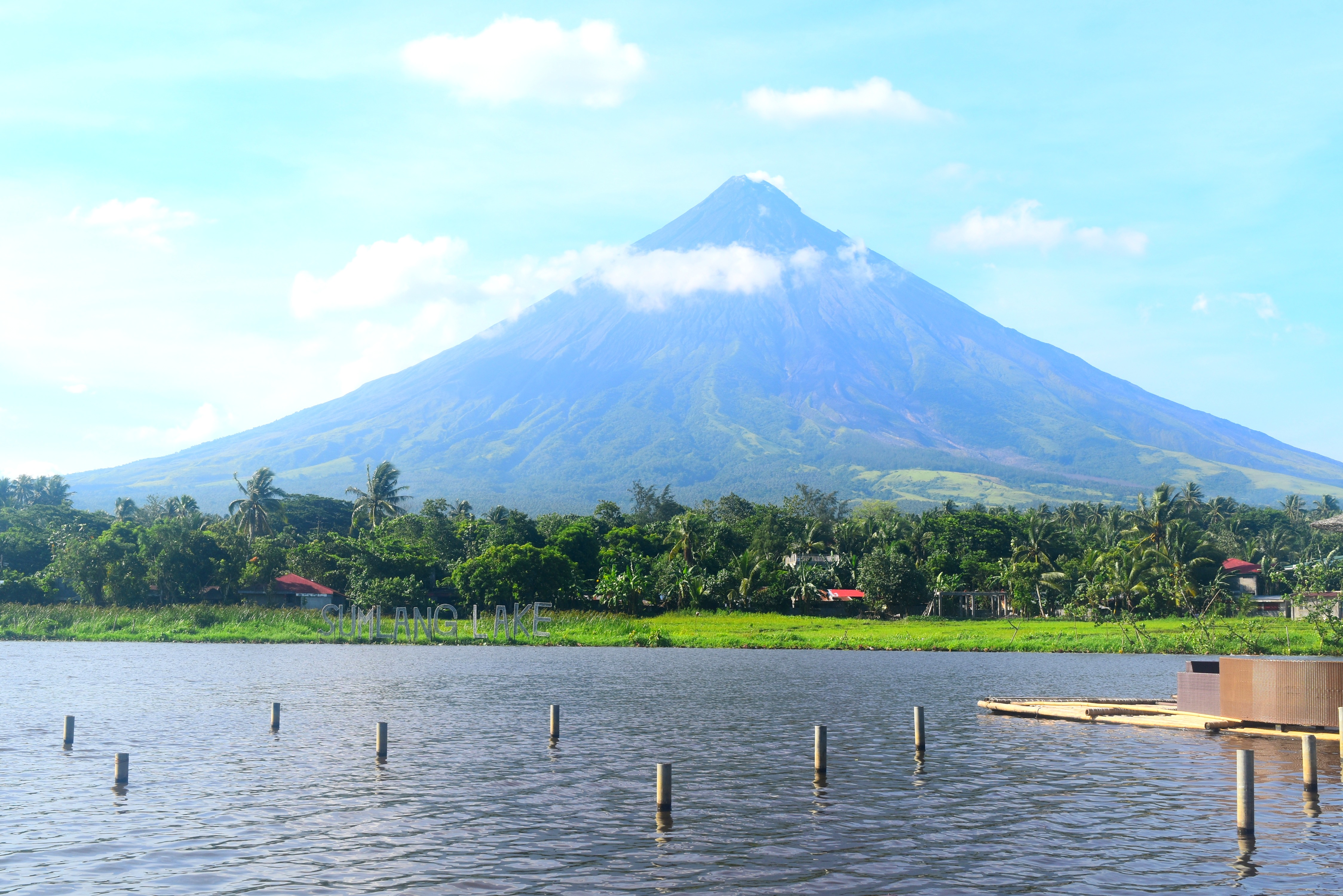
Sumlang Lake

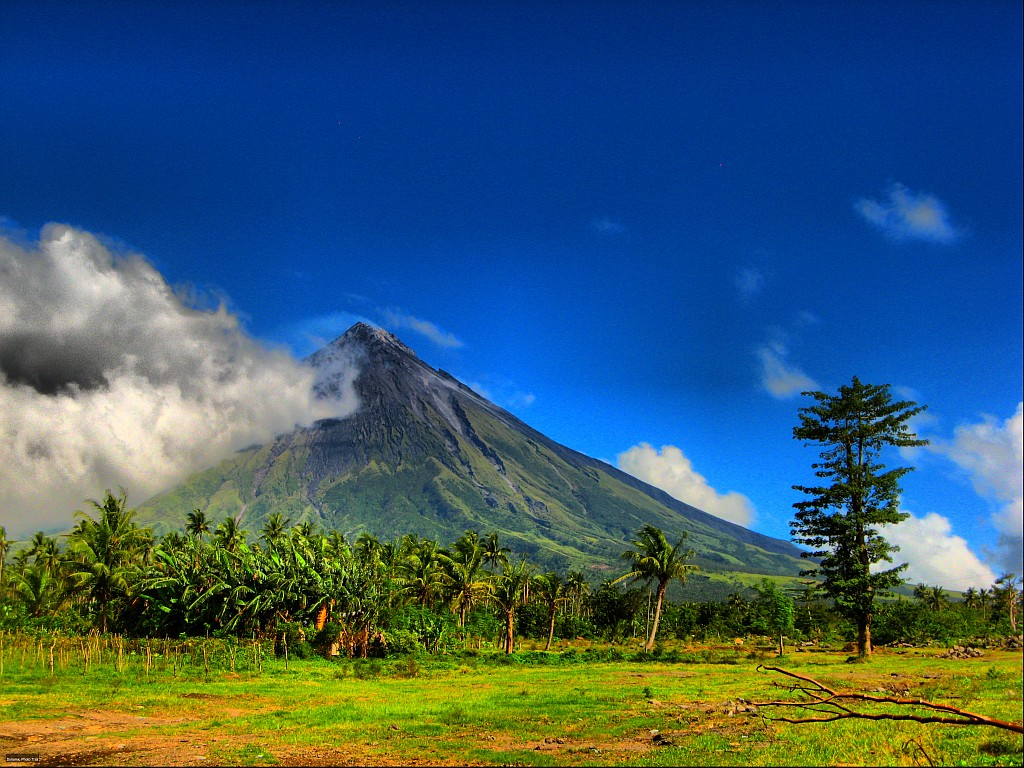
Mayon Volcano seen from Camalig

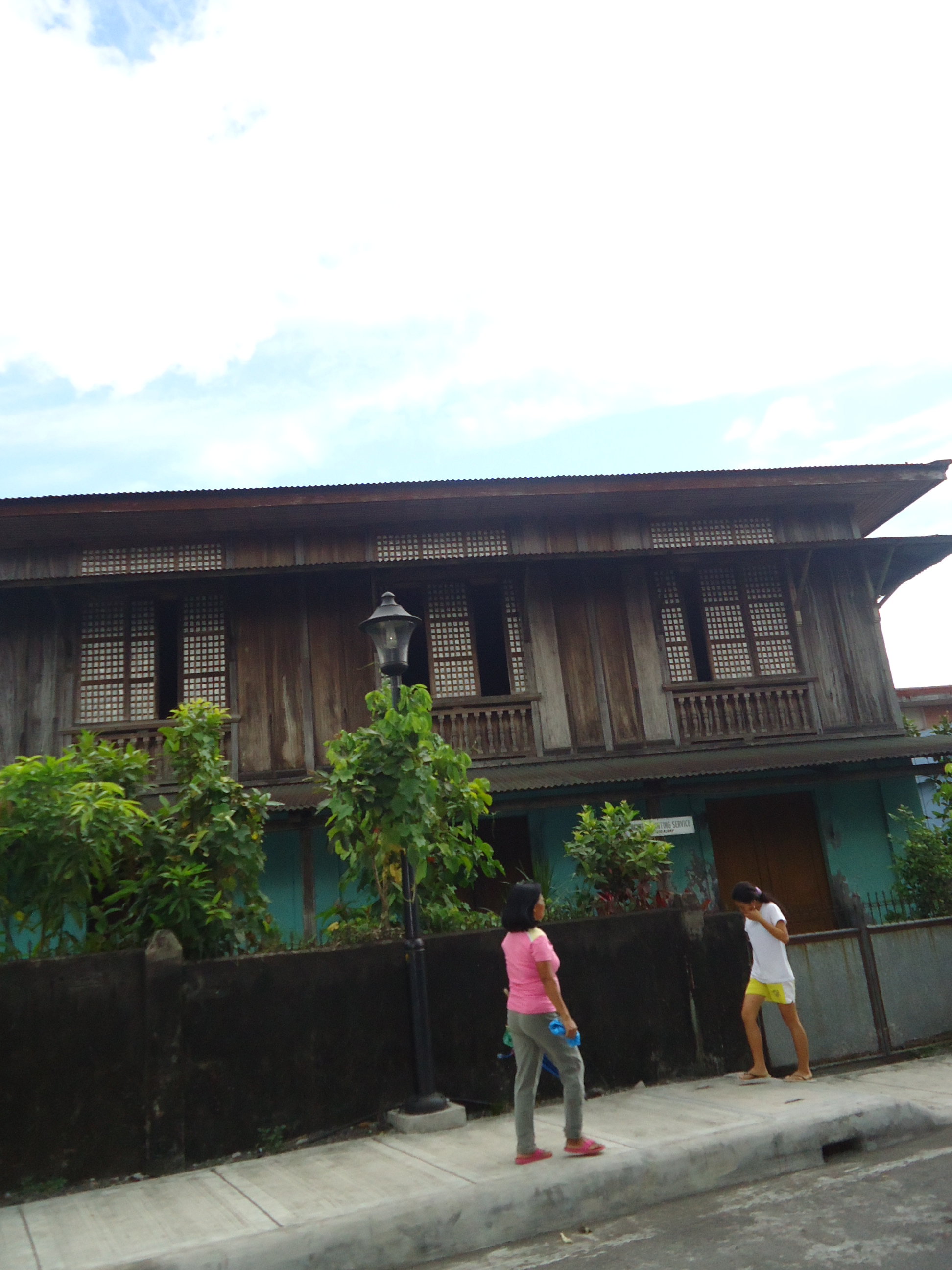
An antique house
