= Castle Creek =

Castle Creek may refer to one of the following:

== Australia ==
- Castle Creek, Queensland, a locality in the Shire of Banana
- Castle Creek, Victoria, a locality in the City of Wodonga

== Canada ==
- Castle Creek (Fraser River), near McBride, British Columbia

== United States ==
- Castle Creek (Arizona), a hot spring and the location of the Castle Hot Springs resort
- Castle Creek (Roaring Fork River tributary), a stream in Pitkin County, Colorado
- Castle Creek (Hyco River tributary), a stream in Person County, North Carolina
- Castle Creek (Rogue River tributary), a stream in Oregon
- Castle Creek (Austin, Texas) - Music Venue
- Castle Creek (South Dakota), a tributary of Rapid Creek in western South Dakota
- Castle Creek (Grand County, Utah) near Moab, tributary of the Colorado River
- Castle Creek (Virginia) in Isle of Wight County, Virginia
- Castle Creek (Washington) on Mount St. Helens
- Castle Creek, New York, a hamlet north of Binghamton, New York

== Other ==
- Castle Creek, band on Roulette Records who sang "I Can Make It Better"
