= Goa, Camarines Sur =

Municipality in Camarines Sur, Philippines

Goa
- Municipality
- Municipality of Goa
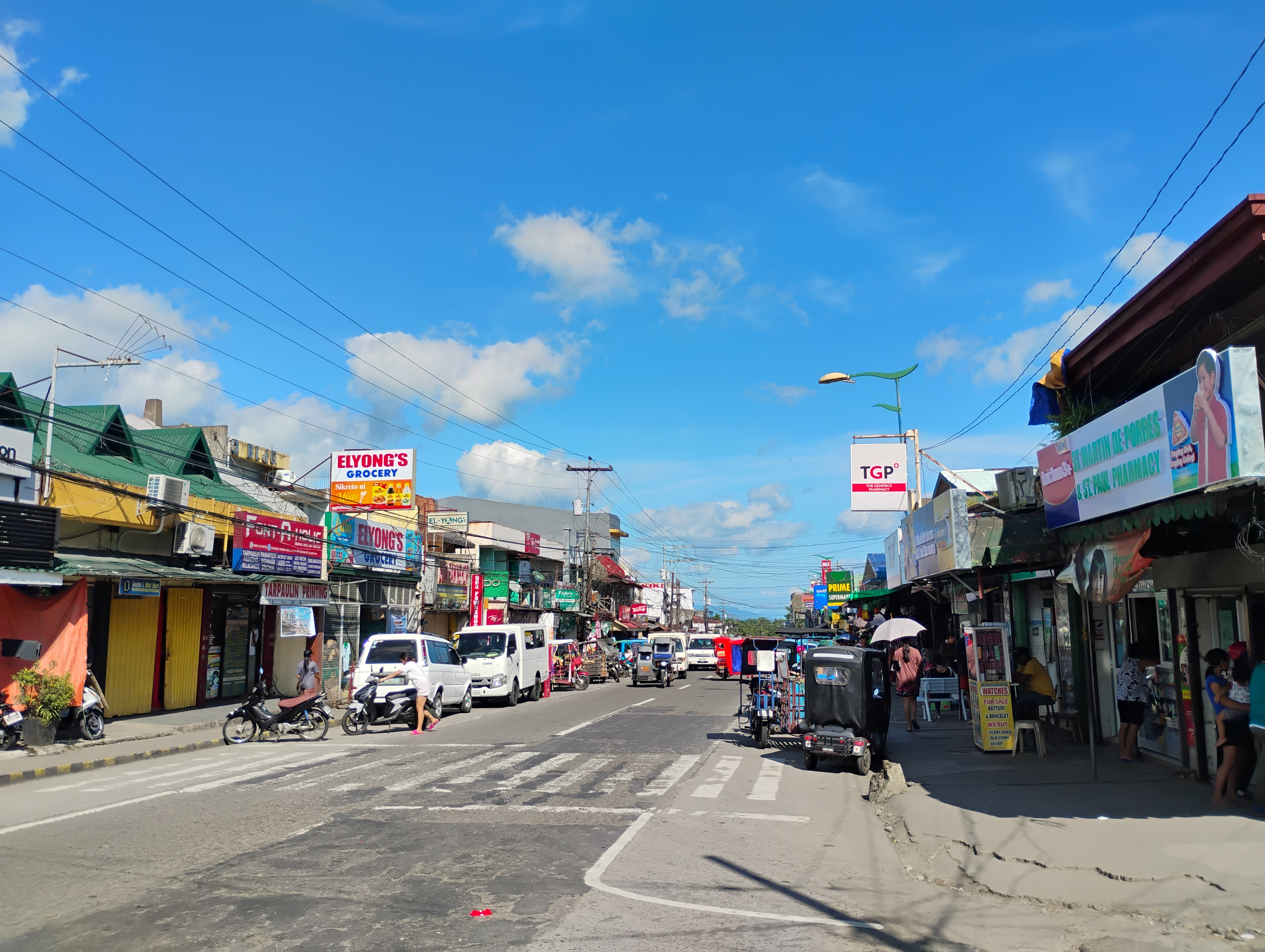
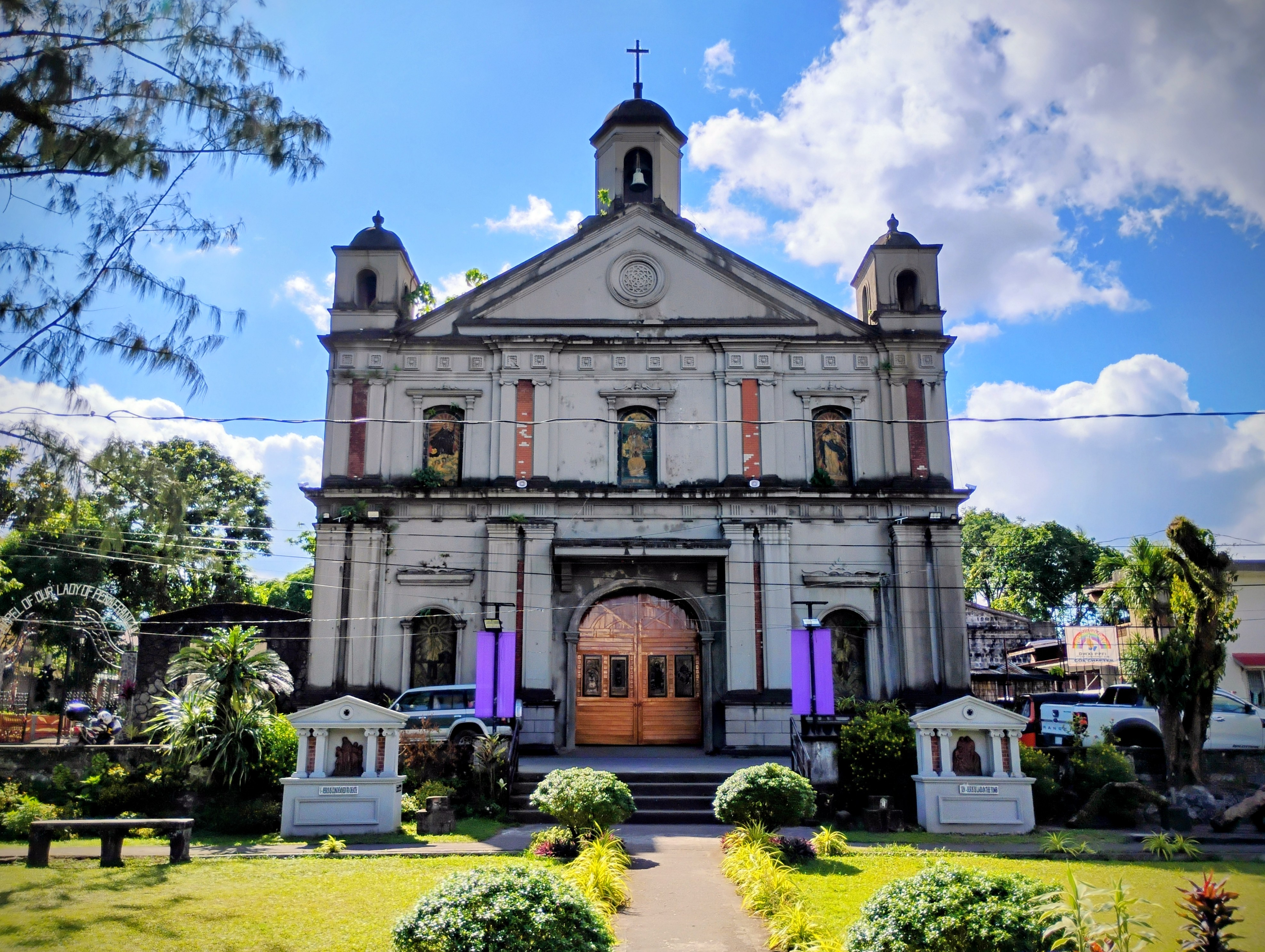
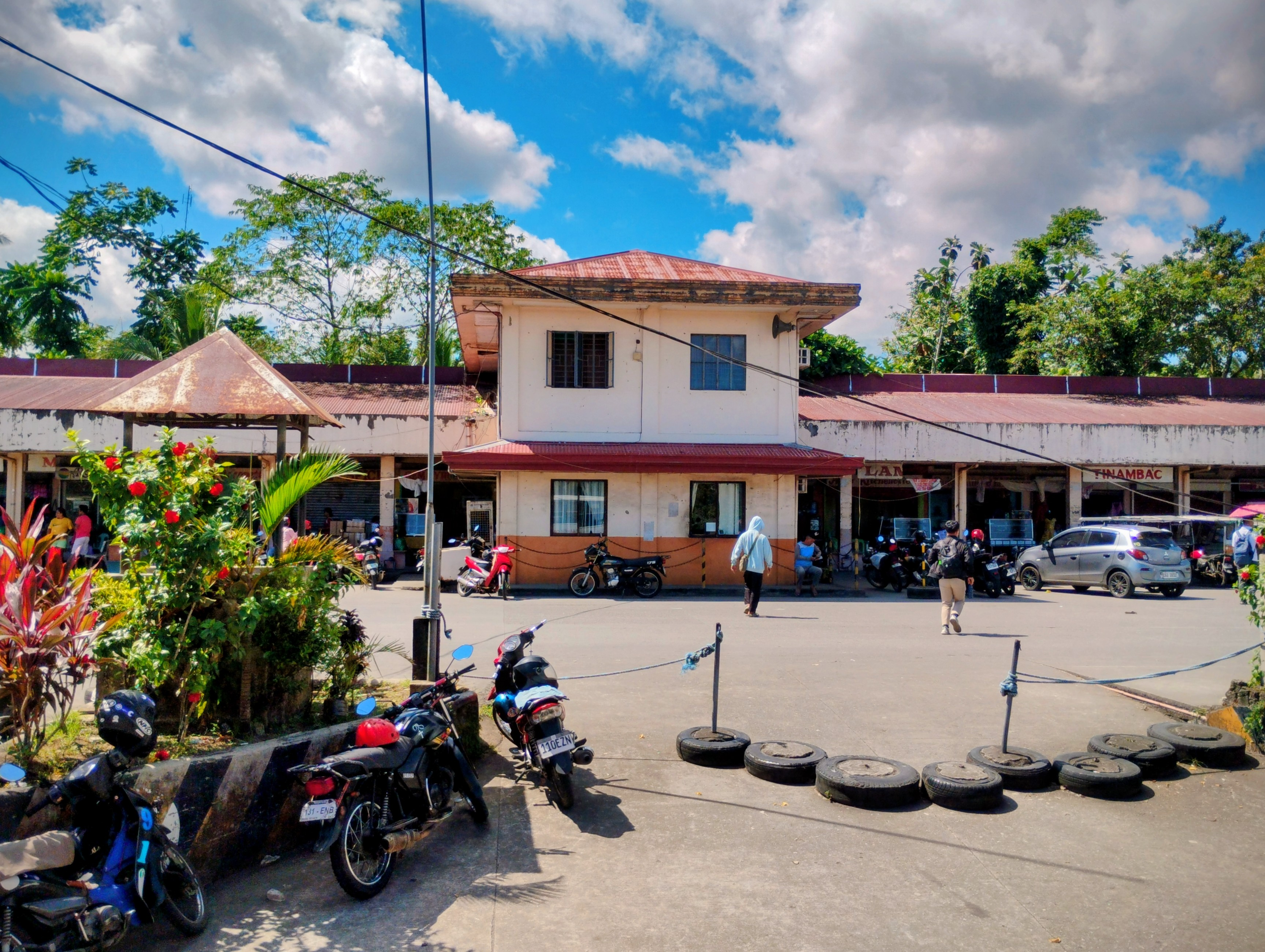
- Goa Town Proper Saint John the Baptist Parish Church Goa Integrated Central Terminal

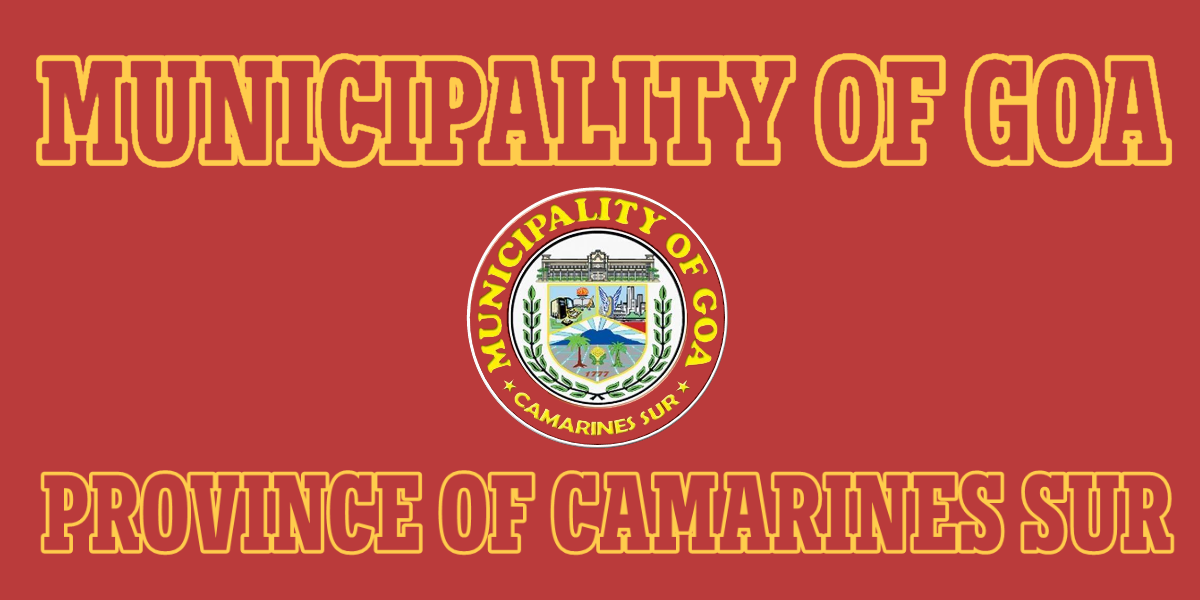
- Flag

- Map of Camarines Sur with Goa highlighted
- Interactive map of Goa
- Location within the Philippines
- Coordinates: 13°41′54″N 123°29′20″E
- Country: Philippines
- Region: Bicol Region
- Province: Camarines Sur
- District: 4th district
- Founded: 1777
- Barangays: 34 (see Barangays)

Government
  - Type: Sangguniang Bayan
  - Mayor: Raquel S. Lim
  - Vice Mayor: Marcel Michael P.Pan
  - Representative: Arnulf Bryan B. Fuentebella
  - Municipal Council: Members: Antolin P. Respall; Hanna-Len I. Broqueza; Ganit Atole; Pinky A. Puntual; Ruby P. Pan; Andy Rivero; Ely B. Cariño; Protacio P. Pena,Jr.
  - Electorate: 42,758 voters (2025)

Area
  - Total: 206.18 km^{2} (79.61 sq mi)
- Elevation: 91 m (299 ft)
- Highest elevation: 388 m (1,273 ft)
- Lowest elevation: 6 m (20 ft)

Population (2024 census)
  - Total: 71,651
  - Density: 347.52/km^{2} (900.06/sq mi)
  - Households: 15,663

Economy
  - Income class: 1st municipal income class
  - Poverty incidence: 28.75% (2023)
  - Revenue: PHP ₱ 345.8 million (2024)
  - Assets: ₱ 958.3 million (2024)
  - Expenditure: ₱ 310.2 million (2024)
  - Liabilities: ₱ 325.7 million (2024)

Service provider
  - Electricity: Camarines Sur 4 Electric Cooperative (CASURECO 4)
- Time zone: UTC+8 (PST)
- ZIP code: 4422
- PSGC: 0501715000
- IDD : area code: +63 (0)54
- Native languages: Central Bikol; Tagalog
- Website: www.goa.gov.ph

Goa, officially the Municipality of Goa (Central Bikol: Banwaan kan Goa; Tagalog: Bayan ng Goa), is a municipality in the province of Camarines Sur, Philippines. According to the 2024 census, it has a population of 71,651 people.

== History ==
The history of Goa, Camarines Sur is closely linked to the eruptive activity of Isarog Volcano and its associated hazards. Geological evidence suggests that around 2,000 years ago, a breach in the volcano’s crater led to the sudden drainage of its crater lake, generating a lake breakout flood that affected downstream communities. In the 12th century, an eruption of Isarog Volcano emplaced block and ash flow that buried settlements near Culasi River, significantly altering the landscape and impacting early inhabitants.

Early communities were established in what is now Barangay Salog, then known as the Visita de Salog, which included the barrios of Lalud (present-day Barangay Salog), Himagaan, Matacla, and Payatan. Lalud, located along the banks of the Cagaycay River, was about five kilometers from the present town center.

The "Visita" was established in 1701 by Franciscan Missionary Fr. Matias de Valdesoto and was attached to the parish of Manguiring, Calabanga. By 1729, it was declared independent and was later converted into a pueblo. The settlement center was later transferred to the present site because a disastrous flood swept the houses down the river and the inhabitants needed more land for planting. The original settlers found in the new site a wide stretch of plain land with brooks and rivers. There were scattered areas of swampland where 'gajo, a native slender cane plant the locals used for arrow shafts, grow in wild profusion.

In 1777, Franciscan Friar Fr. Juan Abalay, from the Portuguese colony of Goa, came to administer the parish. It was on his arrival that the village was converted into a town with the official name of Pueblo de Goa. Fr. Abalay was instrumental in naming the town Goa, motivated presumably for two reasons: to perpetuate the memory of his birthplace and to give official confirmation to the name that the place has been known for some time corrupted allegedly by the Spaniards from "gajo".

On arrival, Fr. Abalay found Gregorio de los Reyes as Pueblo Headman and Santiago Evangelista, Juan de los Santos, Pedro Paraiso, Francisco Jacinto, Andres de la Trinidad and Lucas Delfin as council members. Fr. Abalay named Pedro de los Reyes son of the reigning Headman, “Cabeza de Barangay” in the cabeseria De Barangay del Pueblo De Goa. The German traveler, Feodor Jagor, found Goa a thriving municipality in 1863 when he scouted for guides who could accompany him climb Mount Isarog. In about the same year, the parish started the gigantic project of building a stone church and convent. The church, of Roman Gothic design and the convent, half stone and half wood, were completed in 1887. It took almost two decades of hard labor and involved every man, woman and child who was old enough to carry a piece of stone (known as cellar) to finish the project. A school building of stone was constructed soon across the street on the right side of the convent, to house the classes of the “Primera Enseñanza”. Another structure of the Segunda Enseñanza was added about the time the Revolution broke out in 1896.

For the duration of the revolution and until the arrival of the Americans in 1900, Goa was governed by a local detachment of the revolutionary forces. The inhabitants called this period “Gobierno Filipino”. They elected the first “Presidente” upon the implementation of the Maura Law. Jose Perfecto, headed the civil authorities with the “Cabezas de Barangay”, the past “Capitanes Municipales” serving as the local town council.

Laureano Pan was the first to serve as the local executive (1901-1903) in Goa during the American occupation. The establishment of the first American school was hastened by the unexpected capture of “Commandante” Faustino Perfecto, in-charge of a contingent of KKK troops stationed at Panagan River, by the American troops on the road to Naga. The American school opened in 1902 with Samuel D. Broadley as the supervising teacher. The first three American teachers were Stickney, Cappage, and Tabor, a colored American. Evidently, the Americans realized as early as then, the strategic location and prominence of the town in Partido area. From 1904 up to the end of the decade, Goa was one of only four places in Ambos Camarines with intermediate classes up to grade seven. The others were Nueva Caceres (Naga City), Daet and Iriga. The national road connecting Goa to Naga via Anayan was constructed in 1917. It was also in 1917 when the construction of the Municipal Hall was started which was completed in 1922. With the first automobile that traveled the Naga-Partido road, modernization slowly flowed in. In 1925, Jose Centenera, installed the first electric generator that lighted the town until the Japanese occupation. In the same year, he also opened a movie house, which featured serialized silent movies. In 1926, Goa had a modern concrete market pavilion and abattoir to replace the old market building.

The traditional Open Market day on Sunday, was initiated in 1945, though this is no longer true today since as the trade and commercial center in the 3rd District of Camarines Sur, every day is already a market day. It was also in 1946 that Goa donated parcels of land to the Province of Camarines Sur for the establishment of Partido High School (converted to Partido National High School, then to Partido State College and now as Partido State University). Telecommunication service by telegraph was provided in 1950. The Goa Civic Square, an open park surrounded by huge acacia trees where the locals of Goa held almost all public activities – from amateur singing contest to political fora, benefit dances, fiesta celebrations, summer basketball competitions, etc., was constructed between 1952 and 1954. Next was the construction of the ABC Building between 1968 and 1971 under ABC President Alberto A. Din. The Camp Jovi Fuentebella in Lamon became the National Jamboree site in 1983. There was a trend of constructing covered basketball courts in majority of the municipalities in the country in the early nineties. By 1993, the Goa Civic Square was converted to become the covered Goa Sports Complex that now exists in front of the Goa Municipal Hall.

On January 30, 1986, Mayor Lorenzo Padua was campaigning for President Ferdinand Marcos during the 1986 Philippine presidential election on his motorcycle when he was assassinated by the unknown gunmen.

== Geography ==
Goa is bounded by the Municipality of Tinambac on the west, Municipalities of Tinambac and Lagonoy on the north, by Municipalities of Tinambac and Tigaon on the south, by Municipalities of San Jose and Lagonoy on the east.

Goa has a total land area of 20,618 hectares (50,950 acres) or about 3.99% of the province' land area. Its distance from the nearest municipality, San Jose, is 3 kilometres (1.9 mi), the Capital Town of Pili is 37 kilometres (23 mi), while Naga City is 52 kilometres (32 mi). Furthermore, Goa's distance from Manila via Daet, Camarines Norte, is about 500 kilometres (310 mi) and via Quirino Highway is approximately 380 kilometres (240 mi).

=== Barangays ===
Goa is politically subdivided into 34 barangays. Each barangay consists of puroks or zones and some have sitios.

Currently, there are 10 of which located within the poblacion/urban area and the remaining are considered rural barangays. The largest barangay is Hiwacloy having an area of 1,818.87 hectares (4,494.5 acres) and the farthest barangay is Tamban which is about 28 kilometres (17 mi) from the poblacion area.

- Abucayan
- Bagumbayan Grande (Poblacion)
- Bagumbayan Pequeño (Poblacion)
- Balaynan
- Belen (Poblacion)
- Buyo
- Cagaycay
- Catagbacan
- Digdigon
- Gimaga
- Halawig-Gogon
- Hiwacloy
- La Purisima (Poblacion)
- Lamon
- Matacla
- Maymatan
- Maysalay
- Napawon
- Panday (Poblacion)
- Payatan
- Pinaglabanan
- Salog
- San Benito (Poblacion)
- San Isidro West
- San Isidro (Poblacion)
- San Jose (Poblacion)
- San Juan Bautista (Poblacion)
- San Juan Evangelista (Poblacion)
- San Pedro (formerly Aroro)
- Scout Fuentebella (West)
- Tabgon
- Tagongtong
- Tamban (Mabini)
- Taytay

=== Climate ===
Climate data for Goa, Camarines Sur
Month	Jan	Feb	Mar	Apr	May	Jun	Jul	Aug	Sep	Oct	Nov	Dec	Year
Mean daily maximum °C (°F)	31 (88)	30 (86)	32 (90)	35 (95)	35 (95)	35 (95)	34 (93)	33 (91)	34 (93)	32 (90)	30 (86)	30 (86)	33 (91)
Mean daily minimum °C (°F)	26 (79)	26 (79)	28 (82)	30 (86)	31 (88)	30 (86)	29 (84)	29 (84)	29 (84)	28 (82)	27 (81)	27 (81)	28 (83)
Average precipitation mm (inches)	82.88 (3.26)	137.93 (5.43)	63.69 (2.51)	78.31 (3.08)	229.42 (9.03)	288.31 (11.35)	280.99 (11.06)	112.39 (4.42)	210.87 (8.30)	599.07 (23.59)	194.80 (7.67)	454.30 (17.89)	2,732.96 (107.59)
Average rainy days	24	28	18	20	24	29	31	27	27	30	29	31	318
Source: World Weather Online

== Demographics ==
Population census of Goa
Year	Pop.	±% p.a.
1903	8,988	—
1918	11,091	+1.41%
1939	13,411	+0.91%
1948	13,487	+0.06%
1960	24,663	+5.16%
1970	32,516	+2.80%
1975	34,049	+0.93%
1980	36,254	+1.26%
1990	39,888	+0.96%
1995	43,206	+1.51%
2000	48,490	+2.50%
2007	54,035	+1.50%
2010	58,503	+2.93%
2015	63,308	+1.51%
2020	71,368	+2.55%
2024	71,651	+0.10%
Source: Philippine Statistics Authority

In the 2024 census, the population of Goa was 71,651 people, with a density of 350 inhabitants per square kilometre or 910 inhabitants per square mile.

While the population of Partido District grew at irregular paces during the decade, Goa has consistently to be the second most highly populated in the district next to Tinambac. In year 2000, the municipality has a population of 48,490 with a 14% share to the district's total population of 341,487. Meanwhile, Tinambac has the highest share of 15% to the district's population which is only a percent higher than of Goa.

In 1995, Partido reached its highest growth rate of 2.58% but it dropped to 1.46% in year 2000. But Goa, on the other hand, showed a consistent average growth rate of 0.96% in 1990, 1.51% in 1995 and the highest rate of 2.50% in 2000. During the 2007 census, the municipality's population ballooned to 54,035.

=== Isarog Agta Language ===
In 2010, UNESCO released its 3rd world volume of Endangered Languages in the World, where 3 critically endangered languages were in the Philippines. One of these languages in the Isarog Agta language which has an estimated speaker of 5 people in the year 2000. The language was classified as Critically Endangered, meaning the youngest speakers are grandparents and older, and they speak the language partially and infrequently and hardly pass the language to their children and grandchildren anymore. If the remaining 150 people do not pass their native language to the next generation of Isarog Agta people, their indigenous language will be extinct within a period of 1 to 2 decades.

The Isarog Agta people live within the circumference of Mount Isarog, though only 5 of them still know their indigenous language. They are one of the original Negrito settlers in the entire Philippines. They belong to the Aeta people classification, but have distinct language and belief systems unique to their own culture and heritage.

=== Prominent people ===
- Mariben Berja - an educator and public school administration official currently the Chief of the Curriculum and Implementation Division of the Schools Division Office of Camarines Sur under the Department of Education, Region V in the Philippines.

== Economy ==
Poverty incidence of Goa (%)

Source: Philippine Statistics Authority

Goa is a bustling commercial center in the Partido area. It has 2 shopping malls LCC Mall and 101 Shopping Center. It has several banks as well.

It has 3 radio stations that broadcast all across Camarines Sur extending to some parts of Camarines Norte, and Albay, The 99.3 Kakampi Partido, 94.5 Favorite Music Radio, 87.7 Brigada News FM.

Due to Goa's geography it has become a commercial center and also a stop for tourists going to Caramoan islands, Partido islands or Catanduanes.

== Infrastructure ==
Goa is accessible from Naga City through a one and half-hour drive along the Fuentebella Highway. Two bus companies including air conditioned vans and jeepneys regularly ply the route to Goa. Jeepneys and trimobiles that convey people and products to and from the poblacion provide access to interior barangays.

All barangays are accessible through regular transportation services. Goa's road system spans a 117.435 kilometres (72.971 mi) network interconnecting the various barangays in the municipality. Presently, it has 26.35 kilometres (16.37 mi) of barangay roads, 54.1 kilometres (33.6 mi) of national roads, 27.35 kilometres (16.99 mi) of provincial roads and 9.36 kilometres (5.82 mi) of municipal roads. Majority of the roads however, are gravel roads (46.84 kilometres (29.11 mi)) particularly those at the barangay level. Meanwhile, 96.91% of the municipal roads are concreted. There are 38 bridges in the municipality with a total length of 435.60 meters. Of which, 74.52% were constructed by the DPWH, 14% by PEO, 9.64% by LGU and 1.84 by barangay administration.

Electricity in Goa is provided by the local electric cooperative (CASURECO IV). In 2001, a total of 7,702 households are connected to the power cooperative energizing the 34 barangays of the municipality, however there still 2,316 households in the rural areas that are dependent on kerosene for lighting purposes

== Government ==
The current municipal mayor is Raquel S. Lim.

== Environment protection ==
Goa's environment sector revolves on two aspects: the forest environment and the urban environment. The protection of the forest environment is presently being handled by the DENR through the Office of the Protected Area Superintendent for Mt. Isarog National Park. The LGU, together with NGO representatives, is a member of the Protected Area Management Board. Such representation ensures Goa's participation in the protection of its portion in Mount Isarog. The urban environment protection is covered by the municipality's Goa Ecological Waste Management Program (GEWAMP) which deals mainly in aspects of solid waste management, pollution control and monitoring of toxic emissions from industries. The GEWAMP is equipped with heavy equipment transport utilities which regularly collect solid waste in commercial areas and urban barangays. The collected garbage is being dumped in a 16-hectare controlled dump site in San Isidro West located 11 kilometers away from the town proper.

== Healthcare ==
Hospitals/Clinics:

- St. John Hospital - San Jose St., Goa, Camarines Sur
- Goa Municipal Infirmary - Barangay Tagongtong (Temporary Location / beside PNP Headquarters)
- Rural Health Unit 1 - Burgos Street, Goa, Camarines Sur
- Sales Maternity Clinic & Lying In - Borja Street, Goa, Camarines Sur
- St. Gerard Majela Lying In Clinic - Halawig-gogon, Goa, Camarines Sur

== Education ==
The Goa Schools District Office governs all educational institutions within the municipality. It oversees the management and operations of all private and public, from primary to secondary schools.

This municipality has different secondary and tertiary schools accredited by the Commission on Higher Education, the Technical Education and Skills Development Authority, the Department of Education, and the Department of Science and Technology. The town of Goa is also the home of the premier high school in the whole Bicol region, the Philippine Science High School Bicol Region Campus at Barangay Tagontong. PSHS-BRC is one of the campuses of the PSHS system.

=== Primary and elementary schools ===
- Abucayan Elementary School
- Arborvitae Plains Montessori
- Aroro Elementary School
- Balaynan Elementary School
- Bicol for Christ Mission Academy
- Buyo Impact Elementary School
- Cagaycay Elementary School
- Catagbacan Elementary School
- Digdigon Elementary School
- Ezer Foundation School
- Gimaga Elementary School
- Goa Central School
- Halawig-Gogon Elementary School
- Hansel & Gretel Foundation
- Hiwacloy Central School
- Instituto De Caceres
- Laki-Laki Elementary School
- Lamon Elementary School
- Lip-ac Integrated School of Goa
- Matacla Elementary School
- Maymatan Central School
- Maysalay Elementary School
- Montessori Children's House of Learning
- Napawon Elementary School
- Payatan Elementary School
- Pinaglabanan Elementary School
- Salog Elementary School
- San Isidro Elementary School
- St. John the Baptist Intergrated School
- St. Paul Academy
- Tabgon Elementary School
- Tagongtong Elementary School
- Tamban Elementary School
- Taytay Elementary School

=== Secondary schools ===
- Felipe-Aniceta Pilapil National High School
- Goa National High School
- Goa Science High School
- Global Site for IT Studies
- Juan L. Filipino Memorial High School
- Lamon National High School
- Lip-ac Integrated School of Goa
- Montessori Children's House of Learning
- New Partido National High School
- Partido College
- Partido State University
- Pastor Bonito Jr. National High School
- Payatan National High School
- Philippine Science High school
- Pinaglabanan National High School
- Rosita Saavedra Narvaez National High School
- St. Paul Academy
- Tabgon National High School
- Visita de Salog High School

=== Higher educational institutions ===
- Fatima School of Science & Technology
- Global Site for IT Studies
- Goa Community College
- Partido College
- Partido State University
- Worldtech Resources Institute

== Media ==
=== Legal FM Radio Stations ===
- 87.7 Brigada News FM Goa
- 94.5 FMR Cam Sur (Philippine Collective Media Corporation)
- 99.3 KM Kakampi Mo.
- 103.3 Partido State University - Campus Radio

=== Radio Communications Group ===
- 144.540 MHz - DX4PR (Partido Enthusiasts Amateur Radio League)
- 164.875 MHz - MDRRMO

[edited by: Ham radio enthusiasts]
