= Lake breakout =

Event causing flooding

Lake breakout is the collapse of a lake, usually of high-altitude. High-altitude lakes tend to form in volcanic craters – where they are called crater lakes – or in valleys dammed as the result of earthquakes or glacial or volcanic deposition. Lake breakouts are most common a few weeks or months after a volcanic eruption as a river becomes blocked by volcanic debris.

== Process ==
The walls of such lakes can be unstable and may be breached after fresh earthquakes or because of erosion. As water rushes outwards, the initial channel is cut wider and deeper, further increasing the flow. This may cause the lake's rim to collapse abruptly. The usual result is for huge amounts of water to be displaced, incorporating a great deal of sediment which increases it in volume by as much as two or four times, or even more. This produces violent floods and lahars with devastating effects for any settlements in their path.

== Historical events ==
The larger a temporary lake is, the more extreme the likely breakout will be. One of the largest known to have occurred in recent geological history was the collapse, around 15,000 years ago, of the ancient Lake Bonneville which was filled with meltwater from the last ice age and covered large areas of Utah, Idaho and Nevada. Erosion broke through the lake shore's lowest point, the Red Rock Pass in Idaho, releasing as much as 1,000 mile^{3} (4,000 km^{3}) of water within a period estimated to have lasted only two weeks. The energies released by the outburst were capable not just of stripping surface features, but gouging out bedrock to a depth of many feet. It drastically reshaped the landscape downstream, carving out many of the features of the Snake River and its surrounding area. Glacial Lake Missoula also had lake breakouts, due to breaking of ice dams, see Missoula Floods. These lake breakouts caused extensive erosion throughout eastern Washington. It has been suggested that gigantic breakouts from underground lakes may have been responsible for carving some of the canyons of Mars.

== Mitigation ==
Although there is little that can be done about many lake breakouts, some have been prevented (or at least delayed) by human intervention. The 1980 eruption of Mount St. Helens blocked nearby Castle Creek, forming a lake which geologists feared would produce a sudden lahar. The United States Army Corps of Engineers excavated an outlet channel which prevented the lake from overtopping its new debris dam.
