= Castle Lake (Washington) =

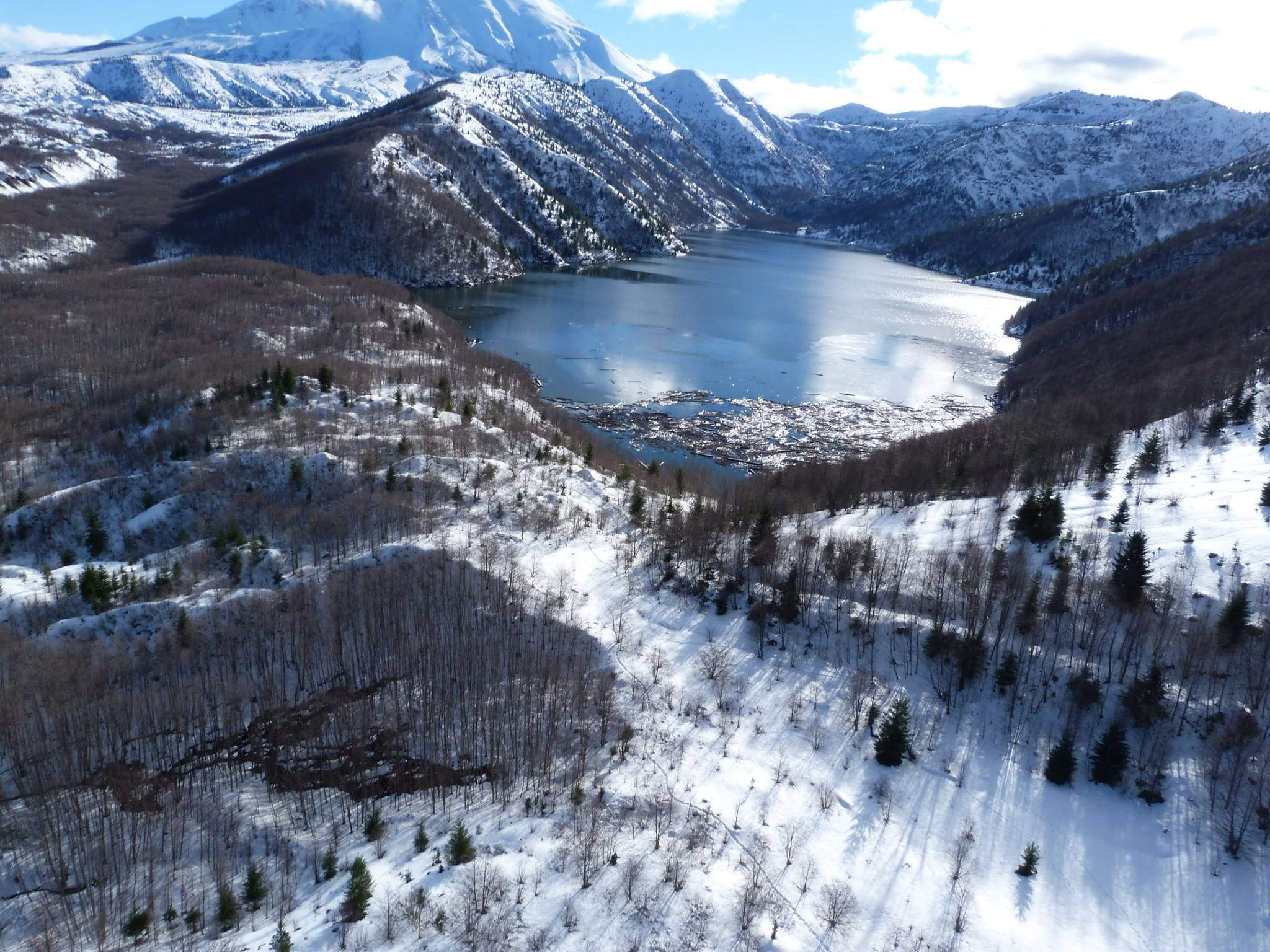
- Castle Lake viewed from the air, February 2016

- Location within Washington (state)
- Location: Cowlitz County, Washington, US
- Coordinates: 46°15′01″N 122°16′30″W
- Type: barrier lake
- Primary inflows: South Fork Castle Creek
- Primary outflows: South Fork Castle Creek
- Catchment area: 3.1 mi^{2} (8 km^{2})
- Basin countries: United States
- Surface area: 257.7 acres (1.043 km^{2})
- Average depth: 62 ft (18.9 m)
- Max. depth: 97.7 ft (29.78 m)
- Water volume: 740,000,000 cu ft (21,000,000 m^{3})
- Surface elevation: 2,595 ft (791 m)

Castle Lake is a barrier lake formed by the May 18, 1980 eruption of Mount St. Helens, when an avalanche dammed the South Fork of Castle Creek. The lake covers just slightly more than 1 square kilometer (0.39 sq mi). In 1981 a spillway was constructed to alleviate concerns about sudden erosion. The lake is difficult to access, but trails have been built to it and recreational fishing is allowed.

== Description ==
Castle Lake is a sub-alpine lake covering an area of just over 1 square kilometer (0.39 sq mi), located 9 kilometers (5.6 mi) northwest of Mount St. Helens. Castle Lake's outflow runs towards Coldwater Lake, another lake newly formed by the eruption. It is surrounded by precipitous ridges consisting of andesitic and dacitic volcanic bedrock.

== History ==
When Mount St. Helens erupted on May 18, 1980, debris from an avalanche measuring 2.5 cubic kilometers blocked South Fork Castle Creek, creating a lake as runoff was impeded by the resulting debris wall which was 20 meters (66 ft) in height. The blockage of Castle Creek measures 610 meters (2,000 ft) long with a mean width of 430 meters (1,410 ft).

The lake filled rapidly during the winter of 1980–1981, and was expected to overflow the blockage in the fall of 1982. However, a subsequent study predicted an earlier overflow, so in October 1981 a spillway 270 meters (890 ft) long and 30 meters (98 ft) wide was constructed to prevent the lake from flowing over the blockage, while at the same time the lake was cleared of the numerous downed trees that were blown into the lake by the eruption explosion. In 1991, rainbow trout appeared in the lake, apparently resulting from the migration of stock introduced to Coldwater Lake a few years earlier. The trout of Castle Lake are a self-perpetuating population, successfully spawning in the streams that feed Castle Lake.

== Recreation ==
Construction started in 1989 on Gifford Pinchot National Forest trail number 221, called the Castle Lake Trail. The trail-head splits from Castle Ridge Trail #216 and runs for 3.9 miles (6.3 km) to Castle Lake. The hiking distance from Toutle, Washington is 18.6 miles (29.9 km). Trout fishing is seasonally accessible and allowed.

== Ecological issues ==
There has been significant concern that despite the spillway construction, the debris blockage that created Castle Lake could erode suddenly, and create a flood posing significant risks to the communities of Castle Rock, Kelso, Longview, and Toutle. In a study conducted by United States Army Corps of Engineers given to the United States Forest Service, the probability of such a breach was considered very low. However, the conditions which created the dam are unprecedented, and therefore little to no historical data exists to support any conclusion regarding stability. The blockage appears to be stable regarding overtopping erosion, but the susceptibility to earthquake or hydrologic events remains undetermined.
