= Castle Creek (Fraser River tributary) =

Stream in British Columbia, Canada

Coordinates: 53°13′35″N 120°02′30″W

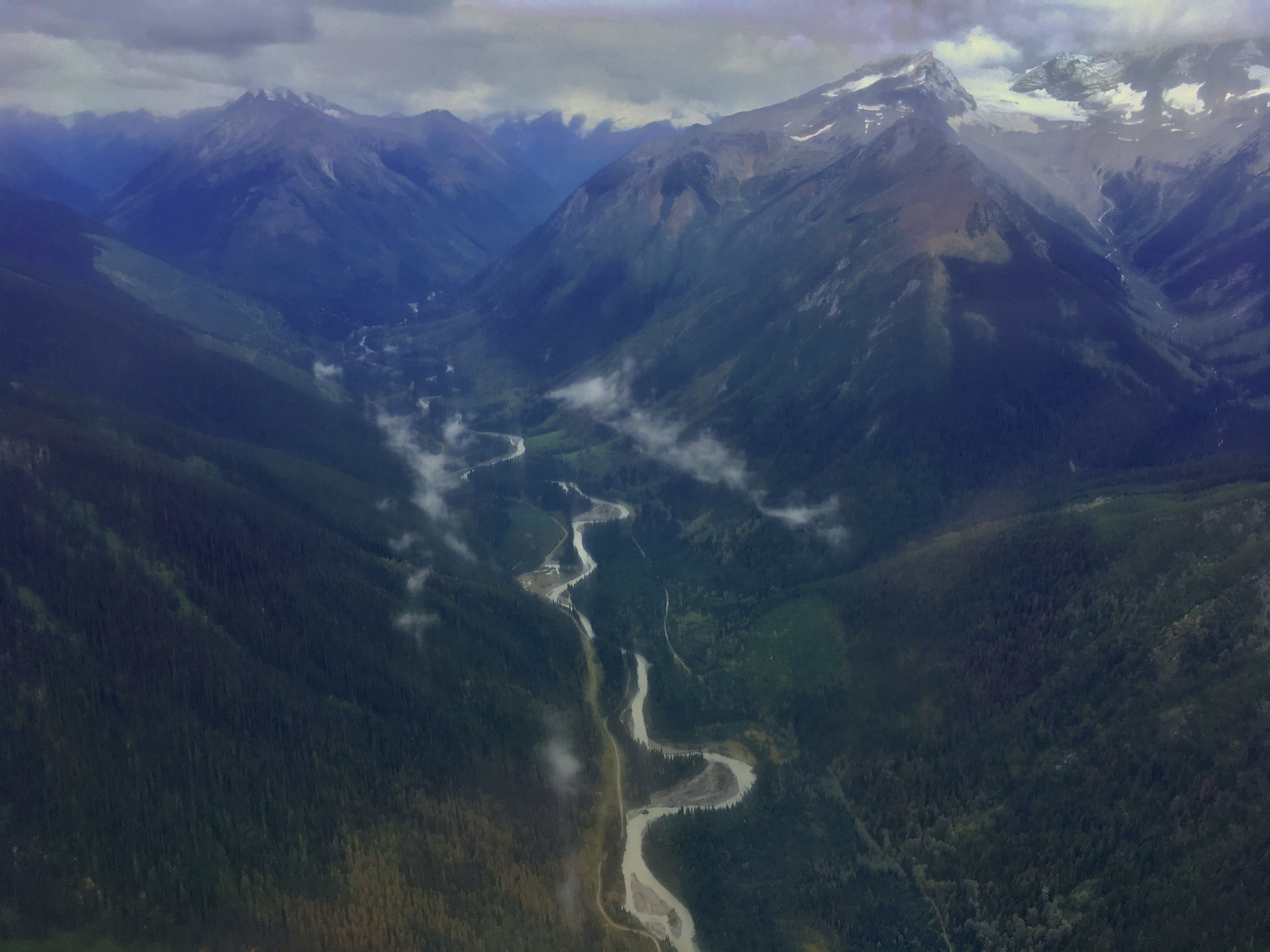
Lower Castle Creek looking upstream towards the Cariboo Mountains

Castle Creek, also known locally as Cottonwood Creek, is a tributary of the Fraser River in the Robson Valley region of British Columbia. Castle Creek flows from its source at Castle Creek glacier in the Cariboo Mountains to its confluence with the Fraser near McBride. The Castle Creek glacier has seen major retreats in the late 2010s, receding by an average of 15 metres a year. The creek provides hydroelectricity through a "run-of-the-river" instream generating station run by BC Hydro, which provides 34 gigawatt hours of electricity annually.

== See also ==
- List of rivers of British Columbia
