= Castle Creek (Rogue River tributary) =

Stream in Oregon, United States

- Location within Oregon Location within the United States

Physical characteristics
- Source
  - coordinates: 42.8963889°N 122.1658333°W
- Mouth
  - coordinates: 42.9278721°N 122.4243337°W

Castle Creek is a stream in the U.S. state of Oregon. It is a tributary to the Rogue River.

Castle Creek was so named on account of peculiar rock formations along its course.
