= Mariben Berja =

Filipino educator

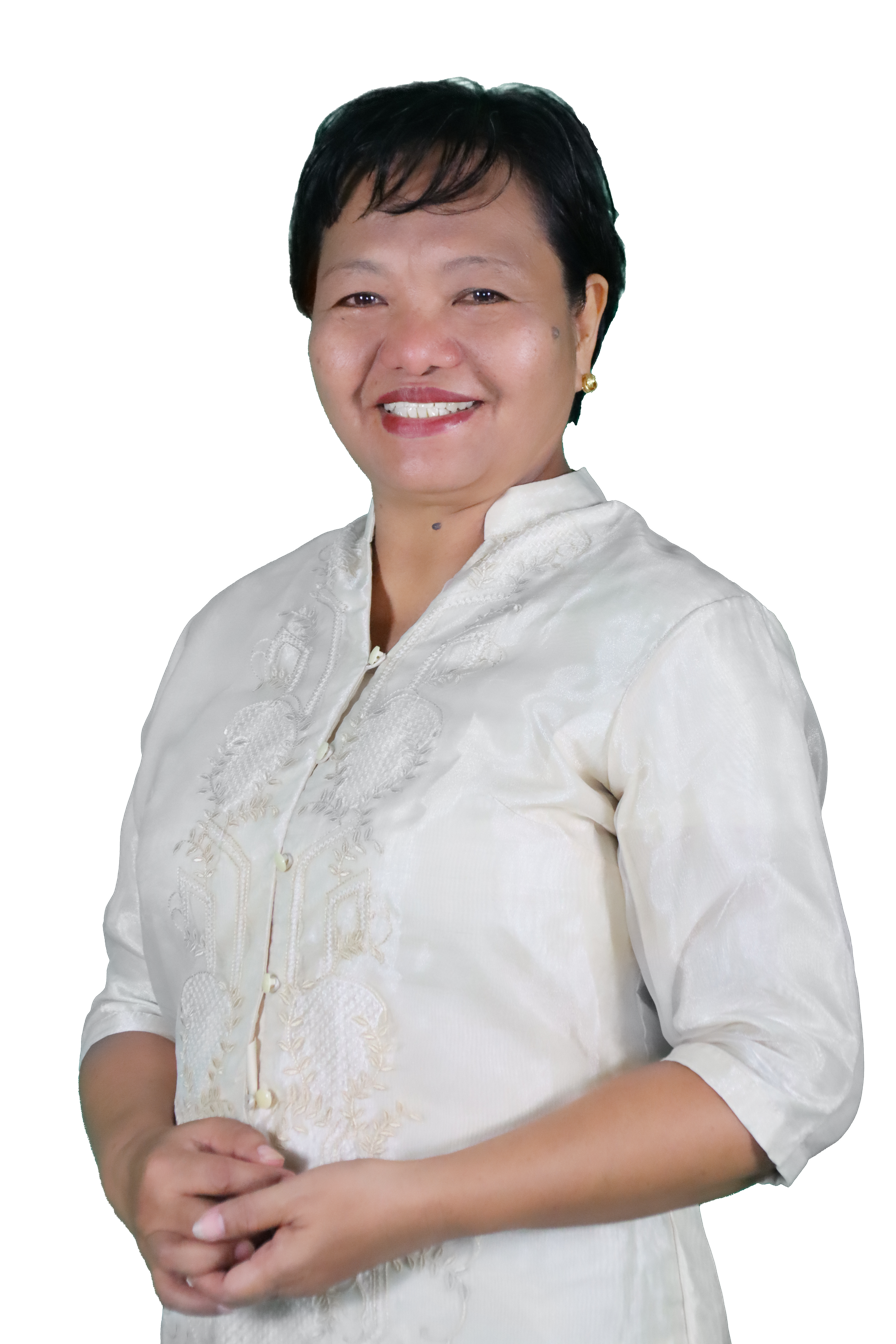

Personal details
- Occupation: Educator

Mariben Dela Cruz Berja is a Filipino educator and public school administration official. She currently serves as the chief of the Curriculum and Implementation Division of the Schools Division Office of Camarines Sur under the Department of Education, Region V in the Philippines.

Berja has held the position of chief of the Curriculum and Implementation Division, where she is responsible for supervising curriculum planning, implementation, and instructional support services for basic education in the Camarines Sur Schools Division. In this capacity, she has participated as a speaker and resource person at various educational seminars and workshops, including events focusing on research, curriculum design, and pedagogical leadership for educators. As part of her work with the Curriculum and Implementation Division, Berja has contributed to professional activities addressing the implementation of the Department of Education’s curriculum frameworks, including the MATATAG Curriculum seminar-workshop organized for teachers and education staff in Camarines Sur.

== See also ==
- Gilbert Sadsad
