= Castle Creek (Washington) =

Stream in Washington, United States

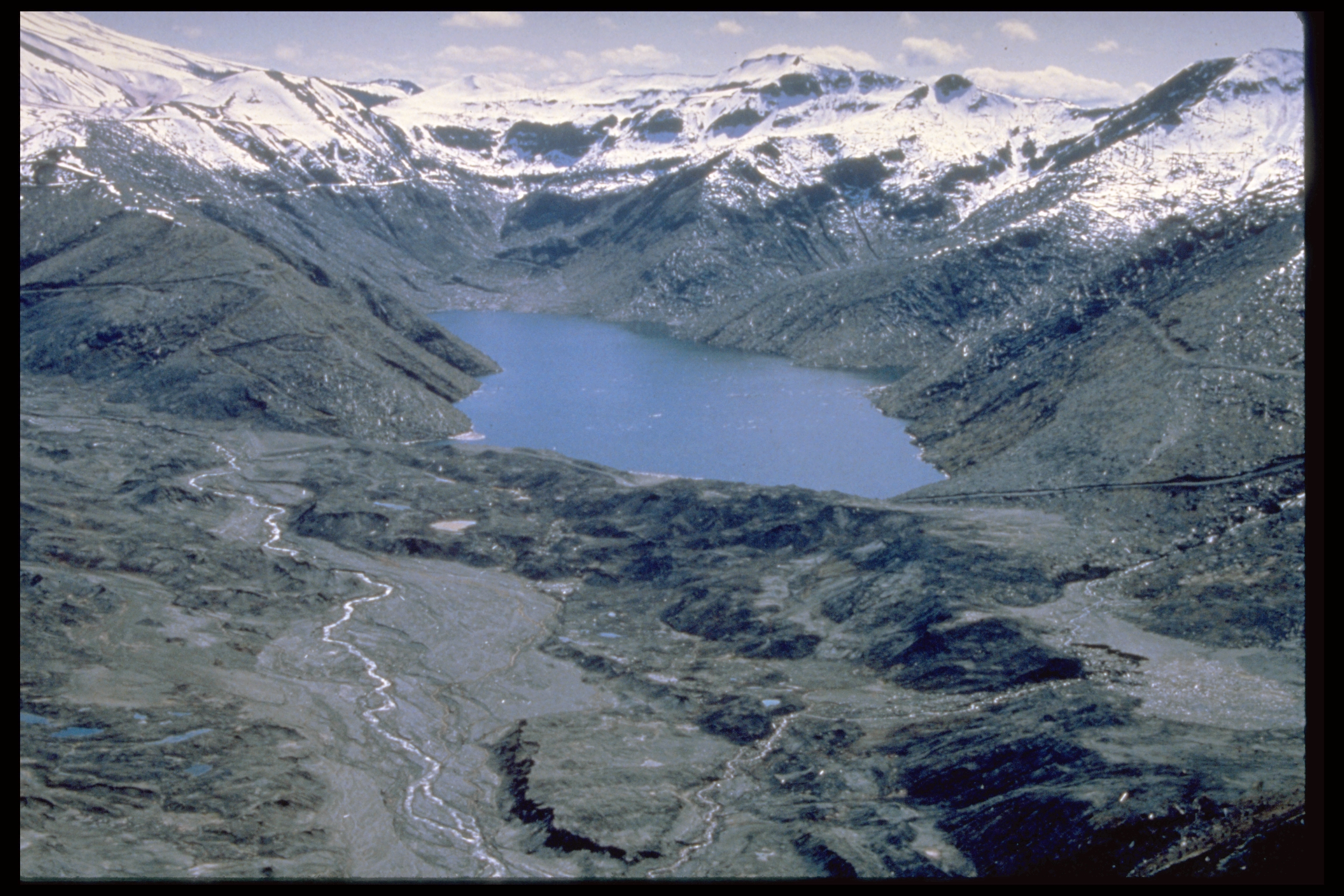
- Aerial view of Castle Creek and Castle Lake. Part of Mount St. Helens is visible in the upper left corner of the image.

- Location within Washington (state)

Location
- Country: United States
- U.S. State: Washington
- County: Cowlitz
- County: Skamania

Physical characteristics
- Source
  - location: West flank of Mount St. Helens
  - coordinates: 46.21690°N 122.23934°W
  - elevation: 4,275 feet
- Mouth: North Fork Toutle River
  - coordinates: 46.28302°N 122.29359°W
  - elevation: 2,200 feet

Basin features
- Tributaries
  - left: South Fork Castle Creek
- Waterbodies: Castle Lake (South Fork)

Castle Creek is a tributary of the North Fork Toutle River on the flank of Mount St. Helens in Washington state. It rises about two miles (three kilometers) northwest of the crater rim (46.21690°N 122.23934°W) and flows generally to the northwest. The outflow of Castle Lake joins the creek at the lake's north end (46.258°N 122.272°W) after traveling a few hundred meters on the South Fork Castle Creek. It joins the North Fork Toutle River at 46.28302°N 122.29359°W, elevation 2,200 feet.

Castle Lake was created by an avalanche subsequent to the May 18, 1980 eruption of Mount St. Helens which blocked South Fork Castle Creek. Pre-1980 maps show this area as "Castle Creek Marsh".
