= Legazpi, Albay =

Capital city of Albay Province, Philippines

Legazpi
- Component city
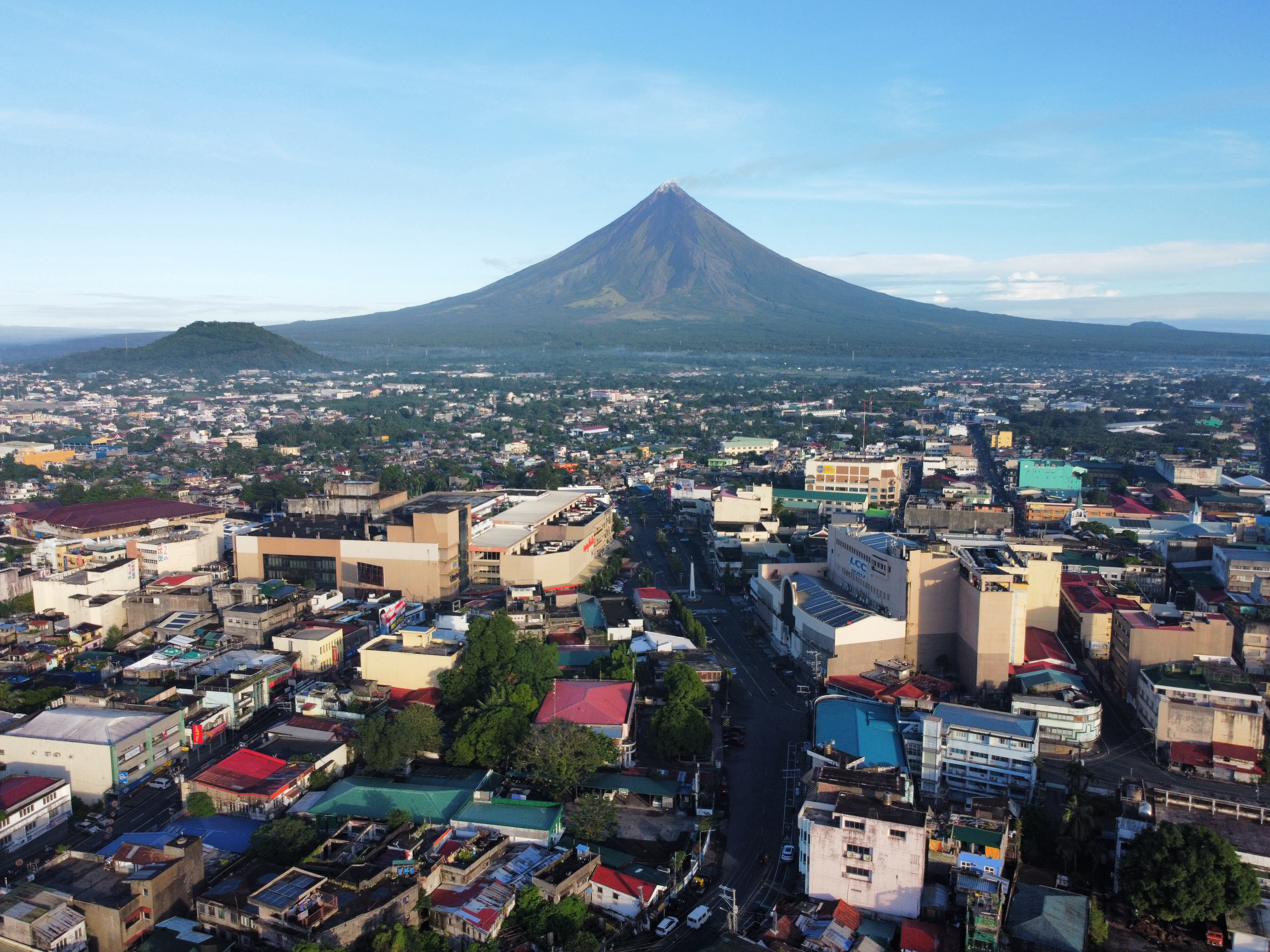
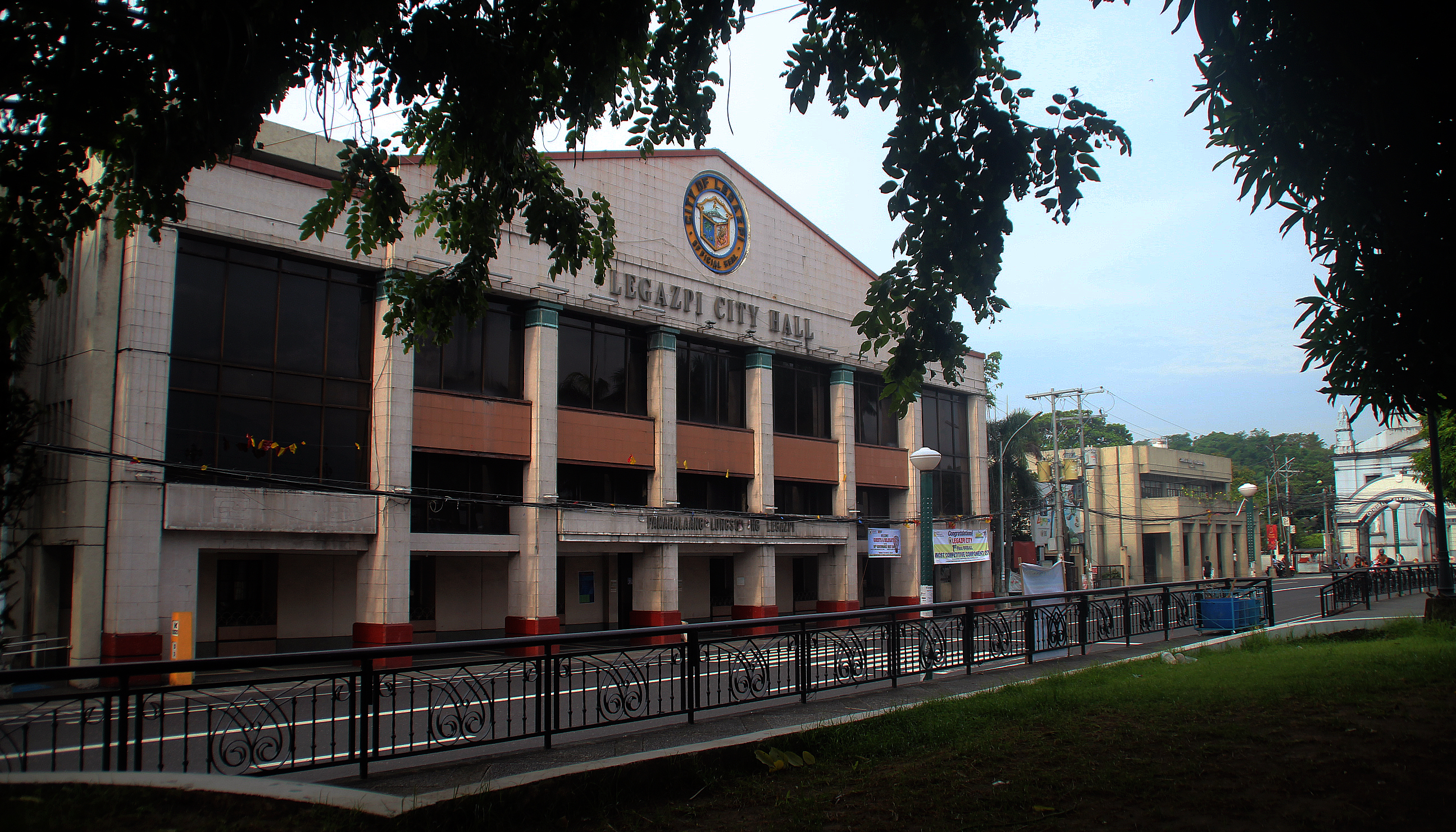
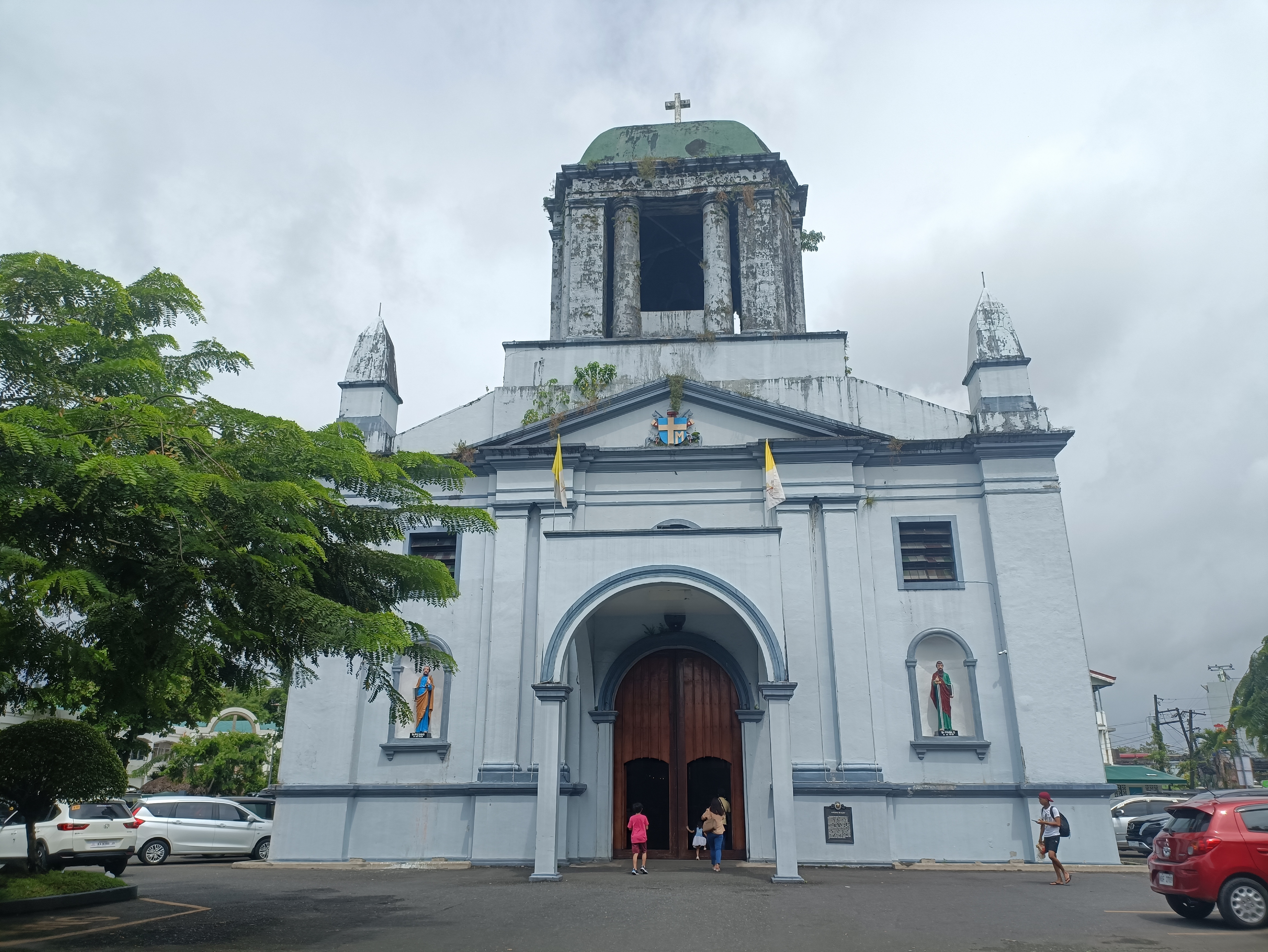
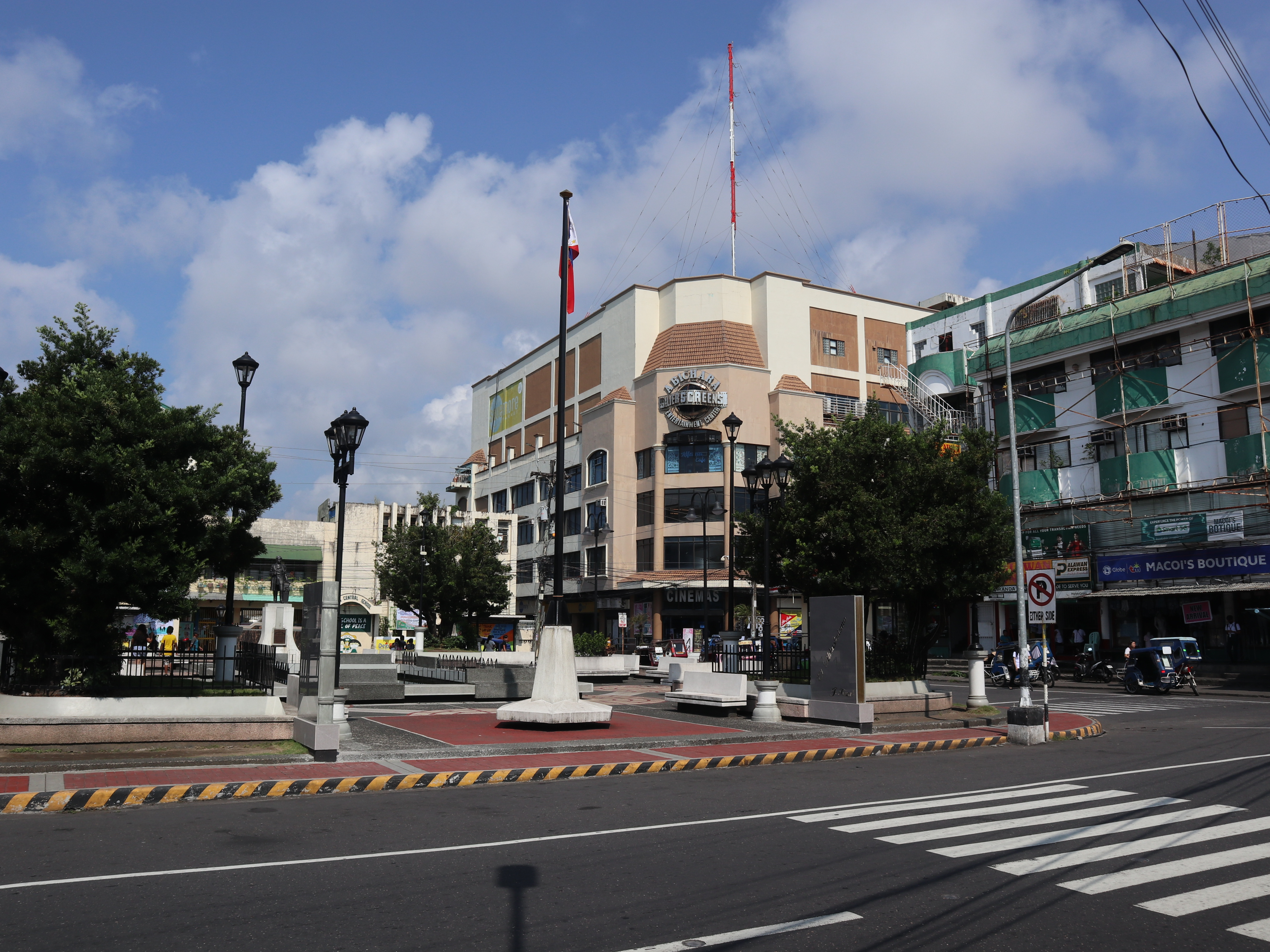
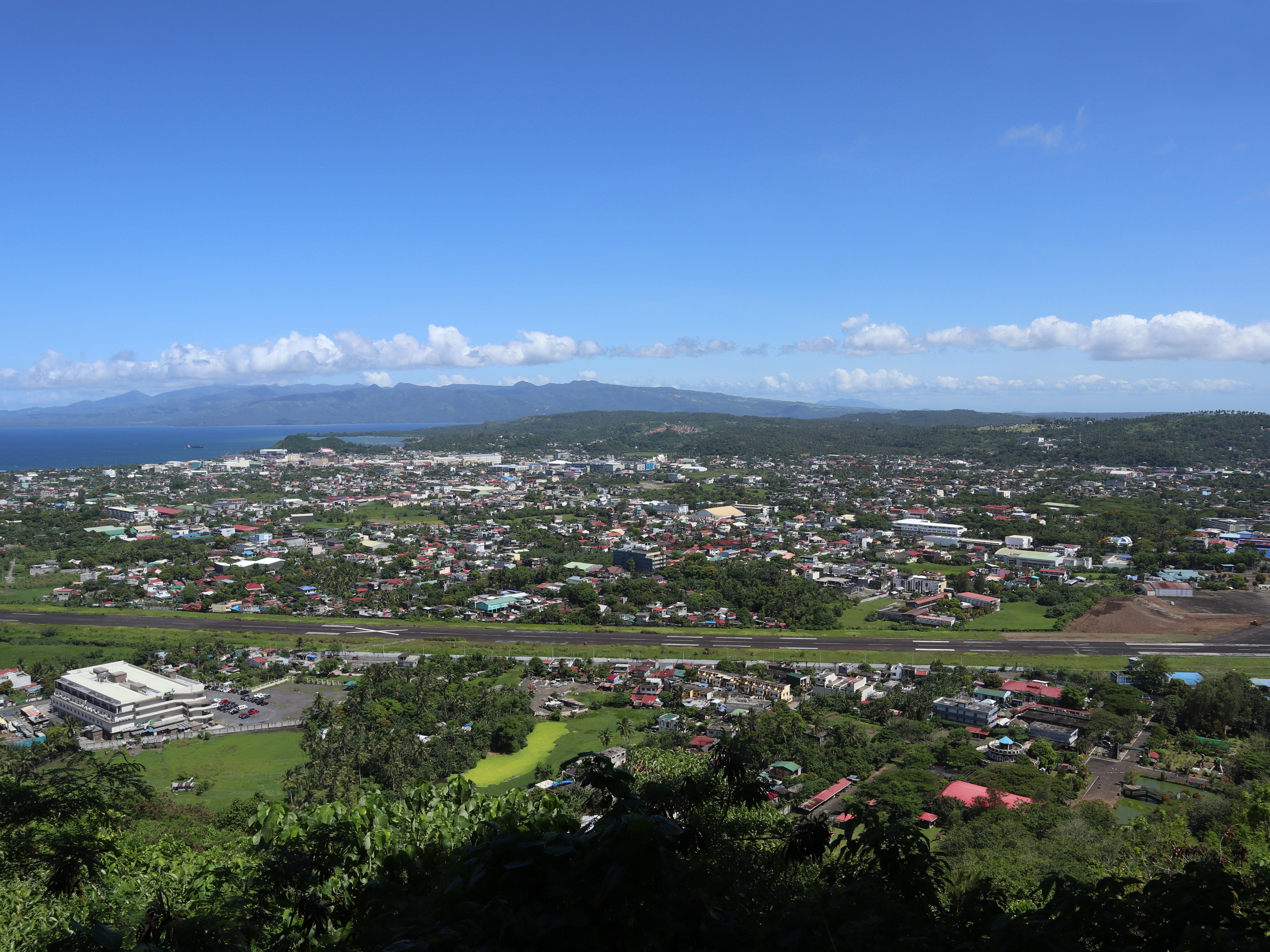
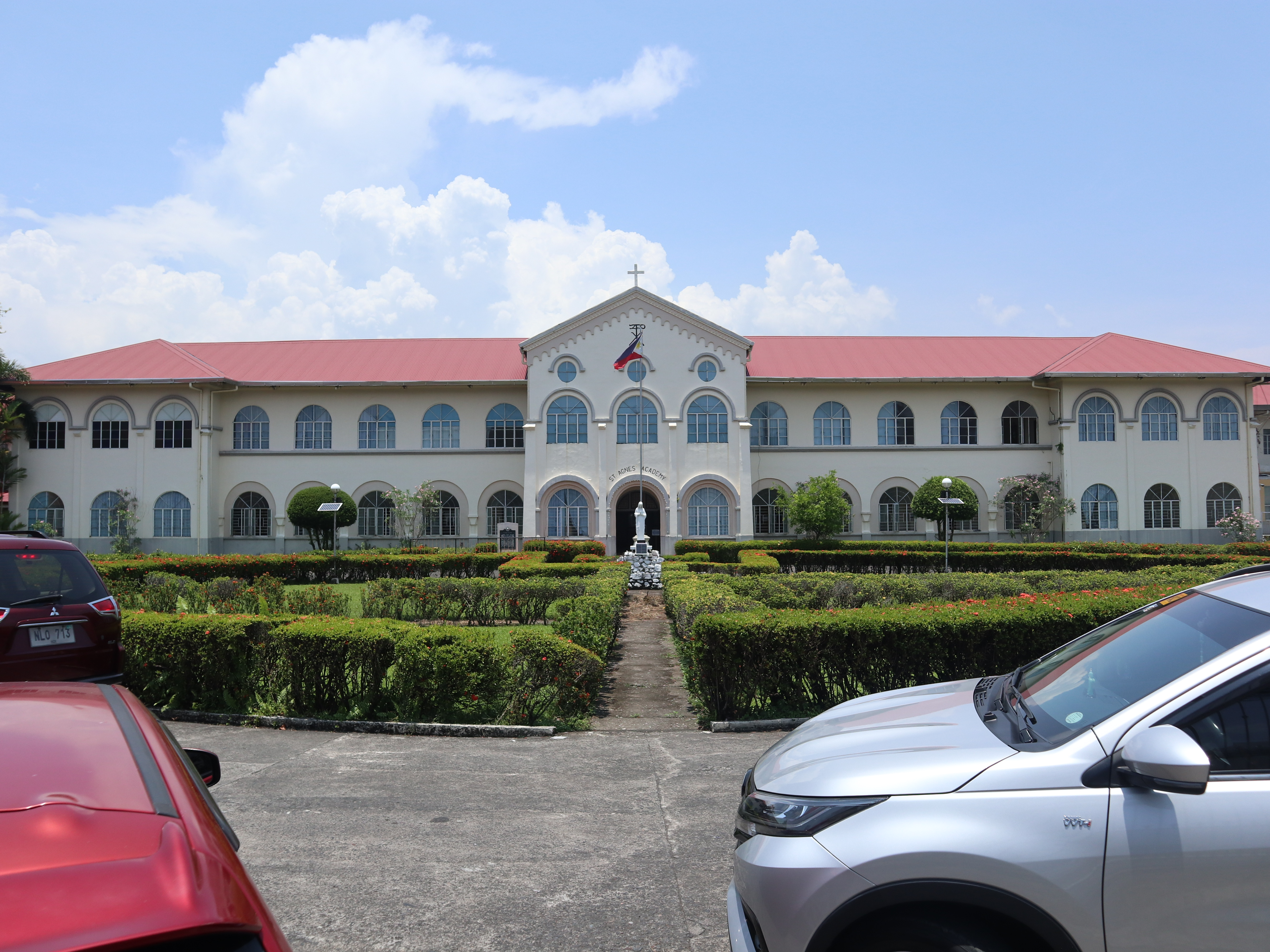
- Legazpi Port District Legazpi City Hall Quezon Avenue St. Gregory the Great Cathedral Plaza Rizal View from Ligñon Hill St. Agnes Academy

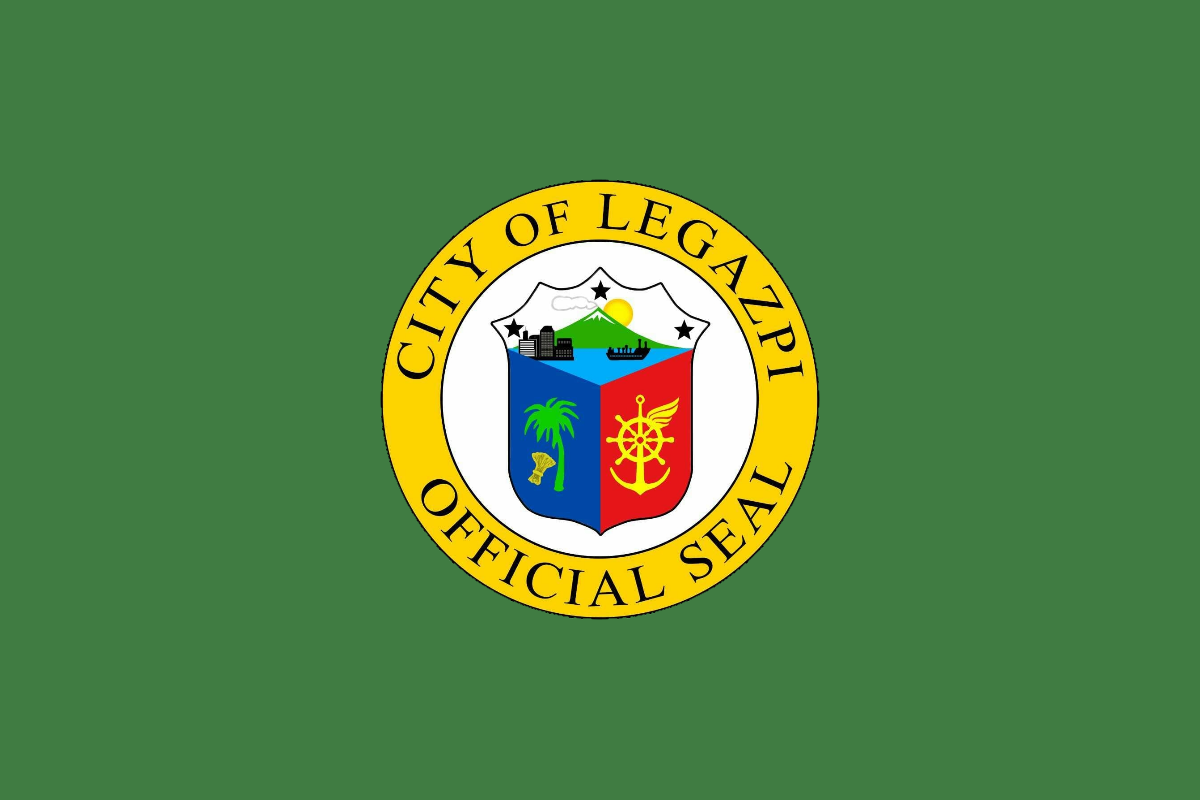
- Flag Seal
- Nicknames: Queen City of Southern Luzon City of Fun and Adventure; Gateway of Southern Luzon; Gateway City of Bicol
- Anthem: Legazpi Ngunyan
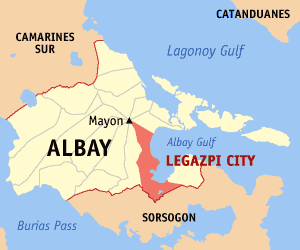
- Map of Albay with Legazpi highlighted
- Interactive map of Legazpi
- Location within the Philippines
- Coordinates: 13°08′N 123°44′E
- Country: Philippines
- Region: Bicol Region
- Province: Albay
- District: 2nd district
- Founded: 1616
- Cityhood: 1892 (First time); July 18, 1948 (Second time); June 12, 1959 (Final date)
- Named for: Miguel Lopez de Legazpi
- Barangays: 70 (see Barangays)

Government
  - Type: Sangguniang Panlungsod
  - Mayor: Hisham B. Ismail
  - Vice Mayor: Luis Felipe L. Gutierrez
  - Representative: Carlos A. Loria
  - City Council: Members: Vincent F. Baltazar; Lourence M. Beltran; Ismael Buban IV; Alexander Jao; Roberto Rafael N. Lucila; Joseph Philip L. Lee; Charlton Lajara; Maria Paz Salud C. Imperial; Alan O. Rañola; Renato A. Valladolid
  - Electorate: 147,382 voters (2025)

Area
  - Total: 153.70 km^{2} (59.34 sq mi)
- Elevation: 149 m (489 ft)
- Highest elevation: 2,444 m (8,018 ft)
- Lowest elevation: 0 m (0 ft)

Population (2024 census)
  - Total: 210,616
  - Density: 1,370.3/km^{2} (3,549.1/sq mi)
  - Households: 46,445
- Demonym(s): Legazpeños (masculine); Legazpeñas (feminine); Legazpians (English, occasionally)

Economy
  - Income class: 1st city income class
  - Poverty incidence: 16.32% (2023)
  - Revenue: ₱ 1,833 million (2024)
  - Assets: ₱ 6,998 million (2024)
  - Expenditure: ₱ 1,602 million (2024)
  - Liabilities: ₱ 889.5 million (2024)

Service provider
  - Electricity: Albay Power and Energy Corporation (APEC)
- Time zone: UTC+8 (PST)
- ZIP code: 4500
- PSGC: 050506000
- IDD : area code: +63 (0)52
- Native languages: Albay Bikol; Tagalog
- Catholic diocese: Diocese of Legazpi
- Website: legazpi.gov.ph

Legazpi (or the City of Legazpi; Tagalog: Lungsod ng Legazpi [lɛˈɡaspɪ]; Central Bikol: Syudad nin Legazpi), is a component city and the capital of the province of Albay. According to the 2024 census, it has a population of 210,616 people.

Originally a pre-Hispanic coastal village called Sawangan, the settlement became a Spanish mission town in 1587 and was renamed in 1856 to honor conquistador Miguel López de Legazpi, a Basque. The city lies south of Mayon Volcano – an active stratovolcano known for its nearly symmetrical conical shape – and Legazpi is the base for volcano monitoring and hazard management operations in the region.

Legazpi is the administrative, economic, and transport hub of the Bicol Region. The city is served by air, sea, and land transport infrastructure, including Bicol International Airport in neighboring Daraga, ports along Albay Gulf, Philippine National Railways, and the national highway network. It also functions as the region's center for tourism, education, health care, and commerce, with a diversified service-based economy focused on trade, agro‑processing, and adventure tourism.

Legazpi topped the National Competitiveness Council's Cities & Municipalities Competitive Index in 2018 and has ranked in the index's top tier in the years since, earning citations as a "most business-friendly" Philippine city. Having met the necessary statutory requirements the city is now being considered for reclassification from a Component City (CC) to a Highly Urbanized City (HUC).

== Origin of name ==
Miguel López de Legazpi

The city of Legazpi was named after Miguel López de Legazpi, a Basque Spanish conquistador who led the first Spanish colonial expedition to the Philippine Islands in 1565 and established Manila as the colonial capital. His surname derives from the town of Legazpi in Gipuzkoa, Spain.

== History ==
=== Early history ===
Early human occupation around present-day Legazpi and the wider Albay Gulf is documented by archaeological finds that extend back at least 4,000 years. The sixteenth-century chronicler Miguel de Loarca described the Albay coast as "thickly peopled," rich in irrigated rice, gold ornaments, and imported silk, reflecting the area's prosperity prior to Spanish contact and aligning with the archaeological evidence.

The earliest securely dated artifact from the area is the Mataas Shell Scoop, a bailer fashioned from the green-turban shell (Turbo marmoratus). Excavated from a midden on Cagraray Island its deposit was radiocarbon-dated to between c. 2000 BCE and 300 CE, and in 2010 it was designated a National Cultural Treasure by the National Museum of the Philippines.

Stratified deposits in Hoyop-Hoyopan Cave, Camalig (approx. 15 km inland) have yielded primary and secondary jar burials with anthropomorphic lids. Associated Song to Ming period ceramic shards indicate continuous use of the cave between 900 BCE and 900 CE and suggest participation in regional maritime exchange networks. Comparable jar burial complexes along the Albay-Sorsogon littoral, recorded by H. Otley Beyer and later National Museum teams, contain plain and red-slipped vessels, stone adzes, and shell and glass beads attributed to the Philippine Early Metal Age (c. 100–500 BCE).

The area now occupied by present-day Legazpi originated as a coastal settlement known as Sawangan, now located in what is the port district. It consisted of a cluster of fishing and farming hamlets situated along the mangrove flats on the western shore of Albay Gulf.

=== Spanish contact ===
The first Europeans to reach the Albay Gulf were Captain Luis Enríquez de Guzmán and Augustinian friar Alonso Jiménez, members of an expedition dispatched from Panay by Adelantado Miguel López de Legazpi. After calling at Masbate, Ticao and Burias the party landed at the village of Gibalon (also known as Ibalon), now San Isidro in the municipality of Magallanes, Sorsogon. Friar Jiménez celebrated what local tradition recognises as the first Catholic Mass in Luzon and also baptised several inhabitants. The group reconnoitered inland as far as Camalig, then a thriving barangay (the smallest administrative and political unit of government in the Philippines), and recorded the fertile valley at the foot of Mayon Volcano.

In July 1573, a second force under Juan de Salcedo, grandson of Governor-General Legazpi, entered the peninsula from the north. Salcedo established the fortified Villa de Santiago de Libón on the shores of Lake Bato (present-day Libon, Albay), then pushed eastwards to a village called Albaybay, a name later shortened to Albay.

Franciscan missionaries replaced the initial Augustinian presence in 1578 and administered Sawangan from the Doctrina de Cagsawa, now Daraga. Sawangan was elevated to a visita regular in 1605 and was constituted in 1616 as the independent Pueblo de Albay, capital of the newly created Partido de Ibalon district. That district encompassed present-day Albay, Sorsogon, Masbate, large parts of Camarines Sur, and the islands of Catanduanes, Ticao, and Burias.

=== Spanish colonial era ===
==== Missionary foundations (1587–1636) ====
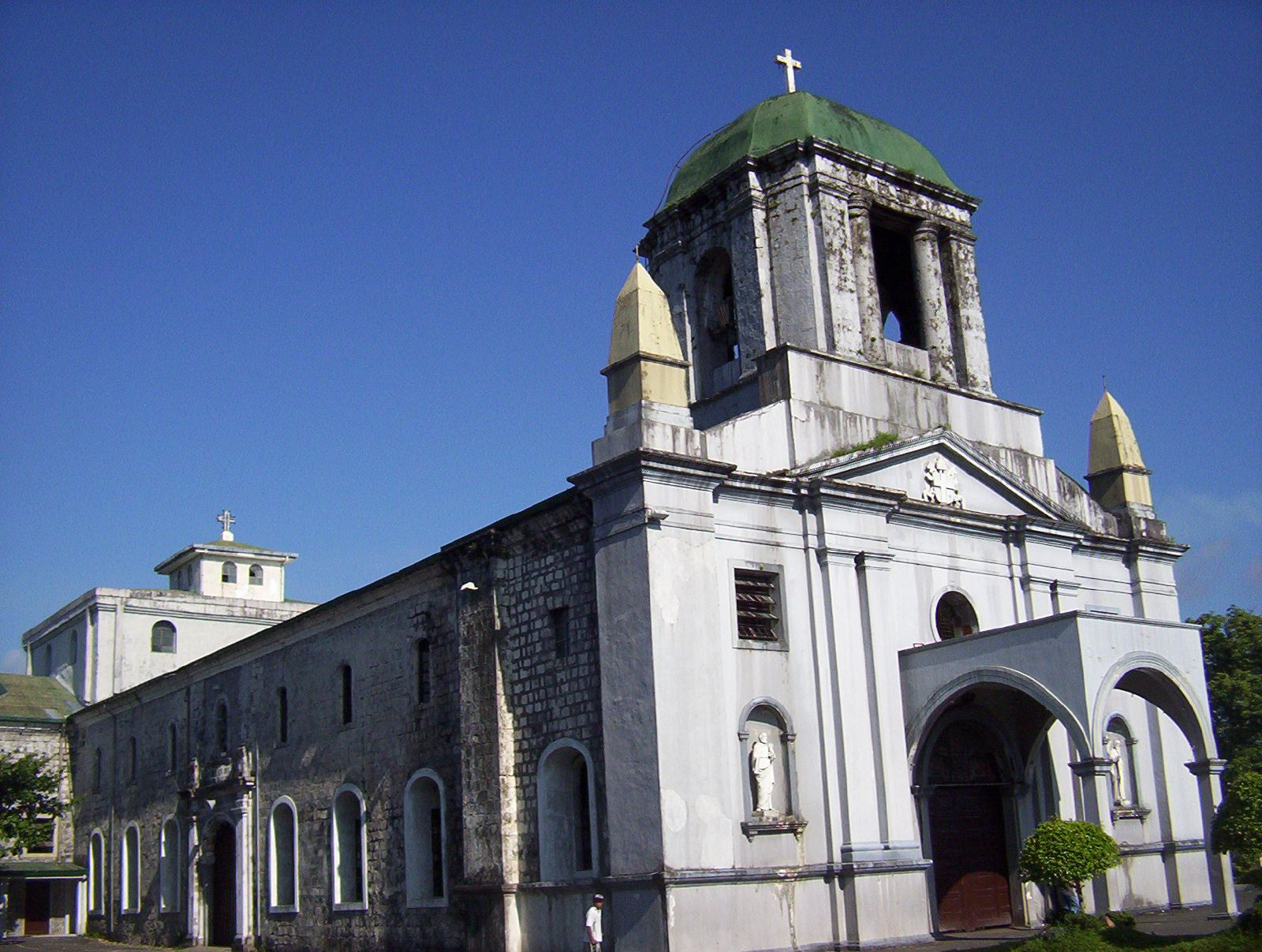
St. Gregory the Great Cathedral

By the 1580s, Spanish Franciscan missionaries were actively ministering to the local inhabitants and in 1587 the Franciscans established a mission chapel in Sawangan as a visita (satellite chapel) of the Cagsawa parish. Friar Francisco de Santa Ana OFM built the first wooden chapel –dedicated to St. Gregory the Great – and this became known as the Misión de San Gregorio Magno de Sawangan.

As the village grew more populous, it had been elevated to a visita regular (full mission station) by 1605 and eventually to an independent pueblo (town) with its own parish in 1616. The new town was often referred to at the time as Pueblo de Albay and became the capital of the Partido de Ibalón, the colonial province encompassing present-day Albay, Sorsogon, Masbate, and nearby islands.

Friar Francisco de Santa Ana served as Sawangan's first parish priest and the mission continued to flourish into the 17th century. In 1636, during the tenure of Friar Martín del Espíritu, OFM, a larger and more permanent church structure was built to replace the original chapel and better serve the growing Christian community.

==== Growth under Spanish administration (17th-18th century) ====
Sawangan developed throughout the 17th and 18th centuries as a coastal settlement engaged in farming and regional trade, with its location along Albay Gulf providing a sheltered anchorage for galleons and other vessels traveling the Manila–Acapulco trade route. The nearby Sula Channel, separating the mainland from Cagraray Island, also offered safe refuge for ships during storms.

However, Sawangan's growth was periodically disrupted by external threats. Spanish colonial records describe incursions by raiding parties from Mindanao and the Sulu Archipelago – called "Moro raiders" – as well as by Dutch privateers operating in Philippine waters during the 1600s. In 1754, the town's church was destroyed by fire amid renewed pirate attacks, and Sawangan survived a devastating typhoon in 1742 and a strong earthquake in 1811. Despite these challenges, by the early 19th century Sawangan had grown into an important provincial capital and port, partly through the incorporation of nearby villages.

==== 1814 eruption of Mt. Mayon ====
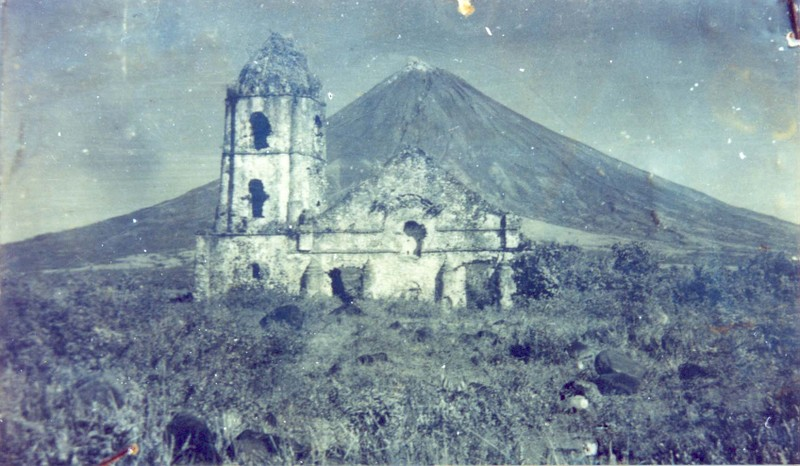
Façade of the old church of Cagsawa, destroyed in the eruption of Mt. Mayon on February 1, 1814

On February 1, 1814 Mayon Volcano erupted in the most cataclysmic explosion in its recorded history. The eruption obliterated or buried several neighboring settlements under volcanic ash and lahar flows, including the church of Cagsawa and the villages of Budiao and Camalig. Twelve hundred people were killed, making it Mayon's deadliest known eruption, and Sawangan itself was partly destroyed with the entire town effectively leveled and a large portion of its inhabitants having perished or fled.

After the 1814 eruption, the parish priest of Sawangan, Friar Pedro Licup OFM, led the survivors in relocating to highland areas at Makalaya on the slopes of Mount Bariw, present-day Barangay Taysan. However, many of the evacuees were lowlanders accustomed to coastal living and grew uncomfortable in the uplands. Within a few years groups of survivors began returning to the lowlands, with a significant number resettling in an area called Taytay – now Barangay Bagumbayan in downtown Legazpi – which grew into a flourishing community. Others defied official orders and went back to the original coastal site of Sawangan, founding a new village on the ruins of Sawangan that they called Binanuahan (meaning "old town," also known as Banuang Gurang in Bikol). By 1818, a Spanish census which included the islands of Masbate, Catanduanes, and Ticao showed that Legazpi and the rest of the province had 35,321 native families and 1,334 Spanish-Filipino families.

However, Spanish authorities issued a decree on October 1, 1829 prohibiting the establishment of new towns without government sanction. To comply with this policy, the growing lowland community at Taytay and the smaller coastal village at Binanuahan were officially treated as one combined town. The inland Taytay side became the primary township known as Albay Nuevo or "New Albay", with Binanuahan designated as its visita (tributary barrio). Albay Nuevo essentially replaced the original town as the provincial capital in the 1820s and 1830s, although many residents of Binanuahan resented being subordinated to the new town's administration.

==== Ecclesiastical reconstruction (1834–1855) ====
In 1834, efforts were made to re-establish substantial churches in both the new and old settlements. In Albay Nuevo, a grand stone church was planned to replace the makeshift structures that had served the relocated populace. Construction began in 1839 on a design by Don José Ma. de Peñaranda – a Filipino-Spanish gobernadorcillo (town head and architect) – with consultation from Friar José Yagres OFM. Completed in the 1840s, this stone church became the present St. Gregory the Great Cathedral in Legazpi's Old Albay District.

Also in 1834, the villagers who had returned to Binanuahan built a modest chapel (ermita) dedicated to St. Raphael the Archangel and chose St. Raphael as their new patron saint. Funded in part by a prominent local benefactor Don Pedro Romero, this waterfront chapel was later expanded and today stands as the St. Raphael the Archangel Parish Church in the Legazpi Port District. For the next two decades, Albay Nuevo and Binanuahan functioned as two distinct sectors of the Albay town – one inland and one by the port – each with its own church and patron saint.

==== Creation of the town (1856) ====
On July 17, 1856, by decree of Governor-General Ramon Montero acting for the superior government in Manila, the coastal visita of Binanuahan and the adjacent barrios of Lamba, Rawis, and Bigaa were carved out from Albay Nuevo to form a new and separate township, initially called Pueblo Viejo ("Old Town") in acknowledgement of the site's history. A subsequent decree issued by Montero on September 22, 1856 conferred the name Legazpi on this town in honor of Miguel López de Legazpi, the 16th-century conquistador who had dispatched an expedition to Bicol during the Spanish conquest. The town of Legazpi was formally inaugurated on October 23, 1856, encompassing the port area and outlying barrios. The remaining inland settlement retained the name "Albay" and continued as the provincial capital enclave, corresponding to what is now the Old Albay District of Legazpi City. Legazpi's first gobernadorcillo (municipal governor) was Don Lorenzo Hao and its first parish priest – in an acting capacity – was Rev. Camilo Abainza.

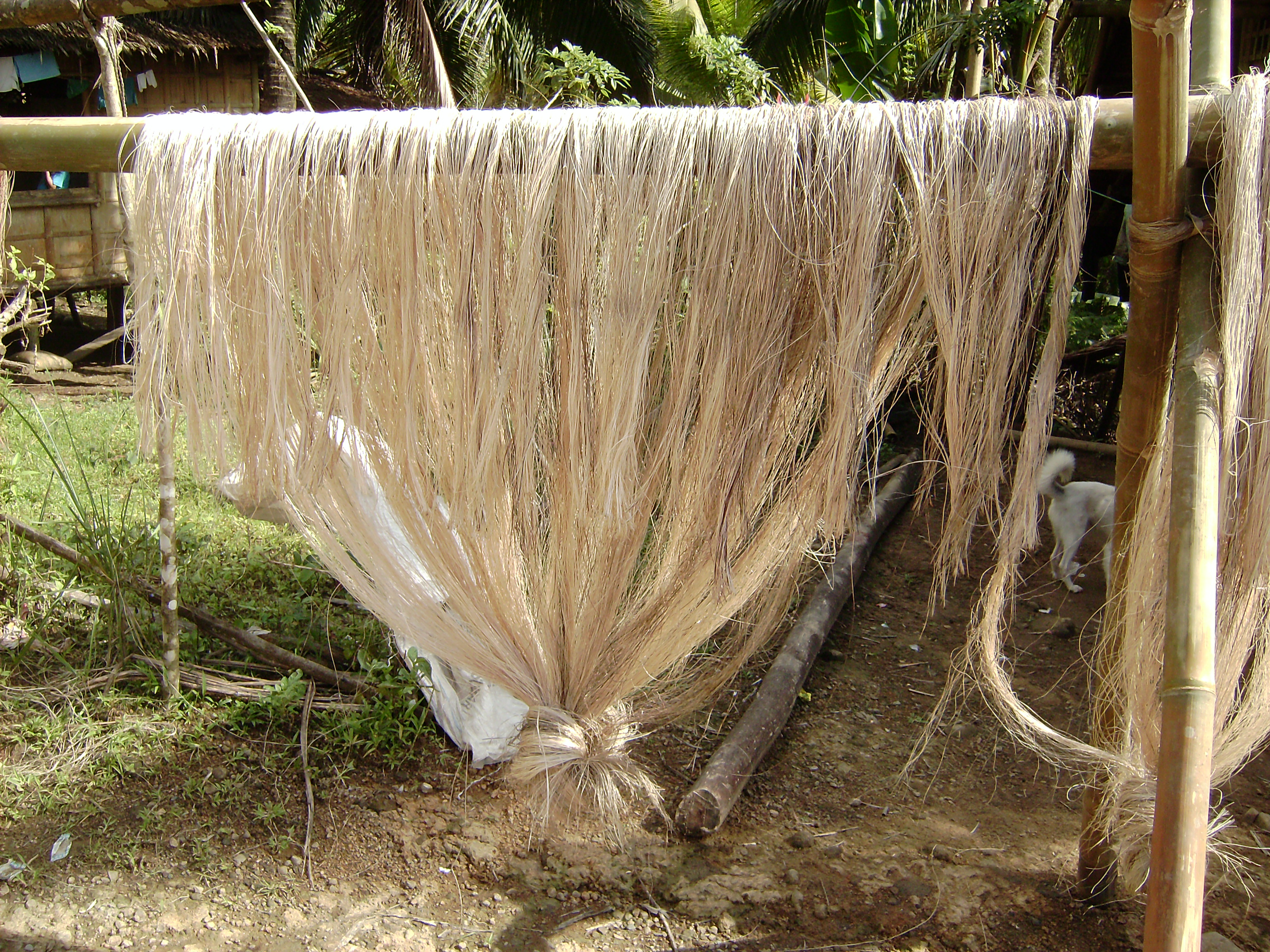
Abaca fiber

Thanks to its geography, the new town of Legazpi was able to become an important commercial hub in the region. Its port had long played a role in regional commerce, with vessels bound for Nueva España (Mexico) during the galleon trade era frequenting Albay Gulf as an anchorage point from the late 16th century onward. As international trade expanded in the 19th century, Legazpi's harbor grew in importance for maritime commerce in southern Luzon, with the Spanish Crown issuing a royal decree in Madrid on May 18, 1872 designating Legazpi as an official port of entry for foreign trade. This decree was implemented locally two years later on December 3, 1874, when Governor-General Juan Alaminos y Vivar promulgated the order opening Legazpi's port to direct trade with overseas markets. This move allowed the export of local products such as abacá fiber ("Manila hemp")and copra from Bicol and the import of goods via maritime routes, spurring economic growth in Albay. By the late 19th century Legazpi had become one of the busier ports in the archipelago outside Manila, albeit still limited by its modest dock facilities and the threat of seasonal typhoons.

Parallel with its commercial rise, Legazpi saw political developments in the late Spanish period. In 1892, the town was elevated to city status (ciudad) under Spain's new Becerra Law on municipal government. This law merged the municipalities of Legazpi Port, Albay (Bagumbayan), and the outlying town of Daraga into a single unified city administration, called the Ayuntamiento of Legazpi (Albay). The actual ayuntamiento (city council government) was formally established in 1894 by a decree of the Spanish Minister of Ultramar (colonies), and under this arrangement both Albay Nuevo and the separate town of Daraga formed by survivors of the Cagsawa eruption were annexed as part of the new city's territory. This merger proved unpopular among many Daraga residents, who resented the loss of their town's autonomy. Nevertheless, by the mid-1890s Legazpi – sometimes referred to as Ayuntamiento de Albay – held the status of a chartered city.

=== Philippine revolution (1898) ===
As the Philippine Revolution spread throughout the archipelago in 1898, Spanish rule in Albay came to an abrupt end. On September 22, 1898, with the colonial government collapsing, the Spanish civil governor of Albay, Don Ángel Bascarán y Federic, evacuated the provincial capital of Old Albay along with its remaining Spanish troops and clergy. Spanish authorities and residents fled the town, effectively surrendering control, and in their wake local patriots organized a revolutionary junta to assume governance of Albay. The junta was initially led by Don Anacieto Solano, a prominent Filipino from the region who had been involved in the anti-colonial movement.

Shortly after, General Vicente Lukbán arrived to take command. Lukbán had been appointed by Emilio Aguinaldo's revolutionary government as general-in-chief for the southern Luzon provinces and he formally took charge of military and civil affairs in Albay and neighboring areas. Under Lukbán's leadership the Philippine Republic's authority was established in Legazpi and Albay by late 1898, marking the close of over 300 years of Spanish colonial rule.

=== American colonial era (1900–1941) ===
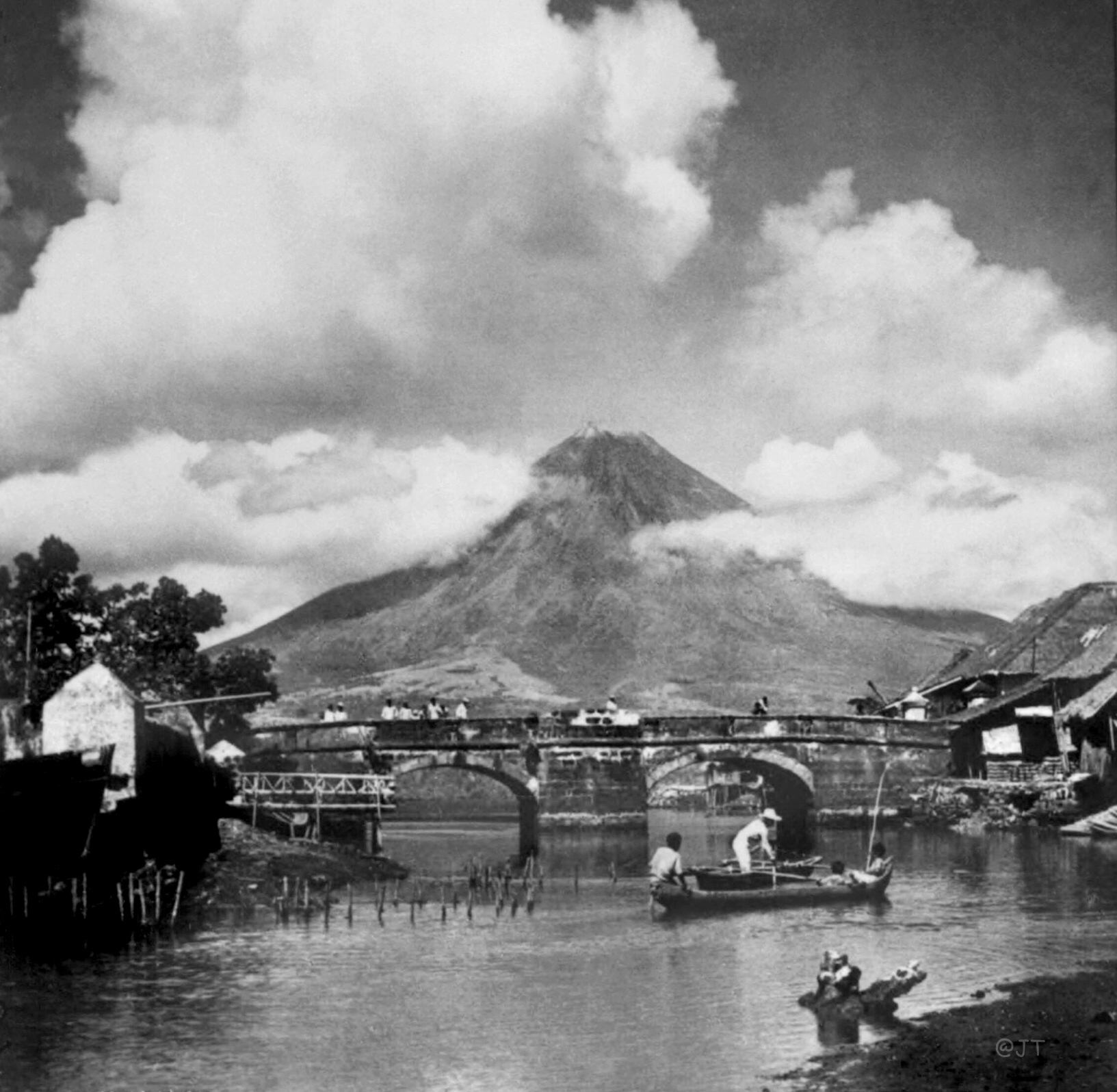
Old San Rafael Bridge in Legazpi, ca. early 20th century

On January 23, 1900 three companies of the US 24th Infantry and two batteries of light artillery under Brig-Gen. William A. Kobbe landed at Legazpi to re-open the abacá port. Eight hundred Bicolano revolutionary troops led by Gen. José Ignacio Paua and Col. Antero Reyes contested the landing, fighting a day-long action on San Rafael Bridge that left 172 Filipino dead (including Reyes) and 12 wounded, while US casualties were 12 wounded. The skirmish is regarded by regional historians as the bloodiest single engagement of the Philippine-American War in Bicol, and a granite obelisk – the Battle of Legazpi Pylon – now stands at the intersection of Rizal Street and Quezon Avenue to mark the site.

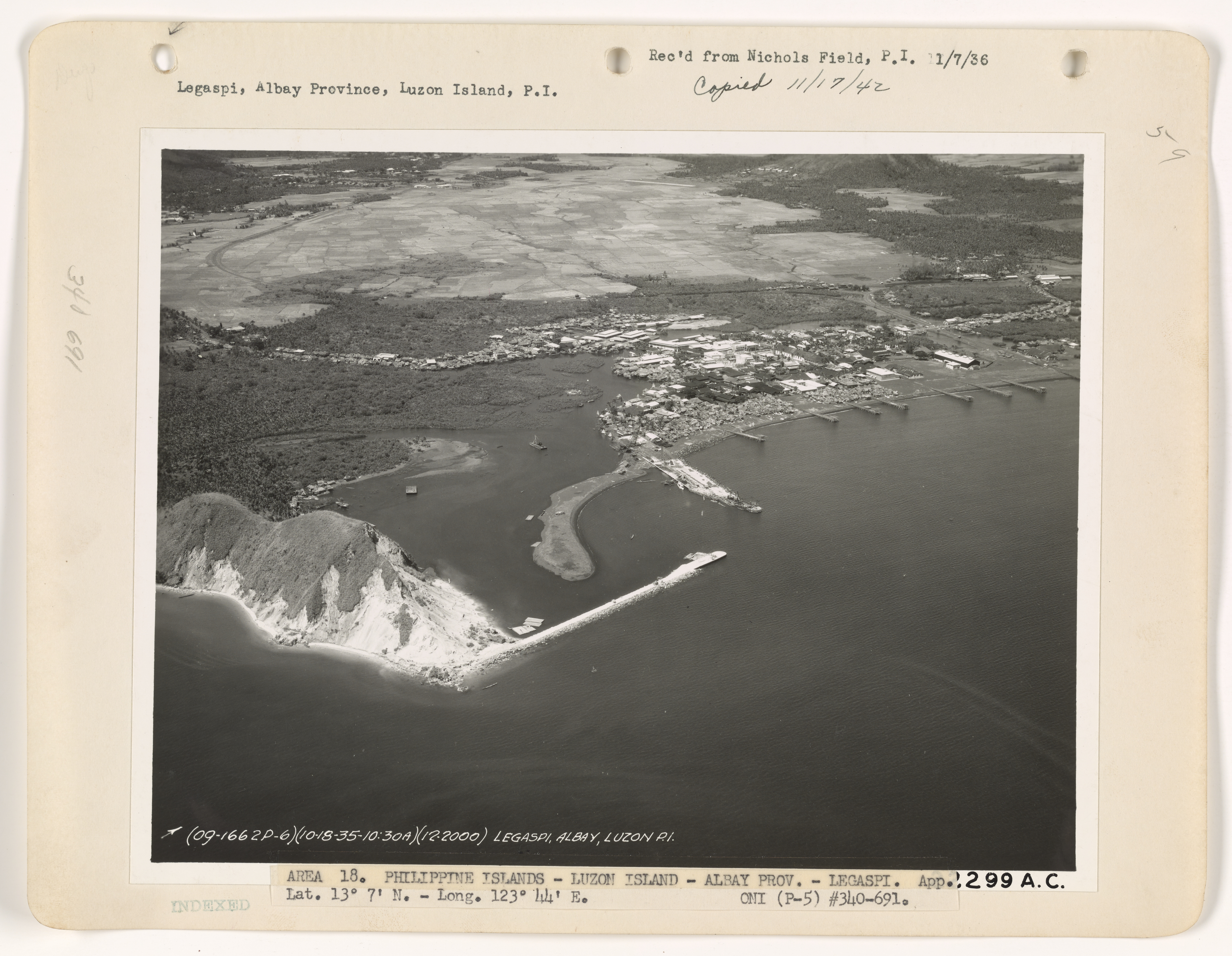
Aerial view of Legazpi, October 18, 1935

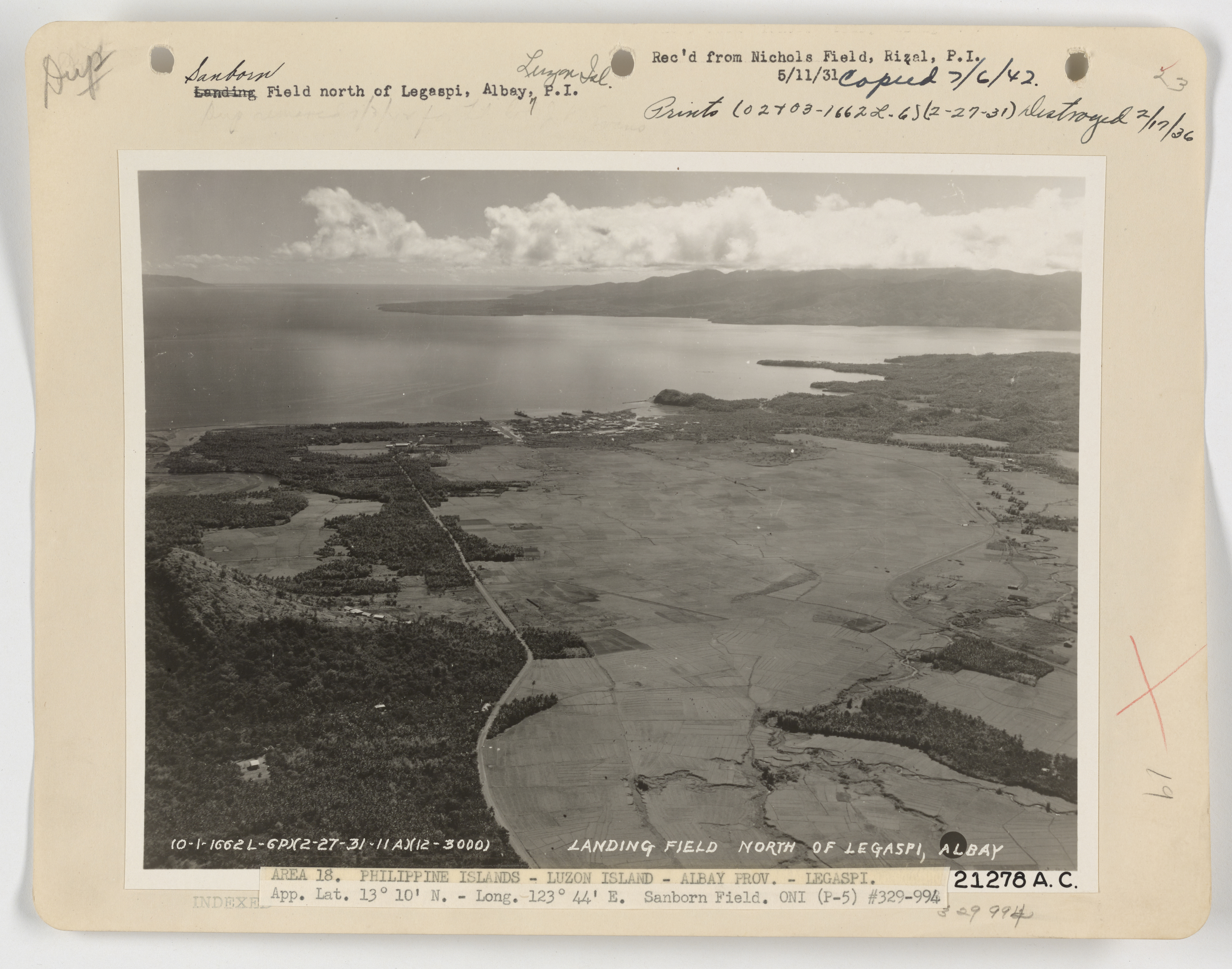
Aerial view of Legazpi City, February 27, 1931

The US military government dissolved the short-lived Spanish-era ayuntamiento and in 1908 reorganised the settlement into two separate municipalities of Legazpi Port (the coastal commercial quarter) and Albay (the inland district that became the provincial capital). A further territorial adjustment on October 1, 1922 restored the independence of Daraga, which had been administratively merged with Albay since the nineteenth century.

Education expanded rapidly under American civil rule, with Albay High School opened in a Gabaldon-type school building in 1906 and the Albay Normal School established in 1921. Both institutions were later integrated into Bicol University which was formally established in 1969. The oldest Catholic educational institution in the province, St. Agnes Academy, was founded on July 1, 1912 by the Missionary Benedictine Sisters of Tutzing as Academia de Sta. Inés. It opened a secondary department in 1917 and moved to its present campus in 1920.

With peace restored, Legazpi had resumed its role as the principal abacá and copra outlet of south-eastern Luzon, helped by its connection to the Manila Railroad Company's Bicol Line. Exports of abacá from the Philippines reached an all-time peak in 1928–29, a boom that particularly benefited Bicol ports, with American colonial economic policies further encouraging local enterprise. Act No. 2475 of February 5, 1915 granted entrepreneur Julian M. Locsin a 50-year franchise to install and operate an electric light and power system in the municipality, one of the earliest such concessions outside Manila.

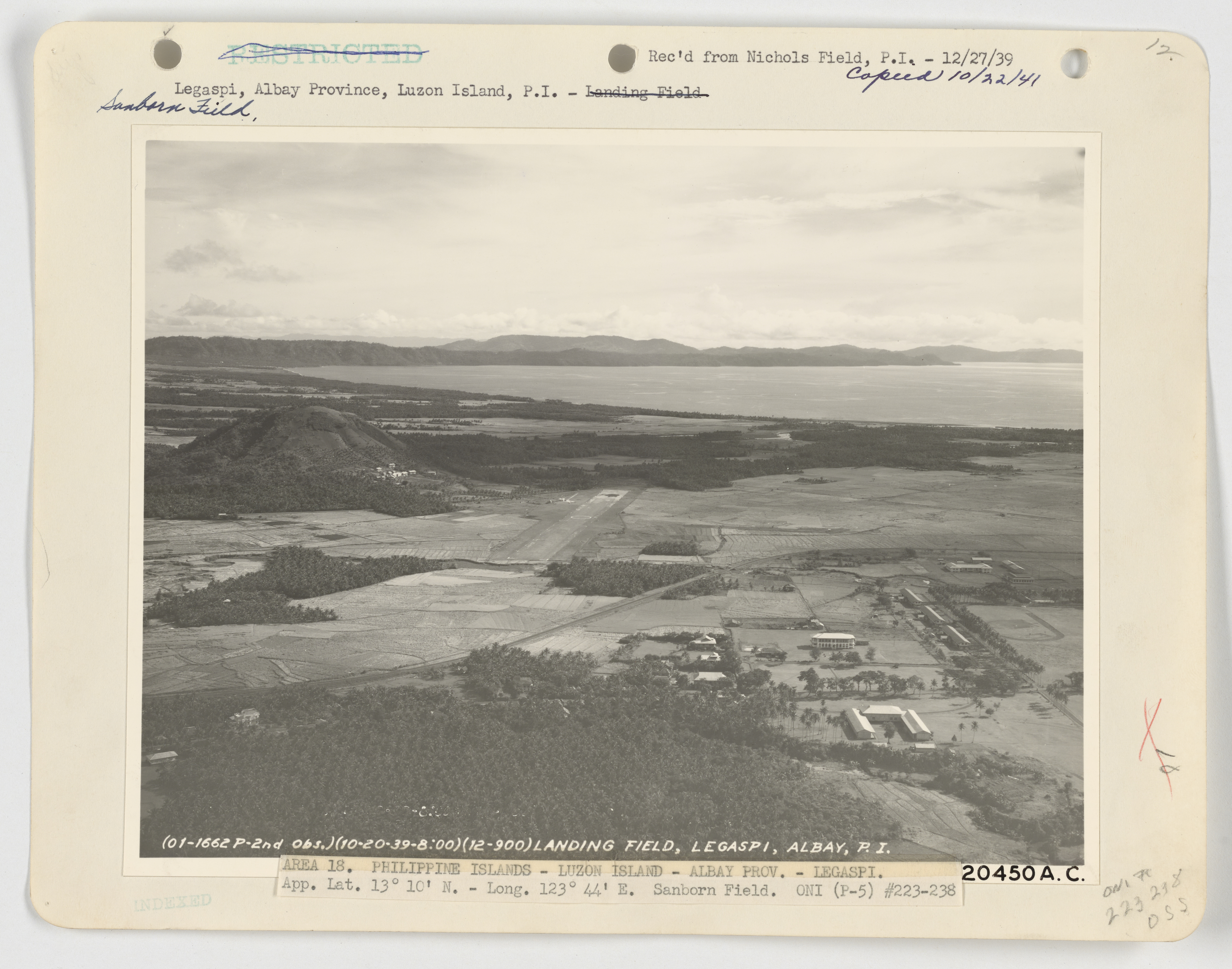
Aerial view of Sanborn Field (present-day Old Legazpi Airport), October 20, 1939

Transport links were dramatically improved in the 1930s, with the final gap in the Manila Railroad Company's South Main Line being closed on May 8, 1938 when President Manuel L. Quezon hammered in a ceremonial golden spike at Del Gallego, Camarines Sur. This formally inaugurated through passenger and freight services between Tutuban and Legazpi, the famed "Bicol Express". Air transport arrived even earlier, with Sanborn Field being laid out before 1936 just outside the poblacion (CBD) to serve pre-war civilian flights. After December 1941, it became a strategic Japanese and later Allied air base, and is the site of today's Legazpi Airport.

=== World War II (1941–1945) ===
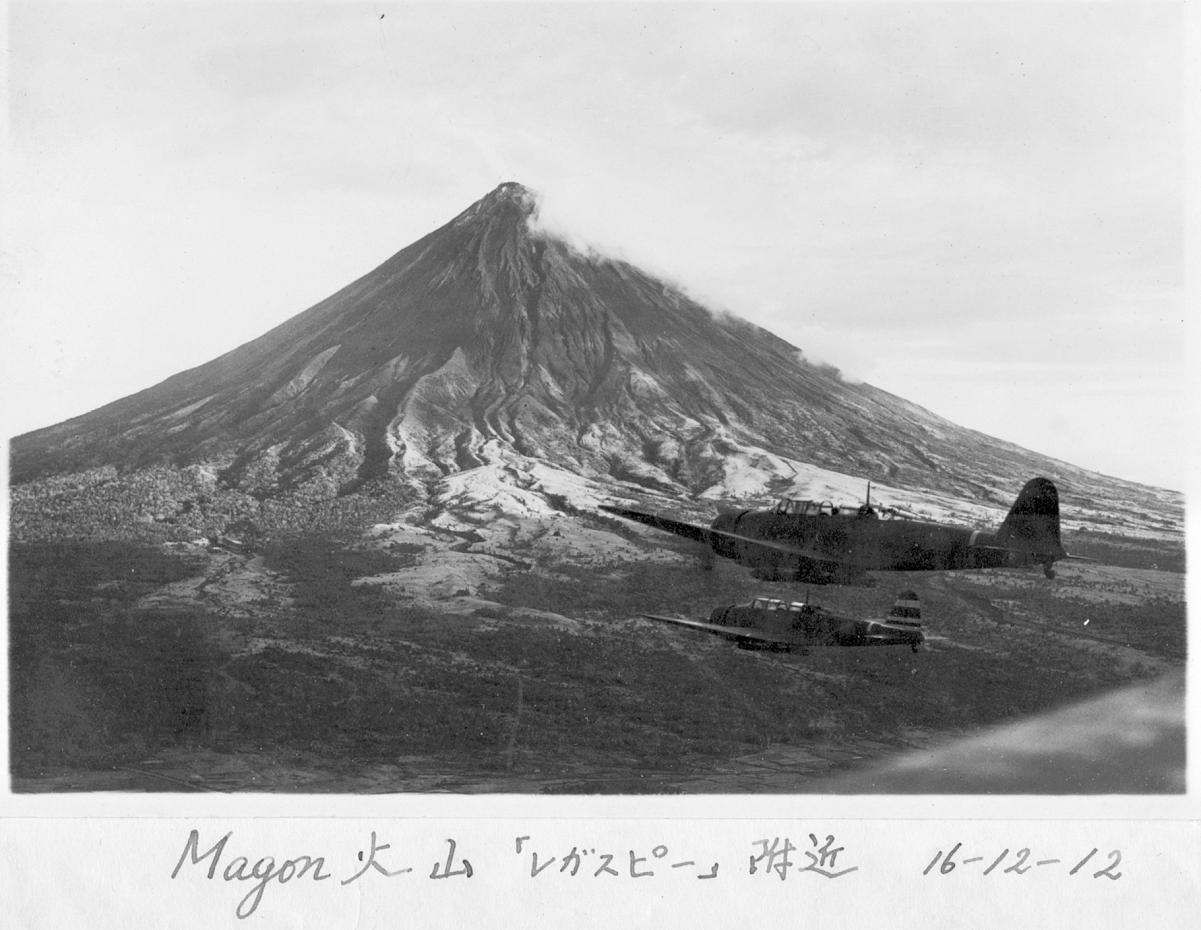
Japanese bombers from the aircraft carrier Ryujo attack Legazpi, December 12, 1941

At dawn on December 12, 1941 a vanguard force of 2,500 men of the Imperial Japanese Army (IJA) 16th Division under Major-General Naoki Kimura, backed by 575 naval infantry of the Kure 1st Special Naval Landing Force and covered at sea by the light cruiser Nagara and the carrier Ryūjō, came ashore at Legazpi without opposition. Within hours they seized Sanborn airfield and the south-coast section of the Manila-Bicol railway, giving the Japanese a forward fighter base for operations toward central Luzon and command of the strategic San Bernardino Strait. Two Far East Air Force P-40s and three B-17s struck the newly occupied strip that afternoon, destroying nine Japanese aircraft and killing several troops, but could not dislodge the garrison. The airfield later became a relay hub for Tainan Kōkūtai's A6M "Zero" fighters from December 1941 to January 1942, and for the 33rd Sentai's Ki-43 "Oscar" squadrons in 1944, while Japanese coastal convoys used Albay Gulf to bypass American submarines further north.

Japanese control seldom extended far beyond the rail line and gulf shore. In the interior, Bicolano resistance cells coalesced under officers of the pre-war Philippine Army, and by 1943 these bands were raiding supply trains, cutting telegraph lines, and funneling intelligence to Allied headquarters. The most cohesive formation around Legazpi was led by Lt. Col. Demetrio Camua, whose guerrillas guarded mountain passes south of the city and helped seal road exits before the Allied landing in early 1945.

From October 1944, the Fifth Air Force and carrier groups neutralising southern Luzon subjected Legazpi to almost-daily raids. Contemporary local accounts note up to two strikes per day as part of a broader effort to pin Japanese air units and interdict road traffic on the Bicol Peninsula. These attacks, followed by preparatory naval gunfire in March 1945, flattened much of the port district. At 08:15 on April 1, 1945 Task Group 78.4 put the 158th Regimental Combat Team ("Bushmasters") of the US 6th Army ashore at Rawis Beach. Meeting only scattered artillery fire the regiment secured the town, port, and airfield by the evening of April 2 then fanned north toward Daraga and Camalig. The advance was expedited by Camua's guerrillas, who had already isolated Japanese outposts and guided Americans through mined approaches.

The landing reopened the San Bernardino Strait to Allied shipping and marked the final amphibious assault in Luzon. But US pre-invasion air strikes and naval bombardment obliterated many 19th-century structures, notably the original St Raphael the Archangel Church (1834) and the Academia de Santa Ines complex, although both were extensively rebuilt in the late 1940s.

=== Post-war reconstruction (1945–1959) ===
==== Fluctuating city status ====
After the war, Legazpi's port and infrastructure were gradually rebuilt, and by 1946 Philippine Airlines (PAL) had begun regular commercial flights linking Legazpi to Manila, marking the city's emergence as the gateway to southern Luzon. On July 18, 1948 Legazpi became a chartered city for the second time when the municipalities of Legazpi and Daraga were merged under Republic Act No. 306, and President Elpidio Quirino appointed Jose R. Arboleda as the first mayor of the new city. However, on June 8, 1954 Republic Act No. 993 dissolved the city and Legazpi and Daraga reverted to being separate towns again.

In October 1952, Typhoon Trix hit southern Luzon with winds of over 220 km/h, virtually destroying Legazpi and ravaging nearby towns. The storm caused catastrophic floods and damage in Albay, with hundreds of residents killed in the region. Despite these setbacks, Legazpi rebuilt in the aftermath and continued to grow as a provincial capital, and by the end of the 1950s cityhood was restored. Republic Act No. 2234 was approved on June 12, 1959, re-establishing Legazpi as a city for the third time, with this 1959 charter remaining the foundation of Legazpi's status up to the present. Upon its re-incorporation Mayor Ramon A. Arnaldo – who had been serving as town mayor since 1954 – became the first city mayor under the new charter, marking the start of modern Legazpi. Subsequent amendments, such as RA 5525, fine-tuned the city's charter in the 1960s.

==== Urban growth ====
During the 1960s, Legazpi solidified its role as the Bicol region's urban center, with regular Philippine National Railways service and improved roads strengthening its connectivity and spurring commerce and tourism. In the late 1960s, the "jet age" arrived when PAL introduced BAC One-Eleven jet flights on the Manila–Legazpi route.

The 1960s also marked Legazpi's emergence as a regional hub for higher education. Legazpi Junior College, founded on June 8, 1948, was transferred to the administration of the Dominican Order on July 1, 1965. The institution was approved for elevation to university status by Secretary of Education Carlos P. Romulo, and the University Charter for Aquinas University of Legazpi was signed by Acting Secretary Onofre Corpuz on August 30, 1968, formally established the institution. The following year, Republic Act No. 5521 of June 21, 1969 established Bicol University by integrating six existing government-run educational institutions located in Legazpi, Daraga, and neighboring towns in Albay.

==== Mayon Volcano eruption (1968) ====
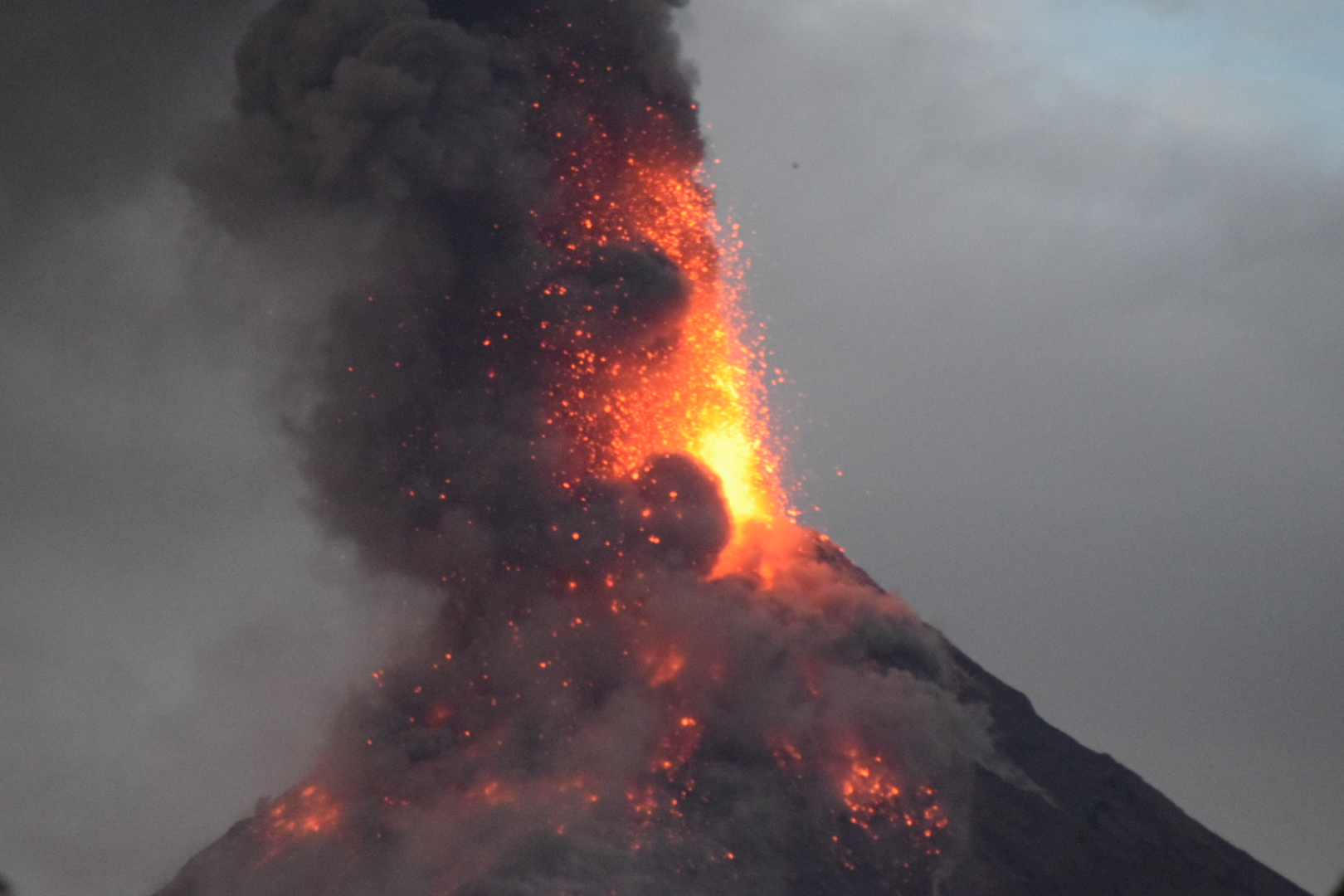
Mayon Volcano eruption 2018

Beginning on April 21, 1968 Mayon Volcano unleashed a series of over 100 explosive eruptions, sending pyroclastic flows and lava down its slopes and columns of ash and smoke up to ten kilometres high. An area of 100 square kilometers, including areas of Legazpi, was blanketed in ash and debris, with at least six people killed by the eruption and thousands forced to evacuate.

==== Super Typhoon Sening (1970) ====
Two years later, in mid-October 1970, Super Typhoon Sening (international name Joan) roared through Bicol with sustained winds estimated at 275 km/h, making it the most intense typhoon on record in the Philippines at the time. Legazpi was among the hardest hit areas, with the typhoon causing devastation across Albay province and knocking out power lines and communications in Legazpi for weeks. Over 700 deaths were reported across the region, and together with the extensive property losses it was one of the worst typhoons in Bicol's history.

=== Martial-law era (1970–1985) ===
When President Ferdinand E. Marcos proclaimed Martial Law in September 1972, he simultaneously issued Presidential Decree No. 1 adopting the Integrated Reorganization Plan (IRP). Part IV of the IRP grouped the six Bicol provinces into Region V and formally designated Legazpi as its administrative centre and regional capital. To give the new bureaucracy a physical seat, Proclamation No. 1676 of October 8, 1977 reserved a tract of land in Barangay Rawis for the Bicol Regional Government Center, leading to the transfer to Legazpi or construction anew of regional offices for the Department of Education, Bureau of Customs, National Economic and Development Authority, and many other agencies over the next decade. During this period, Legazpi also received national and international attention when Pope John Paul II included the city in his first pastoral visit to the Philippines. On February 21, 1981 he celebrated a eucharistic mass outside St. Gregory the Great Cathedral in downtown Legazpi, delivering a homily to Legazpi's predominantly agricultural constituency on the dignity and contributions of rural workers.

In September 1984, Legazpi was struck by two major natural disasters. On September 1, Typhoon Nitang (Ike) battered the Albay Gulf coast with winds of over 150 km/h, and days later Mayon Volcano erupted in a Strombolian–Vulcanian event, sending pyroclastic flows down its southeastern flank and toward the city from September 9 to October 6.

=== Post-EDSA and the 1990s (1986-1990s) ===
After the 1986 EDSA Revolution, President Corazon C. Aquino issued Executive Order No. 17 of May 28, 1986 which installed interim town officers until elections were held in 1988, when Benjamin S. Imperial was elected as mayor. A year earlier Super Typhoon Sisang (Nina) had sent floods crashing through barangays, killing 77 in Albay province.

==== First female mayor ====
Imelda Crisol Roces became mayor of Legazpi in December 1991 following the death of Mayor Benjamin S. Imperial, thereby becoming the city's first female chief executive. She launched the inaugural Ibalong Festival in October 1992 which was based on the pre-Hispanic Ibalong epic. Aimed at promoting cultural heritage and tourism, the festival was also conceived as a symbol of the resilience of Albayanos in the face of frequent natural calamities. The festival's concept was proposed by Merito B. Espinas (1928–2002) – a Bicolano scholar and professor at Aquinas University (now University of Sto. Tomas-Legazpi) – who had authored the first English translation of the Ibalong and was instrumental in framing it as the basis for a civic festival. His academic work on Bicol literature helped shape the cultural identity the festival continues to celebrate.

Four months later, Mayon Volcano erupted on February 2, 1993, killing 75 people and driving more than 45,000 residents into 43 evacuation centres. This resulted in the formation of the Albay Public Safety and Emergency Management Office (APSEMO) in 1995, the country's first permanent disaster risk-reduction office.

==== Development in the 1990s ====
During Roces' administration, the city implemented urban renewal and Clean-and-Green programs. In 1997 the 1920s-era Plaza Real park near the city port was rehabilitated with new water features, resurfaced walkways, and a garden wall fronting St. Raphael Church, thereby restoring its role as a civic landmark. On the infrastructure front the city secured funding from the Department of Public Works and Highways (DPWH) to widen and extend Tahao Road, creating a north-south corridor identified in the 1999–2008 Comprehensive Land Use Plan as an emerging "Alternative Business District." In 2013, the road was renamed Imelda C. Roces Avenue under City Ordinance 0007–2013 in recognition of its contribution to commercial development in the area, with the alternate road bisecting Roces Avenue named Benjamin Imperial Street in recognition of her predecessor.

To support economic recovery, the city also initiated the Legazpi City Investment Incentive Code of 1996 under S.P. Ordinance 96-016 which offered real property tax holidays, fee waivers, and skills-training grants to investors in designated growth areas. In 1998, the city secured the issuance of Proclamation No. 1249 of June 9, 1998 declaring a 33-hectare site in Sitio Caridad, Banquerohan as the Legazpi City Special Economic Zone, a PEZA-registered area offering both local and national investment incentives.

=== Modernization and urban renewal (early 2000s) ===
In the early 2000s, Legazpi initiated a program of economic modernization and infrastructure development after the 2001 local elections marked the end of Mayor Imelda C. Roces' decade-long administration and the beginning of Mayor Noel Ebriega Rosal's tenure. Rosal prioritized investment in urban infrastructure, tourism promotion, and disaster-resilient planning, in response to the city's exposure to typhoons and volcanic activity. In 2001, the Landco Business Park was inaugurated as the first master-planned commercial district in the Bicol Region intended to attract business investments. During this period, Legazpi also experienced a rise in private sector growth with the opening of its first full-sized shopping malls, upgrades to its road network, and redevelopment of public markets.

Legazpi's disaster management systems were significantly challenged in late 2006 when the city was struck by two successive super typhoons – Typhoon Milenyo (Xangsane) in September and Typhoon Reming (Durian) in November – with Typhoon Reming caused extensive damage across Albay province. In Legazpi heavy rainfall triggered the movement of volcanic debris from Mayon Volcano, resulting in deadly lahars that buried several villages including Barangay Padang. Six hundred people died across the province due to the disaster, with Legazpi among the most severely affected areas.

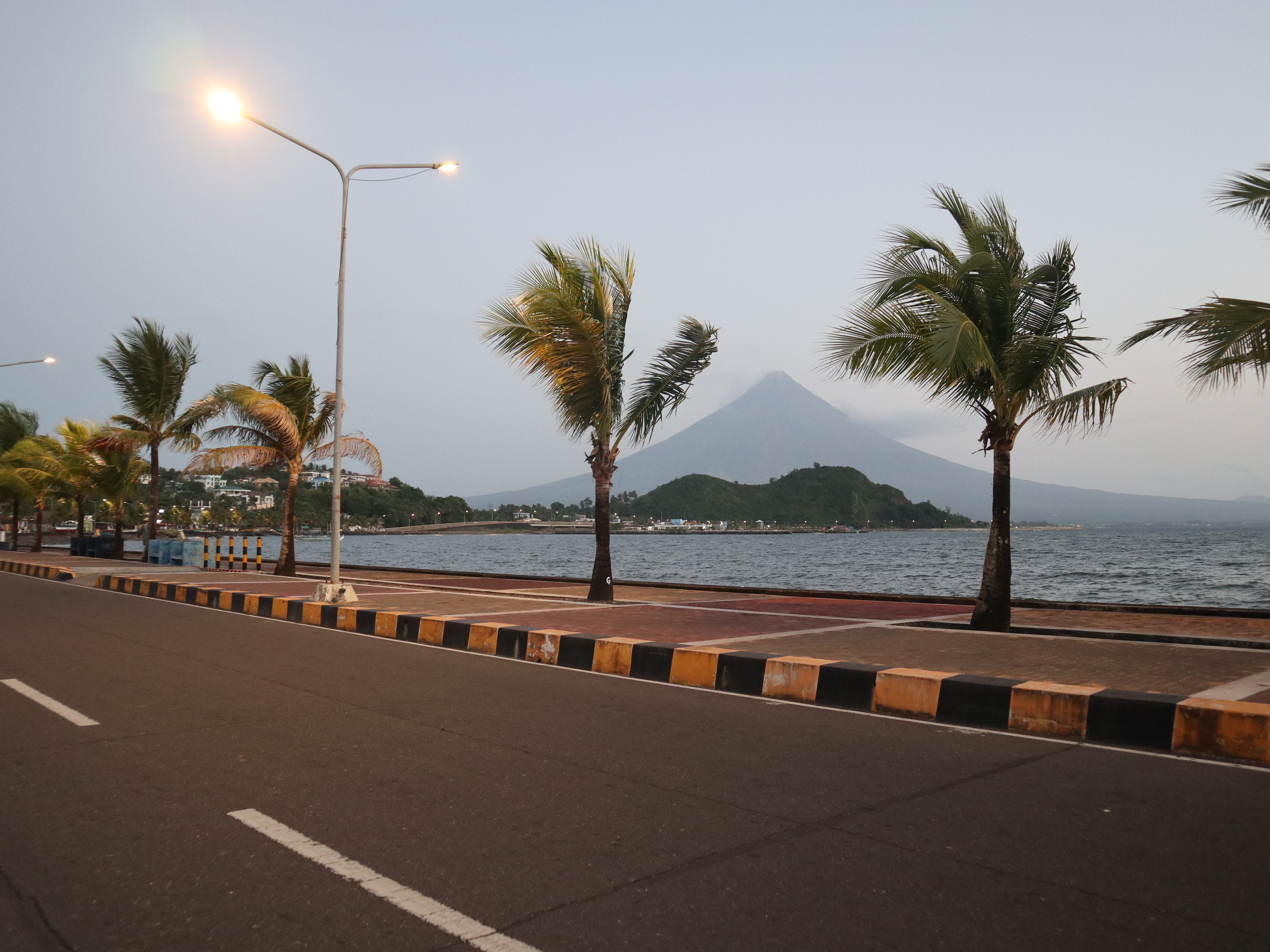
Legazpi Boulevard

Following the 2006 disaster, city and provincial authorities implemented a range of rehabilitation and risk mitigation measures. A multi-phase coastal infrastructure project known as Legazpi Boulevard was constructed to function both as a scenic thoroughfare and a protective seawall against storm surges and coastal flooding. The initial 4-kilometer segment stretched from the port area through Barangays Dap-dap and Puro and was completed through a public–private partnership in the early 2010s. Additional flood control structures, including dikes and improved drainage systems, were developed along the lahar and flood-prone rivers and coastal areas. By 2007, Albay Province and Legazpi had adopted a comprehensive Climate Change Adaptation and Disaster Risk Reduction (CCA-DRR) strategy, with the initiative cited by the National Disaster Risk Reduction and Management Council (NDRRMC) as a model for effective local disaster governance.

=== Infrastructure growth (2009–2015) ===
By the late 2000s, Legazpi had experienced notable economic growth, leading to a surge in construction activity. In 2009, the city inaugurated the Embarcadero de Legazpi, a waterfront commercial and entertainment complex built on reclaimed land near the port area which included an information technology park, the first IT ecozone in the Bicol Region. The complex featured retail establishments, restaurants, and a marina, and also accommodated business process outsourcing (BPO) firms such as Sutherland Global Services. That same year the city inaugurated the Legazpi Grand Central Terminal, a modern integrated transport facility developed through a public–private partnership (PPP). Constructed under a Build–operate–transfer (BOT) arrangement without direct expenditure from the city government, the terminal became a recognized model for successful local PPP implementation. The project earned Legazpi a Galing Pook Award which recognized it as one of the ten most outstanding local governance programs in the Philippines.

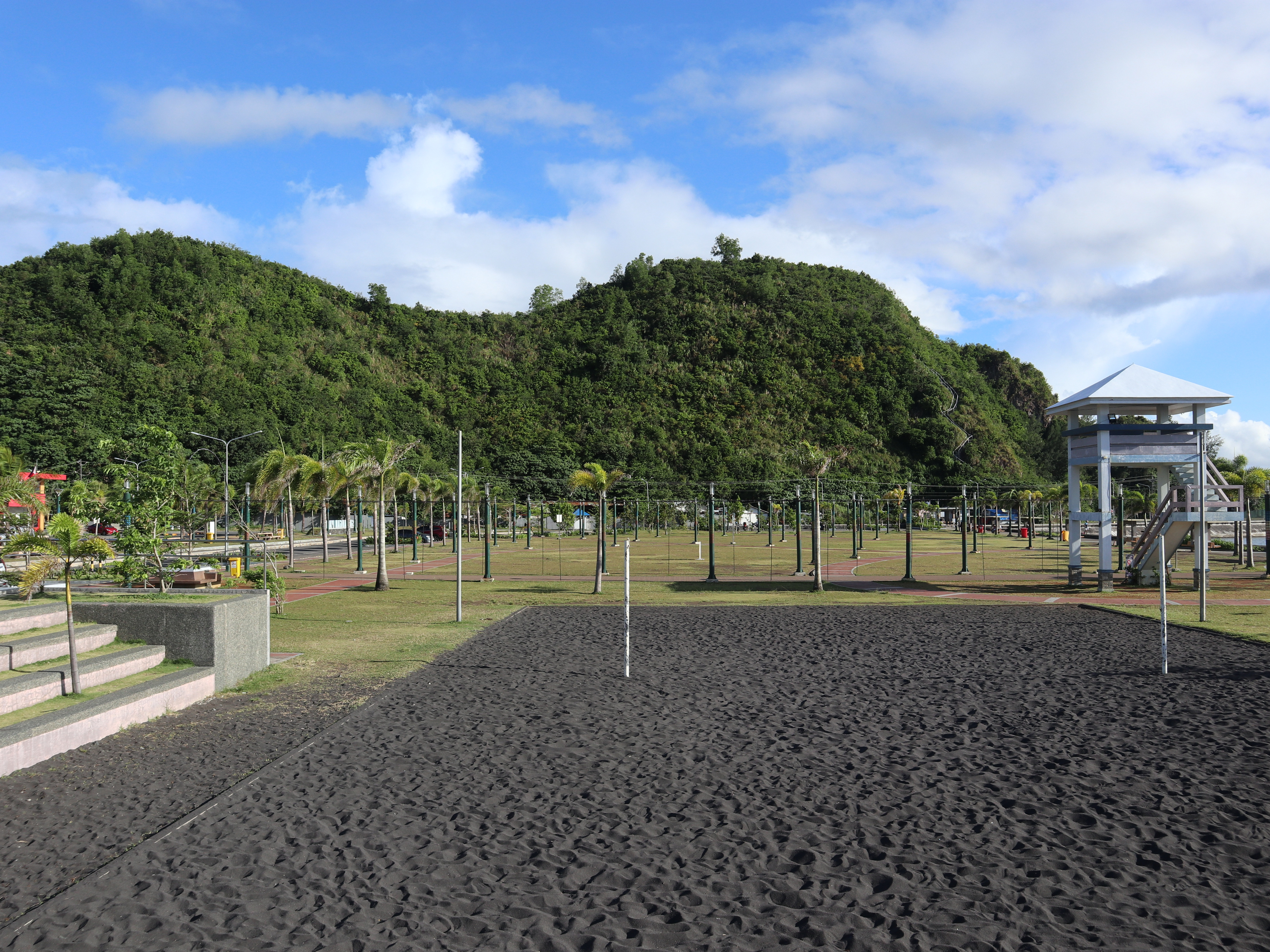
Sawangan Park

A public park and promenade known as Sawangan Park was later developed in Barangay Dap-dap along the Legazpi Boulevard. Inaugurated in the late 2010s, the park featured landscaped areas, recreational facilities, and views of Mayon Volcano and Albay Gulf. Beginning in 2017, the boulevard underwent a 2.7 kilometer expansion traversing the coastal barangays of Sabang, Pigcale, Baybay, and San Roque. The ₱2.1-billion project was implemented in partnership with the Department of Public Works and Highways (DPWH) and included the construction of a seawall, a four-lane road with bike lanes, and a 380-meter bridge, all designed to reduce flood risk and improve access to northern Albay.

In southern Legazpi an 18-kilometer concrete highway was constructed to connect the upland barangays of Buenavista, Cagbacong, and nearby communities with the city center, as well as facilitate access to the new airport in Daraga. Also in 2014, Legazpi placed second in the national Livable Cities Design Challenge which evaluated cities on urban planning and disaster resilience.

=== Private sector boom (2016–2019) ===
Ayala Malls Legazpi

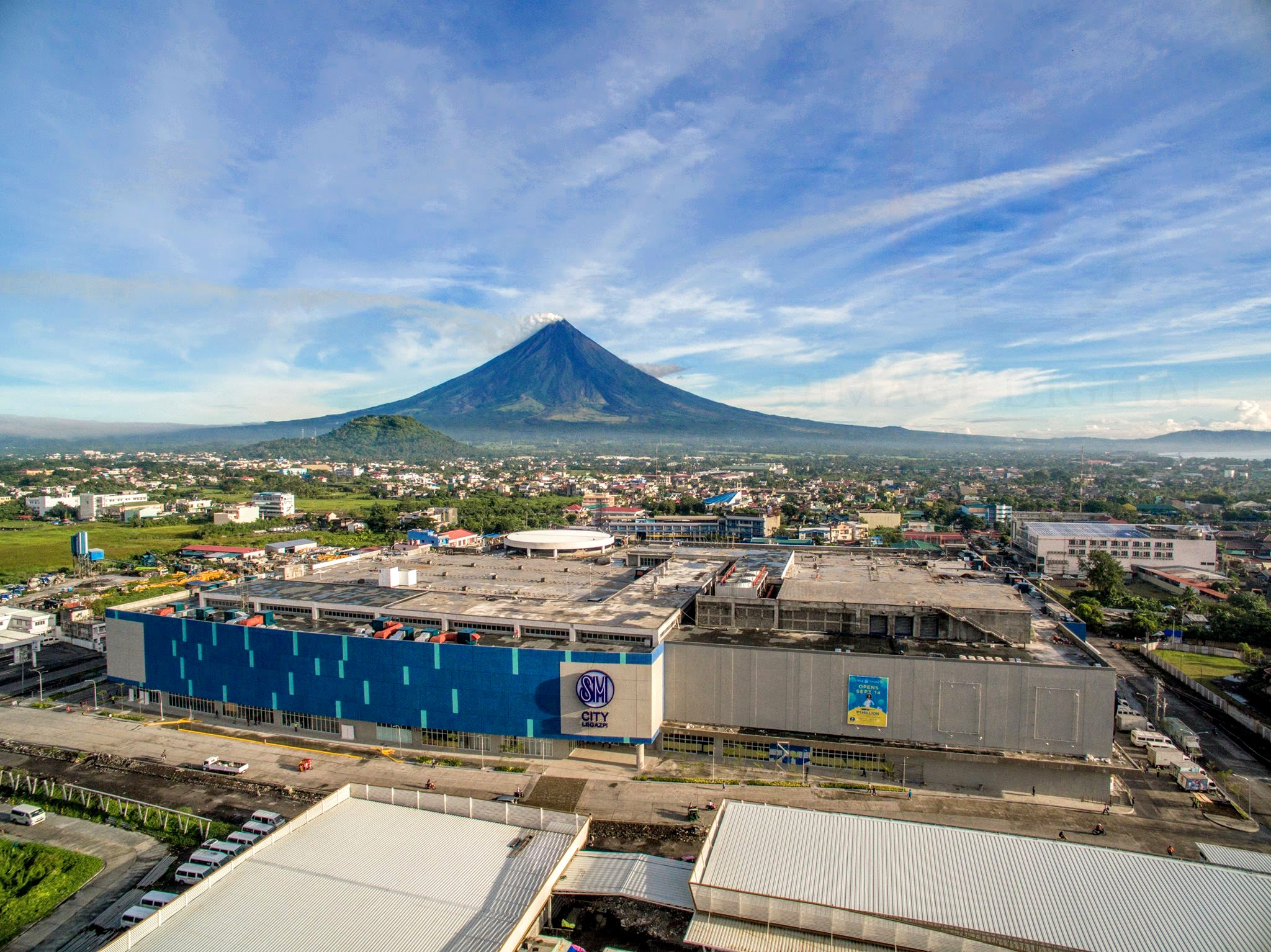
SM City Legazpi

Private sector investment in Legazpi increased significantly in the 2010s. In 2016 Ayala Land partnered with the local LCC Group to open Ayala Malls Legazpi–Liberty City Center, a four-story shopping complex on the site of the former public market and Ayala's first mall in the Bicol Region. In the same year SM Prime Holdings began construction of SM City Legazpi, an 87,000 square meter shopping mall located beside the city's bus terminal. When the mall opened on September 14, 2018 it was the largest retail complex in Bicol. This entry of national retail developers into Legazpi was accompanied by growth in the hospitality, residential, and franchising sectors, with public infrastructure expanding in parallel. In 2018 Legazpi opened the Legazpi City Hospital, the city's first public hospital. That same year a ₱100-million engineered sanitary landfill was completed in Barangay Banquerohan, one of the first modern waste management facilities in the region.

On October 7, 2021 the Bicol International Airport was inaugurated in Daraga, Albay, replacing the old Legazpi domestic airport. Although located outside the city proper it functions as Legazpi's primary air gateway and enhances regional connectivity.

In 2018, the Philippine Chamber of Commerce and Industry named Legazpi the Most Business-Friendly City (Component City category), citing its streamlined business registration processes and investor-oriented governance. That same year, the city ranked first in the National Competitiveness Council (NCC)'s competitiveness index for component cities after previously placing third in 2016 and fifth in 2017. According to media reports and NCC assessments, Legazpi's performance was attributed in part to its infrastructure investments following major disasters, particularly in flood control and urban planning. Legazpi has consistently passed the Seal of Good Local Governance administered by the Department of the Interior and Local Government.

=== Developments in the 2020s ===
By 2020, the number of registered business establishments in Legazpi had increased to over 6,000 with annual local government revenue exceeding ₱1 billion. City officials subsequently expressed interest in pursuing the reclassification of Legazpi into a Highly Urbanized City (HUC), noting that the city had met the population and income criteria for HUC status based on the 2020 census.

A shift in political leadership occurred following the May 2022 elections when then-mayor Noel Rosal was elected governor of Albay and his wife Geraldine Rosal became mayor of Legazpi. Both were later disqualified by the Commission on Elections (COMELEC) for violating campaign spending regulations. Noel Rosal was removed from office in late 2022, followed by Geraldine Rosal's removal between 2023 and 2024. Vice Mayor Oscar Cristobal briefly served as acting mayor until former Ako Bicol party-list representative Alfredo Garbin Jr. assumed the mayoralty in late 2024. In the 2025 Philippine general election, Hisham Ismail, former barangay captain of Cabangan‑West and president of the city's Liga ng mga Barangay, was elected mayor of Legazpi, becoming the youngest chief executive in the city's history.

Infrastructure development continued with the newly opened Bicol International Airport improving regional air connectivity and the redevelopment of the former domestic airport improving government and commercial services. And by 2023 the construction of an international cruise terminal to accommodate large cruise vessels and support the city's tourism sector had commenced. Ongoing urban development projects included the expansion of flood control infrastructure and drainage systems and the construction of a 1,000-room permanent evacuation center in Barangay Homapon, originally announced in 2018 to serve residents in high-risk areas near Mayon Volcano. Discussions on the reclassification of Legazpi into an HUC have remained active, with local leaders citing the potential for greater administrative autonomy and increased fiscal allocations.

== Geography ==
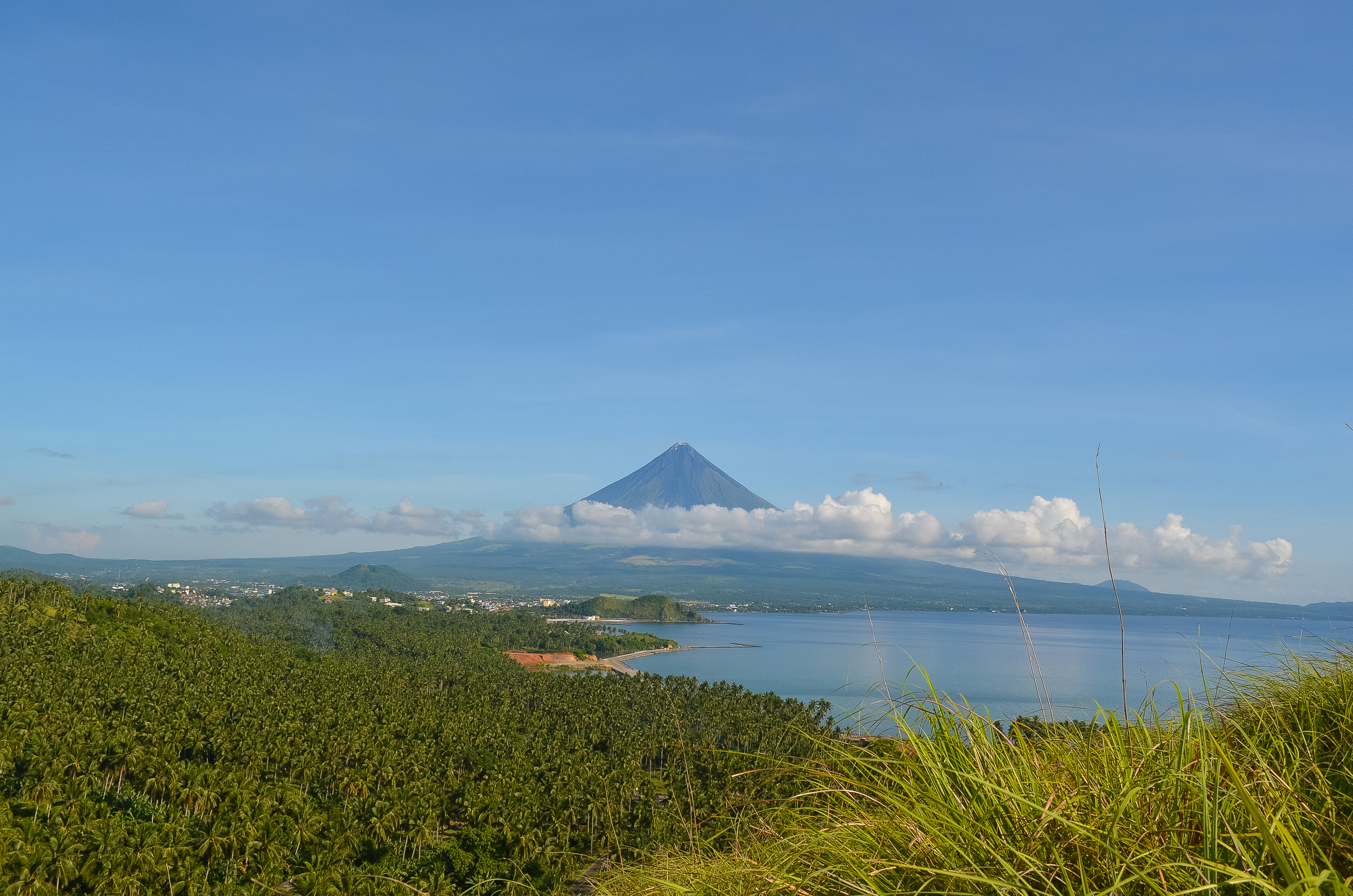
View to the north from Barangay Lamba located in the hilly southern areas of Legazpi

=== Location and size ===
Legazpi is in the eastern portion of the province of Albay, bounded on the north by the municipality of Santo Domingo, on the east by Albay Gulf, on the west by the municipality of Daraga, and on the south by the municipalities of Manito in Albay, and Pilar and Castilla in Sorsogon. The city is 527 kilometres (327 mi) south of Manila.

From north to south, the city spans 29 kilometers, while from east to west the narrowest portion is 3 kilometers (the urban district) and the widest is 15 kilometers (the southeast area). Legazpi has a total land area of 20,437 hectares, of which 90 percent is classified as rural (18,431.66 hectares) and 10 percent is classified as urban (2,005.39 hectares).

=== Topography ===
Legazpi's topography is generally plain-like in the northeastern areas, with slopes ranging from five to fifteen degrees, while the southern areas have mostly rolling to hilly terrain. In the city's coastal areas the terrain varies from plain (north) to hilly (south). Legazpi is criss-crossed by several rivers including the Tibu, Macabalo, and Yawa, with a number of swampy areas, particularly in the urban district. To mitigate flooding in these low-lying areas, the local government has built an urban drainage and flood control system consisting of dikes, canals, sea walls, and three pumping stations located in Barangays San Roque, Bay-Bay, and Victory Village.

=== Climate ===
Legazpi features a tropical rainforest climate with noticeably wetter and drier periods of the year. However, the city's driest month of April still sees an average of over 150 millimetres (5.9 in) of precipitation during the month. Similar to many other cities with this climate, temperatures are relatively constant throughout the course of the year with a mean annual average of 26.9 °C (80.4 °F). The coolest month is January with a daily mean of 25.3 °C (77.5 °F) and the hottest months are May and June, both with a daily mean of 28.1 °C (82.6 °F). The all-time record high temperature was 37.7 °C (99.9 °F) on May 27, 1968 and the all-time record low temperature was 13.9 °C (57.0 °F) on February 28, 1971.

Climate data for Legazpi (1991–2020, extremes 1903–2023)
Month	Jan	Feb	Mar	Apr	May	Jun	Jul	Aug	Sep	Oct	Nov	Dec	Year
Record high °C (°F)	32.7 (90.9)	33.7 (92.7)	35.0 (95.0)	36.5 (97.7)	37.7 (99.9)	37.6 (99.7)	36.6 (97.9)	36.9 (98.4)	36.0 (96.8)	35.3 (95.5)	34.4 (93.9)	33.2 (91.8)	37.7 (99.9)
Mean daily maximum °C (°F)	28.9 (84.0)	29.4 (84.9)	30.2 (86.4)	31.7 (89.1)	32.5 (90.5)	32.3 (90.1)	31.5 (88.7)	31.5 (88.7)	31.5 (88.7)	31.1 (88.0)	30.4 (86.7)	29.4 (84.9)	30.9 (87.6)
Daily mean °C (°F)	26.1 (79.0)	26.3 (79.3)	27.0 (80.6)	28.2 (82.8)	29.0 (84.2)	28.8 (83.8)	28.2 (82.8)	28.3 (82.9)	28.1 (82.6)	27.8 (82.0)	27.4 (81.3)	26.7 (80.1)	27.7 (81.9)
Mean daily minimum °C (°F)	23.3 (73.9)	23.3 (73.9)	23.9 (75.0)	24.8 (76.6)	25.6 (78.1)	25.3 (77.5)	24.9 (76.8)	25.0 (77.0)	24.8 (76.6)	24.4 (75.9)	24.4 (75.9)	24.0 (75.2)	24.5 (76.1)
Record low °C (°F)	17.0 (62.6)	16.0 (60.8)	17.0 (62.6)	16.7 (62.1)	17.1 (62.8)	18.9 (66.0)	15.8 (60.4)	19.4 (66.9)	19.0 (66.2)	17.2 (63.0)	17.9 (64.2)	13.9 (57.0)	13.9 (57.0)
Average rainfall mm (inches)	346.5 (13.64)	251.0 (9.88)	232.1 (9.14)	152.0 (5.98)	197.9 (7.79)	215.9 (8.50)	281.1 (11.07)	222.5 (8.76)	279.9 (11.02)	321.9 (12.67)	450.3 (17.73)	642.0 (25.28)	3,593.1 (141.46)
Average rainy days (≥ 1 mm)	18	13	14	12	13	14	18	16	17	18	20	22	195
Average relative humidity (%)	85	84	84	82	82	83	85	84	85	86	86	87	84
Source: PAGASA

== Demographics ==
=== Population ===
According to the 2024 census, the population of Legazpi was then 210,616 people with a density of 1,400/km^{2} or 3,600/sq mi, although the daytime population is estimated to reach 350,000 due to the daily influx of students, workers, entrepreneurs, and tourists. As such, Legazpi is the most populous city in both the province of Albay and the Bicol Region, comprising 14.8% of the total population of Albay. Fifty-eight percent of the city's population (105,853) live in areas classified as urban while 42 percent (76,348) live in rural areas. Legazpi had an average annual population growth of 1.86% between 2000 and 2007 according to the 2010 census.

Population census of Legazpi

Year	Pop.	±% p.a.
1903	23,255	—
1918	52,756	+5.61%
1939	41,468	−1.14%
1948	78,828	+7.40%
1960	60,593	−2.17%
1970	84,090	+3.33%
1975	88,378	+1.00%
1980	99,766	+2.45%

Year	Pop.	±% p.a.
1990	121,116	+1.96%
1995	141,657	+2.98%
2000	157,010	+2.23%
2007	175,843	+1.57%
2010	182,201	+1.30%
2015	196,639	+1.46%
2020	209,533	+1.35%
2024	210,616	+0.12%

Source: Philippine Statistics Authority

=== Language ===
The main language spoken is Central Bikol, with English and Filipino/Tagalog also widely used and spoken.

=== Religion ===
Roman Catholicism is the predominant religion in Legazpi, and the city is the ecclesiastical seat of the Roman Catholic Diocese of Legazpi. Other religious denominations among the population include Islam, Iglesia ni Cristo, Members Church of God International, and Orthodox, as well as Protestant churches including Baptist, Methodist, Evangelical Christians, Seventh-day Adventist, Church of Jesus Christ of Latter Day Saints, and Jehovah's Witnesses.

=== Poverty ===
According to successive Philippine Statistics Authority data, the incidence of poverty in Legazpi decreased by almost half in two decades, from 33.87% in 2000 to 17.62% in 2021. The rate reached a low of 13.78% in 2018 before edging up slightly amid the COVID-19 pandemic.

Poverty incidence of Legazpi (%)

Source: Philippine Statistics Authority

== Economy ==
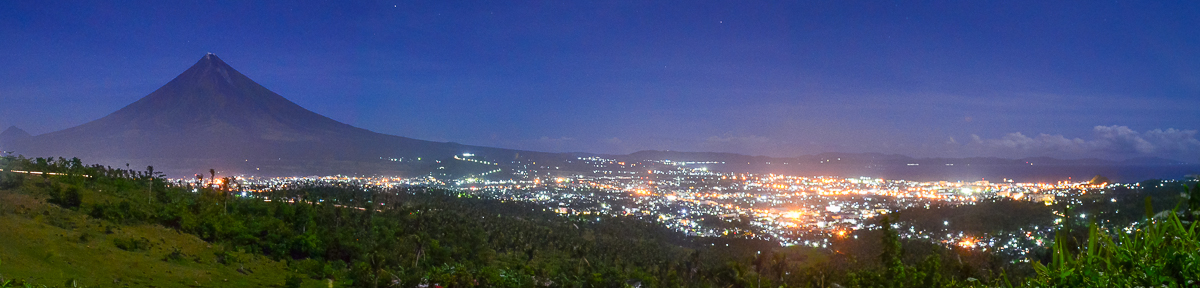
Legazpi at night, view from Barangay Estanza

Legazpi is one of the major economic hubs in the Bicol Region, hosting a large concentration of businesses and serving as a focal point for tourism, transportation, education, health services, and commerce. The city's economy is diversified across various sectors including agriculture, wholesale and retail trade, services, manufacturing, and small-scale mining, and Legazpi is an important regional center for service delivery and logistics.

Classified by the Department of Finance as a first-class component city under Department Order 074-2024, Legazpi falls within the category of Philippine cities with average regular incomes exceeding ₱1.3 billion. According to the 2024 Statement of Receipts and Expenditures data from the Bureau of Local Government Finance, Legazpi generated ₱824.02 million in locally sourced revenue for fiscal year 2024, the highest among Bicol's component cities.

=== Agriculture ===
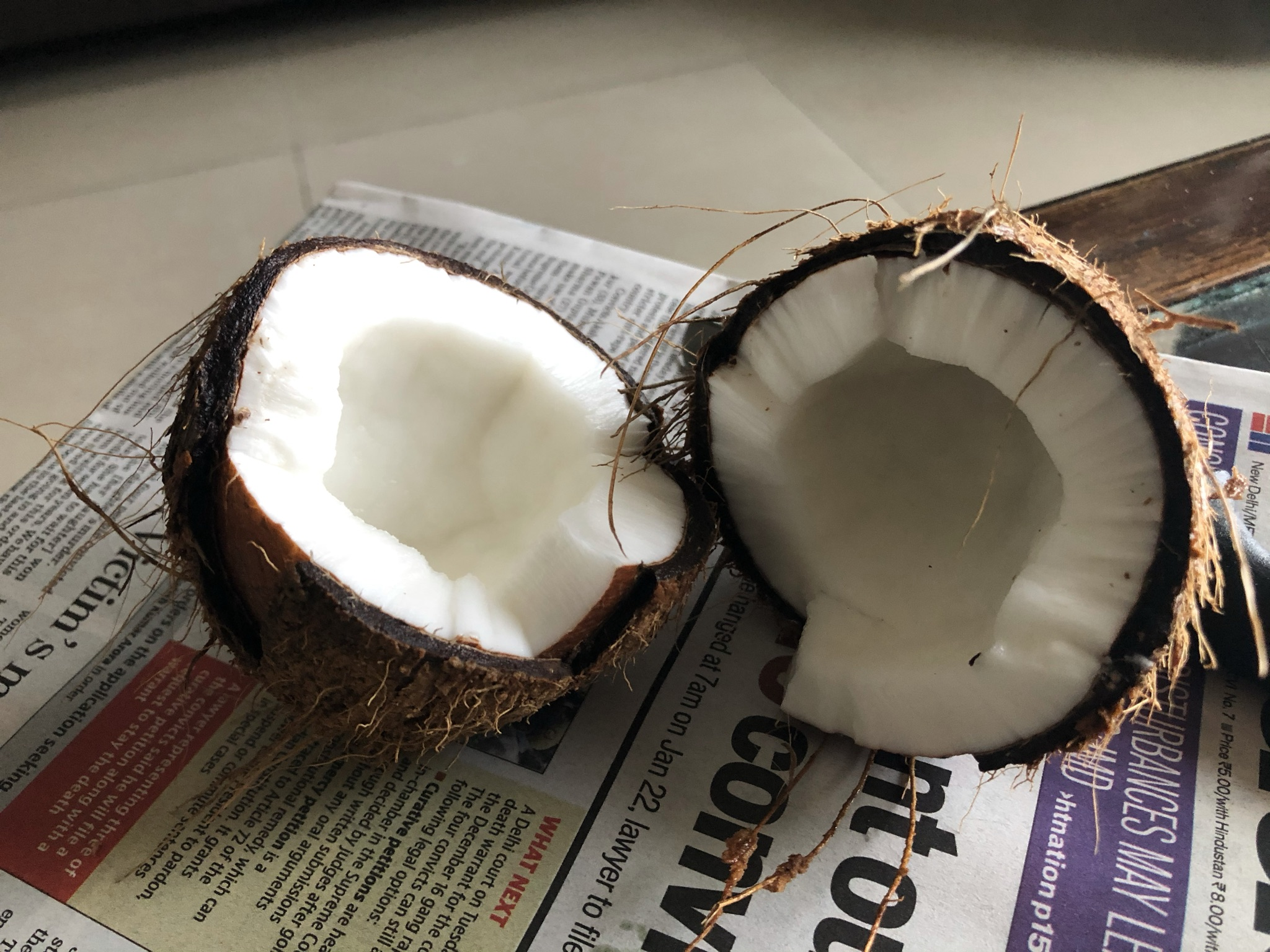
Coconut, a major agricultural product of Legazpi

Agriculture is a foundation of Legazpi's economy with the city and surrounding areas producing coconut, pili nuts (canarium ovatum) abaca fiber ("Manila hemp"), rice, corn, and various root crops as well as banana, jackfruit, and vegetables. Legazpi hosts the Legaspi Oil Company, a major coconut oil mill established in 1967 that can process 100,000 metric tons of copra annually, putting coconut products such as crude coconut oil and copra meal among Legazpi's top exports. Abaca fiber from Legazpi is used in traditional woven textiles called pinukpok, and local cooperatives in Barangay Banquerohan participate in abaca processing to add value to this export crop. Bicol is also the Philippines' leading source of pili nuts, accounting for 90% of national production.

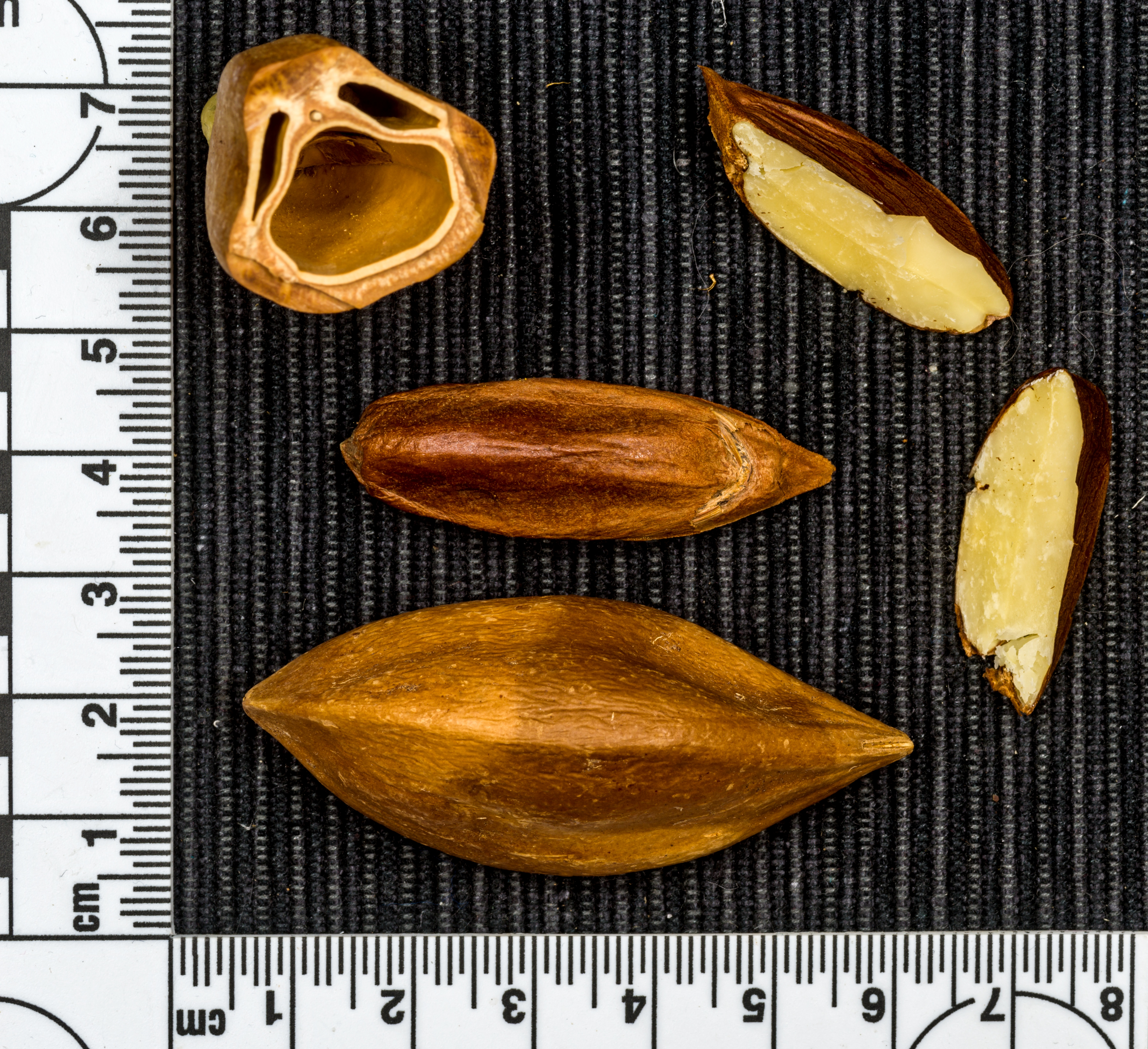
Pili nut

Legazpi's coastal communities along Albay Gulf are engaged primarily in commercial fishing, while the city's natural resources provide the basis for mining and quarrying activities. Deposits of perlite, a volcanic glass utilized in construction and horticulture, are extracted and processed in the Legazpi area for export. Sand, gravel, and other aggregates quarried from the slopes of Mt. Mayon supply the construction industry.

=== Trade and industry ===
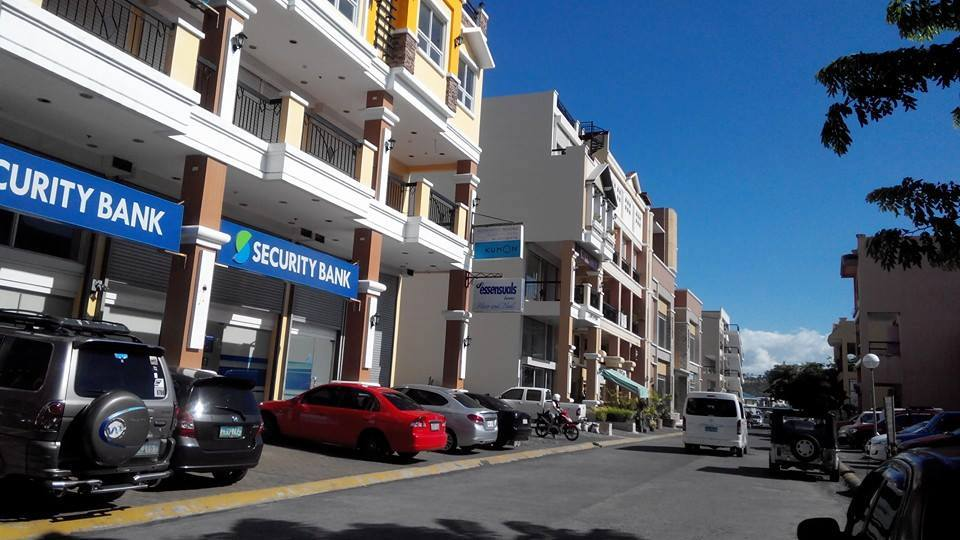
Landco Business Park

==== Business enterprises ====
Legazpi's economic activity is concentrated in the primary commercial area of the Legazpi Port District. In 2023, the city's Business Permits and Licensing Office recorded 6,330 registered businesses with total investments valued at ₱571.35 million, a 21.73% increase on 2021. The majority of these businesses are micro, small, and medium enterprises (MSMEs) engaged primarily in retail and services as part of Legazpi's role as a regional hub for shopping and service-based industries. To support the continued expansion of the local enterprise base, the city government has implemented an electronic Business One-Stop Shop (e-BOSS) system. The Port District also handles inter-island and limited international shipping, with exports including coconut oil, copra cake, perlite ore, and abaca fiber products. The Legazpi district of the Bureau of Customs reported a record revenue of ₱1.01 billion from January to August of 2023, this increase being attributed to the port's initial handling of bulk petroleum imports for the first time that year, as well as ongoing imports of grains, coal, and cement.

==== Shopping centers ====
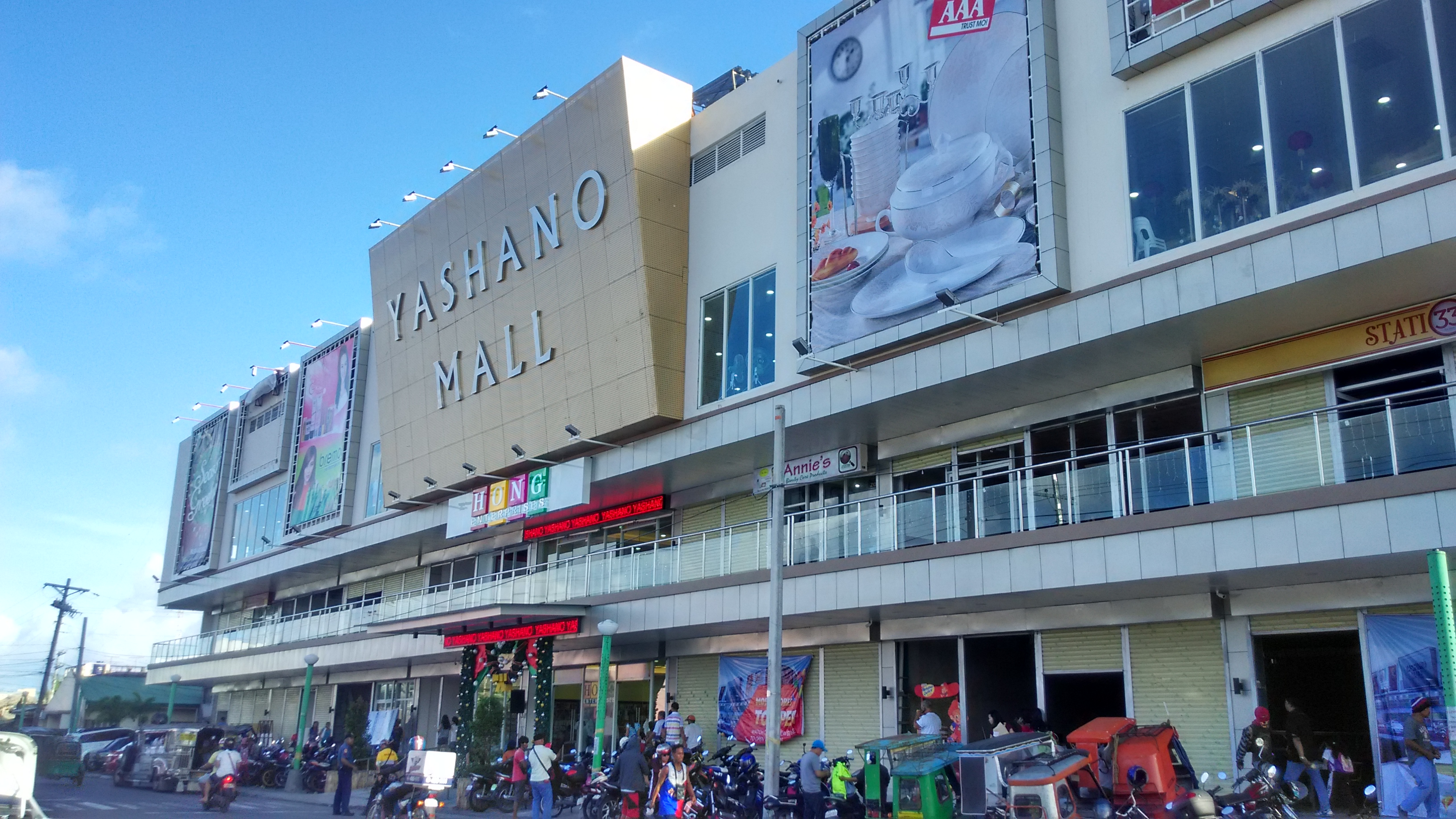
Yashano Mall

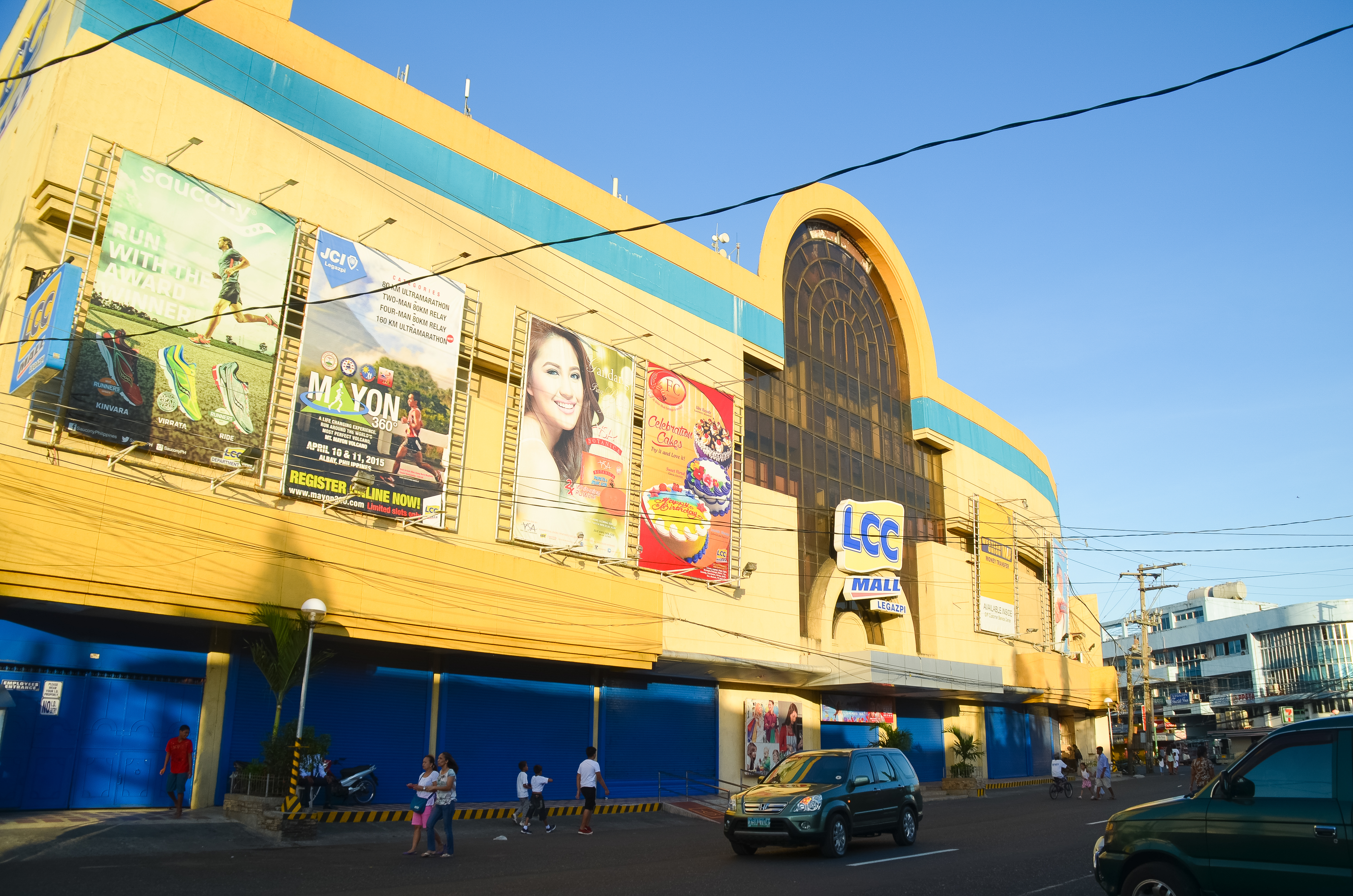
LCC Mall Legazpi

Shopping centers and public markets are prominent features of Legazpi's commercial landscape. Liberty Commercial Center, Inc. (LCC), a homegrown Albayano company established in nearby Tabaco in 1945 operates a major mall (LCC Mall Legazpi), three supermarkets, and five Expressmarts (grocery stores) in the city. The Landco Business Park adjacent to the port district opened in 2001 as the first master-planned commercial district in the Bicol Region. The 7-hectare complex includes offices, banks, restaurants, and Pacific Mall Legazpi, the region's earliest full-scale shopping mall. In recent years, other national mall developers have expanded into Legazpi, with Ayala Malls Legazpi (Liberty City Center) opening in 2016, followed by SM City Legazpi in 2018. The latter is a 3-story, 87,000 square meter complex located beside the integrated transport terminal and is SM Prime Holdings' 71st shopping mall and the largest in the Bicol Region.

Other retail centers include Yashano Mall, Embarcadero de Legazpi – a mixed-use waterfront development with an IT park – Gregorian Mall, A. Bichara Silverscreens and Entertainment Center, and 101 Shopping Center. Traditional public markets such as the Legazpi City Public Market and the Old Albay Public Market continue to serve as key venues for the trade of agricultural produce, seafood, and handicrafts. The city also operates the Ibalong Pasalubong Center, which features handicrafts and regional products such as abaca textiles, pili-based confections, and woodcrafts.

==== Investment zones ====
The government has established designated economic zones and industrial parks in Legazpi, including the Bicol Regional Agro-Industrial Center (BRAIC) and the First Legazpi Industrial Estate in Barangay Homapon, which are intended for agribusiness and light manufacturing enterprises. The Legazpi City Special Economic Zone in Banquerohan and the City Light Industrial Park (CLIP) in Barangay Bogtong have both been designated for industrial use, with the Embarcadero de Legazpi IT Park in Barangay Victory Village being a PEZA accredited IT and tourism facility. These areas offer infrastructure and investment incentives aimed at attracting factories, warehouses, and technology-oriented firms as part of a broader strategy to diversify the local economy beyond agriculture and services.

=== Tourism ===
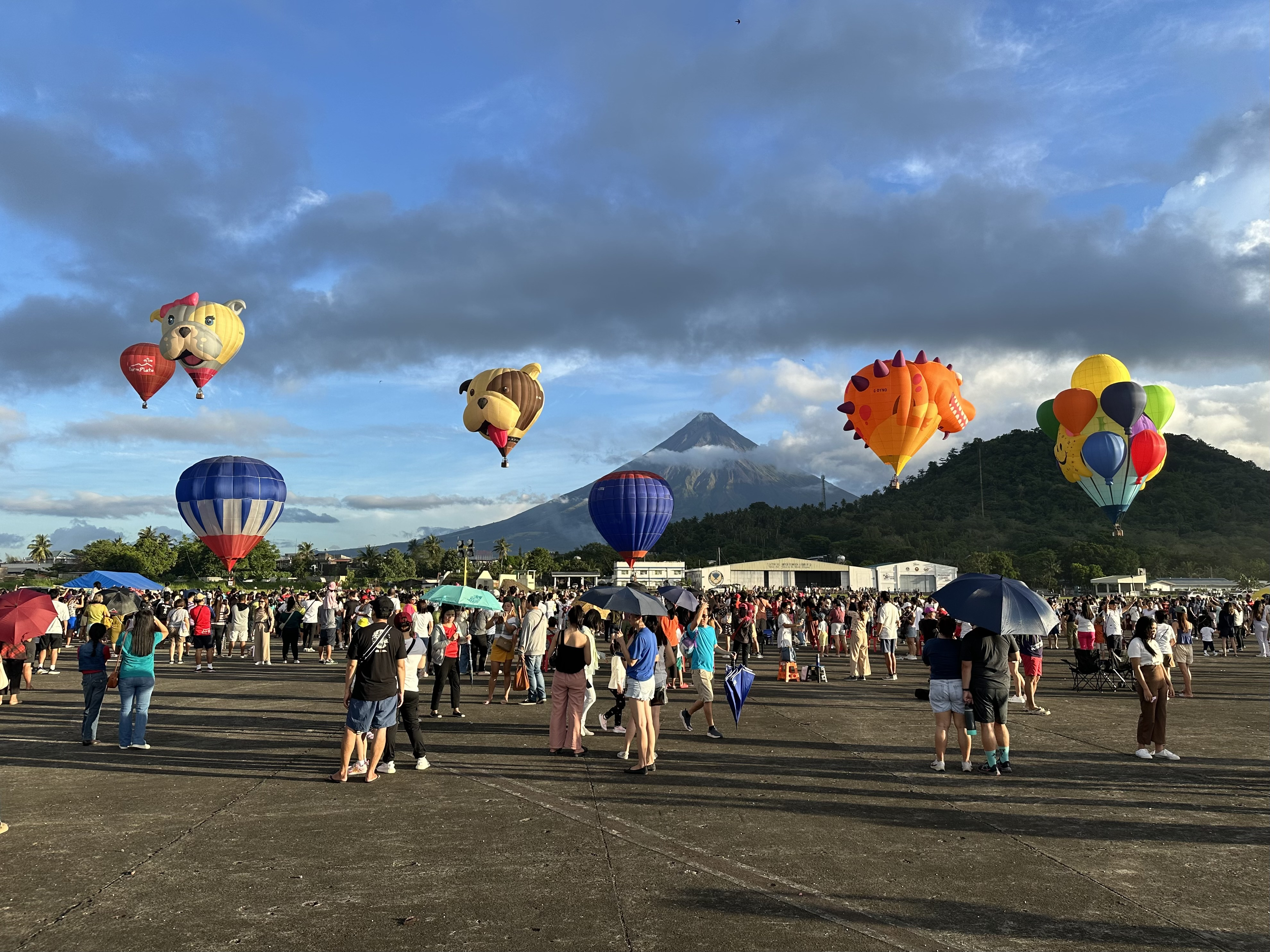
Hot air balloons during the 2024 Bicol Loco Festival

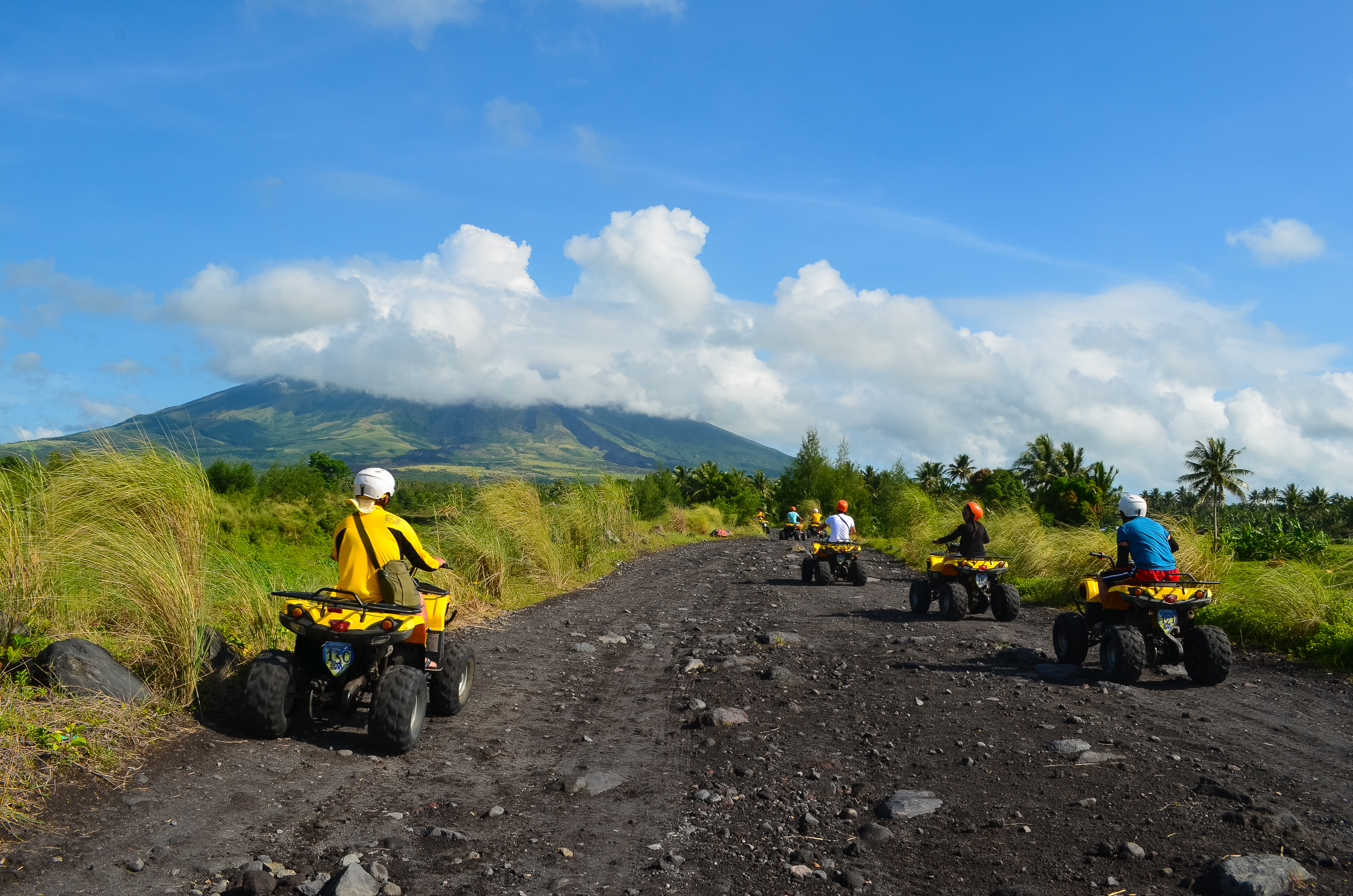
ATV ride to Mayon

==== Revenue ====
Tourism is a major contributor to the economy of Legazpi due to the city's location at the foot of Mayon Volcano and its promotion as the "City of Fun and Adventure". According to the Philippine Information Agency Albay province was the most visited destination in the Bicol Region in 2024 with 1,391,170 domestic and 16,023 foreign tourist arrivals, the highest in the Bicol Region. Regional tourism receipts reached ₱3.5 billion from domestic travelers, with Albay accounting for the largest share. The opening of the Bicol International Airport in nearby Daraga in 2021 improved the city's accessibility to national and international visitors, and as of 2023 Legazpi had 37 Department of Tourism accredited hotels and 13 accredited resorts.

==== Attractions ====
Legazpi offers a range of outdoor activities including all-terrain vehicle (ATV) rides on volcanic trails, ziplining, skydiving, scuba diving, and water sports along the Albay Gulf. The city also serves as a gateway to eco-cultural attractions nearby, such as the Cagsawa Ruins, Ligñon Hill Nature Park, Peñaranda Park, and heritage landmarks including Daraga Church and St. Gregory the Great Cathedral. Its proximity to surrounding destinations including Sumlang Lake in Camalig, the caves of Jovellar, the beaches of Bacacay, and the whale shark interaction sites in Donsol makes it a hub for regional tourism.

Albay Astrodome

In addition to promoting adventure tourism, the city is also a destination for MICE tourism ("Meetings, Incentives, Conventions, and Exhibitions"). Facilities such as the Legazpi City Convention Center and the adjacent Exposition Building can accommodate a combined total of nearly 9,000 delegates, and these are complemented by other large venues including the Ibalong Centrum for Recreation and the Albay Astrodome, enabling the city to host regional and national events.

Festivals form an integral part of Legazpi's tourism calendar, including the annual August Ibalong Festival, the Magayon Festival celebrated every May, and the Bicol Loco Festival, a three-day hot-air balloon and extreme sports event held at the former airport grounds. The city also hosts several other prominent sports events centered on Mount Mayon and adventure racing, including the annual Mt. Mayon Triathlon, the Mayon 360° Ultramarathon—a solo 80 km or 50-mile endurance run circumnavigating Mayon—and various XTERRA off-road triathlon competitions . Legazpi has also been a frequent port of call for international cruise ships, and since October 2018 a number of vessels have docked at Legazpi's port. Recognizing this opportunity, the city and national government initiated a ₱920 million project for a dedicated cruise ship terminal featuring a rock causeway, passenger building, and updated port facilities.

=== Banking and finance ===
==== Banks and financial services ====
Legazpi serves as the financial center of Albay and one of the primary banking hubs in the Bicol Region. As of 2024 it hosts over 50 bank branches, including major commercial banks such as BPI, BDO, Metrobank, Land Bank, and DBP, as well as thrift and rural banks such as BPI Legazpi Savings Bank and Camalig Bank. Bangko Sentral ng Pilipinas (BSP) maintains a satellite office in the city while the regional headquarters of Land Bank of the Philippines and Development Bank of the Philippines (DBP) are located in the city. According to BSP data the total volume of bank deposits in Legazpi reached ₱77.6 billion by the end of December 2024.

Beyond commercial banking, Legazpi supports a broad spectrum of financial services including microfinance providers (e.g., SEDP), 57 lending firms, 16 financing companies, 31 pawnshops, and 63 insurance offices as of 2024. This diversified financial ecosystem enhances access to credit, insurance, and remittance services for individuals and small businesses across the region. Regulatory and supervisory presence – including the BSP and SEC offices – further solidifies Legazpi's status as a regional financial hub, supporting economic growth and inclusion.

==== Information technology ====
Legazpi is among the 25 priority "Digital Cities 2025" as designated by the Department of Information and Communications Technology (DICT) and the IT & Business Process Association of the Philippines (IBPAP). The program identifies urban centers with strong potential for accelerated growth in the information technology and business process management (IT-BPM) sector. This reflects how Legazpi has grown as an IT‑BPM hub in the Bicol region, with the city government reporting that ₱30 billion in investments has flowed into Legazpi over the past decade. For example, the Embarcadero IT Park – a PEZA‑accredited ecozone on the waterfront – offers 8,000 call‑center seats and Legazpi now hosts ten IT‑BPM companies, employing 5,000 full‑time staff.

== Government ==
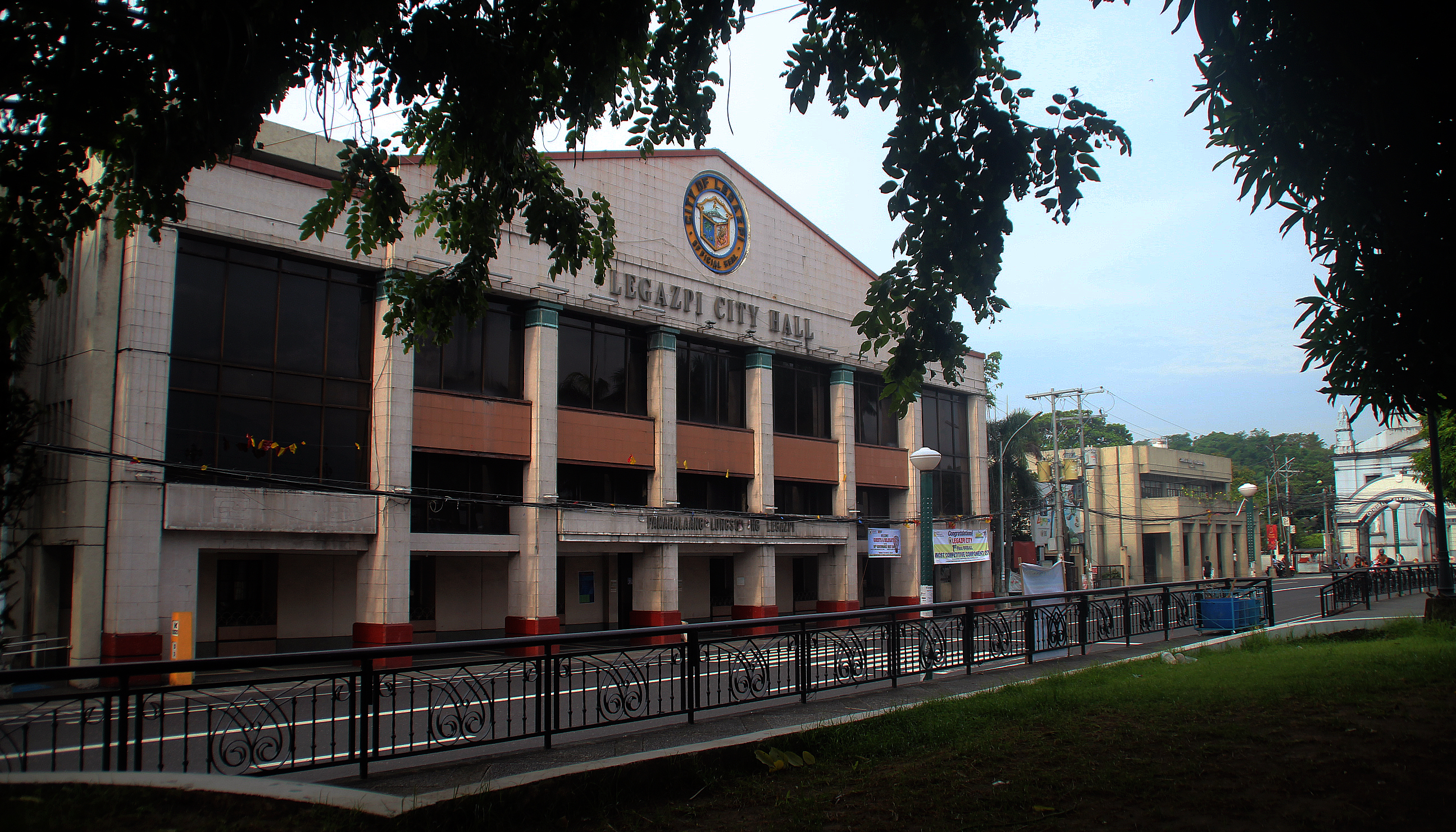
Legazpi City Hall

=== Barangays ===
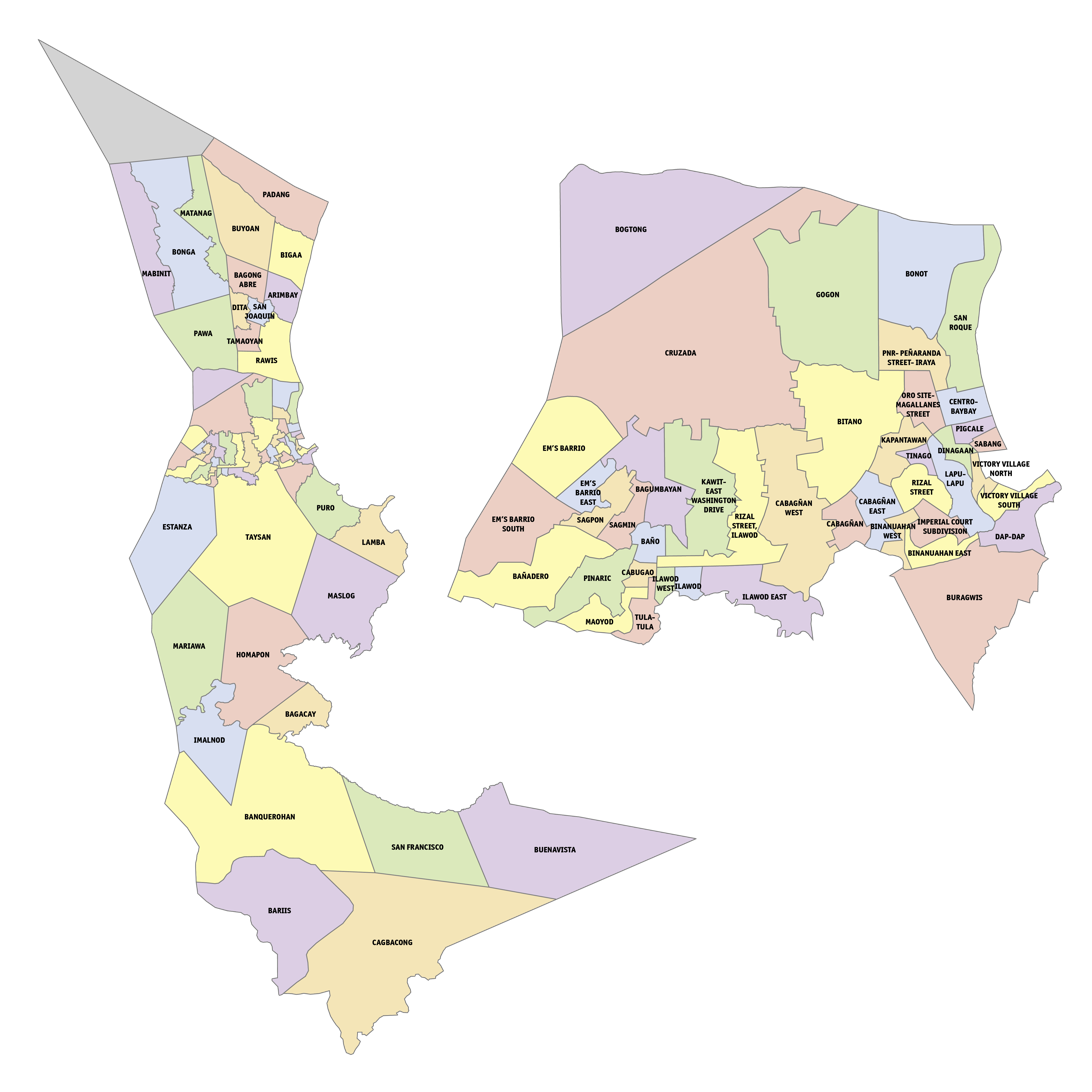
Political map of Legazpi, Albay

Legazpi is subdivided politically into 70 barangayss, with each barangay consisting of subdivisions called purokss and with some having further subdivisions of sitios. There are currently 45 urban barangays and 25 rural barangays in Legazpi.

Barangay number	Barangay name	Class	Population (2015)	Barangay head
1	Em's Barrio	Urban	3,725	Irma Trinanes
2	Em's Barrio (South)	Urban	1,820	Mila Bal
3	Em's Barrio (East)	Urban	900	Jose P. Pispis
4	Sagpon	Urban	953	Gibsen Salvador E. De Leoz
5	Sagmin	Urban	1,375	Jude A. Rico
6	Bañadero	Urban	1,390	Arthur R. Marco
7	Baño	Urban	645	Domingo Alberto D. Pasano Jr.
8	Bagumbayan	Urban	3,400	Amore Rex B. Rañeses
9	Pinaric	Urban	1,493	Roy A. Nanoz
10	Cabugao	Urban	547	Victor R. Lapasaran
11	Maoyod	Urban	1,110	Romeo A. Madraso
12	Tula-Tula	Urban	2,586	Arnold Bahillo
13	Ilawod West Pob. (Ilawod 1)	Urban	721	Maria Lourdes F. Baltazar
14	Ilawod Pob. (Ilawod 2)	Urban	854	Gerald A. Ayque
15	Ilawod East Pob. (Ilawod 3)	Urban	2,879	Erlim A. Azotea
16	Kawit-East Washington Drive	Urban	5,372	Jonathan G. Rodenas
17	Rizal St. – Ilawod	Urban	2,048	Lina A. Chan
18	Cabañgan (West)	Urban	3,856	Rowena Olimpo
19	Cabañgan	Urban	1,427	John B. Macalampad
20	Cabañgan (East)	Urban	641	Ma. Nimfa B. Bolanos
21	Binanuahan (West)	Urban	917	Jose T. Abiera
22	Binanuahan (East)	Urban	1,619	Carmen V. Sarona
23	Imperial Court	Urban	746	Gina M. Samaupan
24	Rizal	Urban	2,695	Ricardo V. Abunda
25	Lapu-Lapu	Urban	1,398	Karren Canon - Valdez
26	Dinagaan	Urban	798	Ma. Jocelyn L. Astor
27	Victory Village (South)	Urban	1,418	Joie M. Bahoy
28	Victory Village (North)	Urban	2,399	Antonio L. Loveriza
29	Sabang	Urban	1,656	Ismael G. Santillan
30	Pigcale	Urban	1,688	Fernando Lopez
31	Centro Baybay	Urban	1,879	Teresita L. Empig
32	San Roque	Urban	5,632	Joselito G. Martinez
33	PNR – Peñaranda St. – Iraya	Urban	2,773	Marife D. Velasco
34	Oro Site – Magallanes St.	Urban	1,633	Oriel Madella
35	Tinago	Urban	375	Syri R. Sayco
36	Capantawan	Urban	644	Eric Sim B. Brizuela
37	Bitano	Urban	8,559	Bernard Y. Pacardo
38	Gogon	Urban	5,752	Maria Theresa Sambajon-Naz
39	Bonot	Urban	3,521	Reynaldo Bendicio
40	Cruzada	Urban	5,853	Edsil N. Llaguno
41	Bogtong	Urban	4,753	Armando M. Toledo
42	Rawis	Urban	8,868	Joel A. Orosco
43	Tamaoyan	Rural	1,642	Sylvia M. Del Agua
44	Pawa	Rural	3,469	Ma. Yulina A. Que
45	Dita	Rural	1,791	Romeo A. Almayda Jr.
46	San Joaquin	Rural	2,260	Richard S. Ibarra
47	Arimbay	Urban	3,753	Janita B. Bea
48	Bagong Abre	Rural	1,627	Ester B. Cargullo
49	Bigaa	Rural	6,730	Ricardo A. Arienda
50	Padang	Rural	1,653	Harold L. Bembenuto
51	Buyuan	Rural	3,895	Ernesto B. Perez
52	Matanag	Rural	1,895	Reynaldo D. Poguilla
53	Bonga	Rural	3,503	Michael A. Mina
54	Mabinit	Rural	1,640	Levy Lourdes P. Nunez
55	Estanza	Rural	4,237	Josephine A. Baloso
56	Taysan	Rural	12,330	Benjamin Rosin
57	Dap-dap	Urban	2,287	Glenn J. Barcelon
58	Buraguis	Urban	4,549	Amelita T. Bariso
59	Puro	Rural	4,756	Nicasio G. Barrios Jr.
60	Lamba	Rural	1,352	Norberto M. Abion
61	Maslog	Rural	4,796	Felicidad A. Olimpo
62	Homapon	Rural	4,832	Benhur B. Ariola Jr.
63	Mariawa	Rural	1,664	Cristina L. Arana
64	Bagacay	Rural	1,616	Julian A. Ariola
65	Imalnod	Rural	2,146	Valentino M. Llaneta
66	Banquerohan	Rural	6,976	Crispin A. Botin
67	Bariis	Rural	1,812	Geremias B. Leron Jr.
68	San Francisco	Rural	2,479	Rosemarie A. Barrameda
69	Buenavista	Rural	1,319	Ester P. Ardales
70	Cagbacong	Rural	2,776	Genaro M. Asilo

=== City officials ===
Legazpi is governed by a mayor, a vice mayor, and ten councilors, with each city official elected to serve for a three-year term. The representatives of the Liga ng mga Barangay and the Sangguniang Kabataan also participate in the city council. The current city mayor of Legazpi is Hisham B. Ismail.

Inclusive years	Mayor
1898-1900	Agripino Imperial (Appointed by Gen. Emilio F. Aguinaldo)
1901–1903	Balbino Belarmino (President Mun. of Legazpi)
1901–1903	Florencio Magdaraog (President Mun. of Albay Viejo)
1904–1905	Severo M. Isidro (President Mun. of Legazpi)
1904–1908	Ramon Serrano (President Mun. of Albay Viejo)
1906–1907	Silvestre S. Siping (President Mun. of Legazpi )
1908–1909	Agripino Segovia (President Mun. of Albay Viejo)
1910–1921	Ramon Serrano (President Mun. of Albay Viejo)
1921–1925	Ramon Serrano (President Mun. of Legazpi )
1921–1925	Crispin de la Torre (President Mun. of Albay Viejo)
1925–1928	Ramon Serrano (President Mun. of Legazpi )
1928–1931	Catalino Elizondo (President Mun. of Legazpi)
1931–1934	Juan R. Serrano
1935–1937	Feliciano F. Imperial
1938–1941	Dr. Prudencio Papa
1941–1944	Vicente Nieves
August 26, 1941 – September 24, 1941	Alfredo Rebueno
1944–1945	Pedro Abaleta (Japanese Appointed)
1945-June 13, 1946	Antonio A. Azaña
June 14, 1946 – March 25, 1947	Feliciano F. Imperial
March 26, 1947 – 1947	Francisco de Leoz
1947–1948	Herculano E. Pareja
1948–1952	Jose A. Arboleda
1952–1953	Marcial O. Rañola
1953	Abelardo M. Imperial
1953	Domingo S. Bailon
1954–1959	Ramon A. Arnaldo
1960–1957	Luis S. Los Baños
January 1, 1968 – April 7, 1986	Gregorio S. Imperial
April 8, 1986 – December 1, 1987	Cezar A. Burdeos
December 2, 1987 – March 7, 1988	Juan D. Victoria
March 8, 1988 – December 1, 1991	Benjamin S. Imperial
December 2, 1991 – June 30, 2001	Imelda C. Roces
June 30, 2001 – June 30, 2010	Noel E. Rosal
June 30, 2010 – June 30, 2013	Carmen Geraldine B. Rosal
June 30, 2013 – June 30, 2022	Noel E. Rosal
June 30, 2022 – September 16, 2024	Carmen Geraldine B. Rosal
September 16, 2024 – November 11, 2024	Oscar Robert H. Cristobal (Acting Mayor)
November 11, 2024 – June 30, 2025	Alfredo A. Garbin Jr.
June 30, 2025 – Present	Hisham B. Ismail

== Culture ==
=== Festivals ===
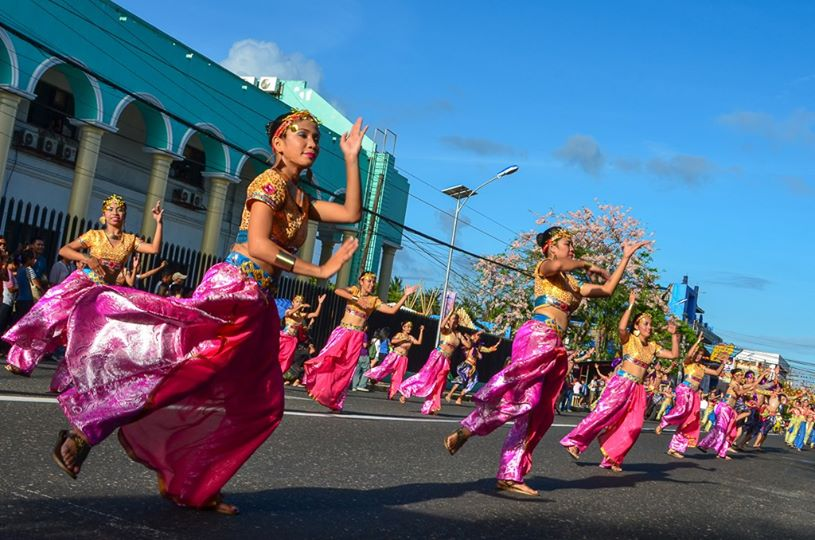
Magayon Festival

Legazpi hosts several annual festivals including the Ibalong Festival, the Magayon festival, and the Bicol Loco Hot Air Balloon Festival. The Ibalong Festival is a non-religious cultural celebration held every August to commemorate the ancient epic-fragment of Ibalong and its legendary heroes of Baltog, Handyong, and Bantong. The nine-day festival features street dance presentations, trade fairs and markets, the Mutya ng Ibalong beauty pageant, and various sporting competitions such as the Mt. Mayon Triathlon. Each May, the province observes the Magayon Festival, a month-long cultural event held to celebrate the legend of Daragang Magayon (from the Bikol word magayon, meaning "beautiful") and the iconic Mt. Mayon, with many of the events held in Legazpi's Penaranda Park. The festival's activities typically include agricultural fairs and exhibits, cultural performances, parades, and the Daragang Magayon beauty pageant portraying the legendary maiden Magayon. The Bicol Loco Hot Air Balloon Festival is a more recently established festival, first staged in 2024 at Legazpi's old airport. It is an annual mid-year event held over a number of days and featuring dozens of colorful hot-air balloons and aerial activities such as skydiving jumps, paramotor and aerobatic displays, and nightly concerts and entertainment.

During the Christmas season, the city holds Paskuhan sa Legazpi (Christmas Village) in Sawangan Park. Launched in 2019, the Paskuhan is a holiday festival of lights and displays designed to attract tourists and features large illuminated Christmas installations, a holiday night market, and nightly entertainment with live bands. Legazpi's two city districts also observe annual patronal fiestas. In the Port District, the feast of St. Raphael the Archangel is celebrated every October 24 and the city government has declared October 24 a special non-working holiday each year for this district fiesta. The old Albay District holds its feast day on September 3 in honor of St. Gregory the Great. There are also several local festivals held in the city's barangays including Santo Cristo Festival in Barangay Dap-Dap, Bankero Festival in Barangay San Roque, Biga Festival in Barangay Bigaa, Banua Festival in Barangay Binanuahan, Peñafrancia Festival in Barangay Sabang, and Hikot Festival in Barangay Victory Village.

=== Cuisine ===
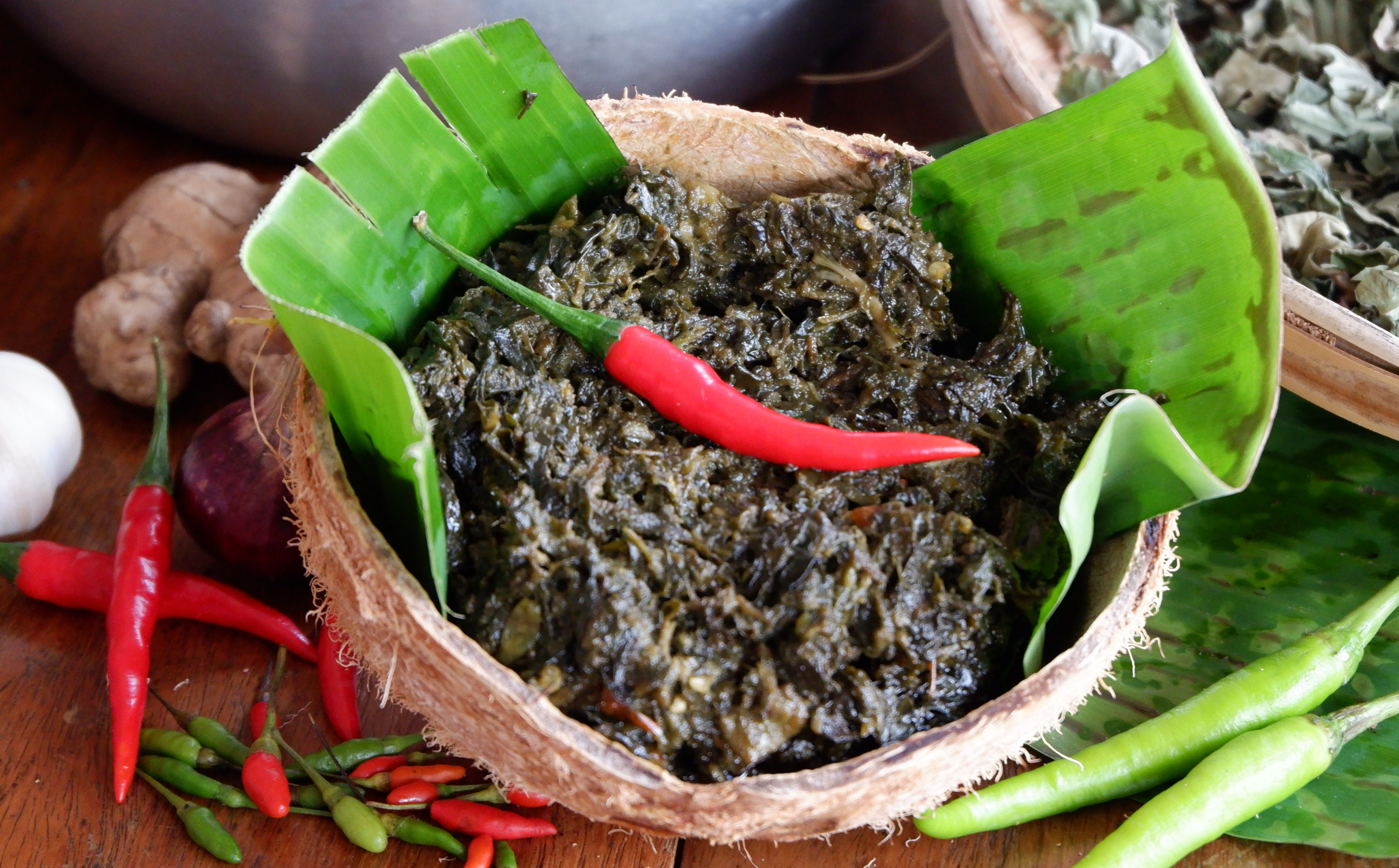
Laing

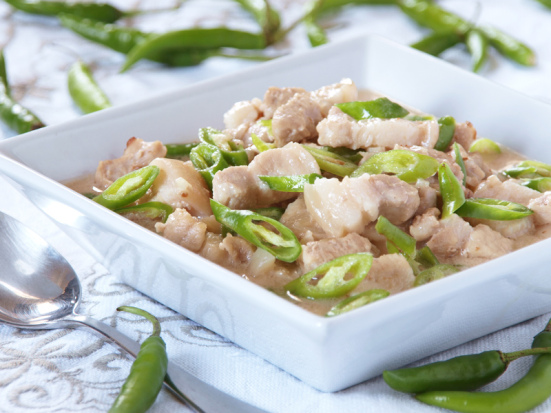
Bicol Express

Legazpi's cuisine reflects the bold, coconut-rich, and chili-infused flavors of Bicolano cooking. Common staples include laing (dried taro leaves in coconut milk), Bicol Express (pork stewed in spicy coconut cream), and pinangat (ground shrimp wrapped in taro leaves). These dishes rely on gata (coconut milk) and siling labuyo (bird's eye chili), giving Bicolano food its distinct richness and heat. Another local specialty is tinutungang manok, a spicy chicken stew made with "scalded" or charred coconut cream.

Street food and local eateries in Legazpi also serve dishes such as kinunot (shredded stingray or shark in coconut milk with malunggay), inolokan (a variety of pinangat, crab or shrimp stuffed in taro leaves and stewed in creamy coconut sauce), and kandingga, a spicy Bicolano version of bopis using pork offal. For dessert the city is known for sili ice cream, made with red chilies and available in varying levels of spiciness, with other native sweets include pilinut candies and pili pastillas.

=== Museums ===
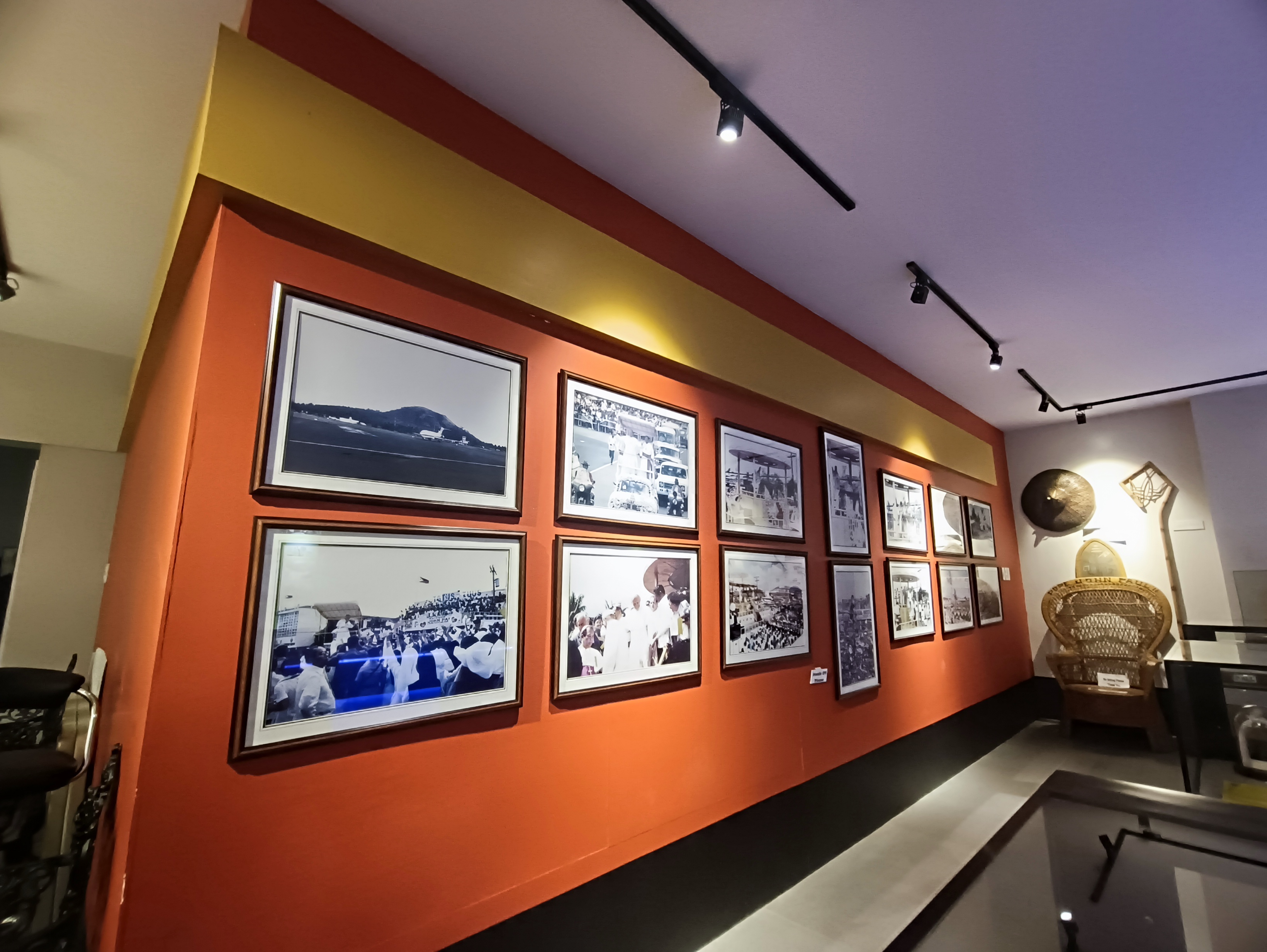
Museo de Legazpi

The Legazpi City Museum and Library is located in a wing of City Hall on Rizal Street and serves as the city's main repository of its tangible heritage, containing displays of archaeological sherds, ethnographic items, 19th-century photographs, and dioramas. Though modest in size it is noted for its object-based storytelling of everyday life in the Mayon region. Nearby, beside St. Gregory the Great Cathedral, is the Museo de Legazpi which was opened in March 2019 and is operated by the City Tourism Office. It follows a three-gallery format with a chronological history exhibit, a heritage-object room, and a rotating gallery that has hosted themes such as Catriona Gray national costumes and Pope John Paul II memorabilia.

The Albay Capitol Atrium Art Gallery regularly features exhibits by Bicolano artists and serves as a key venue during the Magayon Festival. Just outside the city in Busay, Daraga, the National Museum of the Philippines–Bicol has permanent exhibitions that cover the geology of Mayon Volcano, regional biodiversity, archaeological finds from sites such as Cagsawa, and also includes a rock garden.

=== Parks ===
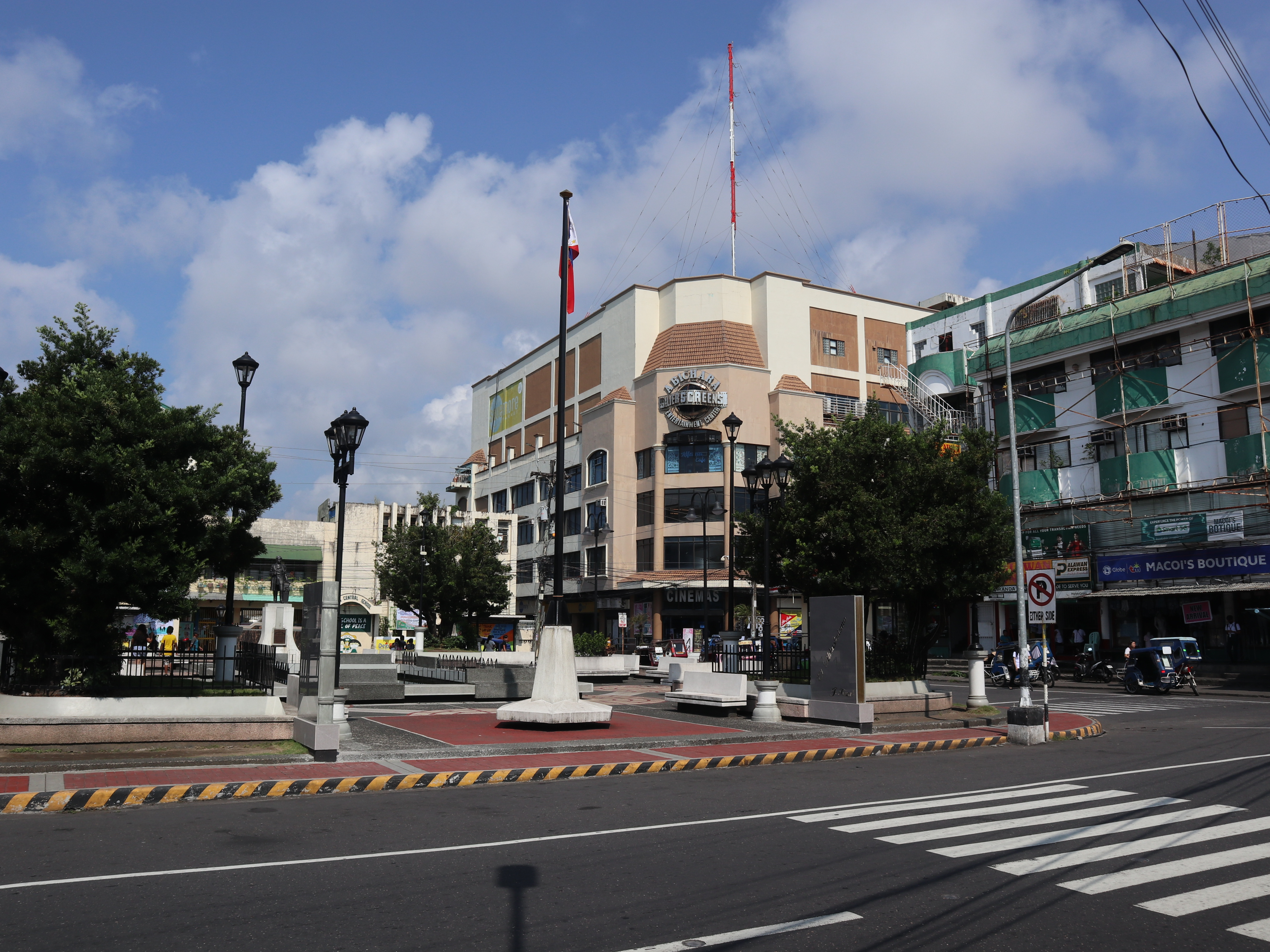
Plaza Rizal

Legazpi has several public parks that serve as recreational spaces, cultural sites, and components of the city's urban landscape. Peñaranda Park, also known as Freedom Park, is situated in the Old Albay District and is named after Spanish colonial official José María Peñaranda. Newly renovated in 2025 the park retains the traditional layout of a town plaza and has hosted public assemblies and civic events. Its proximity to government institutions and heritage buildings makes it a focal point for administrative and ceremonial functions. Plaza Rizal in the Port District near St. Raphael the Archangel Church is another central open space named in honor of national hero José Rizal. It includes a monument and landscaped areas and has hosted educational, religious, and civic gatherings.

Kalayaan Park in Barangay Gogon – formerly known as Imelda Park – was redeveloped in 2022 as part of a city-led revitalization project and now includes a central fountain, children's play areas, and landscaped walkways. The park serves as a recreational space for nearby residential neighborhoods and is occasionally used for barangay-level events and gatherings. Ibalong Park – initially named People's Park – is located along Legazpi Boulevard in Barangay Puro and was inaugurated in May 2025. Designed as a linear coastal park it contributes to the city's waterfront development and provides additional open space along the boulevard.

Bicol Heritage Park is within Camp General Simeon Ola, the Philippine National Police regional headquarters, and includes a monument to General Simeon Ola, a revolutionary figure from Albay during the Philippine-American War. The park functions primarily as a commemorative site and is accessible to the public. The Albay Park and Wildlife is located near the Daraga-Legazpi boundary and is a zoological and botanical facility administered by the provincial government. It contains a variety of native and non-native animal species and features picnic areas and landscaped grounds. The park is primarily used for educational trips, family outings, and provincial environmental programs. Ligñon Hill Nature Park is located on a cinder cone rising 156 meters above sea level and includes a paved trail to the summit from which visitors can view Legazpi, Mayon Volcano, and surrounding areas. In addition to its recreational use the hill hosts a volcano monitoring station operated by the Philippine Institute of Volcanology and Seismology (PHIVOLCS).

=== Monuments ===
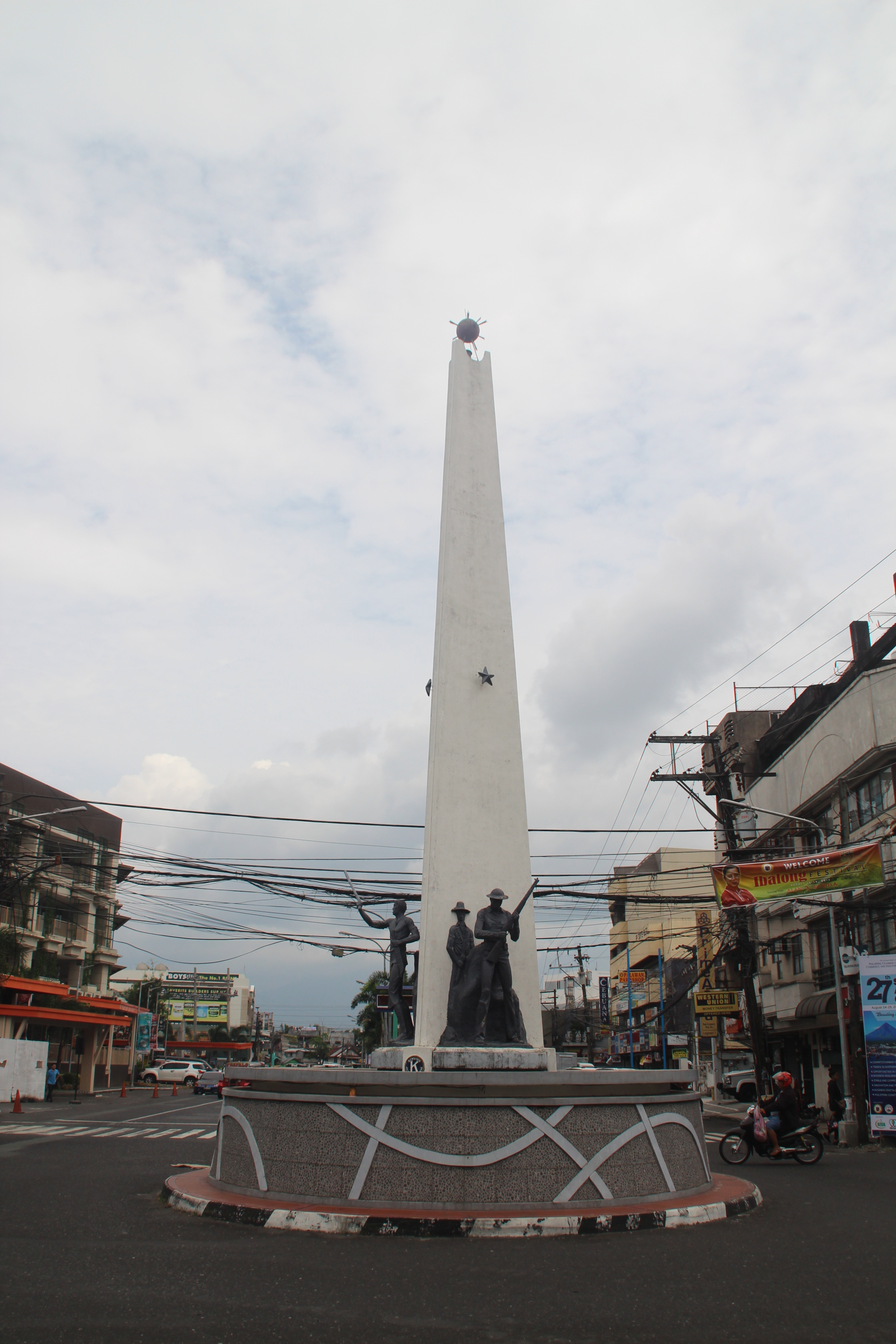
Battle of Legazpi Pylon

Legazpi is home to a number of monuments that reflect its layered history and cultural identity. At the intersection of Rizal Street and Quezon Avenue stands the Battle of Legazpi Monument, a postwar concrete pylon commemorating the January 23, 1900 clash between Filipino defenders under Commander Antonio Reyes and US forces during the Philippine-American War. The Liberty Bell installed by American troops in Peñaranda Park in 1945 symbolizes liberation from Japanese occupation, with its inscription inviting people to ring it "whenever oppression knocks" embodying themes of freedom and postwar renewal.

At Plaza Rizal a bronze statue of José Rizal was originally erected in 1924 and rebuilt after World War II, serving as a civic centerpiece and enduring tribute to the national hero. In Barangay Tamaoyan the 15-meter Our Lady of Salvation statue sculpted by local artist Toi Napay depicts the Virgin Mary and child. Along Legazpi Boulevard, statues of the legendary heroes of the Ibalong Epic Baltog, Handyong, and Bantong stand sentinel at the entrances to bridges named after them. Created between 2021 and 2023 by sculptor Juanito Napay these figures are central to Legazpi's promotion of its indigenous folklore. A more somber reminder of the past is the Headless WWII Memorial in front of the post office which commemorates unidentified Filipino guerrillas killed during the war and was inspired by the discovery of a decapitated body on Sabang beach in 1945.

The Padang Memorial Shrine in Barangay Padang marks the devastation wrought by Typhoon Reming in 2006 when lahar flows buried much of the village. The site contains a tribute to the victims and is visited yearly for remembrance. In Barangay Bañadero a statue of General José Ignacio Paua, the only full-blooded Chinese general in the Philippine revolution, honors his contributions to the anti-colonial struggle in the Bicol region. Near Sawangan Park the statue of Miguel López de Legazpi depicts the Spanish conquistador holding a scroll representing the city's colonial foundation and namesake. On the coast of Barangay Rawis the Albay Gulf Landing Pylon, built in 1995, commemorates the arrival of Allied forces in 1945 that led to the city's liberation from Japanese rule.

=== Sports ===
Legazpi is represented in the Philippines National Rugby League Championship by the Albay Vulcans, a Philippine rugby union and rugby league team based in Legazpi.

== Transportation ==
Legazpi is considered as the gateway to Bicol because of its geographical location being in relative proximity to the provinces of the region. With an airport, seaport, bus and rail terminals, the city is accessible to all modes of transportation.

=== Air ===
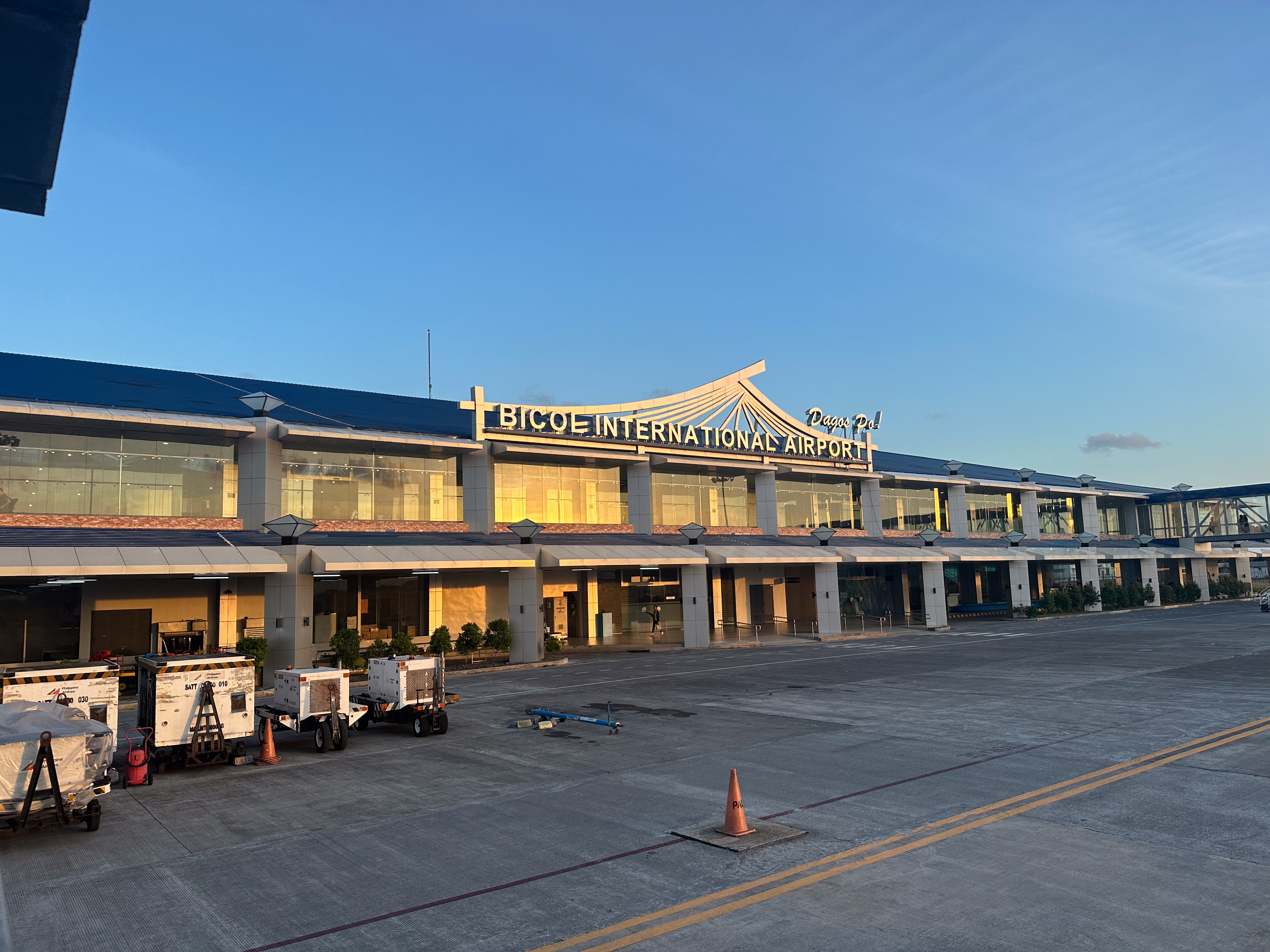
Bicol International Airport Terminal

Legazpi is served by the Bicol International Airport (BIA) in Barangay Alobo, Daraga, which opened in October 2021 to replace the old Legazpi Airport. With modern facilities and a single runway 2,500 meters (8,200 ft) long and 45 meters (148 ft) wide, BIA is designed to handle wide-body jets. By 2024 it was handling over 2 million passengers annually, making it a major regional hub. It currently offers multiple daily flights connecting Daraga to Manila, Cebu, and Iloilo through carriers like Cebu Pacific (including its Cebgo subsidiary) and Philippine Airlines.

=== Sea ===
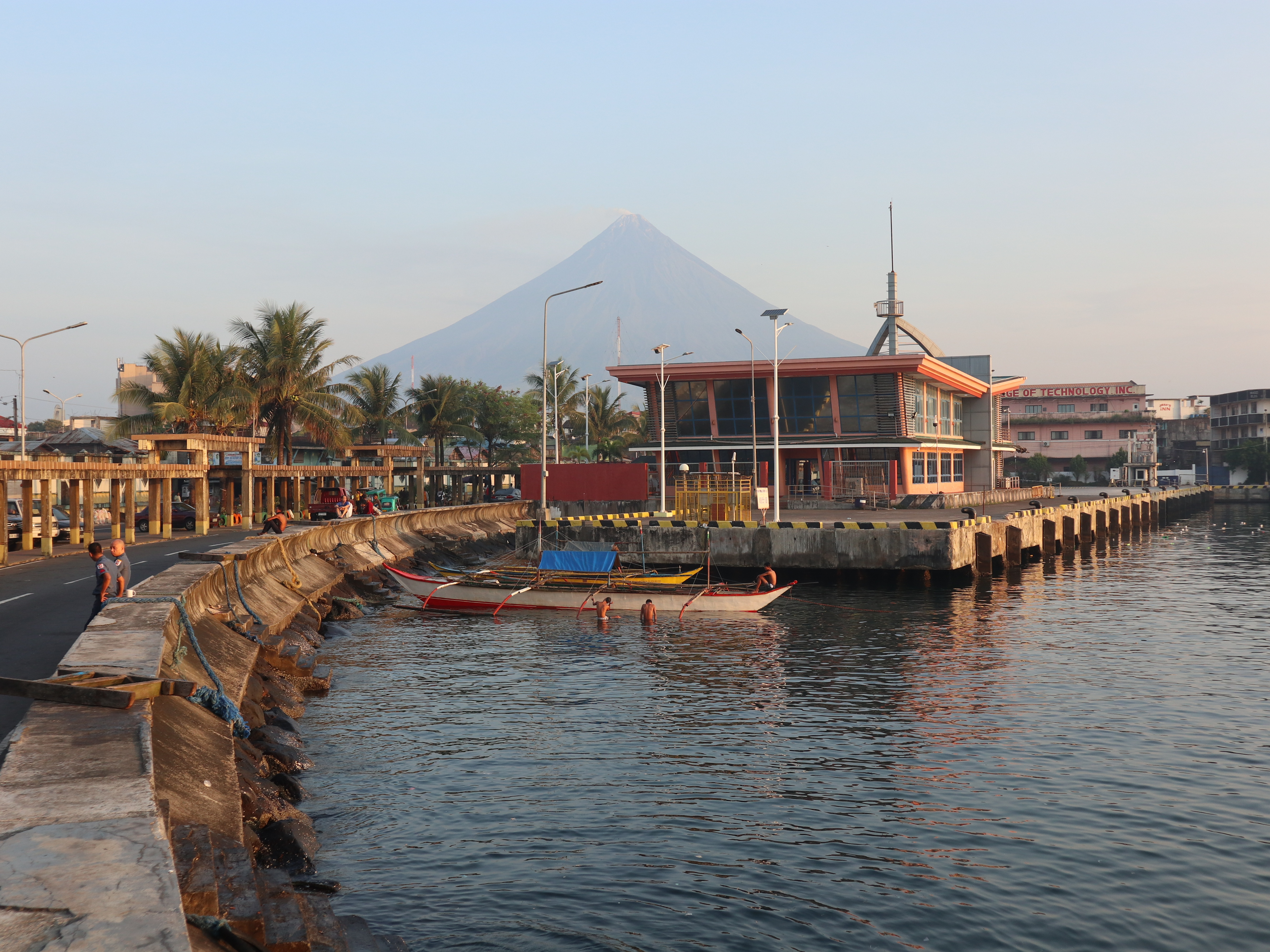
Legazpi Port Terminal

Legazpi Port is classified as a national sub-port of entry, handling domestic and some foreign shipping, and acts as the key export port for Bicol's agricultural and mineral products. Regular ferry services connect Legazpi to nearby islands such as Rapu-Rapu Island (Albay) and to coastal communities in Sorsogon's Bacon District.

=== Rail ===
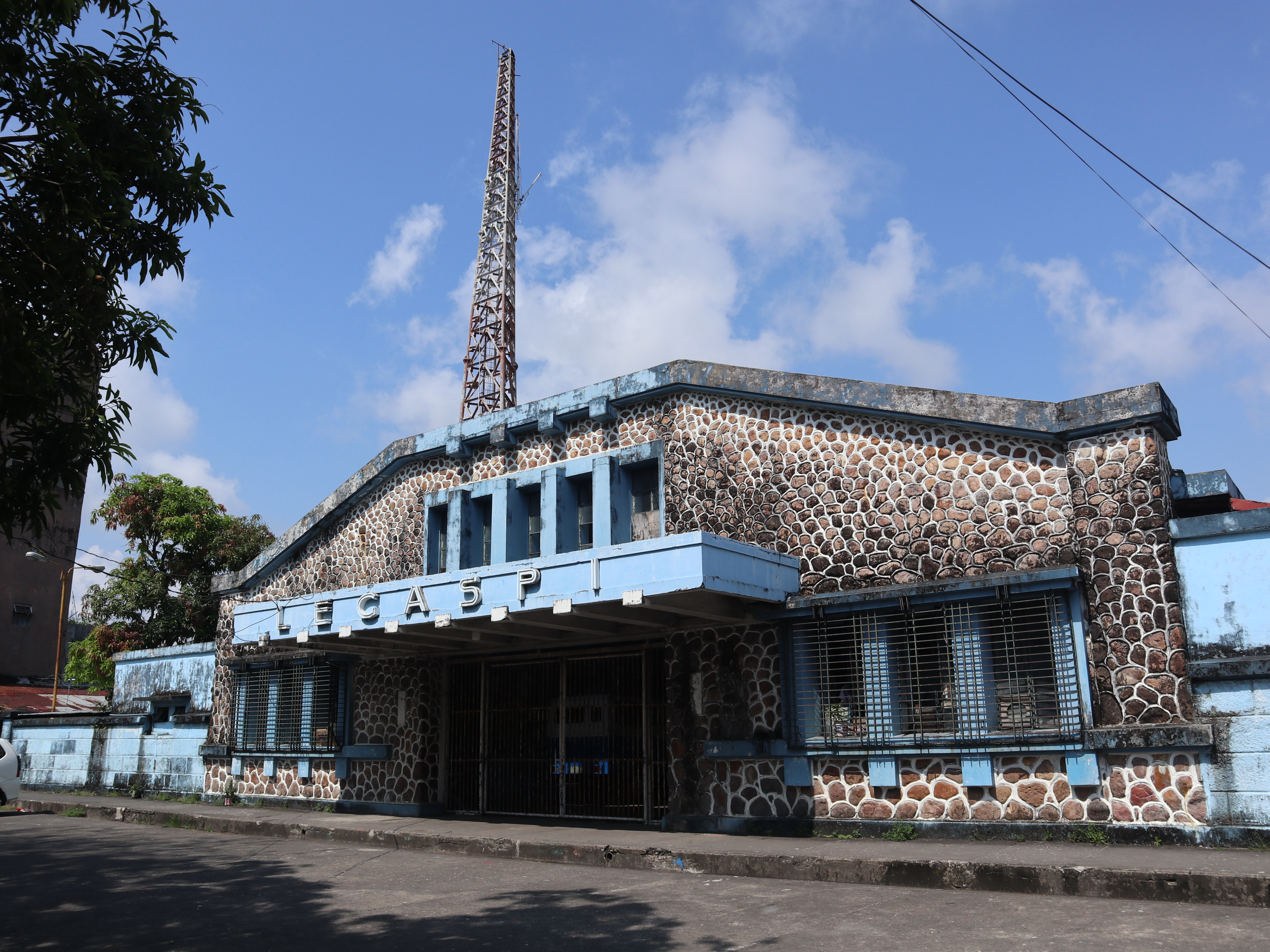
PNR Legazpi Station

Legazpi was formerly the southern terminus of the Philippine National Railways (PNR) South Main Line. After years of service interruptions including a six-year suspension due to a shortage of rolling stock, commuter rail operations in the Bicol Region were partially restored with the resumption of the Naga–Legazpi route on December 27, 2023. Services were again briefly disrupted in late 2024 due to typhoon-related damage but were fully reinstated on February 26, 2025, with the current daily route including stops at Pili, Baao, Iriga, Ligao, and Daraga.

The Department of Transportation (DOTr) has announced plans for long-term rail modernization in the region, including efforts to secure funding for the revival of the long-distance Bicol Express and the proposed South Long Haul railway project, a standard-gauge connection between Manila and Legazpi.

=== Road ===
Legazpi Grand Central Terminal

Legazpi lies on the Maharlika Highway, part of the Pan-Philippine Corridor which connects the city by road to Manila to the north and Sorsogon to the south. The national government plans to improve connectivity with SLEX Toll Road 5, a 420‑km, four‑lane expressway from Lucena City (Quezon Province) through the Bicol Region to Matnog (Sorsogon). This highway will significantly cut travel time along the eastern seaboard of Luzon and will pass through Quezon, Camarines Sur, Albay and Sorsogon.

Public road transport in Legazpi includes buses, jeepneys, tricycles, taxis, and pedicabs, with Legazpi Grand Central Terminal the main intercity bus and van terminal for the city. This award-winning terminal was built under a 25‑year public-private partnership whereby a private developer constructed and now operates the 3.45-hectare "state-of-the-art" terminal complex at no cost to the city. It handles routes to Naga, Manila, and other major cities, and has modern facilities for passengers. Local trips within the metro area are mainly by jeepney and tricycle, with taxi cabs and ride hailing services serving the central business district.

As of 2023 Legazpi had a total road length of 590.09 kilometers. Of this, the majority (520.90 kilometers) were concrete roads, with the remaining network including 54.16 kilometers of asphalt roads, 10.24 kilometers of gravel roads, and 4.79 kilometers of unpaved roads.

== Health and waste management ==
Legazpi serves as a major healthcare hub in the Bicol Region, offering a mix of public and private medical services. As of 2023, the city had a total of 9 hospitals (3 public and 6 private) with a combined 1,555 hospital beds (608 public and 947 private). In addition, the city hosted 487 clinics (70 public and 417 private) and 507 clinic beds (74 public and 433 private), reflecting the growing role of outpatient services in urban healthcare delivery. The city also supports diagnostic and laboratory services through 497 laboratories and diagnostic clinics (79 public and 418 private), with 533 diagnostic beds (95 public and 438 private).

Notable medical facilities in and around Legazpi include the Bicol Regional Hospital and Medical Center (BRHMC), a DOH-retained tertiary hospital and the region's main public referral center. The city is also home to Albay Doctors' Hospital, Estevez Memorial Hospital, and Legazpi City Hospital. Neighboring Daraga hosts the additional key institutions of the Bicol University College of Medicine's training hospital and Daraga Doctors Hospital.

The city government operates a 1.5-hectare (3.7-acre) sanitary landfill in barangay Banquerohan. Opened in 2011 through a grant from the Spanish government's Agencia Española Cooperacion Internacional para el Desarollo (AECID), the landfill has two cells that contain the city's non-recyclable waste. In 2010 Legazpi implemented a solid waste management program with emphasis on reduction of waste at the household and business establishment level; resource recovery, recycling, and reusing at the barangay level; and collection, transfer, transport and management of residual waste at the city level. The city also aims to reduce plastic waste by implementing the 'plastic for rice program' wherein citizens can exchange five kilos of residual plastic waste for a kilo of rice. As a result of its waste management programs the city was able to successfully reduce solid waste generated per capita per day from 0.5 kilograms (1.1 lb) in 2009 to 0.29 kilograms (0.64 lb) in 2015.

== Education ==
Legazpi is the educational center of the province of Albay, hosting a broad network of institutions that provide early childhood, basic, technical, tertiary, and graduate education. The city is home to both public and private universities, colleges, and specialized institutions in fields such as medicine, maritime education, and teacher training.

As of School Year (SY) 2022–2023, Legazpi recorded 4,398 graduates and 34,444 enrollees in higher educational institutions (HEIs) recognized by the Commission on Higher Education (CHED). In addition there were 2,650 senior high school graduates under the Department of Education (DepEd) and 18,705 graduates from technical-vocational programs under TESDA. The city's top disciplines in HEIs included Education Science & Teacher Training (13,617), Accountancy and Business Administration (8,113), Engineering & Mathematics (4,319), IT-related fields (2,852), and Medical and Allied Fields (1,736). As of 2024 Legazpi had 104 daycare/preschools (25 private and 79 public); 67 elementary schools (23 private and 44 public); 10 universities and colleges (9 private and 1 public); 30 technical/vocational institutions (16 private and 14 public); and 4 special education centers (2 private and 2 public).

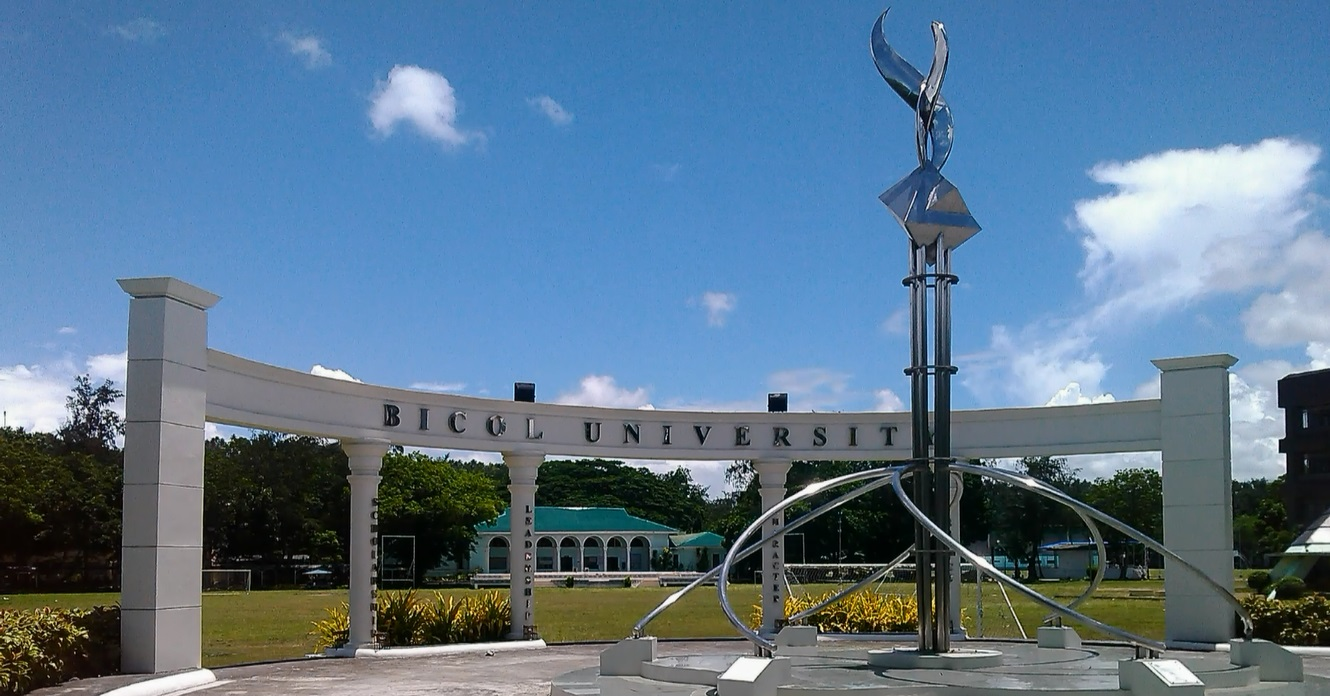
Bicol University Main Campus

Bicol University (BU) was established in 1969 and is a leading public university. It enrolled 26,346 students in 2023 and holds ISO 9001:2008 certification. The university offers programs across education, engineering, agriculture, fisheries, medicine, nursing, business, law, and the arts. BU graduates consistently rank in national licensure exams. In March 2025 its Daraga campus achieved a 97.12% pass rate in the Licensure Examination for Teachers and in September 2024 a BU graduate topped the Social Workers Licensure Examination, with all 116 BU examinees passing. The university also produced top students in the 2025 Registered Electrical Engineer and Registered Master Electrician exams.

UST-Legazpi

University of Santo Tomas–Legazpi (UST–Legazpi) is a private Catholic university administered by the Dominican Order and was established in 1948, attaining university status in 1968. It offers basic education, undergraduate, and graduate programs across five colleges: Arts, Sciences and Education; Health Sciences; Engineering, Architecture and Fine Arts; Business Management and Accountancy; and Law. Its College of Law produced the top student in the 2019 Bar Examination. The Graduate School offers programs in education, nursing, psychology, business, and public administration. Its MBA program holds Level III accreditation from the Philippine Association of Colleges and Universities Commission on Accreditation (PACUCOA).

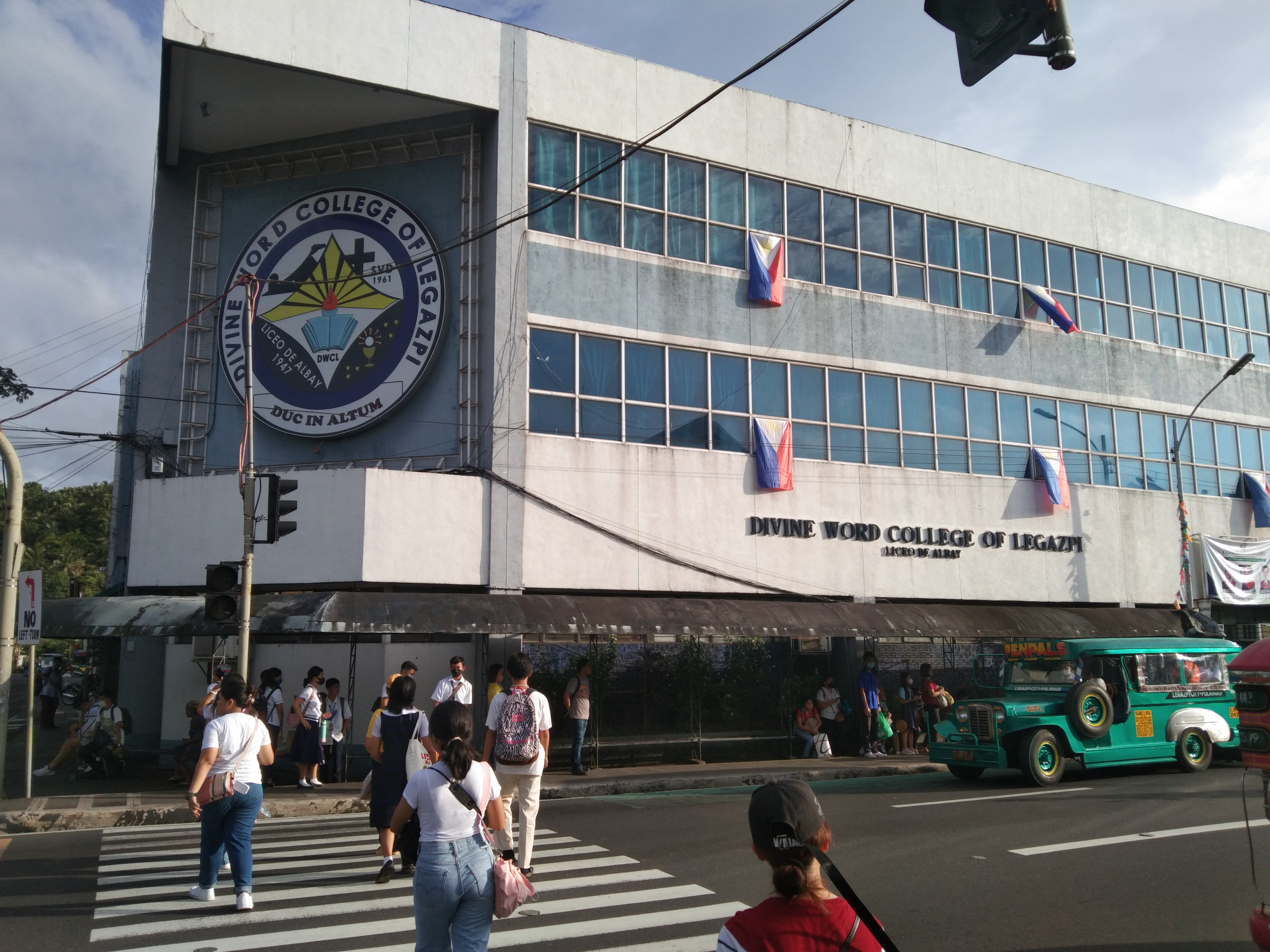
Divine Word College of Legazpi

Divine Word College of Legazpi (DWCL) is a private Catholic institution operated by the Society of the Divine Word (SDW) and was founded in 1947. It offers both basic and higher education, with academic programs including teacher education, business, engineering, and nursing. Several of its programs are accredited by the Philippine Accrediting Association of Schools, Colleges and Universities (PAASCU). DWCL integrates religious instruction and values-based education into its academic offerings.

Ago Medical and Educational Center/Bicol Christian College of Medicine (AMEC–BCCM) is a private medical school established in 1975. It offers a Doctor of Medicine program and other allied health courses, is affiliated with national medical education bodies, and is listed in the World Directory of Medical Schools. In 2022 it reported a high passing rate in the Midwifery Licensure Examination, including some top ten placements.

Mariners' Polytechnic Colleges Foundation (MPCF–Legazpi) specializes in maritime education and training, offering programs in marine transportation, marine engineering, and related technical courses. In 2025 the institution completed its ISO 9001:2015 recertification audit. MPCF maintains partnerships with international shipping companies and reports regular student placement in the maritime industry.

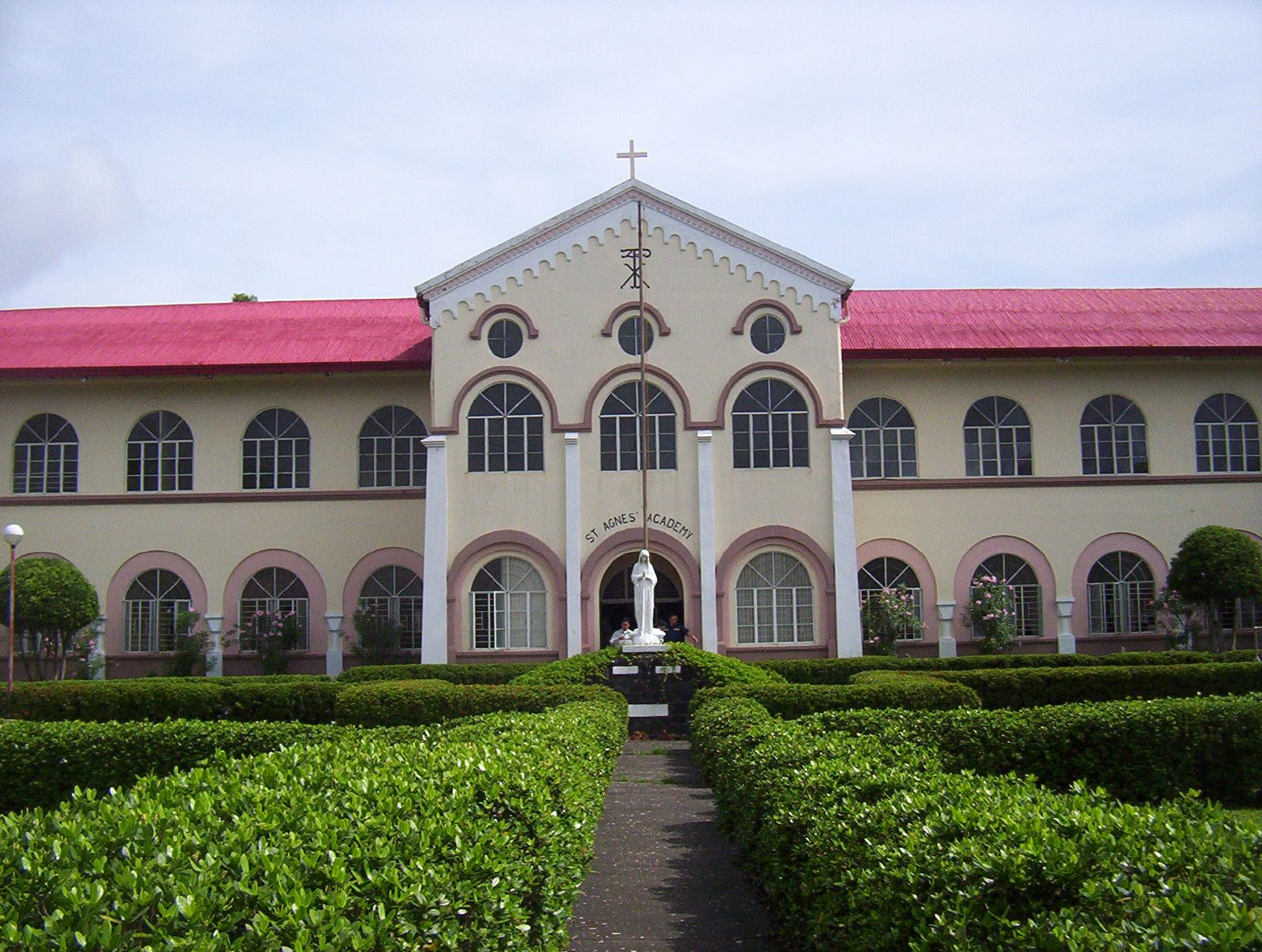
St. Agnes' Academy, Legazpi

St. Agnes' Academy (SAA) was founded in 1912 by the Missionary Benedictine Sisters and is the oldest Catholic school in Albay. It is a private, coeducational K–12 institution.

Legazpi City Science High School (LEGASCI) is a public science high school established in 2004 and designated as a science high school in 2016. It offers a Special Program in Science, Technology, and Engineering (SPSTE) at the junior high level, and STEM, ABM, and ICT strands in senior high school. LEGASCI is government-funded and its students – known locally as "Citinistas" – regularly participate in regional competitions, supported by the city government.

== Notable personalities from Legazpi City ==
- Carlos R. Imperial – placed 3rd in the 1956 Philippine Bar Examinations, served as Albay 2nd Congressional District Representative (1965-1972, 1987-1998,2001-2007), one of the co-authors/founding fathers of Republic Act No. 5521 – An Act Establishing Bicol University, principal author of House Bill No. 144 that was enacted in law as Republic Act No. 8051 – An Act Converting the Albay Provincial Hospital in Legazpi City into a Regional Training and Teaching Hospital to be known as The Bicol Regional Training and Teaching Hospital
- Jorge S. Imperial – lawyer, served as Associate Justice and Presiding Justice of the Court of Appeals of the Philippines (1987-1999)
- Caloy Loria, businessman, politician
- Ramon Obusan, National Artist of the Philippines for Dance
- Susan Enriquez, journalist, host
- Salvacion Lim Higgins, National Artist of the Philippines for Fashion Design
- Bogs Adornado, three-time PBA Most Valuable Player (1975, 1976, and 1981); one of the PBA's 25 Greatest Players of All-Time
- Merlinda Bobis, contemporary Philippine-Australian writer and academic
- Irene Cortes, former associate justice of the Supreme Court of the Philippines; first female dean of the UP College of Law
- Janelle Quintana, actress; 19th Aliw Awards Best New Female Artist nominee
- Valerie Weigmann, TV host, actress, Miss World Philippines 2014
- Athena Imperial, news field reporter, communication researcher, Miss Philippines Earth 2011
- Miguel White, track and field athlete; bronze medalist in the 400-metre hurdles at the 1936 Summer Olympics

== Sister cities ==
=== Local ===
- Mandaluyong, Metro Manila
- Bacolod, Negros Occidental
- Bacoor, Cavite
- Masbate City, Masbate
- Sorsogon City, Sorsogon
- Castilla, Sorsogon
- Davao City

=== International ===
- Chōshi, Japan
- Hengyang, China
- (United States) Beaumont, Texas, USA

== Gallery ==
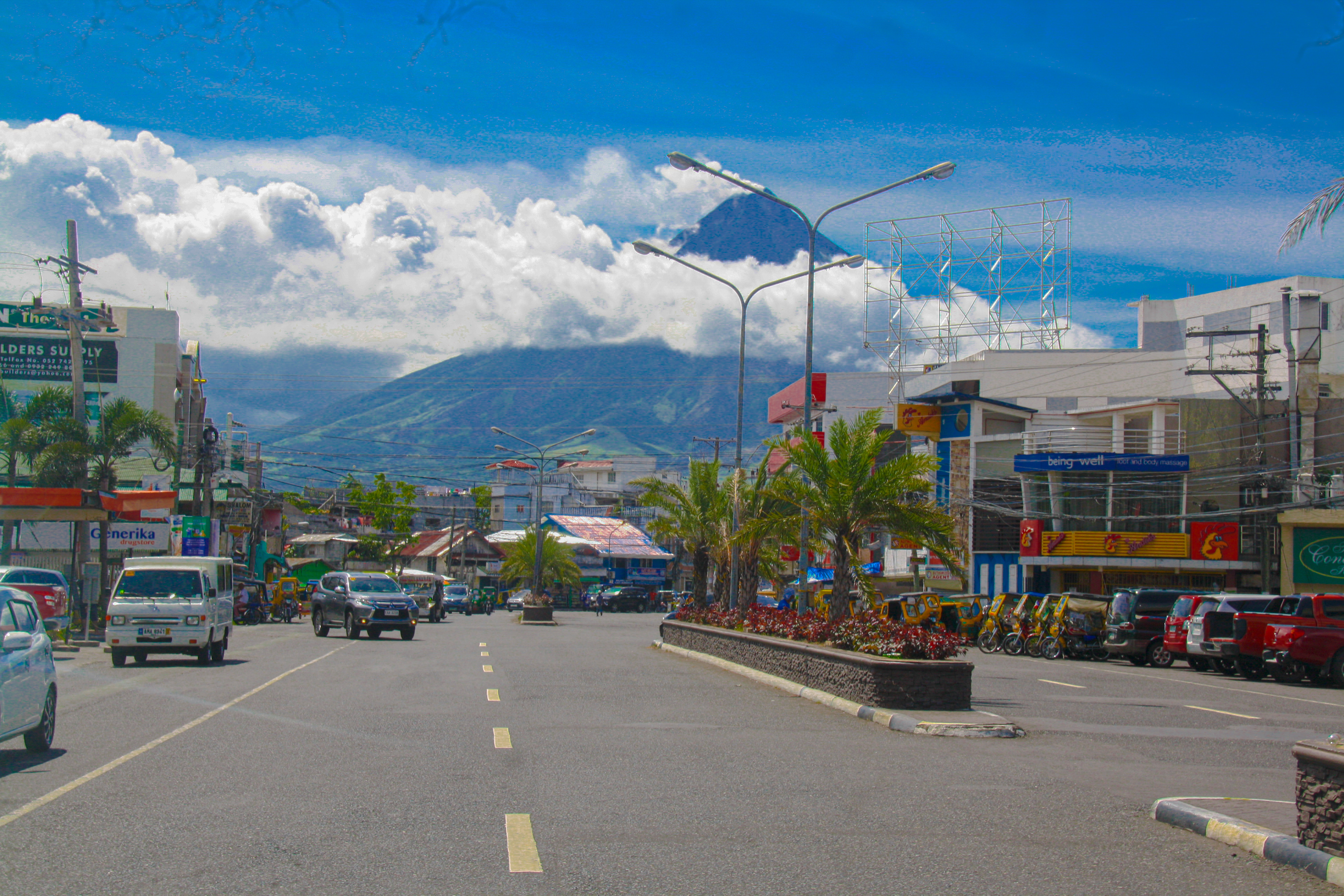
Quezon Avenue

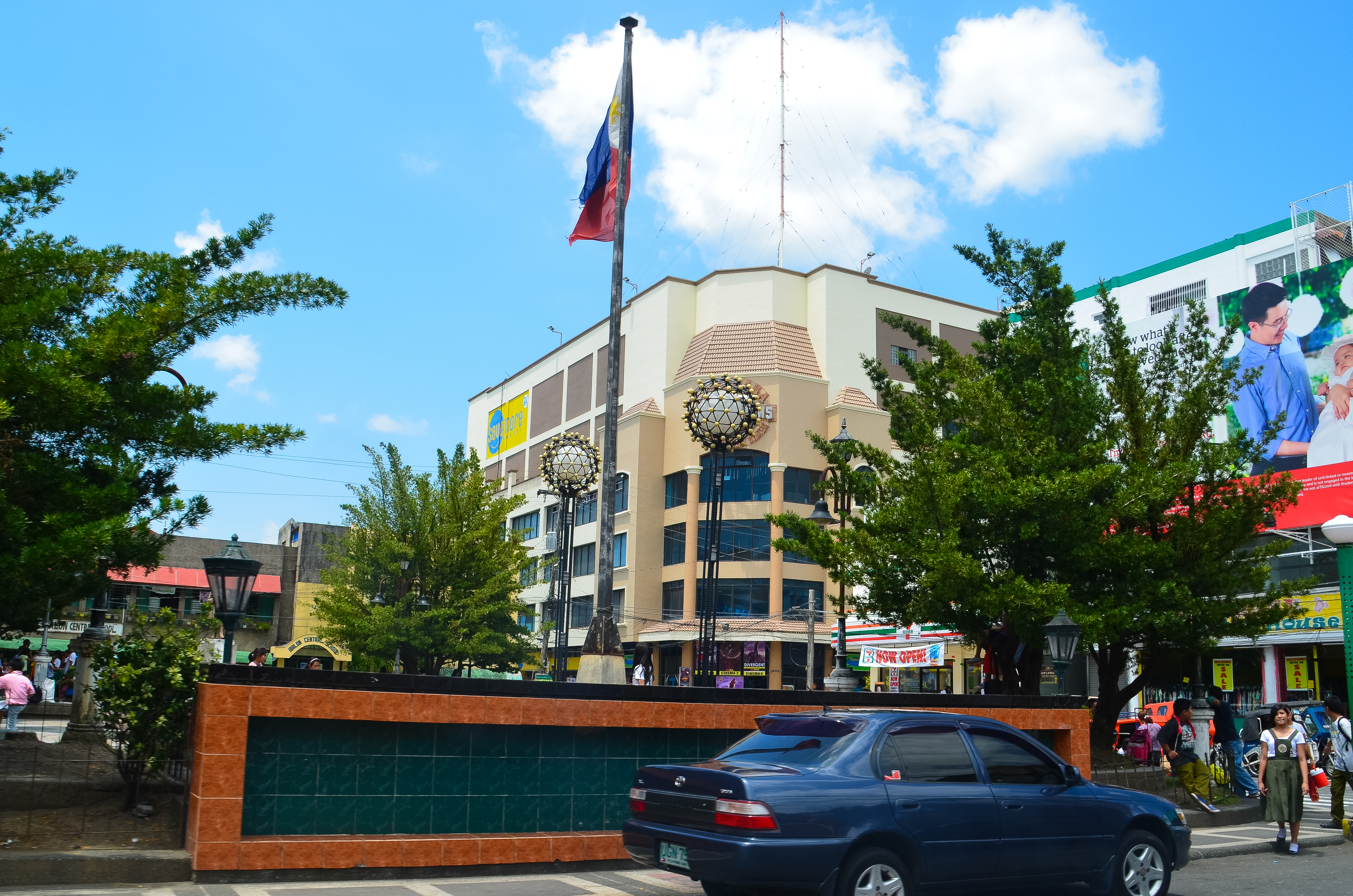
Plaza Rizal

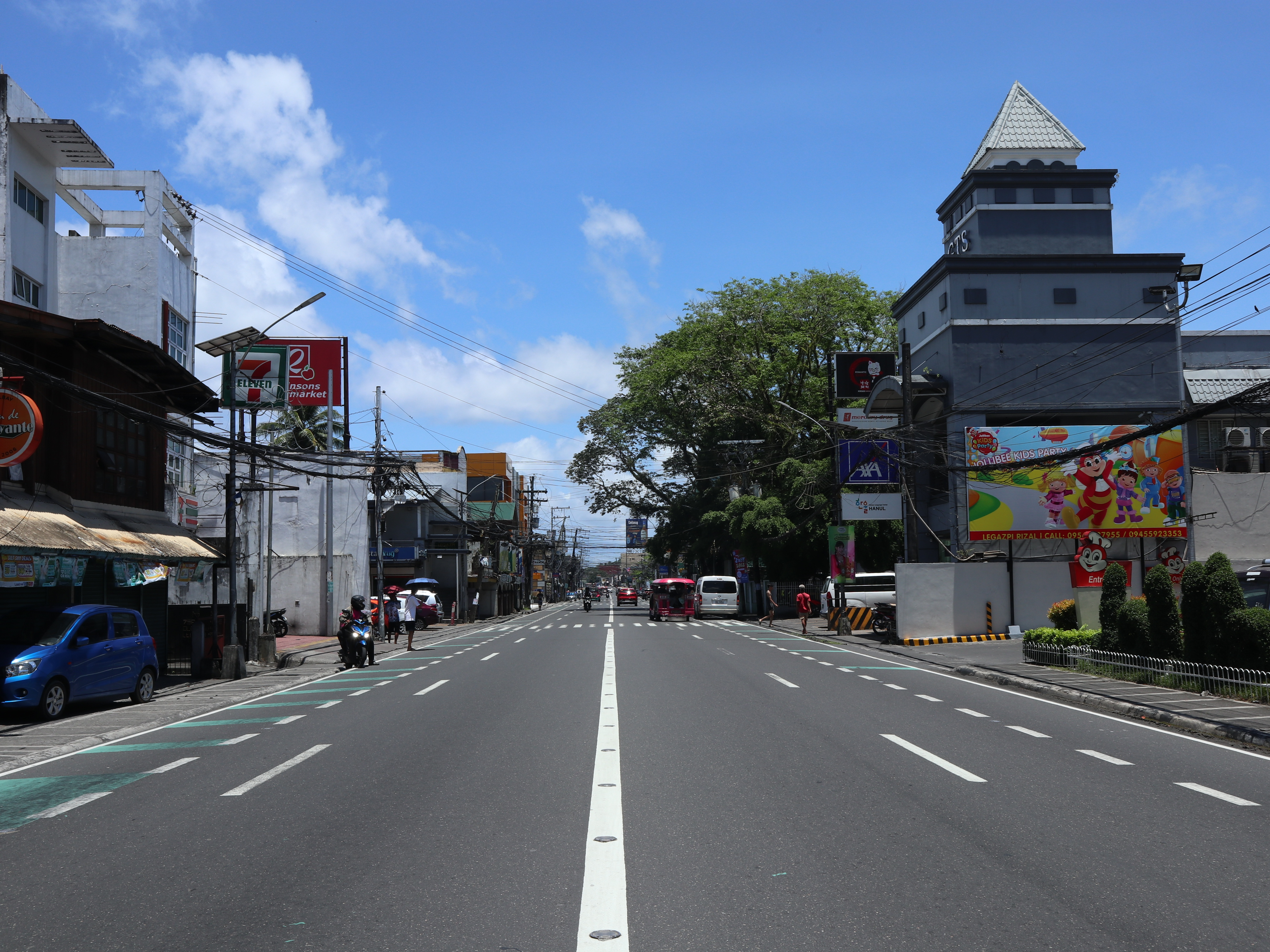
Old Albay District

Legazpi Port District

== See also ==
- Bicolano People
- List of Bicol Region Cities and Municipalities
