= Bacacay =

Municipality in Albay, Philippines

- Municipality
- Municipality of Bacacay
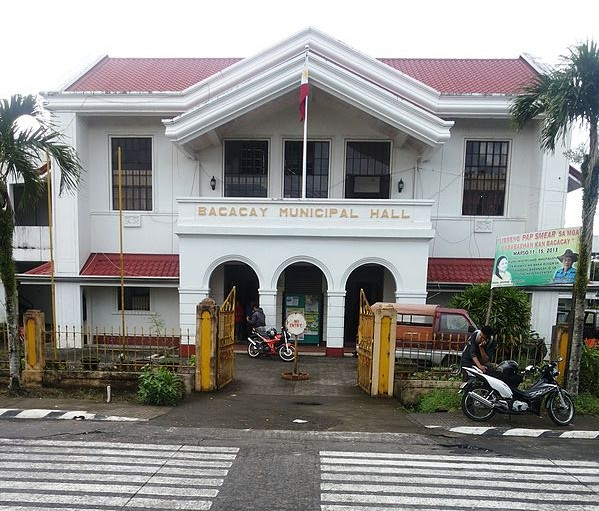
- Bacacay Municipal Hall

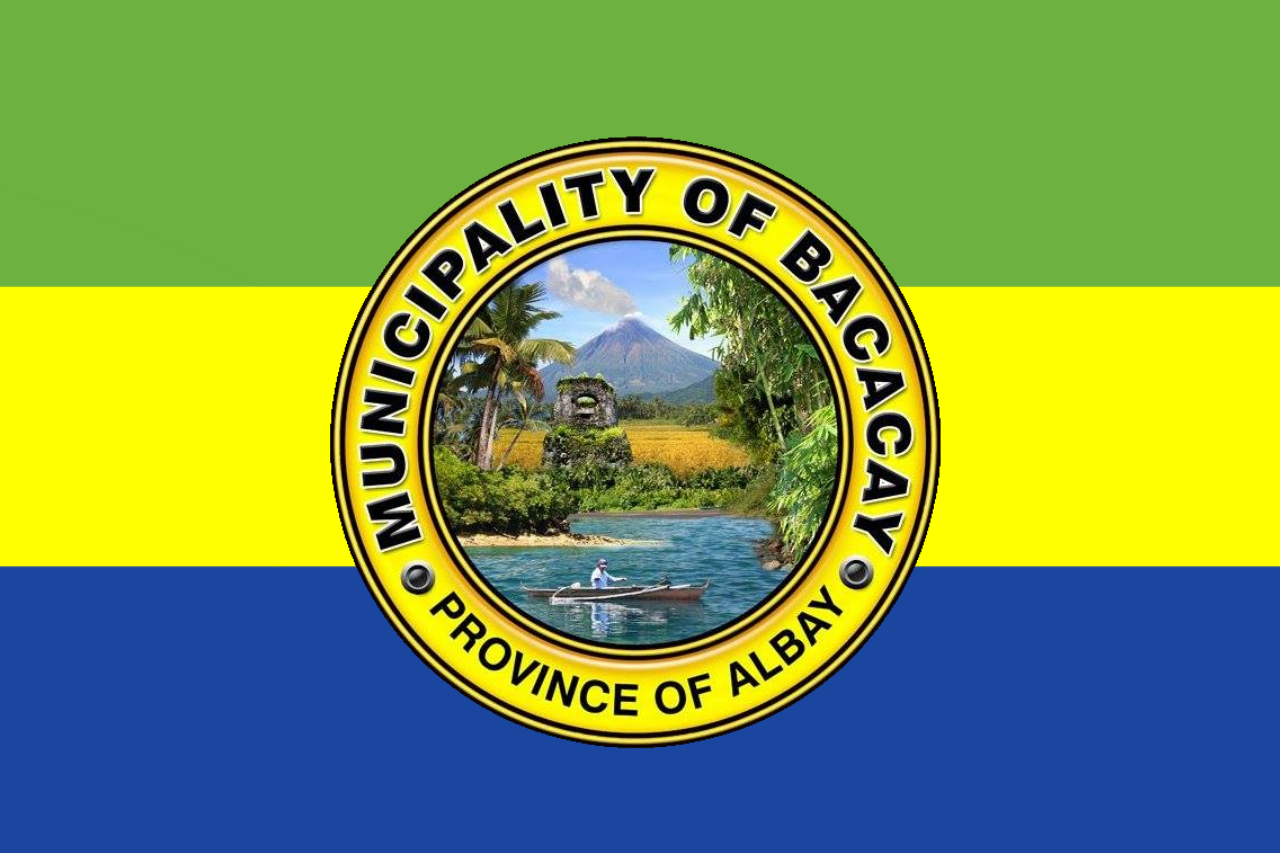
- Flag
- Nicknames: Home of Karagumoy; Beach City; Marble Town
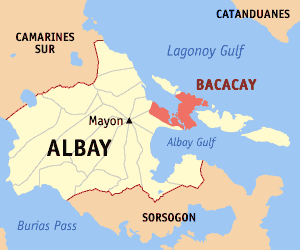
- Map of Albay with Bacacay highlighted
- Interactive map of Bacacay
- Location within the Philippines
- Coordinates: 13°17′33″N 123°47′30″E
- Country: Philippines
- Region: Bicol Region
- Province: Albay
- District: 1st district
- Barangays: 56 (see Barangays)

Government
  - Type: Sangguniang Bayan
  - Mayor: Daniel Jose "Nookie" Bombales
  - Vice Mayor: Robert Hector B. Arjona
  - Representative: Krisel Lagman
  - Municipal Council: Members: Herbert Bermas; Faith Torre; Nilda Bermundo; Rodel Belleza; Jhun Cao; Nicole Bercasio; Elen Bañares; Lara Romano
  - Electorate: 51,806 voters (2025)

Area
  - Total: 122.13 km^{2} (47.15 sq mi)
- Elevation: 47 m (154 ft)
- Highest elevation: 289 m (948 ft)
- Lowest elevation: 0 m (0 ft)

Population (2024 census)
  - Total: 72,298
  - Density: 591.98/km^{2} (1,533.2/sq mi)
  - Households: 16,386
- Demonym: Bacacayano

Economy
  - Income class: 1st municipal income class
  - Poverty incidence: 27.82% (2023)
  - Revenue: ₱ 269.2 million (2024)
  - Assets: ₱ 1,124 million (2024)
  - Expenditure: ₱ 209.8 million (2024)
  - Liabilities: ₱ 239.7 million (2024)

Service provider
  - Electricity: Albay Electric Cooperative (ALECO)
  - Water: Bacacay Water District (BAWAD)
- Time zone: UTC+8 (PST)
- ZIP code: 4509
- PSGC: 0500501000
- IDD : area code: +63 (0)52
- Native languages: Central Bikol; Tagalog
- Feast date: August 29–30
- Catholic diocese: Diocese of Legazpi
- Patron saint: St. Rose of Lima

Bacacay, officially the Municipality of Bacacay (Central Bikol: Banwaan kan Bacacay; Tagalog: Bayan ng Bacacay), is a municipality in the province of Albay, Philippines. According to the 2024 census, it has a population of 72,298 people. Bacacay is primarily an agricultural town and abundant in seafood.

It is situated along the coast of the province of Albay. The municipality is also known for its numerous islands and beaches.

== Geography ==
Bacacay is bordered by the town of Malilipot in the northwest and Santo Domingo in the southwest. Other barangays are located in Cagraray island and is shared with neighboring town Malilipot.

According to the Philippine Statistics Authority, the municipality has a land area of 122.13 square kilometres (47.15 sq mi) constituting 4.74% of the 2,575.77-square-kilometre- (994.51 sq mi) total area of Albay.

=== Barangays ===
Bacacay is politically subdivided into 56 barangays. Each barangay consists of puroks and some have sitios.

PSGC	Barangay	Population			±% p.a.	
		2024		2010		
050501001	Baclayon	3.7%	2,703	2,397	▴	0.83%
050501002	Banao	2.1%	1,491	1,379	▴	0.54%
050501032	Barangay 1 (Poblacion)	1.8%	1,308	1,078	▴	1.34%
050501038	Barangay 2 (Poblacion)	0.4%	285	282	▴	0.07%
050501039	Barangay 3 (Poblacion)	0.8%	545	543	▴	0.03%
050501040	Barangay 4 (Poblacion)	0.4%	274	277	▾	−0.07%
050501041	Barangay 5 (Poblacion)	0.4%	276	279	▾	−0.07%
050501042	Barangay 6 (Poblacion)	0.3%	248	266	▾	−0.48%
050501043	Barangay 7 (Poblacion)	0.4%	267	262	▴	0.13%
050501044	Barangay 8 (Poblacion)	0.2%	147	122	▴	1.29%
050501045	Barangay 9 (Poblacion)	0.9%	646	631	▴	0.16%
050501033	Barangay 10 (Poblacion)	1.1%	773	652	▴	1.18%
050501034	Barangay 11 (Poblacion)	0.3%	197	194	▴	0.11%
050501035	Barangay 12 (Poblacion)	0.4%	298	305	▾	−0.16%
050501036	Barangay 13 (Poblacion)	1.8%	1,315	1,249	▴	0.35%
050501037	Barangay 14 (Poblacion)	1.7%	1,237	1,176	▴	0.35%
050501003	Bariw	0.9%	625	601	▴	0.27%
050501004	Basud	2.4%	1,746	1,523	▴	0.94%
050501005	Bayandong	2.3%	1,650	1,615	▴	0.15%
050501006	Bonga (Upper)	10.6%	7,649	7,468	▴	0.16%
050501008	Buang	1.8%	1,337	1,267	▴	0.37%
050501048	Busdac (San Jose)	1.6%	1,182	1,082	▴	0.61%
050501009	Cabasan	2.8%	2,028	2,004	▴	0.08%
050501010	Cagbulacao	1.2%	862	842	▴	0.16%
050501011	Cagraray	1.0%	703	767	▾	−0.60%
050501012	Cajogutan	1.6%	1,130	1,090	▴	0.25%
050501013	Cawayan	1.7%	1,247	1,116	▴	0.77%
050501014	Damacan	0.6%	431	466	▾	−0.53%
050501015	Gubat Ilawod	1.5%	1,080	1,043	▴	0.24%
050501016	Gubat Iraya	1.6%	1,159	1,138	▴	0.13%
050501017	Hindi	5.3%	3,800	3,458	▴	0.65%
050501018	Igang	3.2%	2,332	2,128	▴	0.63%
050501019	Langaton	1.1%	765	757	▴	0.07%
050501020	Manaet	1.2%	836	764	▴	0.62%
050501021	Mapulang Daga	0.6%	453	529	▾	−1.06%
050501022	Mataas	0.7%	518	478	▴	0.55%
050501023	Misibis	1.4%	1,007	934	▴	0.52%
050501024	Nahapunan	0.6%	402	406	▾	−0.07%
050501025	Namanday	2.0%	1,482	1,440	▴	0.20%
050501026	Namantao	1.1%	778	901	▾	−1.00%
050501027	Napao	2.6%	1,883	1,690	▴	0.75%
050501028	Panarayon	2.6%	1,848	1,658	▴	0.75%
050501029	Pigcobohan	1.1%	817	838	▾	−0.17%
050501030	Pili Ilawod	2.1%	1,522	1,284	▴	1.17%
050501031	Pili Iraya	1.4%	997	924	▴	0.52%
050501046	Pongco (Lower Bonga)	1.4%	1,022	960	▴	0.43%
050501049	San Pablo	1.8%	1,274	1,240	▴	0.19%
050501050	San Pedro	2.2%	1,605	1,516	▴	0.39%
050501051	Sogod	6.3%	4,552	4,433	▴	0.18%
050501052	Sula	1.2%	873	960	▾	−0.65%
050501053	Tambilagao	1.3%	906	920	▾	−0.11%
050501054	Tambongon	1.1%	795	748	▴	0.42%
050501055	Tanagan	1.9%	1,388	1,486	▾	−0.47%
050501056	Uson	0.9%	644	625	▴	0.21%
050501057	Vinisitahan (Mainland)	0.9%	621	607	▴	0.16%
050501058	Vinisitahan (Island)	1.3%	947	926	▴	0.15%
	Total		72,298	65,724	▴	0.66%

=== Climate ===
Climate data for Bacacay, Albay
Month	Jan	Feb	Mar	Apr	May	Jun	Jul	Aug	Sep	Oct	Nov	Dec	Year
Mean daily maximum °C (°F)	27 (81)	27 (81)	28 (82)	30 (86)	31 (88)	30 (86)	29 (84)	29 (84)	29 (84)	29 (84)	28 (82)	27 (81)	29 (84)
Mean daily minimum °C (°F)	22 (72)	22 (72)	23 (73)	24 (75)	25 (77)	25 (77)	25 (77)	25 (77)	25 (77)	24 (75)	24 (75)	23 (73)	24 (75)
Average precipitation mm (inches)	138 (5.4)	83 (3.3)	74 (2.9)	50 (2.0)	108 (4.3)	165 (6.5)	202 (8.0)	165 (6.5)	190 (7.5)	186 (7.3)	188 (7.4)	183 (7.2)	1,732 (68.3)
Average rainy days	16.8	11.9	13.5	13.8	20.5	25.2	27.4	26.2	26.1	24.7	20.7	18.5	245.3
Source: Meteoblue

== Demographics ==
Population census of Bacacay
Year	Pop.	±% p.a.
1903	14,214	—
1918	20,211	+2.37%
1939	23,863	+0.79%
1948	26,504	+1.17%
1960	29,181	+0.80%
1970	37,737	+2.60%
1975	40,130	+1.24%
1980	44,433	+2.06%
1990	49,202	+1.02%
1995	56,295	+2.56%
2000	58,357	+0.77%
2007	61,574	+0.74%
2010	65,724	+2.40%
2015	68,906	+0.90%
2020	72,485	+1.07%
2024	72,298	−0.06%
Source: Philippine Statistics Authority

In the 2024 census, Bacacay had a population of 72,298 people. The population density was 590 inhabitants per square kilometre (1,500/sq mi). The old 1818 Spanish Census showed 1,295 native families paying tribute and they were coexisting with 77 Spanish-Filipino families.

== Economy ==
Poverty incidence of Bacacay (%)

Source: Philippine Statistics Authority

== Government ==
=== List of Municipal Administrators ===
Spanish Era (1792–1898)
Inclusive years	Capitan municipal
1792	Don Juan Totañez
1793	Don Salvador Del Rosario
1794	Don Lucas de los Reyes
1795	Don Juan Tiongson
1796	Don Alfonso Serrano
1797	Don Juan Dionson
1798	Don Pablo Sentelices
1799	Don Basilio de la Torre
1800	Don Simon Hilario
1801	Don Jose Basilio
1802	Don Domingo Gurobat
1803	Don Basilio de la Torre
1804	Don Felipe Sta. Ana
1805	Don Agustin Zepeda
1806	Don Reymundo de Leon
1807	Don Justo del Rosario
1808	Don Martin de Mesa
1809	Don Lucas de los Reyes
1810	Don Agustin de Zepeda
1811	Don Domingo de Leon
1812	Don Lucas de los Reyes
1813	Don Santiago de Guzman
1814	Don Justo del Rosario
1815	Don Basilio de la Torre
1816	Don Jose de la Torre
1817	Don Agustin de Zepeda
1818	Don Juan Francisco
1819	Don Gregorio Celis
1820	Don Reymundo de la Cruz
1821	Don Simon Higino
1822	Don Jose de la Torre
1823	Don Gordiano de la Torre
1824	Don Reginaldo Lorenzo
1825	Don Matias Francsico
1826	Don Mariano del Rosario
1827	Don Jose de la Torre
1828	Don Mariano P. Buenaventura
1829	Don Florentino de los Reyes
1830	Don Nicolas Romano
1831	Don Jose de la Torre
1832	Don Juan Francisco
1833	Don Agustin de Zepeda
1834	Don Pioquinto Dionson
1835	Don Francisco Quijano
1836	Don Isidoro Santelices
1837	Don Juan Francisco
1838	Don Nicolas Romano
1839	Don Florentino de los Reyes
1840	Don Basilio Francisco
1841	Don Eugenio de la Cruz
1842	Don Julian Serrano
1843	Don Narciso del Castillo
1844	Don Ignacio de Loyola
1845	Don Saturnino de la Torre
1846-1847	Don Pablo Higino
1848	Don Juan Romano
1849	Don Juan Dionson
1850	Don Claudio Enrique
1851	Don Raymundo Bañez
1852	Don Marcelino Belmonte
1853	Don Pedro Baranda
1854	Don Rafael Bes
1855	Don Francisco Baranda
1856	Don Francisco Romano
1857	Don Pedro Torre
1858	Don Inocencio Baranda
1859	Don Francisco Romano
1860	Don Alfonso Torre
1861-1862	Don Emeterio Bes
1863-1864	Don Luis Torre
1865-1866	Don Tomas Barrameda
1867-1868	Don Cipriano Villar
1869-1870	Don Anselmo Belmonte
1871-1872	Don Mariano Villarete
1873-1874	Don Luciano Bañadera
1875-1876	Don Arcadio Bellen
1877-1878	Don Tito Romano
1879-1880	Don Mariano Mora
1881-1882	Don Juan Villar
1883-1884	Don Severino Villar
1885-1886	Don Macario Barteta
1887-1888	Don Nicolas Romano
1889-1891	Don Emeterio Bes
1892-1894	Don Emigdeo Matias
1895-1898	Don Marciano Peñalosa

Republica Filipina (1898–1901)
Inclusive years	Municipal president
1898-1900	Emigdeo Matias (Appointed by Gen. Emilio F. Aguinaldo)

American Rule (1901–1941)
Inclusive years	Municipal president
1901-1903	Bartolome Torre
1904-1905	Emigdeo Matias
1906-1907	Juan Torre
1908-1909	Victorino Bes
1910-1912	Bartolome Bañares
1913-1916	Fernando Barcelon
1917-1919	Narciso B. Matias
1920-1922	Bartolome Torre
1923-1928	Mariano N. Torre
1929-1931	Juan R. Serrano
1932-1937	Juan B. Villar, Jr. (Japanese Invasion Dec. 11, 1941)

Japanese Occupation (1941–1945)
Inclusive years	Municipal Mayor
1942-1945	Juan B. Villar, Jr. (Japanese Appointed)

Post-War Period (1945–present)
Inclusive years	Municipal Mayor	Municipal Vice Mayor	SK Federation President	ABC President	Remarks
June 28, 1946 – November 25, 1946	Bonifacio Basmayor	Ceferino Bonafe (1946); Cresenciano de Guzman (August 3, 1946 – 1947)			(Acting Mayor, Appointed by Pres. Manuel A. Roxas)
November 26, 1946- December 30, 1963	Jose V. Lawenko				
January 1, 1964 – December 30, 1971	Bernardino B. Torre				
January 1, 1972 – 1982	Enrique B. Barreda				
1982-February 25, 1986	Sergio G. Alvarado, Jr.				
March 1986 – 1987	Atty. Eligio R. Berango				Appointed Mayor by Pres. Corazon Aquino
1987	Atty. Nelson Belen				Appointed Mayor by Pres. Corazon Aquino
February 1, 1988 – June 30, 1992	Alberto B. Lawenko				
June 30, 1992 – June 30, 2001	Atty. Eligio R. Berango				
June 30, 2001 – June 30, 2010	Gloria B. Berango				
June 30, 2010 – June 30, 2016	Tobias B. Betito				
June 30, 2016 – November 28, 2023	Armando B. Romano	Edcel B. Belleza			Died in Office
November 28, 2023 - June 30, 2025	Edcel B. Belleza	Robert Hector B. Arjona			
Term starts in June 30, 2025	Daniel Jose R. Bombales	Robert Hector B. Arjona			Mayor Elect

== Education ==
There are three schools district offices which govern all educational institutions within the municipality. They oversee the management and operations of all private and public, from primary to secondary schools. These are the:

- Bacacay North Schools District
- Bacacay South Schools District
- Bacacay West Schools District

Bacacay has 41 elementary schools and 7 secondary schools directly supervised by Department of Education-Division of Albay.

=== Primary and elementary schools ===
- Bacacay East Central School
- Banao Elementary School
- Bariw Integrated School - Elementary Department
- Basud Elementary School
- Bayandong Elementary School
- Bonga Elementary School
- Buang Elementary School
- Busdac Elementary School
- Cabasan Elementary School
- Cagbulacao Elementary School
- Cagraray Elementary School
- Cajugotan Elementary School
- Cawayan Elementary School
- Damacan Elementary School
- Gubat Elementary School
- Hindi Elementary School
- Igang Elementary School
- Langaton Elementary School
- Lower Bonga Elementary School
- Manaet Elementary School
- Mapulang Daga Elementary School
- Mataas Elementary School
- Misibis Elementary School
- Nahapunan Elementary School
- Namanday Elementary School
- Namantao Elementary School
- Napao Elementary School
- Panarayon Elementary School
- Pigcobuhan Elementary School
- Pili Elementary School
- Saint John Vianney Learning Center of Bacacay
- San Pablo Elementary School
- San Pedro Elementary School
- Santa Rosa de Lima Learning Center
- Sogod Elementary School
- Sula Elementary School
- Tambilagao Elementary School
- Tambongon Elementary School
- Tanagan Elementary School
- Upper Bonga Elementary School
- Uson Elementary School
- Vinisitahan East Elementary School
- Vinisitahan South Elementary School

=== Secondary schools ===
- Bariw Integrated School - High School Department
- Bonga National High School
- Cabasan National High School
- Cawayan National High School
- Pili National High School
- San Pablo High School
- Sogod National High School
- Vinisitahan National High School
- Zamora Memorial College - High School Department

=== Higher educational institutions ===
- Bacacay Community College
- Zamora Memorial College

== Notable personalities ==
- Crispin Beltran - Filipino labor leader. Former member of 13th Congress of the Philippines with the Anakpawis ("Toiling Masses") party-list and former chair of Kilusang Mayo Uno (KMU), a militant and progressive labor movement.

== Gallery ==
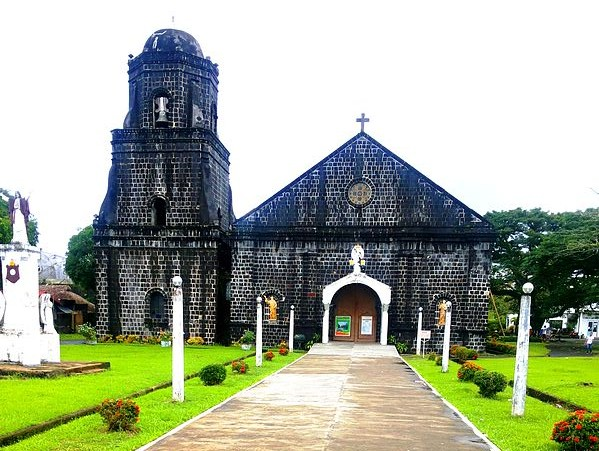
Bacacay Catholic Church

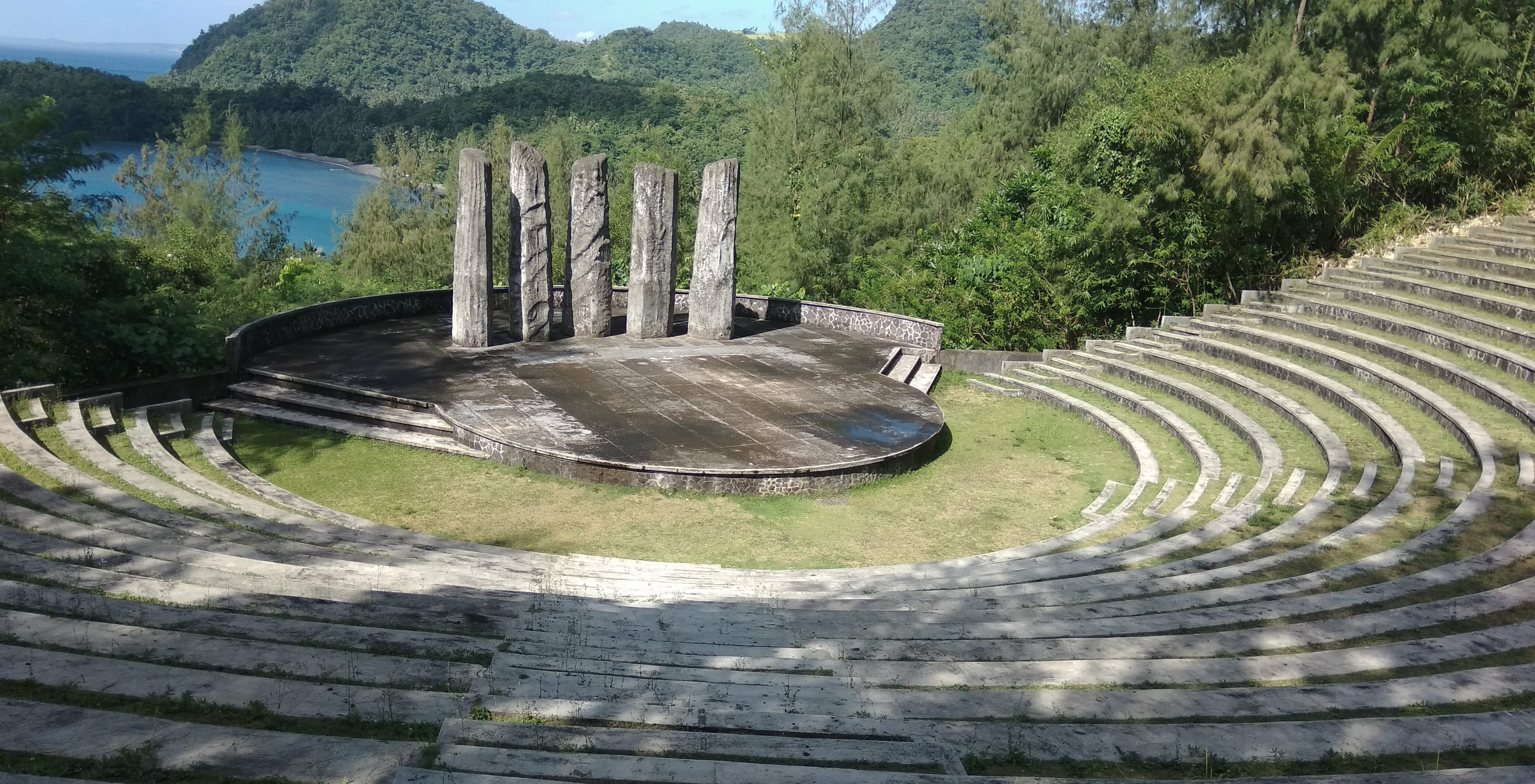
Cagraray Eco Park

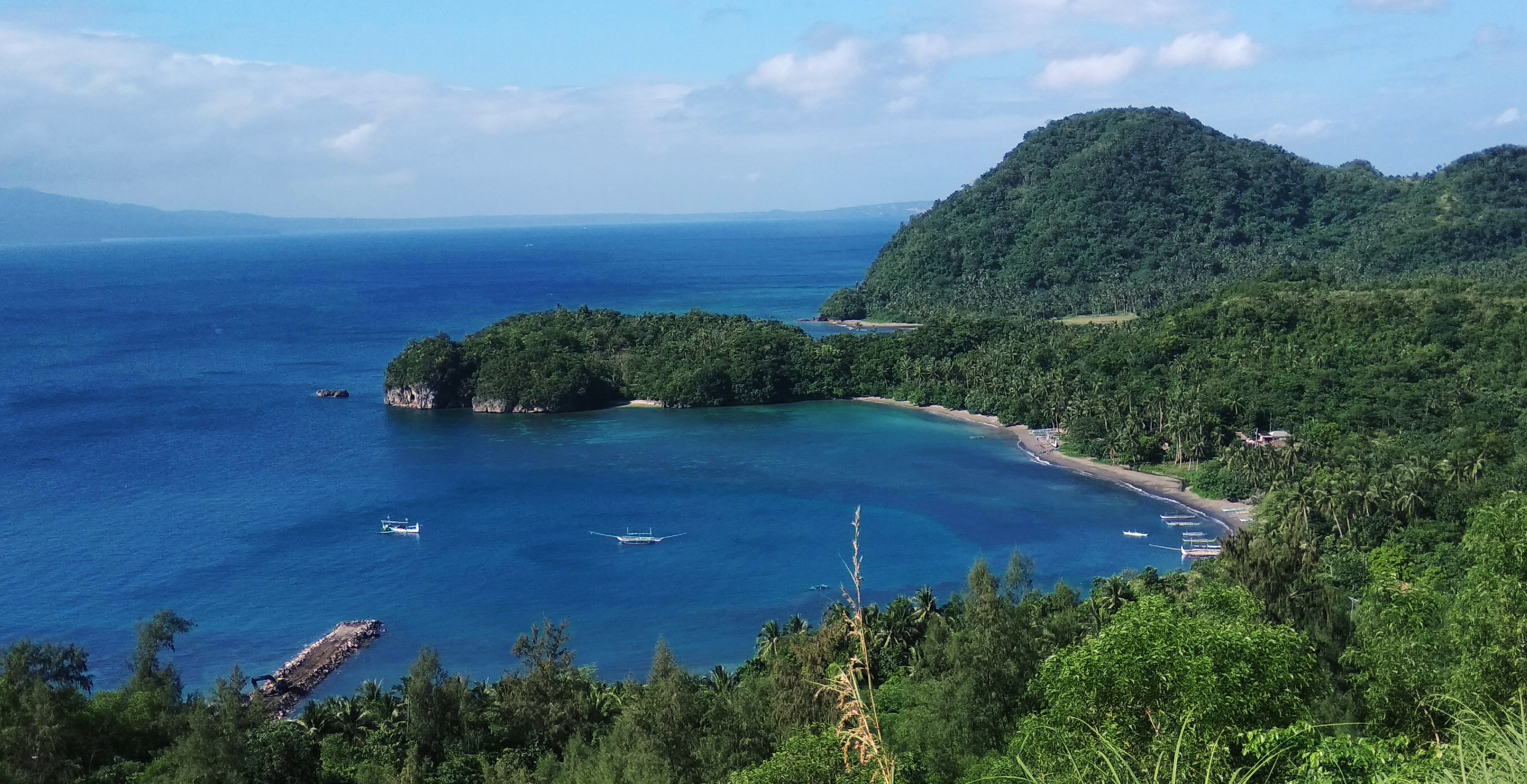
Cagraray Beach

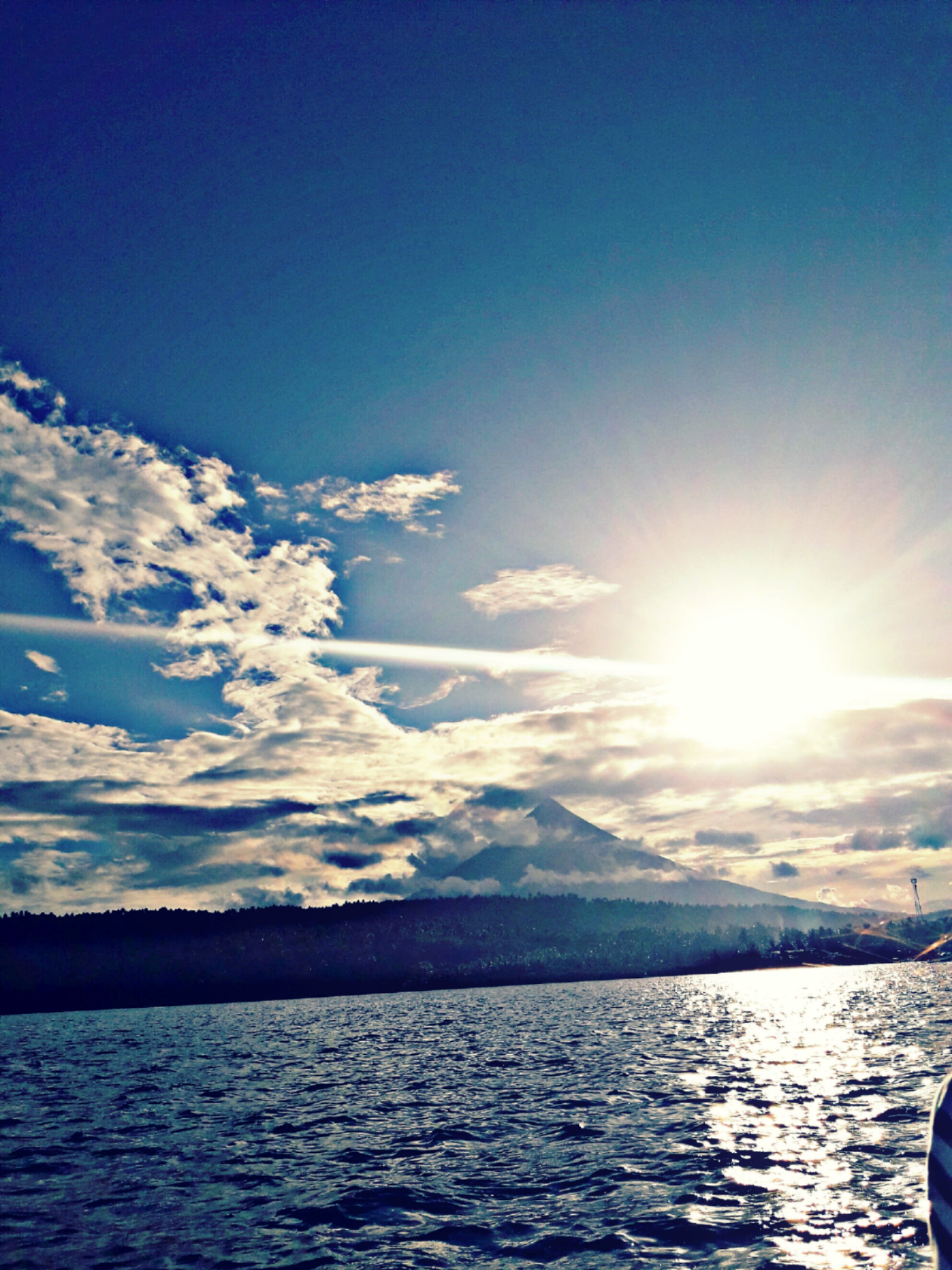
View of Mayon Volcano from Bacacay
