= Albay's 1st congressional district =

House of Representatives of the Philippines legislative district

- Constituency for the House of Representatives of the Philippines
- Map of Albay's 1st congressional district
- Location of Albay within the Philippines
- Province: Albay
- Region: Bicol Region
- Population: 395,907 (2020)
- Electorate: 274,872 (2025)
- Major settlements: 6 LGUs: Cities; Tabaco; Municipalities; Bacacay; Malilipot; Malinao; Santo Domingo; Tiwi
- Area: 547.88 km^{2} (211.54 sq mi)

Current constituency
- Created: 1907
- Representative: Krisel Lagman
- Political party: Liberal
- Congressional bloc: Minority

Albay's 1st congressional district is one of the three congressional districts of the Philippines in the province of Albay. It has been represented in the House of Representatives of the Philippines since 1916 and earlier in the Philippine Assembly from 1907 to 1916. The district consists of the northern Albay city of Tabaco and adjacent municipalities of Bacacay, Malilipot, Malinao, Santo Domingo and Tiwi. It is currently represented in the 20th Congress by Krisel Lagman of the Liberal Party (LP).

== List of members representing the district ==
=== Philippine Assembly (1907–1916) ===
No.	Portrait	Member	Term of office		Legislature	Party	Electoral history	Constituent LGUs
No.	Portrait	Member	Start	End	Legislature	Party	Electoral history	Constituent LGUs
District created January 9, 1907.
1		Tomas Almonte	October 16, 1907	October 16, 1909	1st Legislature	Nacionalista	Elected in 1907.	1907–1916; Bacacay, Malilipot, Malinao, Santo Domingo, Tabaco, Tiwi
2		Marcial Calleja	October 16, 1909	October 16, 1912	2nd Legislature	Progresista	Elected in 1909.	1907–1916; Bacacay, Malilipot, Malinao, Santo Domingo, Tabaco, Tiwi
3		Domingo Diaz	October 16, 1912	October 16, 1916	3rd Legislature	Nacionalista	Elected in 1912.	1907–1916; Bacacay, Malilipot, Malinao, Santo Domingo, Tabaco, Tiwi

=== House of Representatives (1916–1935) ===
No.	Portrait	Member	Term of office		Legislature	Party	Electoral history	Constituent LGUs
No.	Portrait	Member	Start	End	Legislature	Party	Electoral history	Constituent LGUs
(3)		Domingo Diaz	October 16, 1916	June 3, 1919	4th Legislature	Nacionalista	Re-elected in 1916.	1916–1935; Bacacay, Malilipot, Malinao, Santo Domingo, Tabaco, Tiwi
4		Agapito Buenconsejo	June 3, 1919	June 2, 1925	5th Legislature	Nacionalista	Elected in 1919.	1916–1935; Bacacay, Malilipot, Malinao, Santo Domingo, Tabaco, Tiwi
4		Agapito Buenconsejo	June 3, 1919	June 2, 1925	6th Legislature	Nacionalista Unipersonalista	Re-elected in 1922.	1916–1935; Bacacay, Malilipot, Malinao, Santo Domingo, Tabaco, Tiwi
5		Francisco B. Peña	June 2, 1925	June 5, 1928	7th Legislature	Nacionalista Consolidado	Elected in 1925.	1916–1935; Bacacay, Malilipot, Malinao, Santo Domingo, Tabaco, Tiwi
6		Julian Belen	June 5, 1928	June 2, 1931	8th Legislature	Nacionalista Consolidado	Elected in 1928.	1916–1935; Bacacay, Malilipot, Malinao, Santo Domingo, Tabaco, Tiwi
7		Froilan Pavericio	June 2, 1931	August 9, 1931	9th Legislature	Democrata	Elected in 1931. Died in office.	1916–1935; Bacacay, Malilipot, Malinao, Santo Domingo, Tabaco, Tiwi
8		Julian M. Locsin	September 3, 1931	January 31, 1933	9th Legislature	Nacionalista Consolidado	Elected in 1931 to finish Pavericio's term. Election annulled by House tribunal after electoral protest.	1916–1935; Bacacay, Malilipot, Malinao, Santo Domingo, Tabaco, Tiwi
9		Exequiel Kare	January 31, 1933	September 16, 1935	9th Legislature	Nacionalista Consolidado	Declared winner of 1931 special election.	1916–1935; Bacacay, Malilipot, Malinao, Santo Domingo, Tabaco, Tiwi
9		Exequiel Kare	January 31, 1933	September 16, 1935	10th Legislature	Nacionalista Democratico	Re-elected in 1934.	1916–1935; Bacacay, Malilipot, Malinao, Santo Domingo, Tabaco, Tiwi

=== National Assembly (1935–1945) ===
==== Commonwealth ====
No.	Portrait	Member	Term of office		Legislature	Party	Electoral history	Constituent LGUs
No.	Portrait	Member	Start	End	Legislature	Party	Electoral history	Constituent LGUs
10		Jose Bonto	November 15, 1935	December 30, 1941	1st National Assembly	Nacionalista Democratico	Elected in 1935.	1935–1941; Bacacay, Malilipot, Malinao, Santo Domingo, Tabaco, Tiwi
10		Jose Bonto	November 15, 1935	December 30, 1941	2nd National Assembly	Nacionalista	Re-elected in 1938.	1935–1941; Bacacay, Malilipot, Malinao, Santo Domingo, Tabaco, Tiwi
District dissolved into the two-seat Albay's at-large district for the Second Republic National Assembly.

=== House of Representatives (1945–1973) ===
No.	Portrait	Member	Term of office		Legislature	Party	Electoral history	Constituent LGUs
No.	Portrait	Member	Start	End	Legislature	Party	Electoral history	Constituent LGUs
District re-created May 24, 1945.
11		Isabelo Binamira	June 11, 1945	May 25, 1946	1st Commonwealth Congress	Nacionalista	Elected in 1941. Oath taking deferred.	1945–1973; Bacacay, Malilipot, Malinao, Santo Domingo, Tabaco, Tiwi
12		Eulogio Lawenko	May 25, 1946	December 30, 1949	2nd Commonwealth Congress	Nacionalista	Elected in 1946.	1945–1973; Bacacay, Malilipot, Malinao, Santo Domingo, Tabaco, Tiwi
12		Eulogio Lawenko	May 25, 1946	December 30, 1949	1st Congress	Nacionalista	Elected in 1946.	1945–1973; Bacacay, Malilipot, Malinao, Santo Domingo, Tabaco, Tiwi
13		Lorenzo Ziga	December 30, 1949	November 4, 1954	2nd Congress	Liberal	Elected in 1949.	1945–1973; Bacacay, Malilipot, Malinao, Santo Domingo, Tabaco, Tiwi
13		Lorenzo Ziga	December 30, 1949	November 4, 1954	3rd Congress	Liberal	Re-elected in 1953. Died in office.	1945–1973; Bacacay, Malilipot, Malinao, Santo Domingo, Tabaco, Tiwi
14		Tecla San Andres Ziga	November 8, 1955	December 30, 1961	3rd Congress	Liberal	Elected in 1955 to finish Ziga's term.	1945–1973; Bacacay, Malilipot, Malinao, Santo Domingo, Tabaco, Tiwi
14		Tecla San Andres Ziga	November 8, 1955	December 30, 1961	4th Congress	Liberal	Re-elected in 1957.	1945–1973; Bacacay, Malilipot, Malinao, Santo Domingo, Tabaco, Tiwi
15		Venancio Ziga	December 30, 1961	December 30, 1969	5th Congress	Liberal	Elected in 1961.	1945–1973; Bacacay, Malilipot, Malinao, Santo Domingo, Tabaco, Tiwi
15		Venancio Ziga	December 30, 1961	December 30, 1969	6th Congress	Liberal	Re-elected in 1965.	1945–1973; Bacacay, Malilipot, Malinao, Santo Domingo, Tabaco, Tiwi
16		Amando Cope	December 30, 1969	January 17, 1973	7th Congress	Nacionalista	Elected in 1969. Term cut short upon the ratification of a new Constitution.	1945–1973; Bacacay, Malilipot, Malinao, Santo Domingo, Tabaco, Tiwi
District dissolved into the twelve-seat Region V's at-large district for the Interim Batasang Pambansa, followed by the three-seat Albay's at-large district for the Regular Batasang Pambansa.

=== House of Representatives (1987–present) ===
No.	Portrait	Member	Term of office		Legislature	Party	Electoral history	Constituent LGUs
No.	Portrait	Member	Start	End	Legislature	Party	Electoral history	Constituent LGUs
District re-created February 2, 1987.
17		Edcel Lagman	June 30, 1987	June 30, 1998	8th Congress	LABAN	Elected in 1987.	1987–present Bacacay, Malilipot, Malinao, Santo Domingo, Tabaco, Tiwi
17		Edcel Lagman	June 30, 1987	June 30, 1998	9th Congress	LDP	Re-elected in 1992.	1987–present Bacacay, Malilipot, Malinao, Santo Domingo, Tabaco, Tiwi
17		Edcel Lagman	June 30, 1987	June 30, 1998	10th Congress	LDP	Re-elected in 1995.	1987–present Bacacay, Malilipot, Malinao, Santo Domingo, Tabaco, Tiwi
18		Krisel Lagman	June 30, 1998	June 30, 2004	11th Congress	LAMMP	Elected in 1998.	1987–present Bacacay, Malilipot, Malinao, Santo Domingo, Tabaco, Tiwi
18		Krisel Lagman	June 30, 1998	June 30, 2004	12th Congress	Lakas	Re-elected in 2001.	1987–present Bacacay, Malilipot, Malinao, Santo Domingo, Tabaco, Tiwi
(17)		Edcel Lagman	June 30, 2004	June 30, 2013	13th Congress	Lakas	Elected in 2004.	1987–present Bacacay, Malilipot, Malinao, Santo Domingo, Tabaco, Tiwi
(17)		Edcel Lagman	June 30, 2004	June 30, 2013	14th Congress	Lakas	Re-elected in 2007.	1987–present Bacacay, Malilipot, Malinao, Santo Domingo, Tabaco, Tiwi
(17)		Edcel Lagman	June 30, 2004	June 30, 2013	15th Congress	Liberal	Re-elected in 2010.	1987–present Bacacay, Malilipot, Malinao, Santo Domingo, Tabaco, Tiwi
19		Edcel Greco Lagman	June 30, 2013	June 30, 2016	16th Congress	Liberal	Elected in 2013.	1987–present Bacacay, Malilipot, Malinao, Santo Domingo, Tabaco, Tiwi
(17)		Edcel Lagman	June 30, 2016	January 30, 2025	17th Congress	Liberal	Elected in 2016.	1987–present Bacacay, Malilipot, Malinao, Santo Domingo, Tabaco, Tiwi
(17)		Edcel Lagman	June 30, 2016	January 30, 2025	18th Congress	Liberal	Re-elected in 2019.	1987–present Bacacay, Malilipot, Malinao, Santo Domingo, Tabaco, Tiwi
(17)		Edcel Lagman	June 30, 2016	January 30, 2025	19th Congress	Liberal	Re-elected in 2022. Died in office.	1987–present Bacacay, Malilipot, Malinao, Santo Domingo, Tabaco, Tiwi
Vacant			January 30, 2025	June 30, 2025	19th Congress	—	No special election held to fill vacancy.	1987–present Bacacay, Malilipot, Malinao, Santo Domingo, Tabaco, Tiwi
(18)		Krisel Lagman	June 30, 2025	Incumbent	20th Congress	Liberal	Elected in 2025.	1987–present Bacacay, Malilipot, Malinao, Santo Domingo, Tabaco, Tiwi

== Election results ==
=== 1953 ===
1953 Philippine House of Representatives elections in Albay
Party	Candidate	Votes	%
Liberal	Lorenzo Ziga (incumbent)	13,091	51.87%
Nacionalista	Antonio Bellen	12,127	48.05%
Independent	Apolonio Belen	14	0.06%
Liberal	Efren Borras	4	0.02%
Democratic	Salvador Balane	0	0.00%
Total votes		25,236	100.00
Liberal hold			

=== 1965 ===
1965 Philippine House of Representatives elections in Albay
Party	Candidate	Votes	%
Liberal	Venancio Ziga (incumbent)	15,394	39.10%
Nacionalista	Melchor Bañares	10,680	27.13%
Nacionalista	Salvador Balane	9,050	22.99%
Liberal	Elpidio Contante	3,541	8.99%
Progressive	Antonio Saqueton	270	0.69%
Liberal	Mariano Barateta	246	0.62%
Progressive	Felix Bonaobra	176	0.45%
Nacionalista	Ernesto Bernal	10	0.03%
Total votes		39,367	100.00
Liberal hold			

=== 1992 ===
1992 Philippine House of Representatives elections in Albay
Party	Candidate	Votes	%
LDP	Edcel Lagman (incumbent)	52,051	56.46%
LP–PDP	Antonio Betito	34,741	37.69%
Lakas	Jose Madrilejos Jr.	4,658	5.05%
KBL	Nelson Kallos	501	0.54%
PMP	Ysmael Zepeda	212	0.23%
KBL	Juan Casil	24	0.03%
Total votes		92,187	100.00
LDP hold			

=== 1995 ===
1995 Philippine House of Representatives elections in Albay
Party	Candidate	Votes	%
LDP	Edcel Lagman (incumbent)	57,939	57.59%
Lakas	Jesus Calisin	42,548	42.29%
Independent	Jose Bolo	113	0.11%
Total votes		100,600	100.00
LDP hold			

=== 1998 ===
1998 Philippine House of Representatives elections in Albay
Party	Candidate	Votes	%
LAMMP	Krisel Lagman	59,282	60.86%
Lakas	Antonio Betito	38,064	39.07%
Independent	Jose Bolo	69	0.07%
Total votes		97,415	100.00
LAMMP gain from LDP			

=== 2010 ===
2010 Philippine House of Representatives elections in Albay
Party	Candidate	Votes	%
Lakas–Kampi	Edcel Lagman (incumbent)	129,083	78.28
Liberal	Wilfredo Brizuela	24,993	15.15
Valid ballots		154,076	93.43
Invalid or blank votes		10,827	6.57
Total votes		164,903	100.00
Lakas–Kampi hold			

=== 2013 ===
2013 Philippine House of Representatives elections in Albay
Party	Candidate	Votes	%
Liberal	Edcel Greco Lagman	57,133	42.01
UNA	Ricky Ziga	55,011	40.45
PDP–Laban	Gregorio Luis Contacto	13,111	9.64
Total votes		136,014	100.00
Liberal hold			

=== 2016 ===
2016 Philippine House of Representatives elections in Albay
Party	Candidate	Votes	%
Liberal	Edcel Lagman (incumbent)	102,939	
NPC	Antonio Betito	52,555	
PDP–Laban	Gregorio Luis Contacto	16,316	
Total votes		189,617	100.00
Liberal hold			

=== 2019 ===
2019 Philippine House of Representatives elections in Albay
Party	Candidate	Votes	%
Liberal	Edcel Lagman (incumbent)	101,486	54.98
NPC	Herbie Aguas	81,128	43.95
Independent	Hernando Bruce	1,959	1.06
Total votes		200,923	100.00
Liberal hold			

=== 2022 ===
2022 Philippine House of Representatives elections in Albay
Party	Candidate	Votes	%
Liberal	Edcel Lagman (incumbent)	169,139	87.18
Independent	Rebecca Quijano	17,420	8.98
PGRP	Nards Bruce	4,275	2.20
Independent	Adela Pleshette Villar	3,175	1.64
Total votes		194,009	100.00
Liberal hold			

=== 2025 ===
2025 Philippine House of Representatives elections in Albay
Party	Candidate	Votes	%
Liberal	Krisel Lagman	128,871	54.48
Lakas	Jil Bongalon	107,656	45.52
Total votes		236,527	100.00
Liberal hold			

== See also ==
- Legislative districts of Albay
