= Tomas Almonte =

Filipino lawyer and politician

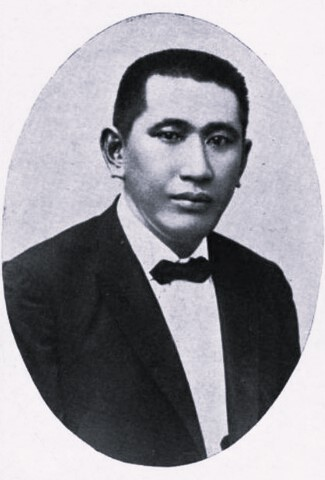
- Photograph from Album Histórico de la Primera Asamblea Filipina, 1908

Member of the Philippine Assembly from Albay's 1st district
- In office October 16, 1907 – October 16, 1909
- Preceded by: District established
- Succeeded by: Marcial Calleja

Personal details
- Born: December 29, 1866 Tabaco, Albay, Captaincy General of the Philippines
- Died: July 31, 1928 (aged 61) Tabaco, Albay, Philippine Islands
- Party: Nacionalista
- Education: University of Santo Tomas (LLB)

Tomas Almonte y Aldea (December 29, 1866 – July 31, 1928) was a Filipino lawyer and politician who served as the representative for Albay's 1st district in the Philippine Assembly from 1907 until 1909. He was a member of the Nacionalista Party.

== Life and career ==
Almonte was born on December 29, 1866, in the village of Tabaco, Albay. He received his early education from his mother and, at the age of 10, began his Latin studies at the Conciliar Seminary of Nueva Cáceres, where he continued his studies until 1885. He then pursued further studies at the University of Santo Tomas, studying law and graduating in 1893.

Almonte practiced law in Albay but found it inconvenient to continue the profession during the Spanish regime for political reasons. He turned to agriculture until the Philippine Revolution, when he was appointed Councilor of Justice in the province.

In July 1907, he was elected to the Philippine Assembly, representing Albay's 1st district. He served in the 1st Philippine Legislature until 1909.

House of Representatives of the Philippines
New district	Member of the Philippine Assembly for Albay's 1st district 1907–1909	Succeeded by Marcial Calleja
