= Emilio Espinosa Jr. =

Filipino politician (1923–2026)

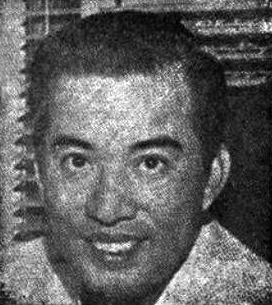
- Espinosa in 1967

Secretary of Labor
- In office December 30, 1965 – September 16, 1967
- President: Ferdinand Marcos
- Preceded by: Jose B. Lingad
- Succeeded by: Blas Ople

Deputy Speaker of the House of Representatives of the Philippines for Luzon
- In office July 27, 2004 – June 30, 2007
- Preceded by: Himself
- Succeeded by: Position abolished (deputy speakers are elected at-large)
- In office July 23, 2001 – June 30, 2004
- Preceded by: Carlos Padilla
- Succeeded by: Himself

Member of the Philippine House of Representatives from Masbate
- In office June 30, 1998 – June 30, 2007
- Preceded by: Luz Cleta Bakunawa
- Succeeded by: Antonio Kho
- Constituency: 2nd district
- In office December 30, 1969 – January 17, 1973
- Preceded by: Andres Clemente Jr.
- Succeeded by: District abolished (seat next held by Jolly Fernandez and Venancio Yaneza in the Regular Batasang Pambansa)
- In office December 30, 1957 – December 30, 1965
- Preceded by: Mateo Pecson
- Succeeded by: Andres Clemente Jr.
- Constituency: At-large district

Member of the Batasang Pambansa from Region V
- In office June 12, 1978 – June 30, 1984

Member of the Batasang Bayan from Region V
- In office September 21, 1976 – June 12, 1978

Governor of Masbate
- In office February 2, 1988 – June 30, 1998
- Preceded by: Juan Sanchez (acting)
- Succeeded by: Antonio Kho
- In office 1980–1986
- Preceded by: Cornelio Barrameda (OIC)
- Succeeded by: Romeo Mijares (OIC)
- In office 1975–1978
- Preceded by: Moises Espinosa
- Succeeded by: Cornelio Barrameda (OIC)

Personal details
- Born: Emilio de la Rosa Espinosa Jr. December 23, 1922 Cuyo, Palawan, Philippine Islands
- Died: January 18, 2026 (aged 103)
- Party: NPC (2001–2026)
- Other political affiliations: Lakas (1998–2001); KBL (1978–1988); Nacionalista (1957–1980)
- Spouse: Maria Fe Meliton
- Children: 2
- Parent(s): Emilio Espinosa Sr. Maria de la Rosa
- Education: Ateneo de Manila University (BS); University of the Philippines (LLB)
- Profession: Lawyer

Emilio "Miling" de la Rosa Espinosa Jr. (December 23, 1922 – January 18, 2026) was a Filipino lawyer and politician who served as secretary of labor from 1965 to 1967 and governor of Masbate from 1975 to 1978, 1980 to 1986, and 1988 to 1998. He also served as representative of Masbate's lone district from 1957 to 1965 and from 1969 to 1973, and of its 2nd district from 1998 to 2007. He was elected House deputy speaker for Luzon during the 12th and 13th Congresses.

== Early life and education ==
Espinosa was born on December 23, 1922, in Cuyo, Palawan, to former Masbate congressman and medical doctor Emilio Bartolabao Espinosa Sr. and Maria Zurbito de la Rosa. He studied at San Jacinto Primary School and Masbate Elementary School for his primary education, and at Masbate High School for his secondary education. Espinosa attended Ateneo de Manila University, where he earned a Bachelor of Science in Literature. He also attended the University of the Philippines, where he earned his Bachelor of Laws degree in 1949.

== Political career ==
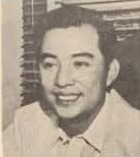
Espinosa as a congressman in 1963

=== Early political career ===
At the age of 18, Espinosa joined guerrilla forces during World War II. He was elected to the Masbate Provincial Board in 1955.

In 1957, Espinosa was first elected to the House of Representatives under the Nacionalista Party, representing Masbate's at-large district. He served in the 4th and 5th Congresses until 1965. In 1963, he was named by the Philippines Free Press as one of the country's 10 outstanding congressmen.

=== Cabinet service under Marcos ===
Espinosa was appointed by President Ferdinand Marcos as the first secretary of labor of his administration in December 1965. His tenure in the department was marked by a stronger push for the implementation of the minimum wage law, with Espinosa proposing stricter penalties for violating employers. He also ordered stricter enforcement of the eight-hour labor law and proposed overtime pay equivalent to 25% of a worker's regular salary for employees working beyond the prescribed limit. He left his cabinet post in September 1967 to run for the Senate.

=== Congressional return and first gubernatorial tenure ===
Espinosa was fielded by the Nacionalista Party as one of its eight candidates in the 1967 senatorial elections, but placed ninth, falling short by nearly 200,000 votes. He ran for another term in the House in 1969 and won, serving until the imposition of martial law in September 1972. In 1975, he was appointed governor of Masbate. In 1976, he concurrently served as a member of the Batasang Bayan, a presidential advisory body on legislation representing the Bicol Region.

=== Malacañang official and Batasang Pambansa ===
Espinosa briefly served as presidential executive assistant in Malacañang in 1969, and as Political Affairs Executive Assistant from 1972 to 1976. He ran and won under the banner of Kilusang Bagong Lipunan in the 1978 election for the Interim Batasang Pambansa as one of the representatives from Region V.

=== Second gubernatorial tenure ===
Espinosa later ran for governor of Masbate for a second term in 1980 while also serving in the national legislature. His term was cut short after the 1986 People Power Revolution, when President Corazon Aquino appointed officers in charge in various local government units. He later ran in the 1988 local elections, the first held under the new Constitution, and won three consecutive terms until 1998. It was in his term as governor in 1993 that the annual Rodeo Festival was first held.

=== Return to the House ===
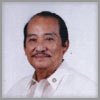
Espinosa in the 13th Congress

Espinosa returned to the House of Representatives in 1998, representing Masbate's 2nd district, and served until 2007. He authored notable legislation such as Republic Act (RA) No. 9239, or the Optical Media Act of 2003; RA No. 9208, or the Anti-Trafficking in Persons Act of 2003; and RA No. 8807, or the law converting the municipality of Masbate into the component city of Masbate. He was elected deputy speaker for Luzon on July 23, 2001, during the 12th Congress, and again on July 27, 2004, during the 13th Congress, under the speakership of Jose de Venecia Jr.

== Personal life and death ==
Espinosa was married to Maria Fe Meliton, with whom he had two children: Nanette and Carla. He was a brother of former Masbate 1st district representative Tito Espinosa.

He died on January 18, 2026, at the age of 103.

== Electoral history ==
Electoral history of Emilio Espinosa Jr.
Year	Office	Party	Votes received				Result
Year	Office	Party	Total	%	P.	Swing	Result
1957	Representative (Masbate at-large)	Nacionalista	—N/a	—N/a	1st	—N/a	Won
1961	Representative (Masbate at-large)	Nacionalista	—N/a	—N/a	1st	—N/a	Won
1969	Representative (Masbate at-large)	Nacionalista	—N/a	—N/a	1st	—N/a	Won
1967	Senator of the Philippines	Nacionalista	3,148,904	39.57	9th	—N/a	Lost
1978	Assemblyman (Region V)	KBL	560,624	5.17%	6th	—N/a	Won
1980	Governor of Masbate	KBL	—N/a	—N/a	1st	—N/a	Won
1988	Governor of Masbate	Unknown	—N/a	—N/a	1st	—N/a	Won
1998	Representative (Masbate–2nd)	Lakas	38,118	57.29%	1st	—N/a	Won
2001	Representative (Masbate–2nd)	NPC	—N/a	—N/a	1st	—N/a	Won
2004	Representative (Masbate–2nd)	NPC	—N/a	—N/a	1st	—N/a	Won

House of Representatives of the Philippines
Preceded by Himself	Deputy Speaker of the House of Representatives of the Philippines for Luzon; July 27, 2004 – June 30, 2007 (July 23, 2001 – June 30, 2004)	Position abolished (deputy speakers are elected at-large)
Preceded by Carlos Padilla	Deputy Speaker of the House of Representatives of the Philippines for Luzon; July 27, 2004 – June 30, 2007 (July 23, 2001 – June 30, 2004)	Succeeded by Himself
Preceded by Luz Cleta Bakunawa	Representative, Masbate's 2nd district June 30, 1998 – June 30, 2007	Succeeded by Antonio Kho
Preceded by Andres Clemente Jr.	Representative, Masbate's at-large district December 30, 1969 – January 17, 1973 (December 30, 1957 – December 30, 1965)	Vacant Martial law and adoption of the 1973 Constitution Title next held by Jolly Fernandez and Venancio Yaneza (in the Batasang Pambansa)
Preceded by Mateo Pecson	Representative, Masbate's at-large district December 30, 1969 – January 17, 1973 (December 30, 1957 – December 30, 1965)	Succeeded by Andres Clemente Jr.
Political offices
Preceded by Jose B. Lingad	Secretary of Labor; December 30, 1965 – September 16, 1967	Succeeded by Blas Ople
Preceded by Juan Sanchez (acting)	Governor of Masbate; February 2, 1988 – June 30, 1998 (1980–1986) (1975–1978)	Succeeded by Antonio Kho
Preceded by Cornelio Barrameda (OIC)	Governor of Masbate; February 2, 1988 – June 30, 1998 (1980–1986) (1975–1978)	Succeeded by Romeo Mijares (OIC)
Preceded by Moises Espinosa	Governor of Masbate; February 2, 1988 – June 30, 1998 (1980–1986) (1975–1978)	Succeeded by Cornelio Barrameda (OIC)
