= Region V's at-large parliamentary district =

Former Philippine parliamentary district

- Former constituency for the Interim Batasang Pambansa

Former constituency
- Created: 1978
- Abolished: 1984
- Seats: 12

Region V's at-large parliamentary district (also known as Bicol Region's at-large parliamentary district) was a constituency for the Interim Batasang Pambansa, the legislature of the Philippines from 1978 to 1984. It encompassed the provinces of Albay, Camarines Norte, Camarines Sur, Catanduanes, Masbate, and Sorsogon, together with the cities of Iriga, Legazpi, and Naga.

The district had 12 seats in the assembly, all of which were held by members of the ruling party Kilusang Bagong Lipunan.

== List of assemblymen representing the district ==
=== Batasang Pambansa (1978–1986) ===
Portrait	Member (Lifespan) (Province/City)	Term of office	Party	Legislature	Electoral history	Constituencies
District established February 7, 1978.
	Jose Alberto (1922–1989) (Catanduanes)	June 12, 1978 – June 30, 1984	KBL	Interim Batasang Pambansa	Elected in 1978.	1978–1984; Provinces: Albay, Camarines Norte, Camarines Sur, Catanduanes, Masbate, Sorsogon Cities: Iriga, Legazpi, Naga
	Ricardo Butalid (Masbate)	June 12, 1978 – June 30, 1984	KBL	Interim Batasang Pambansa	Elected in 1978.	1978–1984; Provinces: Albay, Camarines Norte, Camarines Sur, Catanduanes, Masbate, Sorsogon Cities: Iriga, Legazpi, Naga
	Socorro de Castro (Sorsogon)	June 12, 1978 – June 30, 1984	KBL	Interim Batasang Pambansa	Elected in 1978.	1978–1984; Provinces: Albay, Camarines Norte, Camarines Sur, Catanduanes, Masbate, Sorsogon Cities: Iriga, Legazpi, Naga
	Emilio Espinosa Jr. (1922–2026) (Masbate)	June 12, 1978 – June 30, 1984	KBL	Interim Batasang Pambansa	Elected in 1978.	1978–1984; Provinces: Albay, Camarines Norte, Camarines Sur, Catanduanes, Masbate, Sorsogon Cities: Iriga, Legazpi, Naga
	Arnulfo Fuentebella (1945–2020) (Camarines Sur)	June 12, 1978 – June 30, 1984	KBL	Interim Batasang Pambansa	Elected in 1978.	1978–1984; Provinces: Albay, Camarines Norte, Camarines Sur, Catanduanes, Masbate, Sorsogon Cities: Iriga, Legazpi, Naga
	Carlos R. Imperial (1930–2010) (Legazpi City)	June 12, 1978 – June 30, 1984	KBL	Interim Batasang Pambansa	Elected in 1978.	1978–1984; Provinces: Albay, Camarines Norte, Camarines Sur, Catanduanes, Masbate, Sorsogon Cities: Iriga, Legazpi, Naga
	Augusto Ortiz (Sorsogon)	June 12, 1978 – June 30, 1984	KBL	Interim Batasang Pambansa	Elected in 1978.	1978–1984; Provinces: Albay, Camarines Norte, Camarines Sur, Catanduanes, Masbate, Sorsogon Cities: Iriga, Legazpi, Naga
	Maximino Peralta (1935–2024) (Albay)	June 12, 1978 – June 30, 1984	KBL	Interim Batasang Pambansa	Elected in 1978.	1978–1984; Provinces: Albay, Camarines Norte, Camarines Sur, Catanduanes, Masbate, Sorsogon Cities: Iriga, Legazpi, Naga
	Marcial Pimentel (1921–2012) (Camarines Norte)	June 12, 1978 – June 30, 1984	KBL	Interim Batasang Pambansa	Elected in 1978.	1978–1984; Provinces: Albay, Camarines Norte, Camarines Sur, Catanduanes, Masbate, Sorsogon Cities: Iriga, Legazpi, Naga
	Dolores Sison (1919–2011) (Naga City)	June 12, 1978 – June 30, 1984	KBL	Interim Batasang Pambansa	Elected in 1978.	1978–1984; Provinces: Albay, Camarines Norte, Camarines Sur, Catanduanes, Masbate, Sorsogon Cities: Iriga, Legazpi, Naga
	Francisco Tatad (born 1939) (Catanduanes)	June 12, 1978 – June 30, 1984	KBL	Interim Batasang Pambansa	Elected in 1978.	1978–1984; Provinces: Albay, Camarines Norte, Camarines Sur, Catanduanes, Masbate, Sorsogon Cities: Iriga, Legazpi, Naga
	Luis Villafuerte (1935–2021) (Naga City)	June 12, 1978 – June 30, 1984	KBL	Interim Batasang Pambansa	Elected in 1978.	1978–1984; Provinces: Albay, Camarines Norte, Camarines Sur, Catanduanes, Masbate, Sorsogon Cities: Iriga, Legazpi, Naga
District dissolved into Albay's at-large, Camarines Norte's at-large, Camarines Sur's at-large, Catanduanes's at-large, Masbate's at-large, and Sorsogon's at-large districts.

== Election results ==
=== 1978 ===
Candidate	Party	Votes	%
Francisco Tatad	BLKNNL	688,928	6.35
Luis Villafuerte	BLKNNL	651,931	6.01
Dolores Sison	BLKNNL	586,421	5.40
Jose Alberto	BLKNNL	563,355	5.19
Arnulfo Fuentebella	BLKNNL	561,847	5.18
Emilio Espinosa Jr.	BLKNNL	560,624	5.17
Marcial Pimentel	BLKNNL	479,641	4.42
Augusto Ortiz	BLKNNL	478,150	4.41
Ricardo Butalid	BLKNNL	472,722	4.36
Carlos R. Imperial	BLKNNL	464,663	4.28
Maximino Peralta	BLKNNL	460,291	4.24
Socorro de Castro	BLKNNL	427,151	3.94
Eddie Alanis	Bicol Saro	426,749	3.93
Angelita Ago	Young Philippines	261,982	2.41
Hilario Abonal	Bicol Saro	226,515	2.09
Alfredo Tria	Bicol Saro	220,763	2.03
Mariano Trinidad	Bicol Saro	194,421	1.79
Wenceslao Vinzons Jr.	Young Philippines	189,541	1.75
Henry Fajardo	Bicol Saro	182,443	1.68
Salvador Princesa	Bicol Saro	176,046	1.62
Roger Panotes	Bicol Saro	175,482	1.62
Monico Imperial	Bicol Saro	174,544	1.61
Apolonio Maleniza	Independent	171,135	1.58
Victorino Ojeda	Bicol Saro	169,236	1.56
Gualberto Manlangit	Bicol Saro	159,400	1.47
Rolando Falcon	Independent	153,948	1.42
Mateo Esparrago Jr.	Young Philippines	148,948	1.37
Delfin de Vera	Young Philippines	146,080	1.35
Joseph Bunao	Independent	143,963	1.33
Jose Lachica	Young Philippines	133,626	1.23
Ireneo Reyes Jr.	Young Philippines	105,377	0.97
Publico Tibi Jr.	Young Philippines	104,490	0.96
Romulo Roy	Young Philippines	100,029	0.92
Matias Din	Young Philippines	95,681	0.88
Jerry Bañares	Young Philippines	94,862	0.87
Lino Azicate	Young Philippines	90,945	0.84
Luis Tayo	Independent	90,587	0.83
Jose Balde	Independent	86,643	0.80
Rodolfo Ante	Independent	79,328	0.73
Eduardo Pilapil	Independent	39,398	0.36
Porfirio Espeso	Independent	18,969	0.17
Jaime Hernandez	Independent	17,700	0.16
Jaime Veloso	Independent	16,322	0.15
Leonelo Opida	Independent	15,110	0.14
Felix Gimeno	Independent	8,220	0.08
Orlando Ailes	Independent	8,028	0.07
Joseph de Castro	Independent	7,364	0.07
Pio Camposano	Independent	4,782	0.04
Roberto Reverente	Independent	4,604	0.04
Tomas Broqueza	Independent	3,006	0.03
Reynesto Catapang	Emancipated Scientists Party	2,847	0.03
Venicio Flores	Independent	2,738	0.03
Pantaleon Panelo	Independent	2,273	0.02
Antonio Cope	Independent	2,017	0.02
Felix Belchez	Independent	1,644	0.02
Total		10,853,510	100.00
Total votes		1,245,428	–
Registered voters/turnout		1,422,763	87.54
