= Marcial Calleja =

Filipino lawyer and legislator

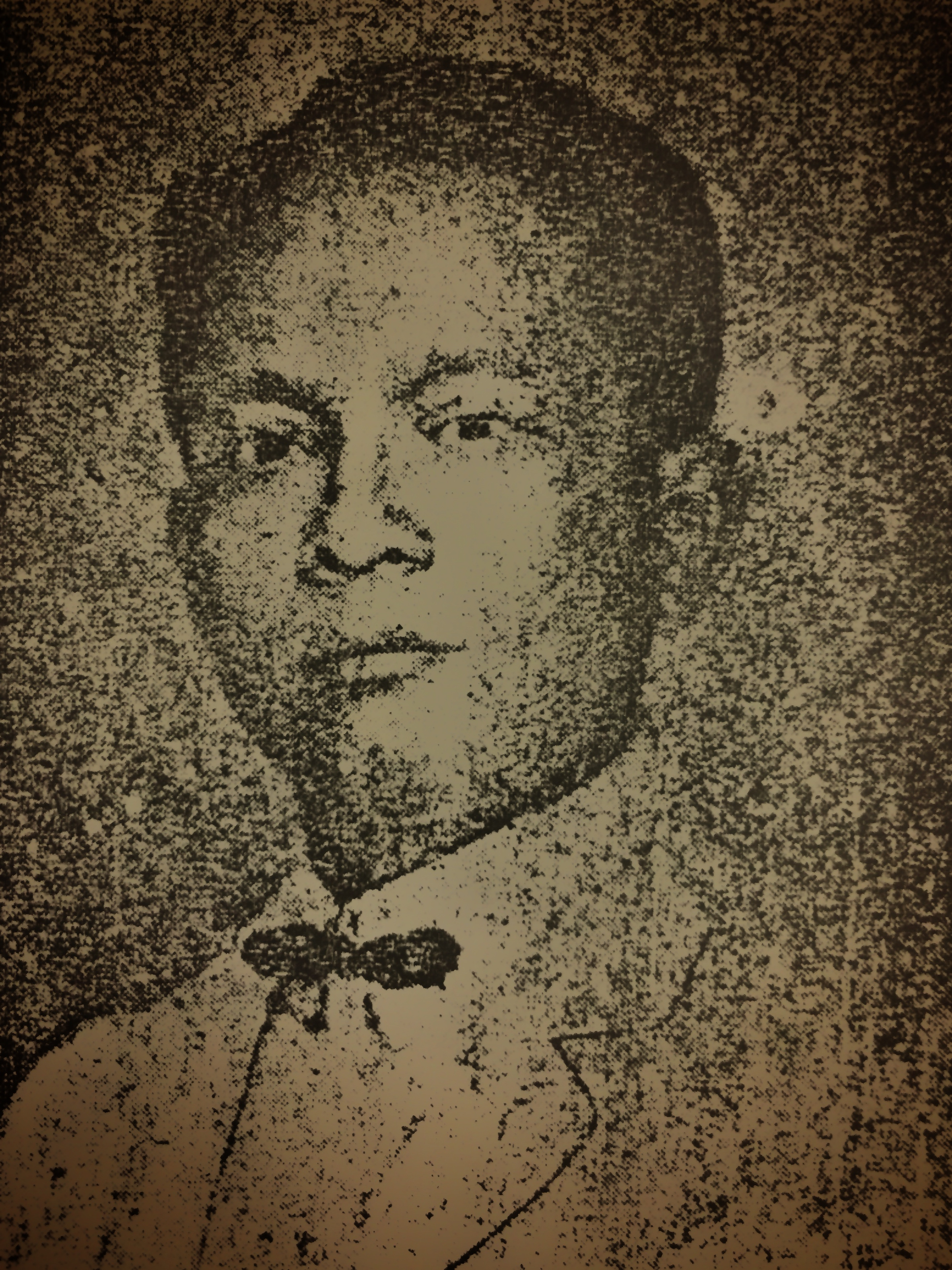

Member of the Philippine Assembly from Albay's 1st district
- In office October 16, 1909 – October 16, 1912
- Preceded by: Tomás Almonte
- Succeeded by: Domingo Díaz

Member of the Malolos Congress from Albay
- In office 1898–1899 Serving with Salvador V. del Rosario, Honorato Agrava, Pantaleón García, and Aguedo Velarde

Personal details
- Born: Martial Calleja y Casitas; August 22, 1863 Malinao, Albay, Captaincy General of the Philippines
- Died: May 5, 1914 (aged 50) Manila, Philippine Islands
- Resting place: La Loma Cemetery
- Party: Progresista (from 1900s)

Marcial Calleja y Casitas (August 22, 1863 – May 5, 1914) was a Filipino lawyer who was elected as one of the representatives of Albay to the Malolos Congress. He was also elected assemblyman for the first district of Albay in the Second Philippine Assembly.

== Early life and education ==
Calleja was born on August 22, 1863, in Malinao, Albay to Juan Calleja and Silvestre Casitas. He was the eldest of the three children.

He studied in the Seminary of Nueva Caceres for his segunda enseñanza (secondary education), and later on took a course in philosophy from the same institution. Then, he enrolled in the University of Santo Tomas where he received a title in agronomy in 1885. He was already starting his career when he returned to study law in the same university, graduating with a degree of Bachelor of Laws in 1894.

== Career ==
Soon after receiving his title in surveying, Calleja was appointed perito tasador del estado (state assessor) and was assigned in Laguna until 1891, when he was chosen as secretario de ayuntamiento (city council secretary) through a competitive test. He was first assigned in Albay and, later on, in Batangas (1889). In 1894 – 1895, he was the secretary of the Junta Central (central board) of the Albay delegation to the Exposición Regional de Filipinas that was held in Manila in 1895.

In 1898, under the revolutionary government, he became the city council secretary of Albay. In September of the same year, he became the consejero de justicia, juez instructor (instructional judge) and Asesor de Guerra (military adviser) of the Junta Revolucionaria for the province of Albay.

In the morning of December 22, 1898, after the local leaders of Albay took their oath of office before President Emilio Aguinaldo, Calleja, together with Salvador Vivencio del Rosario, was elected as a representative to the Malolos Congress and signatory to Malolos constitution.

He was captured during the Filipino-American War in July 1900. After his release, he joined the Federal Party and was appointed as provincial fiscal of Albay on May 13, 1901, serving until 1905. In 1904, he was part of the honorary board of Filipino commissioners who took part in the Louisiana Purchase Exposition under Dr. Trinidad Pardo de Tavera. Calleja received a gold medal of honour during the said exposition.

The following year, on April 1, 1905, he was appointed assistant attorney in the Attorney General’s office, a position which he held until he resigned on December 21, 1908.

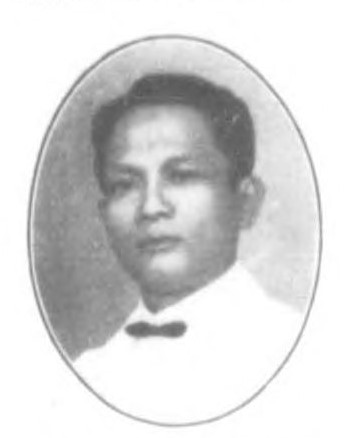
Calleja as a member of the Philippine Assembly, 1912

In 1909, Calleja was back in Albay conducting review classes for students taking the bar examinations. In the same year, he was elected assemblyman of the first district of Albay in the Second Philippine Assembly, where he participated in the passage of many significant municipal and provincial codes.

Shortly thereafter, however, he was stricken with paralysis, which restricted him to serve long in the Assembly.

== Personal life ==
Calleja was married to Teresa Asenjo of Albay with whom he had eight children. One of his children, Ambrosio A. Calleja, became a lawyer and a member of the Constitutional Convention of 1934 to 1935. He suffered from his paralysis for four years until his death on May 5, 1914. His remains were buried at the La Loma Cemetery.

Marcial Calleja became part of the Universidad de Santo Tomàs hall of fame (August 26, 1979).
