= Sorsogon's at-large congressional district =

At-large Philippine legislative district for Sorsogon

- Former constituency for the Malolos Congress, National Assembly of the Philippines and Batasang Pambansa
- Province: Sorsogon
- Region: Bicol Region (1984–1986)

Former constituency
- Created: 1898 (first creation); 1943 (second creation); 1984 (third creation)
- Abolished: 1907 (first abolition); 1945 (second abolition); 1986 (third abolition)

Sorsogon's at-large congressional district may refer to three occasions when a provincewide at-large district was used for elections to the various Philippine national legislatures representing Sorsogon.

From 1898 to 1901, three representatives appointed by President Emilio Aguinaldo sat in the Malolos Congress, the national assembly of the First Philippine Republic. Sorsogon was reorganized under the Philippine Insular Government in 1901 and was divided into two districts for the Philippine Assembly in 1907. From 1943 to 1944, the province as a whole sent two representatives to the national assembly during the Second Republic. Multiple-district representation was restored in the province in 1945.

In 1978, regional at-large assembly districts were created for the Interim Batasang Pambansa, the national parliament, with Sorsogon included in the 12-seat Region V at-large district. The province returned to its own single, multi-member at-large district in 1984, with a two-seat delegation to the Regular Batasang Pambansa during the Fourth Republic. After 1986, Sorsogon elected its representatives from its separate congressional districts. The district was last represented by Salvador Escudero and Augusto Ortiz of Kilusang Bagong Lipunan (KBL).

== List of members representing the district ==
=== Malolos Congress (1898–1901) ===
Seat A					Seat B					Seat C					Legislature	Constituency
Portrait	Member (Lifespan)	Term of office	Party	Electoral history	Portrait	Member (Lifespan)	Term of office	Party	Electoral history	Portrait	Member (Lifespan)	Term of office	Party	Electoral history	Legislature	Constituency
District created June 18, 1898.
	Maximino Hizon (1870–1901)	September 15, 1898 – March 23, 1901	Nonpartisan	Appointed by President Emilio Aguinaldo.		Pedro Lipana	September 15, 1898 – March 23, 1901	Nonpartisan	Appointed by President Emilio Aguinaldo.		Manuel Xerez Burgos	September 15, 1898 – March 23, 1901	Nonpartisan	Appointed by President Emilio Aguinaldo.	Malolos Congress	1898–1901 [data missing]
District dissolved into Sorsogon's 1st and 2nd districts for the Philippine Assembly.

=== National Assembly (1935–1944) ===
==== Second Republic ====
Seat A					Seat B					Legislature	Constituency
Portrait	Member (Lifespan)	Term of office	Party	Electoral history	Portrait	Member (Lifespan)	Term of office	Party	Electoral history	Legislature	Constituency
District re-created September 7, 1943.
	Manuel Estipona	September 25, 1943 – February 2, 1944	KALIBAPI	Elected in 1943.		Rafael Ramos	September 25, 1943 – February 2, 1944	KALIBAPI	Appointed as an ex officio member. (Note: As Governor of Sorsogon.)	National Assembly (Second Republic)	1943–1944 [data missing]
District dissolved into Sorsogon's 1st and 2nd districts for the House of Representatives.

=== Batasang Pambansa (1978–1986) ===
Seat A					Seat B					Legislature	Constituency
Portrait	Member (Lifespan)	Term of office	Party	Electoral history	Portrait	Member (Lifespan)	Term of office	Party	Electoral history	Legislature	Constituency
District re-created February 1, 1984.
	Salvador Escudero (1942–2012)	June 30, 1984 – March 25, 1986	KBL	Elected in 1984.		Augusto Ortiz	June 30, 1984 – March 25, 1986	KBL	Elected in 1984.	Regular Batasang Pambansa	1984–1986 [data missing]
District dissolved into Sorsogon's 1st and 2nd districts for the House of Representatives.

== Election results ==
=== 1984 ===
1984 Philippine parliamentary election in Sorsogon
Party	Candidate	Votes	%
KBL	Salvador Escudero	62,394	—
KBL	Augusto Ortiz	47,284	—
Nacionalista	Rafael Aquino	43,733	—
UNIDO	Redentor Guyala	23,417	—
Bicol Saro	Henry Fajardo	—	—
PDP–Laban	Elizalde Diaz	—	—
PDP–Laban	Celerina Gillego-Gotladera	—	—
Bicol Saro	Dominador Reyes	—	—
UNIDO	Teodoro de Vera Jr.	—	—
Sorsogon Action Party	Jose Sabater	—	—
Independent	Socorro de Castro	—	—
Independent	Manuel Fulgar	—	—
Independent	Fernando Gerona Jr.	—	—
Independent	Geronimo Gimeno	—	—
Independent	Domingo Lucenario	—	—
