= Masbate's at-large congressional district =

Legislative district of the Philippines

Masbate's at-large congressional district refers to the lone congressional district of the Philippines in the province of Masbate for various national legislatures before 1987. The province had its representatives elected or appointed province-wide at-large from its reorganization under Article 6 of the Decreto de 18 junio de 1898 y las instrucciones sobre el régimen de las provincias y pueblos for the Malolos Congress in 1898 until the creation of a first, second and third district on February 2, 1987. It was represented as a single-member district when it was re-established as a regular province separate from Sorsogon in 1920 and took part in five legislatures of the Insular Government of the Philippine Islands from 1922 to 1935, the three legislatures of the Philippine Commonwealth from 1935 to 1946, and the seven congresses of the Third Philippine Republic from 1946 to 1972.

Masbate was allocated an additional seat on three separate occasions in its history. From 1898 to 1901, the province, then known as Masbate y Ticao, was represented by two members in the National Assembly (Malolos Congress) of the First Philippine Republic, with a separate representation for the then island province of Burias. It also sent two representatives to the National Assembly of the Second Philippine Republic from 1943 to 1944 and the national parliament of the Fourth Philippine Republic from 1984 to 1986.

After 1986, all representatives were elected from its congressional districts.

== Representation history ==
#	Term of office		National Assembly	Seat A				Seat B			
#	Start	End	National Assembly	Image	Member	Party	Electoral history	Image	Member	Party	Electoral history
=== Masbate y Ticao's at-large district for the Malolos Congress ===
District created June 18, 1898.
–	September 15, 1898	March 23, 1901	1st		Alberto Barretto	Independent	Appointed.		Máximo Cabigting	Independent	Appointed.
#	Term of office		Legislature	Single seat				Seats eliminated			
#	Start	End	Legislature	Image	Member	Party	Electoral history	Seats eliminated			
=== Masbate's at-large district for the House of Representatives of the Philippine Islands ===								Seats eliminated			
District re-created December 15, 1920.								Seats eliminated			
1	June 6, 1922	June 2, 1925	6th		Pablo de la Rosa	Nacionalista; Unipersonalista	Redistricted from Sorsogon's 2nd district and re-elected in 1922.	Seats eliminated			
2	June 2, 1925	June 5, 1928	7th		Eduardo Marcaido	Nacionalista; Consolidado	Elected in 1925.	Seats eliminated			
3	June 5, 1928	June 5, 1934	8th		Pío V. Corpus	Nacionalista; Consolidado	Elected in 1928.	Seats eliminated			
3	June 5, 1928	June 5, 1934	9th		Pío V. Corpus	Nacionalista; Consolidado	Re-elected in 1931.	Seats eliminated			
4	June 5, 1934	September 16, 1935	10th		Emilio B. Espinosa	Nacionalista; Democrático	Elected in 1934.	Seats eliminated			
#	Term of office		National Assembly	Single seat				Seats eliminated			
#	Start	End	National Assembly	Image	Member	Party	Electoral history	Seats eliminated			
=== Masbate's at-large district for the National Assembly (Commonwealth of the Philippines) ===								Seats eliminated			
(3)	September 16, 1935	December 30, 1941	1st		Pío V. Corpus	Nacionalista; Democrático	Elected in 1935.	Seats eliminated			
(3)	September 16, 1935	December 30, 1941	2nd		Pío V. Corpus	Nacionalista	Re-elected in 1938.	Seats eliminated			
#	Term of office		National Assembly	Seat A				Seat B			
#	Start	End	National Assembly	Image	Member	Party	Electoral history	Image	Member	Party	Electoral history
=== Masbate's at-large district for the National Assembly (Second Philippine Republic) ===
District re-created September 7, 1943.
–	September 25, 1943	February 2, 1944	1st		Emilio B. Espinosa	KALIBAPI	Elected in 1943.		Pío V. Corpus	KALIBAPI	Appointed as an ex officio member.
#	Term of office		Common wealth Congress	Single seat				Seats eliminated			
#	Start	End	Common wealth Congress	Image	Member	Party	Electoral history	Seats eliminated			
=== Masbate's at-large district for the House of Representatives of the Commonwealth of the Philippines ===								Seats eliminated			
District re-created May 24, 1945.								Seats eliminated			
(4)	June 11, 1945	May 25, 1946	1st		Emilio B. Espinosa	Nacionalista	Elected in 1941.	Seats eliminated			
#	Term of office		Congress	Single seat				Seats eliminated			
#	Start	End	Congress	Image	Member	Party	Electoral history	Seats eliminated			
=== Masbate's at-large district for the House of Representatives of the Philippines ===								Seats eliminated			
(4)	May 25, 1946	December 30, 1953	1st		Emilio B. Espinosa	Liberal	Re-elected in 1946.	Seats eliminated			
(4)	May 25, 1946	December 30, 1953	2nd		Emilio B. Espinosa	Liberal	Re-elected in 1949.	Seats eliminated			
5	December 30, 1953	December 30, 1957	3rd		Mateo Pecson	Liberal	Elected in 1953.	Seats eliminated			
6	December 30, 1957	December 30, 1965	4th		Emilio R. Espinosa Jr.	Nacionalista	Elected in 1957.	Seats eliminated			
6	December 30, 1957	December 30, 1965	5th		Emilio R. Espinosa Jr.	Nacionalista	Re-elected in 1961.	Seats eliminated			
7	December 30, 1965	December 30, 1969	6th		Andrés Clemente Jr.	Nacionalista	Elected in 1965.	Seats eliminated			
(6)	December 30, 1969	September 23, 1972	7th		Emilio R. Espinosa Jr.	Nacionalista	Elected in 1969. Removed from office after imposition of martial law.	Seats eliminated			
District dissolved into the twelve-seat Region V's at-large district for the Interim Batasang Pambansa.								Seats eliminated			
#	Term of office		Batasang Pambansa	Seat A				Seat B			
#	Start	End	Batasang Pambansa	Image	Member	Party	Electoral history	Image	Member	Party	Electoral history
=== Masbate's at-large district for the Regular Batasang Pambansa ===
District re-created February 1, 1984.
–	July 23, 1984	March 25, 1986	2nd		Jolly T. Fernandez	UNIDO	Elected in 1984.		Venancio L. Yaneza	Independent	Elected in 1984. Died September 9, 1984.
District dissolved into Masbate's 1st, 2nd and 3rd districts.

== See also ==
- Legislative districts of Masbate
