= Camarines Sur's at-large congressional district =

At-large Philippine legislative district for Camarines Sur

- Former constituency for the Malolos Congress, National Assembly of the Philippines and Batasang Pambansa
- Province: Camarines Sur
- Region: Bicol Region (1984–1986)

Former constituency
- Created: 1943 (first creation); 1984 (second creation)
- Abolished: 1945 (first abolition); 1986 (second abolition)

Camarines Sur's at-large congressional district may refer to three occasions when a provincewide at-large district was used for elections to the various Philippine national legislatures representing Camarines Sur.

Camarines Sur was represented in the Philippine Legislature from 1919, when the province of Ambos Camarines was divided into Camarines Norte and Camarines Sur, until 1935, and later in the Commonwealth National Assembly from 1935 to 1941, by two districts. From 1943 to 1944, the province as a whole sent two representatives to the national assembly during the Second Republic. Multiple-district representation was restored in the province in 1945.

In 1978, regional at-large assembly districts were created for the Interim Batasang Pambansa, the national parliament, with Camarines Sur included in the 12-seat Region V at-large district. The province returned to its own single, multi-member at-large district in 1984, with a four-seat delegation to the Regular Batasang Pambansa during the Fourth Republic. After 1986, Camarines Sur elected its representatives from its separate congressional districts. The district was last represented by Ciriaco Alfelor, Rolando Andaya Sr., Edmundo B. Cea, and Luis Villafuerte of the United Nationalist Democratic Organization (UNIDO).

== List of members representing the district ==
=== National Assembly (1935–1944) ===
==== Second Republic ====
Seat A					Seat B					Legislature	Constituency
Portrait	Member (Lifespan)	Term of office	Party	Electoral history	Portrait	Member (Lifespan)	Term of office	Party	Electoral history	Legislature	Constituency
District re-created September 7, 1943.
	José Fuentebella (1883–1982)	September 25, 1943 – February 2, 1944	KALIBAPI	Elected in 1943.		Andres Hernandez	September 25, 1943 – February 2, 1944	KALIBAPI	Appointed as an ex officio member. (Note: As Governor of Camarines Sur.)	National Assembly (Second Republic)	1943–1944 [data missing]
District dissolved into Camarines Sur's 1st and 2nd districts for the House of Representatives.

=== Batasang Pambansa (1978–1986) ===
Seat A					Seat B					Seat C					Seat D					Legislature	Constituency
Portrait	Member (Lifespan)	Term of office	Party	Electoral history	Portrait	Member (Lifespan)	Term of office	Party	Electoral history	Portrait	Member (Lifespan)	Term of office	Party	Electoral history	Portrait	Member (Lifespan)	Term of office	Party	Electoral history	Legislature	Constituency
District re-created February 1, 1984.
	Ciriaco Alfelor	June 30, 1984 – March 25, 1986	UNIDO	Elected in 1984.		Rolando Andaya Sr. (1938–2001)	June 30, 1984 – March 25, 1986	UNIDO	Elected in 1984.		Edmundo B. Cea (1911–1993)	June 30, 1984 – March 25, 1986	UNIDO	Elected in 1984.		Luis Villafuerte (1935–2021)	June 30, 1984 – March 25, 1986	UNIDO	Elected in 1984.	Regular Batasang Pambansa	1984–1986 [data missing]
District dissolved into Camarines Sur's 1st, 2nd, 3rd, 4th districts for the House of Representatives.

== Election results ==
=== 1984 ===
1984 Philippine parliamentary election in Camarines Sur
Party	Candidate	Votes	%
UNIDO	Luis Villafuerte	245,922	16.99
UNIDO	Ciriaco Alfelor	233,433	16.12
UNIDO	Edmundo B. Cea	222,413	15.36
UNIDO	Rolando Andaya Sr.	218,013	15.06
KBL	Arnulfo Fuentebella	107,252	7.41
KBL	Salvador Bigay	89,719	6.20
KBL	Juan Triviño	67,705	4.68
KBL	Lorenzo Ballecer	64,398	4.45
PDP–Laban	Jesus Antonio Carpio Sr.	59,018	4.08
PDP–Laban	Salvador Tuy Jr.	48,768	3.37
PDP–Laban	Rodolfo Villanueva	45,890	3.17
Independent	Eduardo Lopes	21,444	1.48
Independent	Mauro Magistrado	15,754	1.09
Independent	Marciano Trinidad	8,001	0.55
