= Zamora Memorial College =

Private college in Albay, Philippines

- Motto: Bringing Possibilities
- Established: 24 October 1948
- Founders: Crispin B. Vergara, Sr.
- President: Venecia M. Bellen
- Dean: Dr. Grace Montales
- Faculty: 26 (High School)
- Students: approx. 2000; College (500); Senior High School (500); Junior High School (1000)
- Location: Santo Niño St., Bacacay, Albay, Philippines; 13°17′31″N 123°47′40″E
- Campus: Urban 3.7 acre (15000 m^{2})
- Team name: Blue Marlins
- Colors: Blue (Primary); White (Secondary)
- Website: zamoramemorialcollege.blogspot.sg
- Location in Albay Location in Luzon Location in the Philippines

Zamora Memorial College (abbreviation: ZMC) is a private school in Bacacay, Albay, Philippines, that offers secondary and tertiary education. Founded in 1948 by Crispin Bermas Vergara, Sr., its name commemorates Friar Juan Zamora of Tayabas, Quezon, the founder of the first collegiate school in Albay.

== History ==
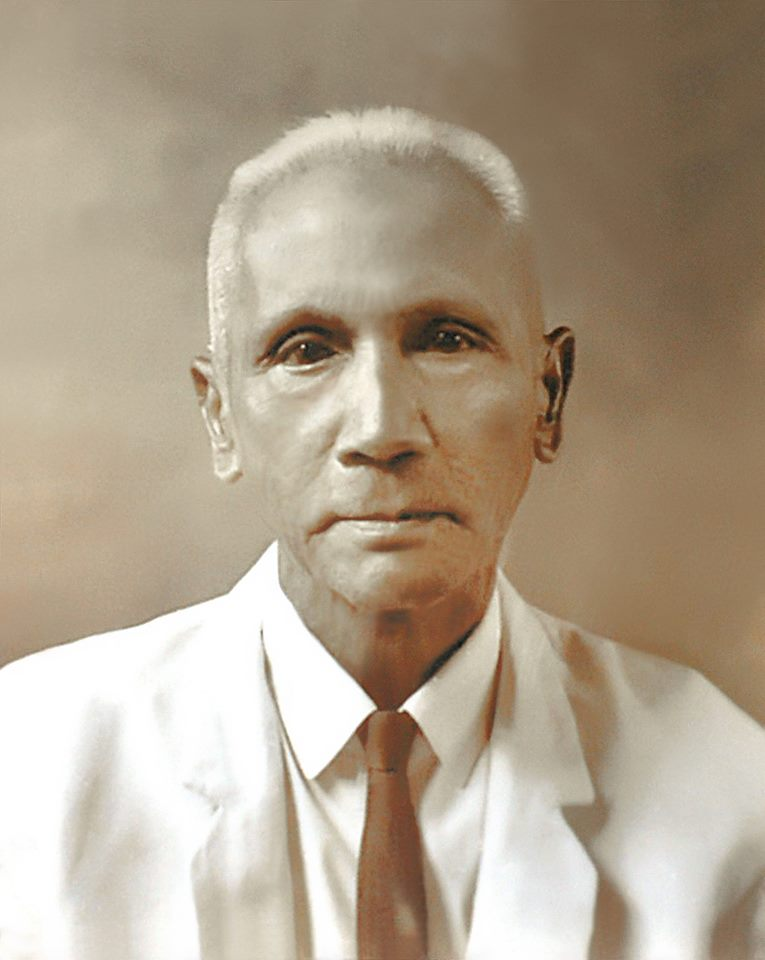
Crispin B. Vergara, Sr. 24 October 1897-5 April 1976

Zamora Memorial College was founded as Zamora Memorial Institute on October 24, 1948 by Crispin Bermas Vergara, a retired supervisor of the Division of Albay. This was in response to the growing need for secondary education of Bacacayanos. At that time, only the upper middle class Bacacayanos have access to secondary education because high schools were only available in Legazpi or Tabaco.

The first campus of the institute was a rented building located in the corner of Bes and Barrameda Streets in Bacacay. A typhoon struck and the building was destroyed.

Several parents and benefactors helped in reconstructing the school. For its new site, Mr. Vergara purchased a 3.7 acre parcel of land from Doña Beatrice Alparce which to this day is the present site of the school. The first school building constructed was made of bamboo and nipa. Through the years, this building was replaced by concrete building to withstand typhoons which frequently visit the town. Additional concrete buildings were subsequently constructed to accommodate the growing number of enrollment.

In 1996, with the growing clamor for access to tertiary education in Bacacay, the Board of Trustees responded with the opening of the college department. At the time of its opening, it was fully recognized by the Commission on Higher Education. It started with two students and part-time faculty with classes in the evening. Through the years, the number of enrollment increase to approximately 500 students. With a substantial number of graduating students, in 2013, the College Department conducted a separate Commencement Exercises from High School Department.

Starting School Year 2011 - 2012, the school transitioned to K-12 curriculum pursuant to the Department of Education directive. Consequently, the Senior High School was commenced during School Year 2016-2017.

== Curriculum ==
=== College Department ===
The College Department offers the following degree courses:

=== Bachelor of Elementary Education ===
The Bachelor of Elementary Education (BEED) is a four-year degree program designed to prepare students to become primary school teachers.

=== Bachelor of Secondary Education ===
The Bachelor of Secondary Education (BSEd) is a four-year degree program designed to prepare students for becoming high school teachers. The program combines both theory and practice in order to teach students the necessary knowledge and skills a high school teacher needs. The BSEd program trains students to teach one of the different learning areas such as English, Mathematics, General Science, Filipino, Social Studies, Biological Sciences, Physics, Chemistry, Music, Arts, Physical Education and Health (MAPEH) and Home Economics and Livelihood Education.

=== Certificate for Professional Teaching ===
The Certificate for Professional Teaching (CPT) program is for individuals who have finished any four-year non-education degree course who want to pursue master's degree in Education and want to teach or who aim to have personal professional development and continuing education.

=== High School Departments ===
Both the Junior and Senior High School Departments offer K-12 Curriculum.

== Scholarship Grants ==
Various scholarship grants are available for both college and high school students. These grants are listed below.

=== College Department ===
1. CHED-STUFAPS
2. Student Assistantships
3. CSCDI Scholarships
4. CFCA Scholarships

=== Senior High School Department ===
1. Department of Education Voucher

=== Junior High School Department ===
1. DepEd-FAPE Educational Service Contracting Program (GATSPE Law)
2. Edgardo V. Lawenko Scholarship
3. Scholarships for the Best and Brightest Students
4. CSCDI Scholarship
5. CFCA Scholarship

== Campus ==
The ZMC campus is nestled on a 3.7 acre of land located at the town center of Bacacay, Albay.

Facilities include:

- The Crispin B. Vergara Hall, which houses the administration office, Senior High School Department, library, and science and TESDA laboratories.
- The Cora T. Vergara Hall, which houses the College Department
- The Arsenio B. Vergara Gymnasium
- Design Technology Workshops
- Guidance Office
- Outdoor Stage
- Basketball Court
- Botanical Garden
- Mentor's Building
- Junior's Building

== See also ==
- Education in the Philippines
- Commission on Higher Education (Philippines)
- Department of Education (Philippines)
- Fund for Assistance to Private Education
- Technical Education and Skills Development Authority
