= Malilipot =

Municipality in Albay, Philippines

- Municipality
- Municipality of Malilipot
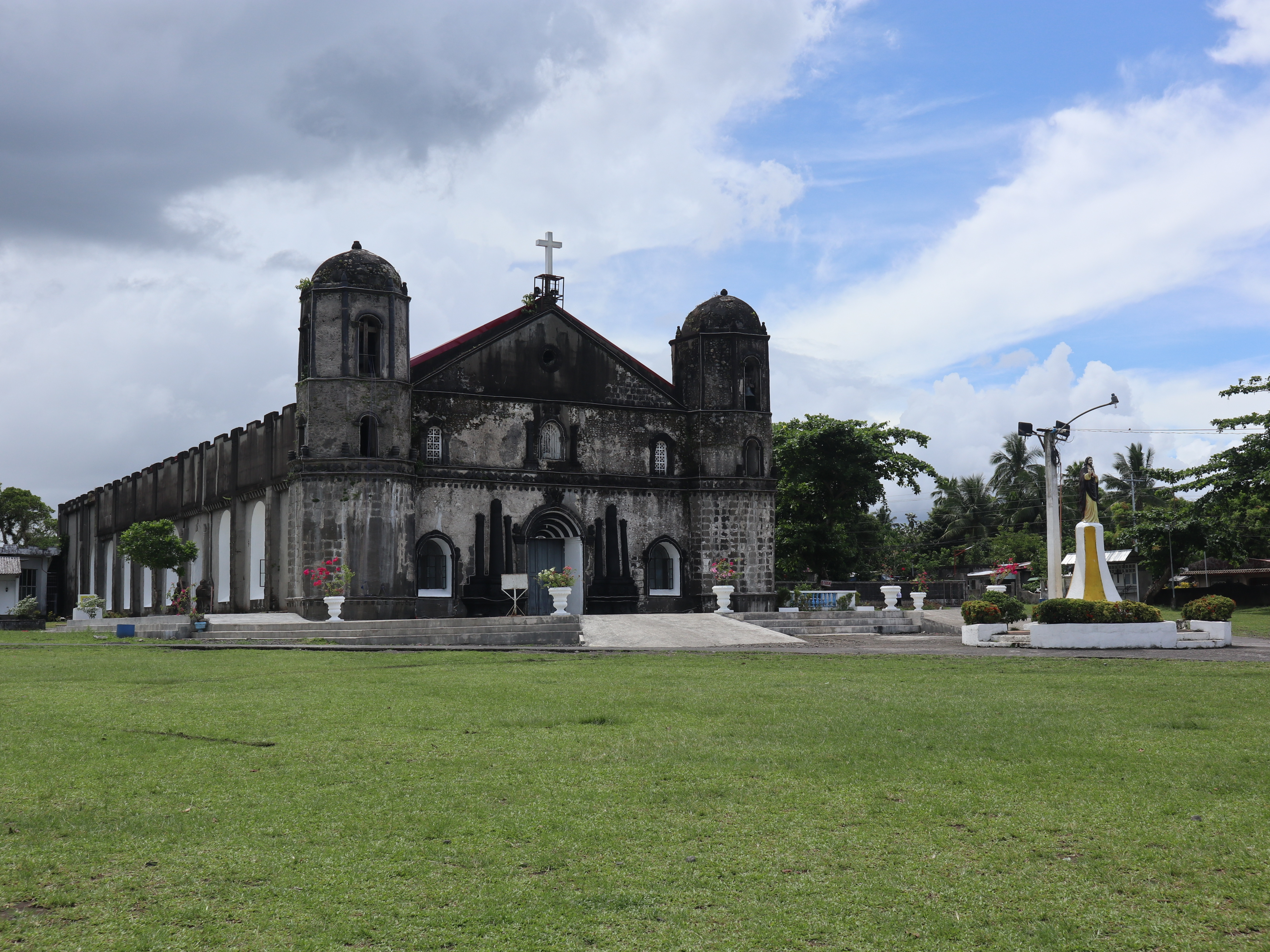
- Our Lady of Mount Carmel Church in Malilipot

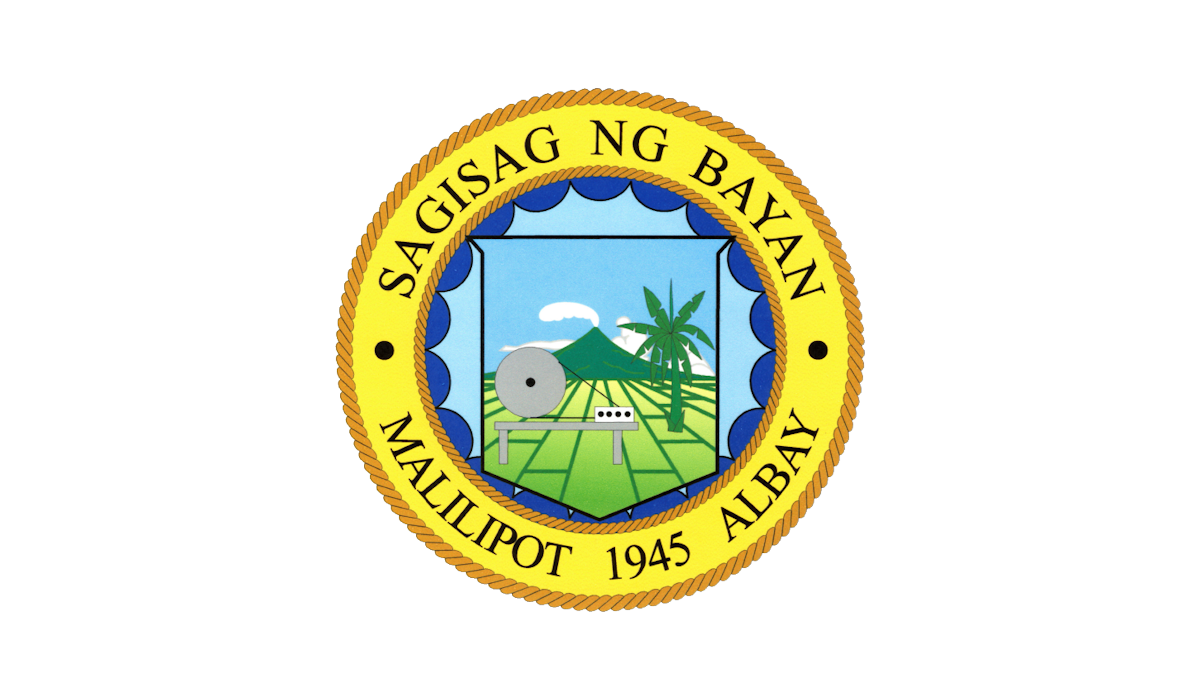
- Flag

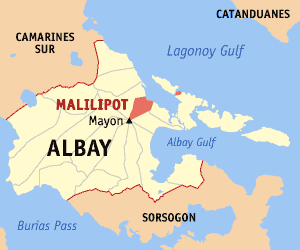
- Map of Albay with Malilipot highlighted
- Interactive map of Malilipot
- Location within the Philippines
- Coordinates: 13°19′N 123°44′E
- Country: Philippines
- Region: Bicol Region
- Province: Albay
- District: 1st district
- Barangays: 18 (see Barangays)

Government
  - Type: Sangguniang Bayan
  - Mayor: Cenon Volante
  - Vice Mayor: Rolando B. Volante
  - Representative: Krisel Lagman
  - Municipal Council: Members: Jose B. Bolaños; Nong Ampig; Roberto Bertillo; Baba Belen; Dennis Thomas C. Bitara; Kap Dianna Bitara; Joy Bisoña; Joephil C. Bien
  - Electorate: 32,016 voters (2025)

Area
  - Total: 44.13 km^{2} (17.04 sq mi)
- Elevation: 128 m (420 ft)
- Highest elevation: 1,134 m (3,720 ft)
- Lowest elevation: 0 m (0 ft)

Population (2024 census)
  - Total: 41,066
  - Density: 930.6/km^{2} (2,410/sq mi)
  - Households: 9,233
- Demonym: Malilipoteño

Economy
  - Income class: 1st municipal income class
  - Poverty incidence: 25.79% (2023)
  - Revenue: ₱ 167.5 million (2024)
  - Assets: ₱ 721 million (2024)
  - Expenditure: ₱ 94.52 million (2024)
  - Liabilities: ₱ 107.9 million (2024)

Service provider
  - Electricity: Albay Electric Cooperative (ALECO)
- Time zone: UTC+8 (PST)
- ZIP code: 4510
- PSGC: 0500509000
- IDD : area code: +63 (0)52
- Native languages: Central Bikol; Tagalog
- Catholic diocese: Diocese of Legazpi

Malilipot, officially the Municipality of Malilipot (Central Bikol: Banwaan kan Malilipot; Tagalog: Bayan ng Malilipot), is a municipality in the province of Albay, Philippines. According to the 2024 census, it has a population of 41,066 people.

It is situated at the base of Mayon Volcano, the municipality is a town in the Bicol Region. It is known for its green scenery and waterfalls. The Lubid Festival is also celebrated here typically during July 9 to 16.

== History ==
Malilipot traces its history to the expedition of Juan de Salcedo in 1573 and the colonization of Albay Bay, now called Albay, with 120 soldiers and guides. During these period, towns were established. Libon was founded in 1573, Polangui in 1589, Oas in 1587, and Malinao in 1600. Other municipalities were established in succession. By 1818 Malilipot was called San Jose, and that the 1818 census showed 1,829 native families paying tribute and they were coexisting with 114 Spanish-Filipino families.

Malilipot was officially founded as a municipality on October 26, 1945.

== Geography ==
Malilipot is located at 13°19′N 123°44′E.

According to the Philippine Statistics Authority, the municipality has a land area of 44.13 square kilometres (17.04 sq mi) constituting 1.71% of the 2,575.77-square-kilometre- (994.51 sq mi) total area of Albay. It is 20 kilometres (12 mi) from Legazpi City and 547 kilometres (340 mi) from Manila.

=== Barangays ===
Malilipot is politically subdivided into 18 barangays. Each barangay consists of puroks and some have sitios.

The sitios of Calbayog and Canaway were converted into a barrios in 1959 and 1957, respectively.

| PSGC | Barangay | Population | | | ±% p.a. | |
| | | 2024 | | 2010 | | |
|---|---|---|---|---|---|---|
| 050509004 | Barangay I (Poblacion) | 5.2% | 2,152 | 2,075 | ▴ | 0.25% |
| 050509005 | Barangay II (Poblacion) | 1.5% | 597 | 540 | ▴ | 0.69% |
| 050509006 | Barangay III (Poblacion) | 3.2% | 1,295 | 1,164 | ▴ | 0.74% |
| 050509007 | Barangay IV (Poblacion) | 3.9% | 1,614 | 1,524 | ▴ | 0.40% |
| 050509008 | Barangay V (Poblacion) | 3.1% | 1,264 | 1,122 | ▴ | 0.83% |
| 050509001 | Binitayan | 4.5% | 1,834 | 1,654 | ▴ | 0.72% |
| 050509002 | Calbayog | 5.1% | 2,094 | 2,029 | ▴ | 0.22% |
| 050509003 | Canaway | 6.3% | 2,599 | 2,425 | ▴ | 0.48% |
| 050509009 | Salvacion | 2.9% | 1,176 | 1,220 | ▾ | −0.25% |
| 050509010 | San Antonio Santicon | 1.9% | 791 | 762 | ▴ | 0.26% |
| 050509011 | San Antonio Sulong | 1.9% | 794 | 792 | ▴ | 0.02% |
| 050509012 | San Francisco | 3.8% | 1,565 | 1,476 | ▴ | 0.40% |
| 050509013 | San Isidro Ilawod | 9.0% | 3,705 | 3,528 | ▴ | 0.34% |
| 050509014 | San Isidro Iraya | 11.4% | 4,686 | 4,330 | ▴ | 0.55% |
| 050509015 | San Jose (Balite) | 12.4% | 5,110 | 4,715 | ▴ | 0.56% |
| 050509016 | San Roque | 5.5% | 2,277 | 2,047 | ▴ | 0.74% |
| 050509017 | Santa Cruz | 4.0% | 1,659 | 1,599 | ▴ | 0.25% |
| 050509018 | Santa Teresa (Malada) | 6.3% | 2,573 | 2,565 | ▴ | 0.02% |
| | Total | | 41,066 | 35,567 | ▴ | 1.00% |

=== Climate ===
Climate data for Malilipot, Albay
| Month | Jan | Feb | Mar | Apr | May | Jun | Jul | Aug | Sep | Oct | Nov | Dec | Year |
|---|---|---|---|---|---|---|---|---|---|---|---|---|---|
| Mean daily maximum °C (°F) | 26 (79) | 27 (81) | 28 (82) | 30 (86) | 31 (88) | 30 (86) | 29 (84) | 29 (84) | 29 (84) | 29 (84) | 28 (82) | 27 (81) | 29 (83) |
| Mean daily minimum °C (°F) | 22 (72) | 22 (72) | 23 (73) | 24 (75) | 25 (77) | 25 (77) | 25 (77) | 25 (77) | 25 (77) | 24 (75) | 24 (75) | 23 (73) | 24 (75) |
| Average precipitation mm (inches) | 138 (5.4) | 83 (3.3) | 74 (2.9) | 50 (2.0) | 108 (4.3) | 165 (6.5) | 202 (8.0) | 165 (6.5) | 190 (7.5) | 186 (7.3) | 188 (7.4) | 183 (7.2) | 1,732 (68.3) |
| Average rainy days | 16.8 | 11.9 | 13.5 | 13.8 | 20.5 | 25.2 | 27.4 | 26.2 | 26.1 | 24.7 | 20.7 | 18.5 | 245.3 |
Source: Meteoblue

== Demographics ==
Population census of Malilipot
| Year | Pop. | ±% p.a. |
|---|---|---|
| 1903 | 5,501 | — |
| 1918 | 7,272 | +1.88% |
| 1939 | 8,525 | +0.76% |
| 1948 | 9,971 | +1.76% |
| 1960 | 13,076 | +2.28% |
| 1970 | 17,455 | +2.93% |
| 1975 | 20,497 | +3.27% |
| 1980 | 23,238 | +2.54% |
| 1990 | 24,160 | +0.39% |
| 1995 | 26,834 | +1.99% |
| 2000 | 29,541 | +2.08% |
| 2007 | 33,593 | +1.79% |
| 2010 | 35,567 | +2.10% |
| 2015 | 37,785 | +1.16% |
| 2020 | 40,857 | +1.66% |
| 2024 | 41,066 | +0.12% |
Source: Philippine Statistics Authority

In the 2024 census, Malilipot had a population of 41,066 people. The population density was 930 inhabitants per square kilometre (2,400/sq mi).

== Economy ==
Poverty incidence of Malilipot (%)

Source: Philippine Statistics Authority

== Education ==
The Malilipot Schools District Office governs all educational institutions within the municipality. It oversees the management and operations of all private and public, from primary to secondary schools.

=== Primary and elementary schools ===
- Basud Elementary School
- Binitayan Elementary School
- Calbayog Elementary School
- Canaway Elementary School
- Malilipot Central School
- Salvacion Elementary School
- San Antonio Elementary School
- San Francisco Learning Center
- San Isidro East Elementary School
- San Isidro West Elementary School
- San Jose Elementary School
- San Roque Elementary School
- Sta. Cruz Elementary School
- Sta. Teresa Elementary School

=== Secondary schools ===
- Malilipot National High School
- San Antonio National High School
- San Francisco National High School
- San Isidro National High School
- San Jose National High School
