= Santo Domingo, Albay =

Municipality in Albay, Philippines

Santo Domingo Libog
- Municipality
- Municipality of Santo Domingo
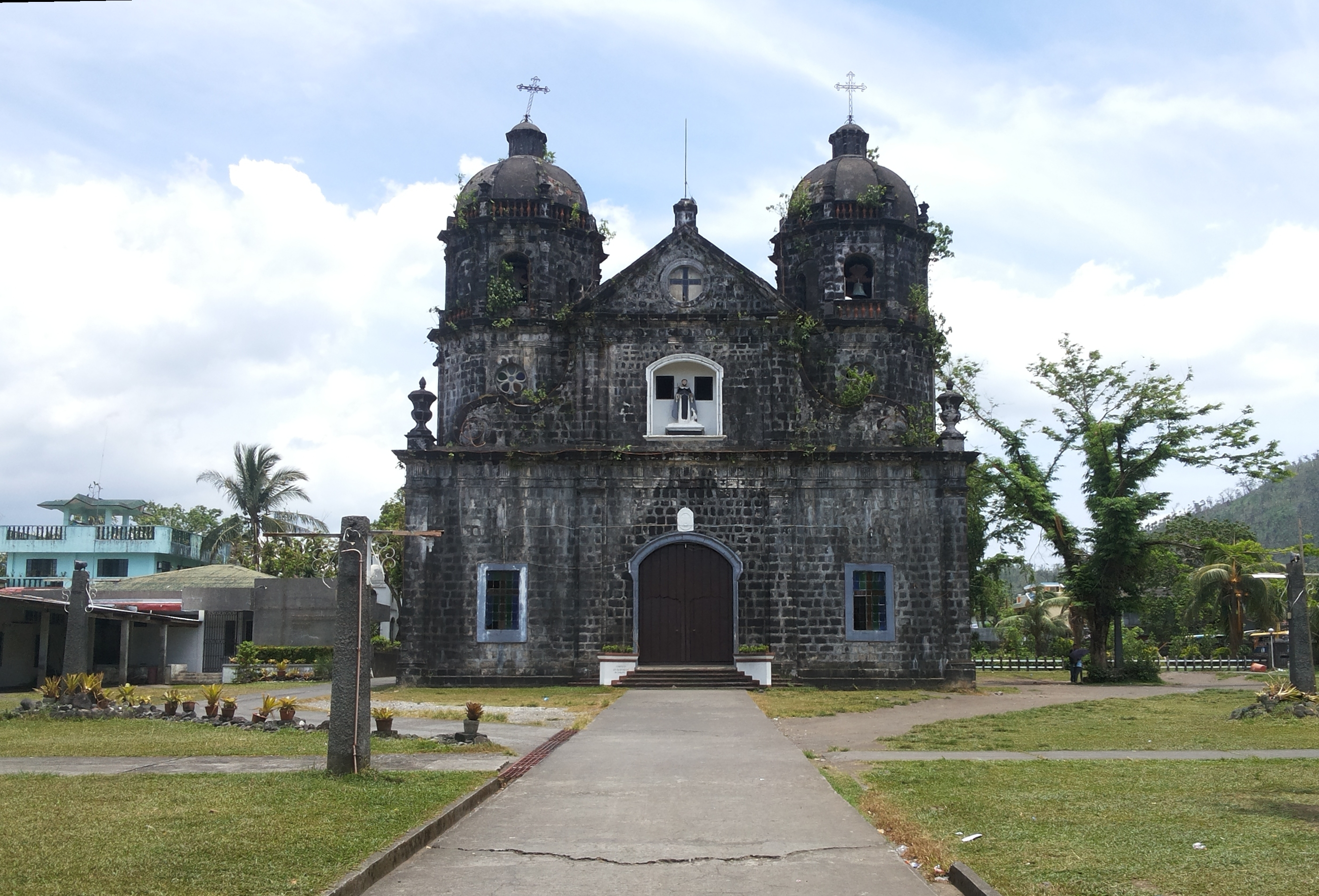
- Santo Domingo Church

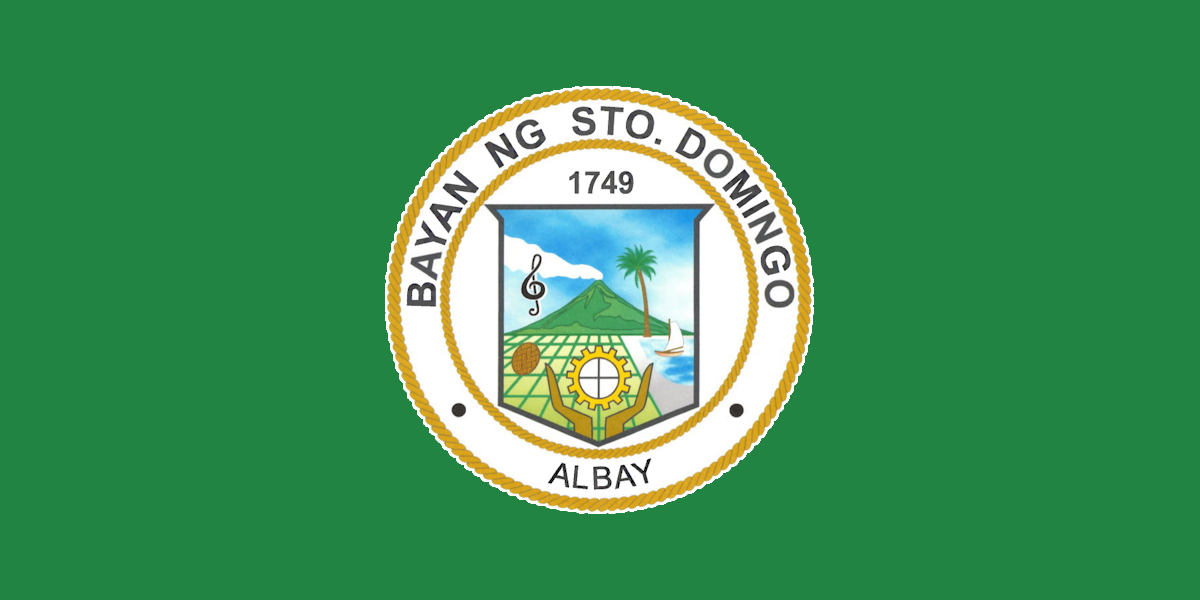
- Flag

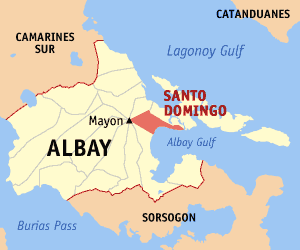
- Map of Albay with Santo Domingo highlighted
- Interactive map of Santo Domingo
- Location within the Philippines
- Coordinates: 13°14′06″N 123°46′37″E
- Country: Philippines
- Region: Bicol Region
- Province: Albay
- District: 1st district
- Named for: Saint Dominic
- Barangays: 23 (see Barangays)

Government
  - Type: Sangguniang Bayan
  - Mayor: Nomar V. Banda
  - Vice Mayor: Mark B. Aguas
  - Representative: Krisel Lagman-Luistro
  - Municipal Council: Members: Raquel Balasta-Sto. Tomas; Carlo B. Baloloy; Marvin B. Baloloy; Jerry B. Bañega (ex officio); Patrick Glen L. Chan; Paul Clinton L. Chan; Lyra B. Gregorio; Krazel B. Mandane (ex officio); Jose B. Maristela; Dino Jose S. Surtida
  - Electorate: 27,856 voters (2025)

Area
  - Total: 51.22 km^{2} (19.78 sq mi)
- Elevation: 89 m (292 ft)
- Highest elevation: 440 m (1,440 ft)
- Lowest elevation: 0 m (0 ft)

Population (2024 census)
  - Total: 37,586
  - Density: 733.8/km^{2} (1,901/sq mi)
  - Households: 8,819
- Demonym: Sto. Domingueño Libognon

Economy
  - Income class: 2nd municipal income class
  - Poverty incidence: 20.74% (2023)
  - Revenue: ₱ 179.8 million (2024)
  - Assets: ₱ 743.2 million (2024)
  - Expenditure: ₱ 140 million (2024)
  - Liabilities: ₱ 431.4 million (2024)

Service provider
  - Electricity: Albay Electric Cooperative (ALECO)
- Time zone: UTC+8 (PST)
- ZIP code: 4508
- PSGC: 0500516000
- IDD : area code: +63 (0)52
- Native languages: Bikol Central; Tagalog
- Feast date: October 5–6
- Catholic diocese: Diocese of Legazpi
- Patron saint: St. Dominic of Guzman
- Website: www.stodomingo-albay.gov.ph

Santo Domingo, officially the Municipality of Santo Domingo, (Central Bikol: Banwaan kan Santo Domingo; Tagalog: Bayan ng Santo Domingo), is a municipality in the province of Albay, Philippines. According to the 2024 census, it has a population of 37,586 people.

== History ==
Santo Domingo was a former barrio of Ibalon, then the Municipality of Albay, now Legazpi City. It became a separate Municipality in 1749 through the uproar of its inhabitants and under the leadership of Diego Castellanos who took the matter first to the authorities in Manila, and to the Bishop of Ambos Camarines. But it was not until 1785, 36 years after its establishment as a town that a church was built. In those days, it was only church building that represented the town. The first church was made of wood and basag (bamboo split). Here, the statue of the patron saint Santo Domingo (Saint Dominic de Guzman), whose feast is observed every August 4, was placed. When the church was burned in 1882, the Spanish priests built a new one; the present artistic church with piedras ladradas chiseled balustrades and twin domes.

The town of Santo Domingo was originally named Libog. Albay historians say that there were a number of stories on the origin of the name Libog. One version is that libog was derived from the Bikol word labog meaning "unclear water" for there was a time when no potable water was available in the locality. Another has it that the town might have been called after labog (jellyfish), which abound in its coastal water. Libod (behind) is another version because the town's position is behind the straight road from Legazpi to Tabaco across Basud to Santa Misericordia.

Still another version is the corrupted form of the word libot which means "round about" or "winding way". In the early days of Spanish invasion, there were two routes passing through this place to Tabaco: one trail was straight or a short cut and the other was a round about (libot) way passing through the center of the town (via Poblacion). Later when the time came to classify and arrange this settlement to give it a political status as a visita of Binanuahan, now Legazpi Port, the corruption crept in – Libog for Libot. Hence, this town was named El Pueblo de Liboug, by the Spanish conquerors.

In 1816, one hundred fifty-nine (159) Moro pirates and six (6) vintas attacked the town, taking them one captive, Juan de la Conception, who was able to return after 30 years. The attack prompted the people to construct watchtowers and walls along the shores, which served as their shelter from attacks. Ruins of the walls can still be found.

In the year 1832, the town received its pioneer Filipino priest, father Martin Martinez. The same year, the Presidencia Municipal was completed under Captain Teodoro Felebrico. This building was ruined and rehabilitated into a public school building in 1918.

On 21 June 1959, Libog was renamed into Santo Domingo, through Republic Act 2520.

== Geography ==
Santo Domingo is located at 13°14′06″N 123°46′37″E.

According to the Philippine Statistics Authority, the municipality has a land area of 51.22 square kilometres (19.78 sq mi) constituting 1.99% of the 2,575.77-square-kilometre- (994.51 sq mi) total area of Albay. Santo Domingo is 12 kilometres (7.5 mi) from Legazpi City and 539 kilometres (335 mi) from Manila.

=== Barangays ===
Santo Domingo is politically subdivided into 23 barangays. Each barangay consists of puroks and some have sitios.

PSGC	Barangay	Population			±% p.a.	
		2024		2010		
050516001	Alimsog	2.9%	1,082	963	▴	0.81%
050516006	Bagong San Roque	3.8%	1,410	1,332	▴	0.39%
050516002	Buhatan	3.2%	1,215	1,245	▾	−0.17%
050516003	Calayucay	4.4%	1,663	1,595	▴	0.29%
050516013	Del Rosario Poblacion (Barangay 3)	1.9%	730	709	▴	0.20%
050516004	Fidel Surtida	7.4%	2,780	2,206	▴	1.60%
050516005	Lidong	8.2%	3,076	2,838	▴	0.56%
050516025	Market Site Poblacion (Barangay 9)	0.5%	200	208	▾	−0.27%
050516017	Nagsiya Poblacion (Barangay 8)	2.6%	995	975	▴	0.14%
050516026	Pandayan Poblacion (Barangay 10)	1.3%	493	510	▾	−0.23%
050516018	Salvacion	5.2%	1,946	1,804	▴	0.52%
050516019	San Andres	8.7%	3,280	2,756	▴	1.21%
050516020	San Fernando	5.8%	2,193	2,049	▴	0.47%
050516015	San Francisco Poblacion (Barangay 1)	1.7%	654	628	▴	0.28%
050516021	San Isidro	7.6%	2,843	2,604	▴	0.61%
050516008	San Juan Poblacion (Barangay 2)	2.9%	1,072	1,174	▾	−0.62%
050516010	San Pedro Poblacion (Barangay 5)	1.3%	471	508	▾	−0.52%
050516012	San Rafael Poblacion (Barangay 7)	1.6%	615	651	▾	−0.39%
050516022	San Roque	4.4%	1,636	1,435	▴	0.91%
050516011	San Vicente Poblacion (Barangay 6)	3.6%	1,356	1,238	▴	0.63%
050516023	Santa Misericordia	7.2%	2,714	2,536	▴	0.47%
050516009	Santo Domingo Poblacion (Barangay 4)	1.8%	673	707	▾	−0.34%
050516024	Santo Niño	5.0%	1,870	1,743	▴	0.49%
	Total		37,586	32,414	▴	1.02%

=== Climate ===
Climate data for Santo Domingo, Albay
Month	Jan	Feb	Mar	Apr	May	Jun	Jul	Aug	Sep	Oct	Nov	Dec	Year
Mean daily maximum °C (°F)	27 (81)	27 (81)	28 (82)	30 (86)	31 (88)	30 (86)	29 (84)	29 (84)	29 (84)	29 (84)	28 (82)	27 (81)	29 (84)
Mean daily minimum °C (°F)	22 (72)	22 (72)	23 (73)	24 (75)	25 (77)	25 (77)	25 (77)	25 (77)	25 (77)	24 (75)	24 (75)	23 (73)	24 (75)
Average precipitation mm (inches)	138 (5.4)	83 (3.3)	74 (2.9)	50 (2.0)	108 (4.3)	165 (6.5)	202 (8.0)	165 (6.5)	190 (7.5)	186 (7.3)	188 (7.4)	183 (7.2)	1,732 (68.3)
Average rainy days	16.8	11.9	13.5	13.8	20.5	25.2	27.4	26.2	26.1	24.7	20.7	18.5	245.3
Source: Meteoblue

== Demographics ==
Population census of Santo Domingo
Year	Pop.	±% p.a.
1903	5,492	—
1918	7,391	+2.00%
1939	7,809	+0.26%
1948	9,493	+2.19%
1960	10,951	+1.20%
1970	15,392	+3.46%
1975	17,562	+2.68%
1980	19,764	+2.39%
1990	22,939	+1.50%
1995	25,586	+2.07%
2000	27,392	+1.47%
2007	30,711	+1.59%
2010	32,414	+1.98%
2015	34,967	+1.45%
2020	37,765	+1.63%
2024	37,586	−0.11%
Source: Philippine Statistics Authority

In the 2024 census, Santo Domingo had a population of 37,586 people. The population density was 730 inhabitants per square kilometre (1,900/sq mi).

== Economy ==
Poverty incidence of Santo Domingo (%)

Source: Philippine Statistics Authority

== Tourism ==
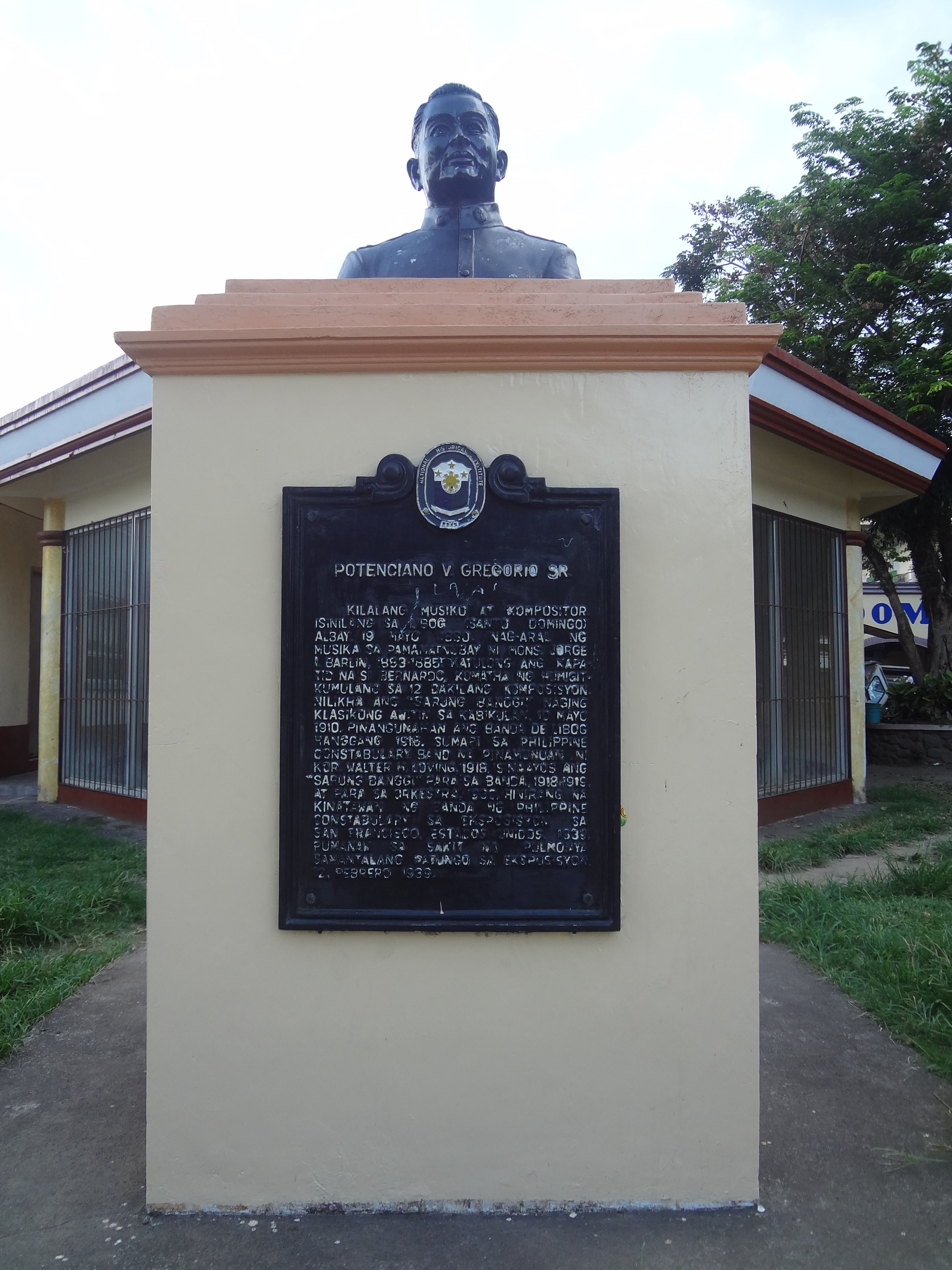
Monument of Potenciano Gregorio

Potenciano Gregorio, Sr., a famous Bicolano composer and musician was born in the town on May 19, 1880. A shrine where his remains are kept is located in the Town Plaza.

Sarung Banggi Festival, an eight-day summer festivity immortalizing Potenciano Gregorio, Sr.'s timeless composition is held here annually in the month of May.

Resorts along the Santo Domingo coastline offer a view of the black beach, Albay Gulf and a part of the Legazpi City area. Some resorts offer entertainment facilities like videoke and billiards. Some have private pools.

Spanish galleon wreck site which serves as a strong reminder of the rich Manila to Acapulco (Mexico) trade routes during the Spanish era. Found along the shores of Buhatan beach at Santo Domingo, this galleon relic was wrought by a strong typhoon on its way to Acapulco and crushed on the reefs of Albay Gulf. This historical remains lie at five fathoms (9 m) under the sea. It is an ideal place for scuba diving, fishing or boating.

== Education ==
The Santo Domingo Schools District Office governs all educational institutions within the municipality. It oversees the management and operations of all private and public, from primary to secondary schools.

=== Primary and elementary schools ===
- Bagong San Roque Elementary School
- Buhatan Elementary School
- Calayucay Elementary School
- CDLC Smart Kids Learning School
- Early Age Learning Center
- Fidel Surtida Elementary School
- Lidong Elementary School
- Salvacion Elementary School
- San Andres Elementary School
- San Fernando Elementary School
- San Isidro Elementary School
- Shannan Christian Academy
- Sta. Misericordia Elementary School
- Sto. Domingo Central School

=== Secondary schools ===
- Alimsog Integrated School
- Bical High School
- San Fernando National High School
- Sto. Domingo National High School
