= Albay's at-large congressional district =

Legislative district of the Philippines

Albay's at-large congressional district may refer to three occasions when a provincewide at-large district was used for elections to the various Philippine national legislatures from Albay.

From 1898 to 1901, five representatives from the province who were elected at-large sat in the Malolos Congress, the National Assembly of the First Philippine Republic. Albay was reorganized under the Insular Government of the Philippine Islands in 1901 with Catanduanes annexed to it and was divided into three districts for the Philippine Assembly in 1907. From 1943 to 1944, the province as a whole sent two representatives to the National Assembly of the Second Philippine Republic. Multiple district representation was restored in the province in 1945. In 1978, regional at-large assembly districts were created for the national parliament with Albay included in the 12-seat Region V's at-large district. The province returned to its own single multi-member at-large district in 1984 with a three-seat delegation for the Regular Batasang Pambansa of the Fourth Philippine Republic.

After 1986, Albay elected its representatives from its congressional districts.

== Representation history ==
#	Term of office		National Assembly	Seat A				Seat B				Seat C				Seat D				Seat E			
#	Start	End	National Assembly	Image	Member	Party	Electoral history	Image	Member	Party	Electoral history	Image	Member	Party	Electoral history	Image	Member	Party	Electoral history	Image	Member	Party	Electoral history
=== Albay's at-large district for the Malolos Congress ===
District created June 18, 1898.
–	September 15, 1898	March 23, 1901	1st		Marcial Calleja	Independent	Elected in 1898.		Salvador V. del Rosario	Independent	Elected in 1898.		Honorato Agrava	Independent	Appointed.		Pantaleón García	Independent	Appointed.		Aguedo Velarde	Independent	Appointed.
#	Term of office		National Assembly	Seat A				Seat B															
#	Start	End	National Assembly	Image	Member	Party	Electoral history	Image	Member	Party	Electoral history												
=== Albay's at-large district for the National Assembly (Second Philippine Republic) ===
District re-created September 7, 1943.
–	September 25, 1943	February 2, 1944	1st		Pío Durán	KALIBAPI	Elected in 1943.		Julián L. Locsín Jr.	KALIBAPI	Appointed as an ex officio member.												
#	Term of office		Batasang Pambansa	Seat A				Seat B				Seat C											
#	Start	End	Batasang Pambansa	Image	Member	Party	Electoral history	Image	Member	Party	Electoral history	Image	Member	Party	Electoral history								
=== Albay's at-large district for the Regular Batasang Pambansa ===
District re-created February 1, 1984.
–	July 23, 1984	March 25, 1986	2nd		Pedro Marcellana Jr.	UNIDO	Elected in 1984.		Peter A. Sabido	KBL	Elected in 1984.		Victor Ziga	UNIDO	Elected in 1984.								

== See also ==
- Legislative districts of Albay
