= Malinao, Albay =

Municipality in Albay, Philippines

Malinao
- Municipality
- Municipality of Malinao
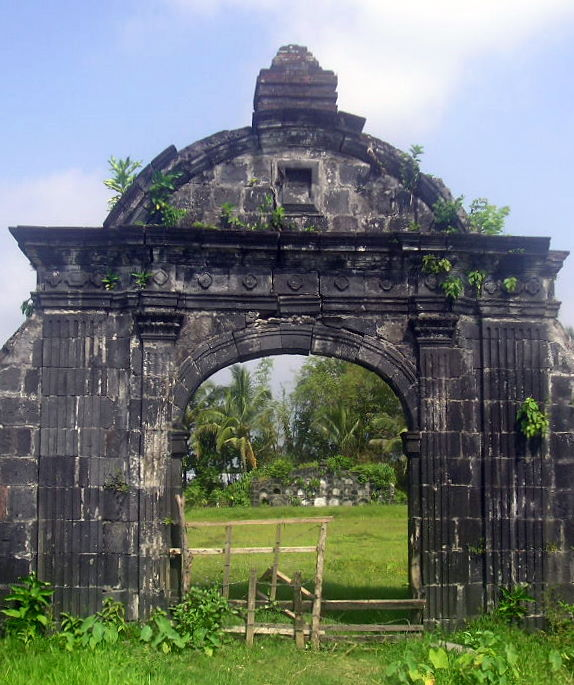
- Spanish-era cemetery of Malinao

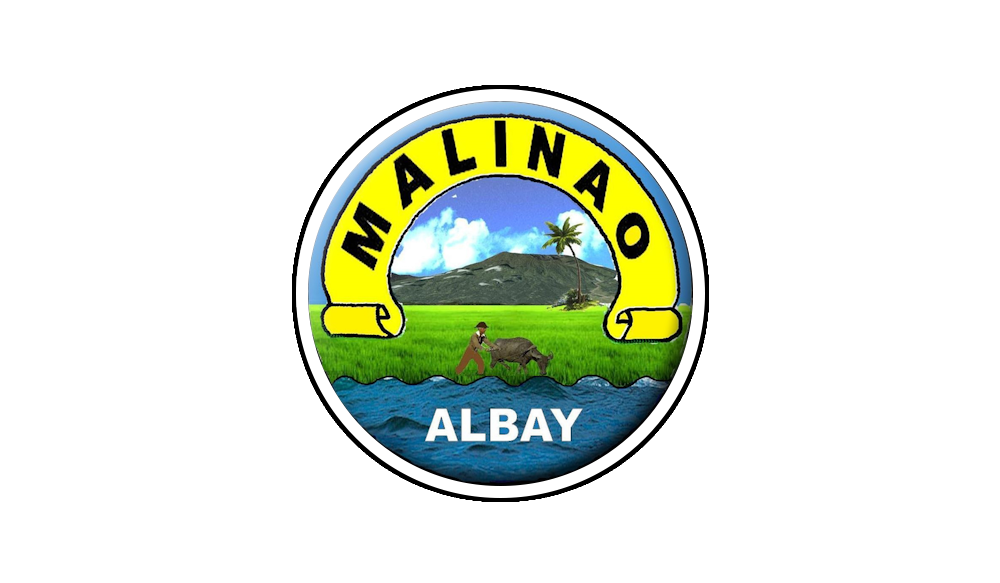
- Flag
- Nickname: The Wonderland of Albay
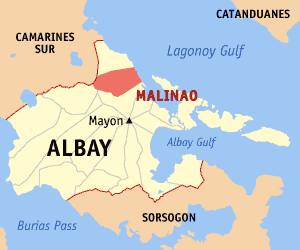
- Map of Albay with Malinao highlighted
- Interactive map of Malinao
- Location within the Philippines
- Coordinates: 13°24′N 123°42′E
- Country: Philippines
- Region: Bicol Region
- Province: Albay
- District: 1st district
- Barangays: 29 (see Barangays)

Government
  - Type: Sangguniang Bayan
  - Mayor: Sheryl C. Bilo
  - Vice Mayor: Abner E. Cargullo
  - Representative: Edcel C. Lagman
  - Municipal Council: Members: Norlito C. Cas; Djoanna V. Luyun; Reymond Mahinay; Belen Cellona; Irene M. Fajut; Joel C. Ceriola; Ernalyn Ceriola; Victorino M. Aperin
  - Electorate: 34,775 voters (2025)

Area
  - Total: 107.50 km^{2} (41.51 sq mi)
- Elevation: 24 m (79 ft)
- Highest elevation: 274 m (899 ft)
- Lowest elevation: 0 m (0 ft)

Population (2024 census)
  - Total: 49,570
  - Density: 461.1/km^{2} (1,194/sq mi)
  - Households: 10,928
- Demonym: Malinaonon

Economy
  - Income class: 2nd municipal income class
  - Poverty incidence: 33.06% (2023)
  - Revenue: ₱ 189.9 million (2024)
  - Assets: ₱ 957.3 million (2024)
  - Expenditure: ₱ 90.41 million (2024)
  - Liabilities: ₱ 132 million (2024)

Service provider
  - Electricity: Albay Electric Cooperative (ALECO)
- Time zone: UTC+8 (PST)
- ZIP code 4512: 4514
- PSGC: 0500510000
- IDD : area code: +63 (0)52
- Native languages: Central Bikol; Tagalog
- Catholic diocese: Diocese of Legazpi
- Website: www.malinao.gov.ph

Malinao, officially the Municipality of Malinao (Central Bikol: Banwaan kan Malinao; Tagalog: Bayan ng Malinao), is a municipality in the province of Albay, Philippines. According to the 2024 census, it has a population of 49,570 people.

It is a scenic town in the province, known for its rich culture and natural beauty. Surrounded by green landscapes, it is home to skilled artisans known for weaving and pottery. These crafts serve as both livelihood and heritage, reflected in the town’s lively markets and artisan workshops.

== History ==
Malinao was founded in 1600 during the Spanish colonial period.

Between 1600 and 1616, Malinao was then part of the Diocese of Cagsawa (now Daraga). It became an independent bisita or sitio attached to Sawangan (now Legazpi City) until 1619, when separate religious administration was exercised with Rev. Francisco de Santa Ana, OFM, as first pastor.

Local folklore speaks of a plant once rich in this town called "Alinao." The prefix "ma", which denotes abundance of something in local language, was affixed by the natives in referring to the place abundant with Alinao, thus Ma-alinao and later corrupted to Malinao. The 1818 census showed 2,841 native families paying tribute and they were coexisting with 241 Spanish-Filipino families.

It was in 1916 when, according to legendary account, Malinao got its name. A siege by Moros on the town resulted in the abduction of seven women. Miraculously, the boat sank within the jurisdictional waters of Malinao and on that same spot in the sea across the island of Natunawan because of the women's fervent prayer in canticles and "Tarahades" or clear thoughts for the Blessed Virgin to sink the boat. From these "clear thoughts" of the seven women translated in Bikol language as "Malinao na isip".

The name of Malinao was given to the municipality. It has since then the tradition among the residents, particularly the women, to sing the canticles or tarahades in times of crisis, calamities, or when they want to drive away epidemics and misfortunes.

== Geography ==
According to the Philippine Statistics Authority, the municipality has a land area of 107.50 square kilometres (41.51 sq mi) constituting 4.17% of the 2,575.77-square-kilometre- (994.51 sq mi) total area of Albay.

Malinao occupies a narrow stretch of plains hemmed in by Lagonoy Gulf in the east and Mount Malinao on the west. The area is dominated by the mountain ranges of Malinao, with a peak altitude of 1,584 metres (5,197 ft) above sea level. It is 30 kilometres (19 mi) from Legazpi and 557 kilometres (346 mi) southeast of Manila.

=== Barangays ===
Malinao is politically subdivided into 29 barangays. Each barangay consists of puroks and some have sitios.

Of these, 12 are upland barangays, 13 lowland barangays, and 4 are coastal barangays. Twenty-five barangays are rural areas and the remaining four are urban.

PSGC	Barangay	Population			±% p.a.	
		2024		2010		
050510001	Awang	0.7%	347	336	▴	0.22%
050510002	Bagatangki	1.6%	772	569	▴	2.14%
050510022	Bagumbayan	1.6%	788	699	▴	0.84%
050510003	Balading	6.3%	3,104	2,996	▴	0.25%
050510004	Balza	4.2%	2,084	2,061	▴	0.08%
050510005	Bariw	3.1%	1,524	1,353	▴	0.83%
050510006	Baybay	3.5%	1,730	1,647	▴	0.34%
050510007	Bulang	2.1%	1,028	864	▴	1.21%
050510008	Burabod	1.7%	837	836	▴	0.01%
050510009	Cabunturan	1.2%	577	681	▾	−1.14%
050510010	Comun	3.6%	1,772	1,672	▴	0.40%
050510011	Diaro	1.8%	889	885	▴	0.03%
050510012	Estancia	8.7%	4,293	3,987	▴	0.51%
050510013	Jonop	4.1%	2,024	2,009	▴	0.05%
050510014	Labnig	7.0%	3,479	3,410	▴	0.14%
050510015	Libod	2.1%	1,065	949	▴	0.80%
050510016	Malolos	1.7%	856	785	▴	0.60%
050510017	Matalipni	3.9%	1,939	1,863	▴	0.28%
050510018	Ogob	4.0%	1,992	1,975	▴	0.06%
050510019	Pawa	2.5%	1,217	1,103	▴	0.69%
050510020	Payahan	2.9%	1,414	1,390	▴	0.12%
050510021	Poblacion	1.3%	657	570	▴	0.99%
050510023	Quinarabasahan	1.7%	821	735	▴	0.77%
050510024	Santa Elena	2.3%	1,133	1,018	▴	0.75%
050510025	Soa	2.7%	1,352	1,248	▴	0.56%
050510026	Sugcad	3.6%	1,784	1,615	▴	0.69%
050510027	Tagoytoy	4.7%	2,323	2,217	▴	0.32%
050510028	Tanawan	3.5%	1,739	1,638	▴	0.42%
050510029	Tuliw	3.6%	1,761	1,659	▴	0.42%
	Total		49,570	42,770	▴	1.03%

=== Climate ===
Climate data for Malinao, Albay
Month	Jan	Feb	Mar	Apr	May	Jun	Jul	Aug	Sep	Oct	Nov	Dec	Year
Mean daily maximum °C (°F)	27 (81)	27 (81)	28 (82)	30 (86)	31 (88)	30 (86)	29 (84)	29 (84)	29 (84)	29 (84)	28 (82)	27 (81)	29 (84)
Mean daily minimum °C (°F)	22 (72)	22 (72)	23 (73)	24 (75)	25 (77)	25 (77)	25 (77)	25 (77)	25 (77)	24 (75)	24 (75)	23 (73)	24 (75)
Average precipitation mm (inches)	138 (5.4)	83 (3.3)	74 (2.9)	50 (2.0)	108 (4.3)	165 (6.5)	202 (8.0)	165 (6.5)	190 (7.5)	186 (7.3)	188 (7.4)	183 (7.2)	1,732 (68.3)
Average rainy days	16.8	11.9	13.5	13.8	20.5	25.2	27.4	26.2	26.1	24.7	20.7	18.5	245.3
Source: Meteoblue

== Demographics ==
Population census of Malinao
Year	Pop.	±% p.a.
1903	12,437	—
1918	13,539	+0.57%
1939	15,089	+0.52%
1948	15,176	+0.06%
1960	16,926	+0.91%
1970	22,978	+3.10%
1975	24,889	+1.62%
1980	28,372	+2.65%
1990	31,349	+1.00%
1995	33,872	+1.46%
2000	36,231	+1.45%
2007	39,516	+1.20%
2010	42,770	+2.92%
2015	45,301	+1.10%
2020	47,395	+0.96%
2024	49,570	+1.08%
Source: Philippine Statistics Authority

In the 2024 census, Malinao had a population of 49,570 people. The population density was 460 inhabitants per square kilometre (1,200/sq mi).

In 1995, The total population was 33,872, which increased by 2359 individuals or 6.94% for five (5) years in 2000. In the 2010 census, the population had reached 42,770.

Of these, less than ten (10) percent or 3,301 reside in the urban barangays of Bagumbayan, Pawa, Payahan, and Poblacion. The rest of the constituents meanwhile stay on the rural barangays: Awang, Bagatangki, Balading, Balza, Bariw, Baybay, Bulang, Burabod, Cabunturan, Comun, Diaro, Estancia, Jonop, Labnig, Libod, Malolos, matalipni, Ogob, Quinarabasahan, Santa Elena, Soa, Sugcad, Tagoytoy, Tanawan, and Tuliw. The densest areas are Estancia, Labnig, and Balading while Awang and Bagatangki are the least populated in the rural areas.

The majority of its population is engaged in agriculture and other agri-related enterprise.

== Economy ==
Poverty incidence of Malinao (%)

Source: Philippine Statistics Authority

== Education ==
The Malinao Schools District Office governs all educational institutions within the municipality. It oversees the management and operations of all private and public, from primary to secondary schools.

=== Primary and elementary schools ===
- Awang Elementary School
- Bagatangki Elementary School
- Balading Elementary School
- Balza Elementary School
- Bariw Elementary School
- Baybay Elementary School
- Bulang Elementary School
- Burabod Elementary School
- Comun Elementary School
- Diaro Elementary School
- Estancia Elementary School
- Jonop Elementary School
- Labnig Elementary School
- Libod Elementary School
- Malinao Central School
- Malolos Elementary School
- Matalipni Elementary School
- Ogob Elementary School
- Quinarabasahan Elementary School
- Soa Elementary School
- Sta. Elena Elementary School
- Sugcad Elementary School
- Tagoytoy Elementary School
- Tanawan Elementary School
- Tuliw Elementary School

=== Secondary schools ===
- Estancia National High School
- Labnig National High School
- Malinao National High School
