= Samuel Kneeland =

Samuel Kneeland may refer to:

- Samuel Kneeland (printer) (1696–1769), Boston printer and publisher
- Samuel Kneeland (naturalist) (1821–1888), naturalist of the United States
