= Mayon =

Stratovolcano in Luzon, Philippines

- Mayon Volcano; Mount Mayon; Bulkan Mayon (Central Bikol)
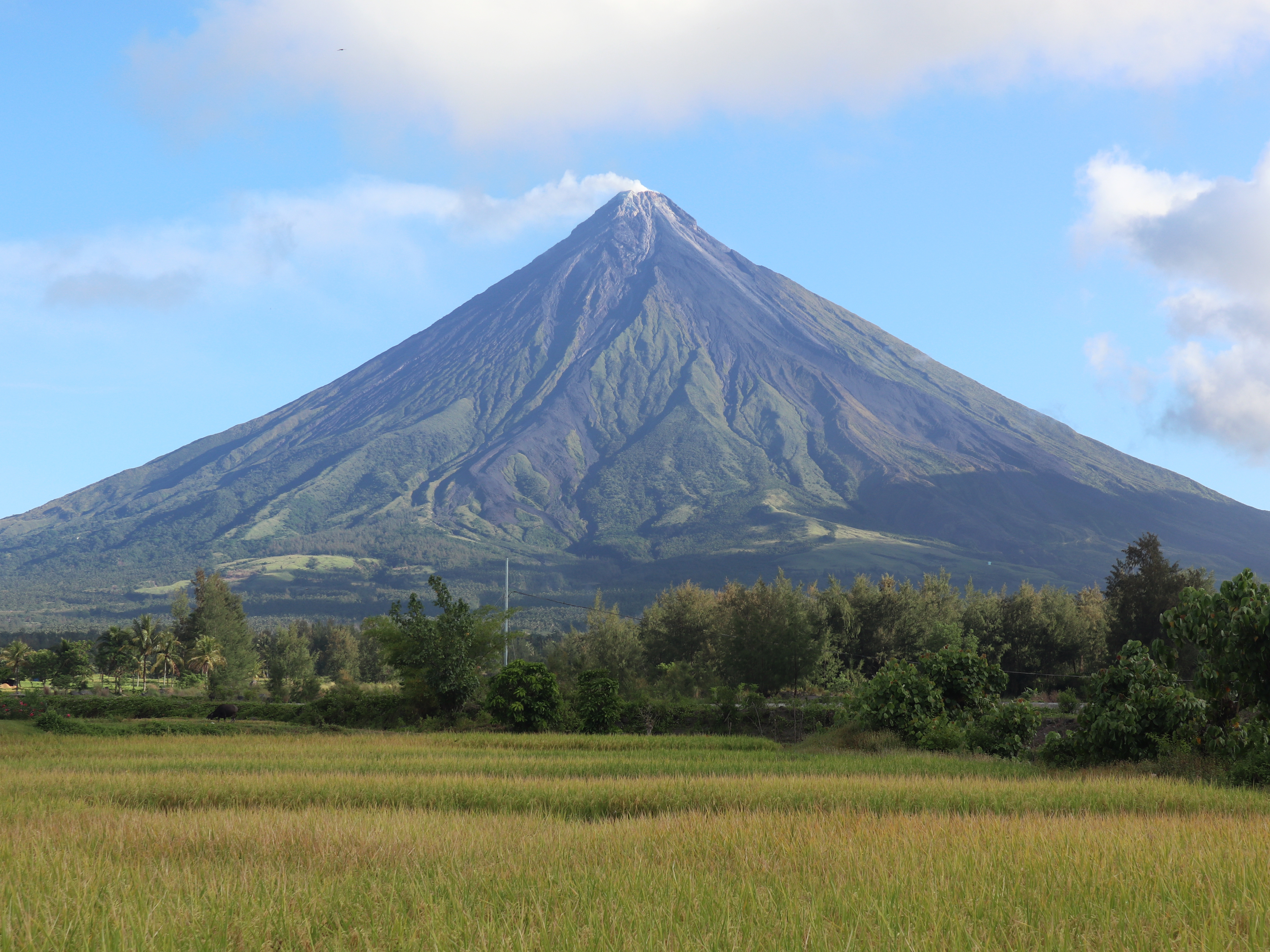
- Mayon Volcano as seen from Daraga, Albay

Highest point
- Elevation: 2,463 m (8,081 ft)
- Prominence: 2,447 m (8,028 ft)
- Listing: Philippines highest peaks; 28th; Philippines ultra peaks 5th; Ribu; Bicol highest point; Active volcano
- Coordinates: 13°15′24″N 123°41′06″E

Geography
- Location within Albay Location within Luzon Location within Philippines
- Mayon (large red marker) with inactive cinder cones mentioned in text (small brown markers)
- Country: Philippines
- Region: Bicol Region
- Province: Albay
- Cities and municipalities: List: Camalig; Daraga; Guinobatan; Legazpi; Ligao; Malilipot; Santo Domingo; Tabaco

Geology
- Rock age: > 20,000 years
- Mountain type: Stratovolcano
- Volcanic arc: Bicol Volcanic Arc
- Last eruption: January 6, 2026 (ongoing)

Climbing
- First ascent: Scotsmen Paton & Stewart (1858)

Mayon (Central Bikol: Bulkan Mayon; Tagalog: Bulkang Mayon, IPA: [mɐˈjɔn]), also known as Mount Mayon and Mayon Volcano, is an active stratovolcano in the province of Albay in Bicol, Philippines. A popular tourist destination, it is renowned for its "perfect cone" owing to its symmetric conical shape, and is regarded as sacred in Philippine mythology.

The volcano with its surrounding landscape was declared a national park on July 20, 1938, the first in the nation. It was reclassified as a natural park and renamed the Mayon Volcano Natural Park in 2000. It is the centerpiece of the Albay Biosphere Reserve as declared by UNESCO in 2016, and is currently being nominated as a World Heritage Site.

Mayon is the most active volcano in the Philippines, and its activity is regularly monitored by the Philippine Institute of Volcanology and Seismology (PHIVOLCS) from their provincial headquarters on Ligñon Hill, about 12 km (7.5 mi) from the summit.

== Geography ==
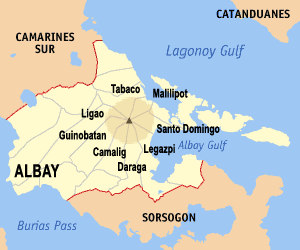
Mayon is shared by three cities and five municipalities of Albay province.

Mayon is the main landmark and highest point of the province of Albay and the whole Bicol Region in the Philippines, rising 2,463 m (8,081 ft) from the shores of Albay Gulf about 10 km (6.2 mi) away. The volcano is geographically shared by the eight cities and municipalities of Legazpi, Daraga, Camalig, Guinobatan, Ligao, Tabaco, Malilipot, and Santo Domingo (clockwise from Legazpi), which divide the cone like slices of a pie when viewing a map of their political boundaries. A number of cinder cones surround the volcano, for example Ligñon Hill to the south east and Paulog Cinder Cone to the west.

== Geology ==
Mayon is a classic stratovolcano with a small central summit crater. It is one of the world's most symmetrical volcanic cones.

The concave profile, a hyperbolic sine curve of the volcano is due to the balance between erosion and eruption, defined by the angle of repose of ash. The steepest upper slopes of the volcano reach an average slope gradient of 75%, while the lower foot slope is only an average of 3%. The volcanic crater is about 250 m (820 ft) in diameter. At least 85 lava flows have been identified, and consist mainly of lava augite-hypersthene-andesite, generally fed from the crater. Pyroclastic flows, characterized as a St. Vincent nuee' ardente, leave behind block and ash deposits, and breadcrust bombs in an ash and lapilli matrix. The farthest flow reached 8.5 km (5.3 mi) along Fidel Surtida, Santo Domingo. Mayon lahars were formed by rainstorms during eruptions, or by torrential rain afterwards. Averaging 230 m (750 ft) in height and 710 m (2,330 ft) in diameter, 7 cinder cones are found on the southern and southwestern lower slopes. Composed of olivine-augite basalt, these cones have an angle of repose of 34%, with Ligñon Hill and Paulog Cinder Cone having been sampled.

Like other volcanoes around the Pacific Ocean, Mayon is a part of the Pacific Ring of Fire. It is on the southeast side of Luzon. The Bicol Arc is one of 7 oceanic trench subduction zones defining the Philippine Mobile Belt. Volcanism in the Bicol Arc is related to the westward subduction of the Philippine Plate along the Philippine Trench. The 12 active and inactive volcanoes within the arc include the Mayon Volcano, Mount Bulusan, Mount Isarog, Mount Iriga, Malinao Volcano, and Mount Masaraga. In general, these are calc-alkali basalts, basaltic andesites, and andesites. Samples from Ligñon Hill and Paulog Cinder Cone are basalt or tachybasalt, with one basaltic trachyandesite and while the main edithice is mainly basaltic andesite, samples of the stratovolcano's eruptives cover most of the sodium potassium oxide composition range of andesite basalts including trachydacite, but not trachyte.

== Ecology ==
In August 2021, soils from Mayon have been found containing bacterial species with potential antibiotic and anti-cancer properties. Whole-genome sequencing subsequently confirmed a novel species within Streptomyces and studies showed activity against the human pathogens Salmonella enterica, Klebsiella pneumoniae, Staphylococcus aureus, Candida albicans, Aspergillus niger and Fusarium, as well as inhibiting HCT116 cells from a human colorectal cancer cell line.

Japanese studies have suggested that the extremely thermophilic Calditerricola bacteria is found in volcanic ash samples from both Mayon and Mount Sakurajima in Japan.

== Recorded eruptions ==
Mayon is the most active volcano in the Philippines, erupting over 52 times in the past 500 years. Historical observations accounted its first eruption in 1616. The first eruption for which an extended account exists was the six-day event of July 20, 1766. The earliest eruption dated by radiocarbon methods was in 3100 BCE ± 300 years.

=== 1814 eruption ===
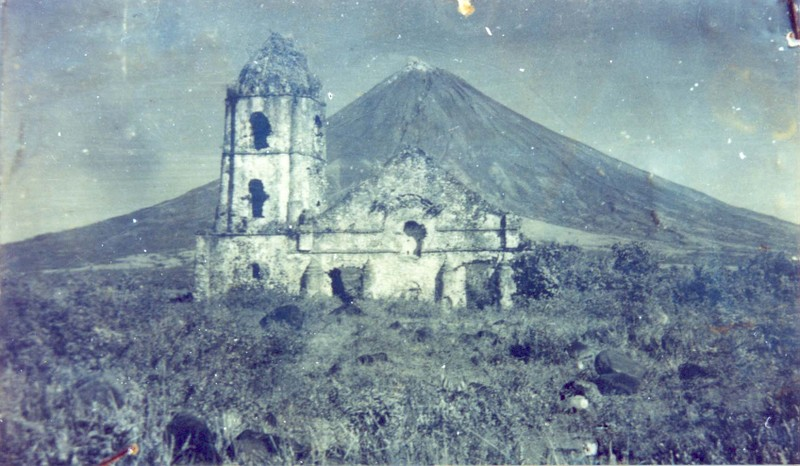
An old photograph of the Cagsawa ruins in February 1, 1814 with the façade still standing. The church was largely destroyed during the 1814 eruption of Mayon. Only the bell tower exists today, the façade having been demolished in the 1960's or 1970's due to structural integrity concerns.

Its most destructive recorded eruption occurred on February 1, 1814 (VEI=4). Lava flowed but less than the 1766 eruption. The volcano belched dark ash and eventually bombarded the town of Cagsawa with tephra that buried it. Trees burned, and rivers were certainly damaged. Proximate areas were also devastated by the eruption, with ash accumulating to 9 m (30 ft) in depth. In Cagsawa town, about 1,200 locals perished in what is considered to be the most lethal eruption in Mayon's history according to PHIVOLCS. The 1814 eruption is believed to have contributed to the accumulation of atmospheric ash together with the catastrophic 1815 eruption of other volcanoes like Indonesia's Mount Tambora, leading to the Year Without a Summer in 1816.

=== 1881–1882 eruption ===
From July 6, 1881, until approximately August 1882, Mayon underwent a strong (VEI=3) eruption. Samuel Kneeland, a naturalist, professor and geologist, personally observed the volcanic activity on Christmas Day, 1881, about five months after the start of the activity:

At the date of my visit, the volcano had poured out, for five months continuously, a stream of lava on the Legaspi side from the very summit. The viscid mass bubbled quietly but grandly, and overran the border of the crater, descending several hundred feet in a glowing wave, like red-hot iron. Gradually, fading as the upper surface cooled, it changed to a thousand sparkling rills among the crevices, and, as it passed beyond the line of complete vision behind the woods near the base, the fires twinkled like stars or the scintillations of a dying conflagration. More than half of the mountain height was thus illuminated.

=== 1897 eruption ===
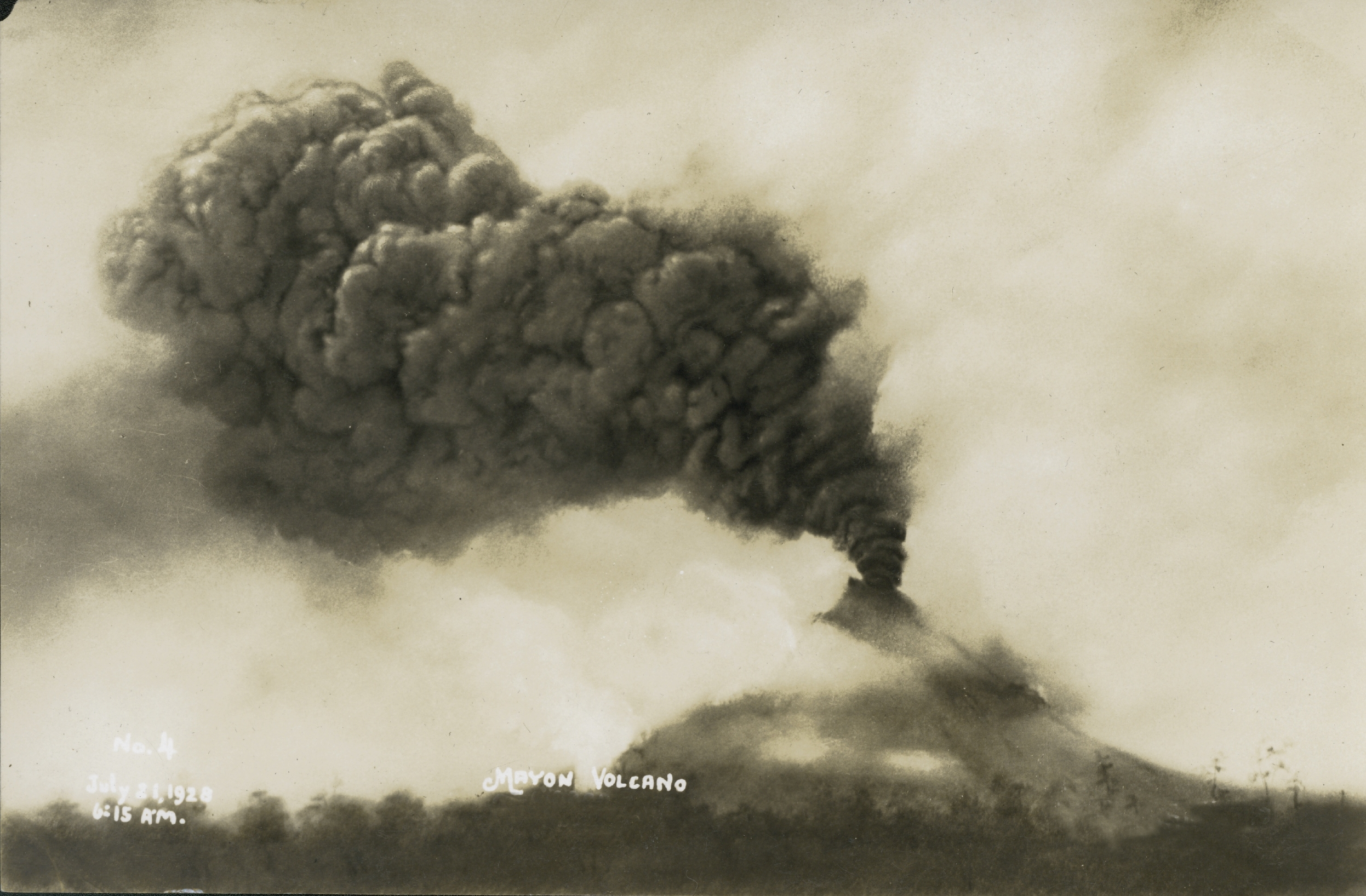
Mount Mayon erupting on July 21, 1928

Mayon's longest uninterrupted eruption occurred on June 23, 1897 (VEI=4), and lasted for seven days. Lava once again flowed down to towns 11 km (6.8 mi) eastward, the village of Bacacay was buried 15 m (49 ft) beneath the lava. In Santo Domingo 100 people were killed by steam and falling debris or hot rocks. Other villages like San Roque, Santa Misericordia and Santo Niño became deathtraps. Ash was carried in black clouds as far as 160 km (99 mi) from the catastrophic event, which killed more than 400 people.

=== 1984 and 1993 eruptions ===
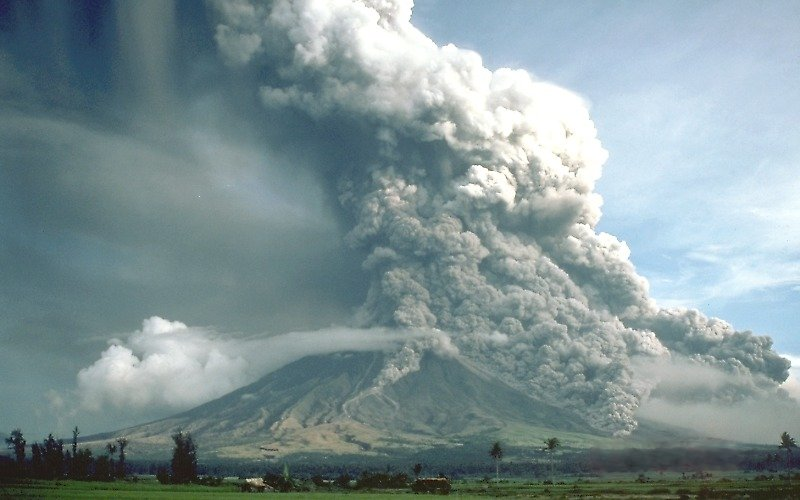
The eruption on September 23, 1984

No casualties were recorded from the 1984 eruption after more than 73,000 people were evacuated from the danger zones as recommended by PHIVOLCS scientists. But in 1993, pyroclastic flows killed 79 people, mainly farmers, during the eruption that also forced 50,000 residents evacuated, according to the Albay provincial government.

=== 1999 eruption ===
Mayon began its increasing activity in May, with hazard status associated raised to Alert Level 1. On June 22, Mayon emitted an ash column that rose to approximately 10 km (6.2 mi) above the vent; the status was later raised to Alert Level 2. The emission was recorded by the seismic network of the Philippine Institute of Volcanology and Seismology as an explosion that lasted for 10 minutes. No volcanic earthquakes nor other visible signs of abnormal activity were observed before the explosion.

=== 2000 eruptions ===
Mayon had experienced continuous emissions since 1999 and followed by a series of eruptions in the next two consecutive years.

On January 5, a 5 km (3.1 mi) high ash column was produced by an explosion. Growth of summit-crater dome and intensifying eruptions later signaled evacuations.

Past emissions had led to the growth of the lava dome beginning on February 12. On February 23, series of eruptions began. PHIVOLCS then recommended evacuation even beyond the permanent danger zone. On February 24, PHIVOLCS raised its status to the highest, Alert Level 5, with at least eight towns and one city warned of possible explosions with ash and lava flows, and several thousands forced to evacuate even outside identified danger zones. The most violent eruptions occurred from February 28 to March 1, and since then, declining activity was observed until April.

The National Disaster Risk Reduction and Management Council (NDCC) reported that the 2000 eruption displaced 14,114 families (68,426 persons) and damaged at least ₱89-million worth of property and crops.

=== 2001 eruption ===
The NDCC reported that another eruption in July affected 11,529 families (56,853 persons) and damaged at least ₱48-million worth of property and crops.

=== 2006 eruptions ===
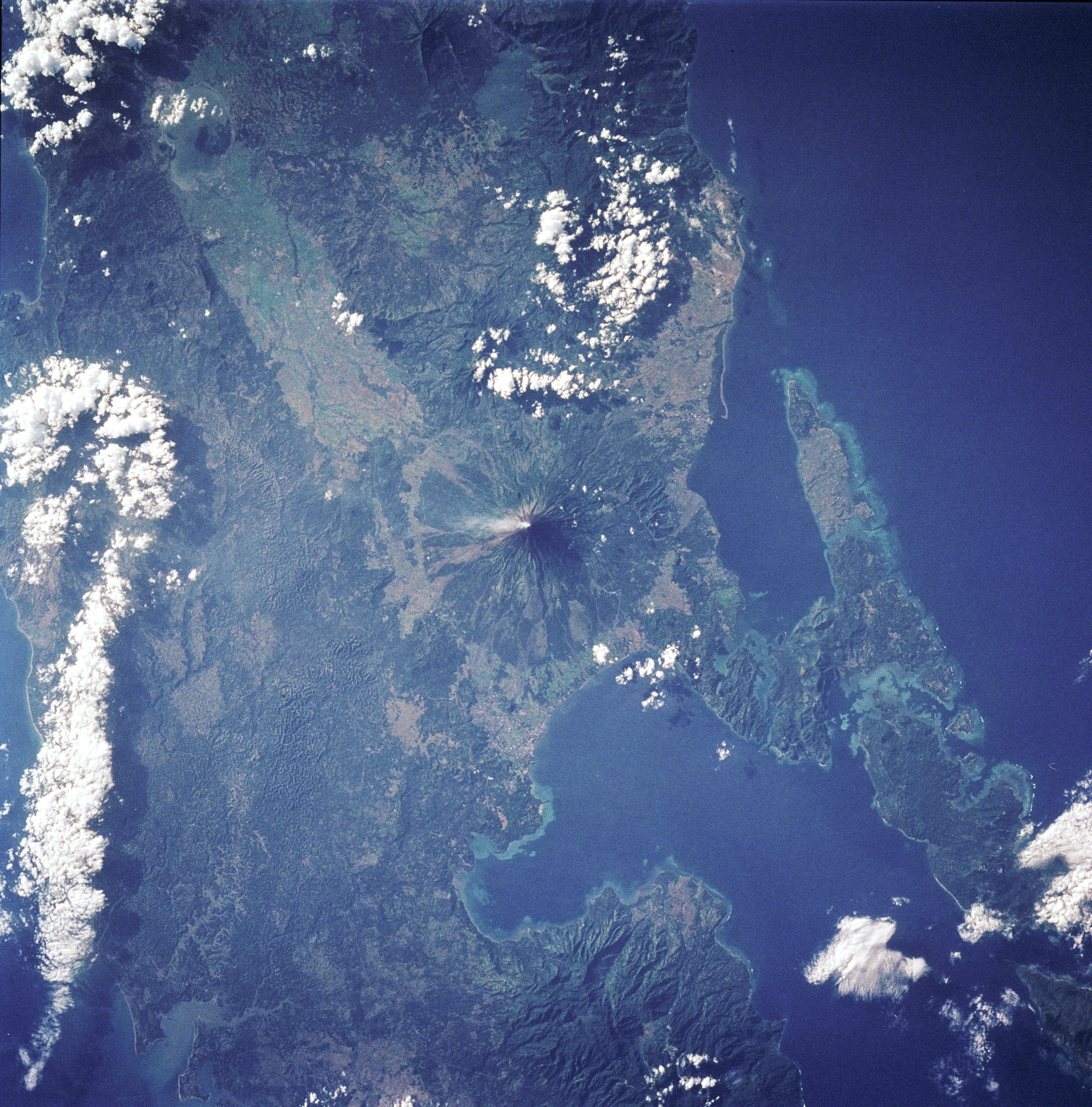
Mayon Volcano in satellite image taken on April 18, 1997.

Mayon's 48th eruption, since historic records commenced, occurred on July 13, followed by quiet effusion of lava that started on July 14. Nearly 40,000 people were evacuated from the 8-kilometre (5.0 mi) danger zone on the southeast flank of the volcano.

After an ash explosion on September 1, a general decline in the overall activity of Mayon was established. The decrease in key parameters such as seismicity, sulfur dioxide emission rates and ground inflation all indicated a waning condition. The slowdown in the eruptive activity was also evident from the decrease in intensity of crater glow and the diminishing volume of lava extruded from the summit. PHILVOLCS Alert Level 4 was lowered to Level 3 on September 11; to Level 2 on October 3; and to Level 1 on October 25.

=== 2008 eruption ===
On August 10, 2008, a small summit explosion ejected ash 200 m (660 ft) above the summit, which drifted east-northeast. In the weeks prior to the eruption, a visible glow increased within the crater and increased seismicity.

=== 2009–2010 eruptions ===
On July 10, 2009, PHIVOLCS raised the status from Alert Level 1 (low level unrest) to Alert Level 2 (moderate unrest) because the number of recorded low frequency volcanic earthquakes rose to the same level as those prior to the 2008 phreatic explosion.

At 5:32 a.m. on October 28, a minor ash explosion lasting for about one minute occurred in the summit crater. A brown ash column rose about 600 m (2,000 ft) above the crater and drifted northeast. In the prior 24 hours, 13 volcanic earthquakes were recorded. Steam emission was at moderate level, creeping downslope toward the southwest. PHIVOLCS maintained the Alert Status at Level 2, but later warned that with the approach of tropical cyclone international codename Mirinae, the danger of lahars and possible crater wall collapse would greatly increase and all specified precautions should be taken.

After dawn, field investigation showed ashfall had drifted southwest of the volcano. In the 24-hour period, the seismic network recorded 20 volcanic earthquakes. Alert Status was kept at Level 2.

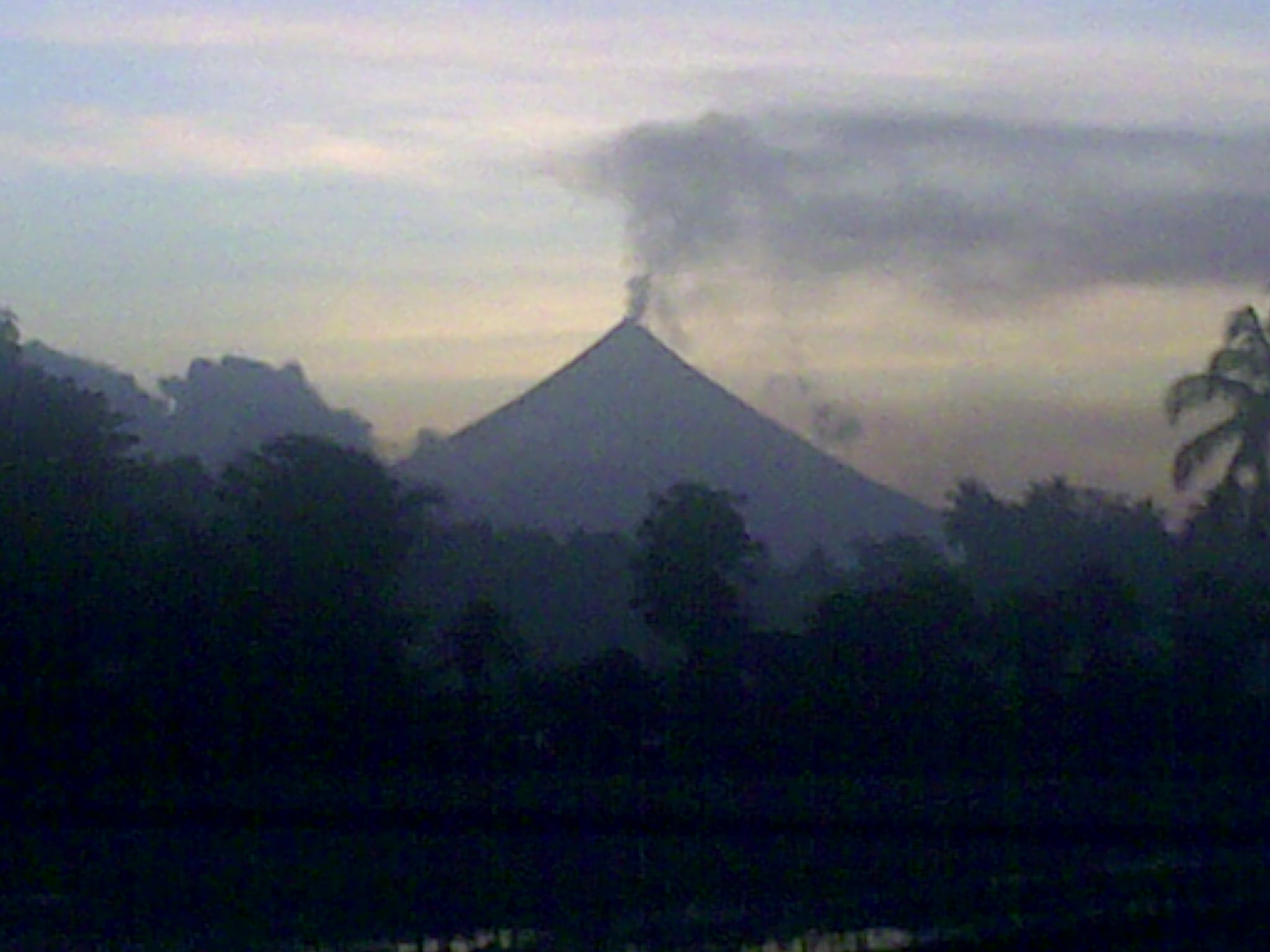
Mayon with ash explosion at dawn on December 18, 2009

At 8 pm on December 14, after 83 volcanic quakes in the preceding 24 hours and increased sulfur dioxide emissions, PHIVOLCS raised the Alert status to Level 3.

Early in the morning of December 15, a moderate ash explosion occurred at the summit crater and "quiet extrusion of lava" resulted in flows down to about 500 m (1,600 ft) from the summit. By evening, Albay Province authorities evacuated about 20,000 residents out of the 8-kilometre (5.0 mi) danger zone and into local evacuation centres. About 50,000 people live within the 8-kilometre (5.0 mi) zone.

On December 17, five ash ejections occurred, with one reaching 500 m (1,600 ft) above the summit. Sulfur dioxide emission increased to 2,758 tonnes per 24 hours, lava flows reached down to 1,500 metres (4,900 ft) below the summit, and incandescent fragments from the lava pile continuously rolling down Bonga Gully reached a distance of 3–4 km below the summit. By midday, a total of 33,833 people from 7,103 families had been evacuated, 72 percent of the total number of people that needed to be evacuated, according to Albay Governor Joey Salceda.

On December 20, PHIVOLCS raised Mayon's status level to alert level 4 because of an increasing lava flow in the southern portion of the volcano and an increase in sulfur dioxide emission to 750 tonnes (740 long tons; 830 short tons) per day. Almost 460 earthquakes in the volcano were monitored. In the border of the danger zone, rumbling sounds like thunder were heard. Over 9,000 families (44,394 people) were evacuated by the Philippine government from the base of the volcano. No civilian was permitted within the 8 km danger zone, which was cordoned off by the Philippine military who actively patrolled to enforce the "no-go" rule and to ensure no damage or loss of property of those evacuated.

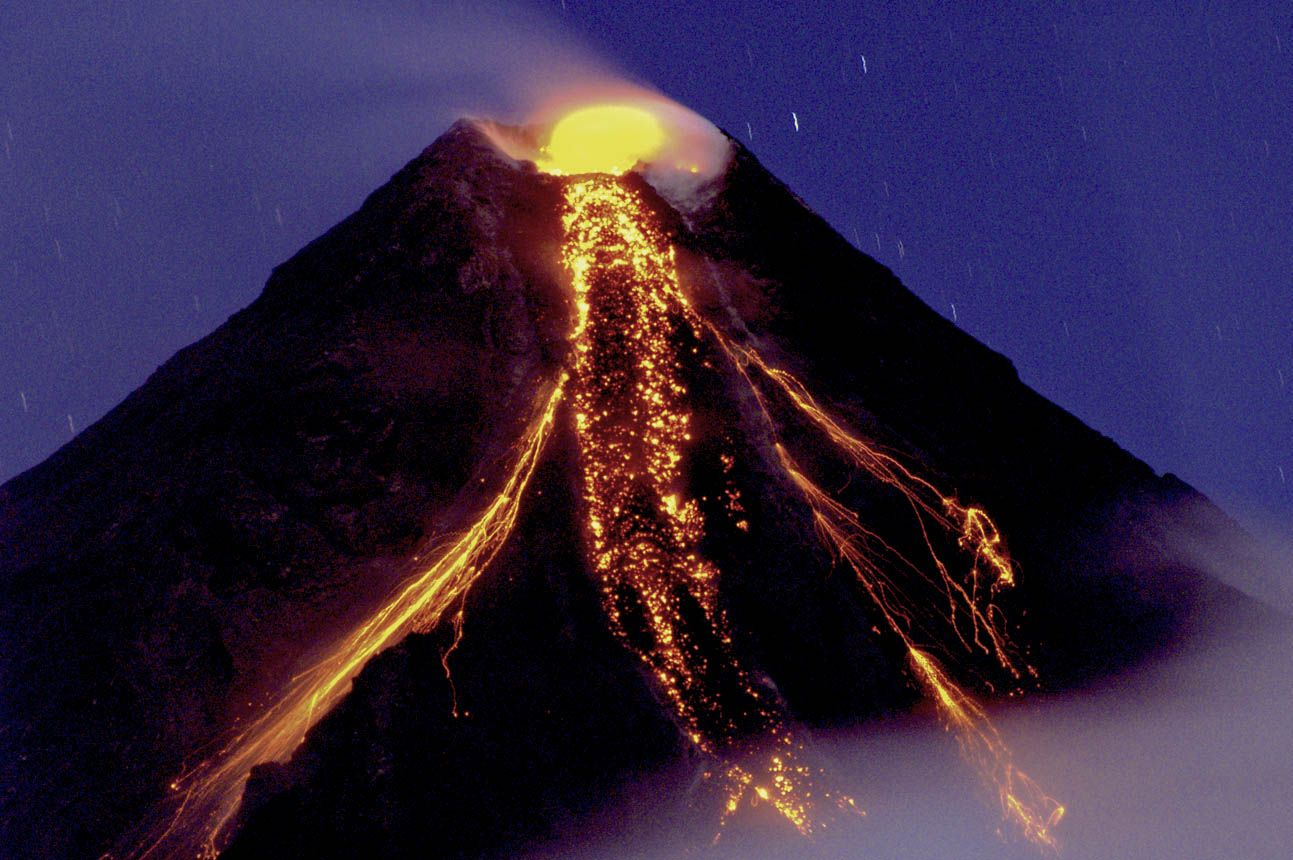
Mayon erupting on December 29, 2009

Alert level 4 was maintained as the volcano remained restive through December, prompting affected residents to spend Christmas and the New Year in evacuation centers. On December 25, sulfur dioxide emissions peaked at 8,993 tonnes (8,851 long tons; 9,913 short tons) per day. On December 28, PHIVOLCS director Renato Solidum commented on the status of the volcano, "You might think it is taking a break but the volcano is still swelling." On the next day December 29, a civil aviation warning for the airspace near the summit was included in the volcano bulletins. The ejected volcanic material since the start of the eruption was estimated to have been between 20,000,000 to 23,000,000 m^{3} (710,000,000 to 810,000,000 cu ft) of rocks and volcanic debris, compared to 50,000,000 to 60,000,000 m^{3} (1.8×10^{9} to 2.1×10^{9} cu ft) in recent eruptions.

On January 2, 2010, PHIVOLCS lowered the alert level of the volcano from level 4 to level 3, citing decreasing activity observed over the prior four days. The state agency noted the absence of ash ejections and relative weakness of steam emissions and the gradual decrease in sulfur dioxide emissions from a maximum of 8,993 t (8,851 long tons; 9,913 short tons) per day to 2,621 tonnes (2,580 long tons; 2,889 short tons) per day. 7,218 families within the 7–8 km danger zones returned to their homes, while 2,728 families residing in the 4–6 km danger zone remained in the evacuation centers pending a decision to further lower the alert level.

On January 13, PHIVOLCS reduced the Alert Level from 3 to 2 due to a further reduction in the likelihood of hazardous eruption.

==== Government response ====
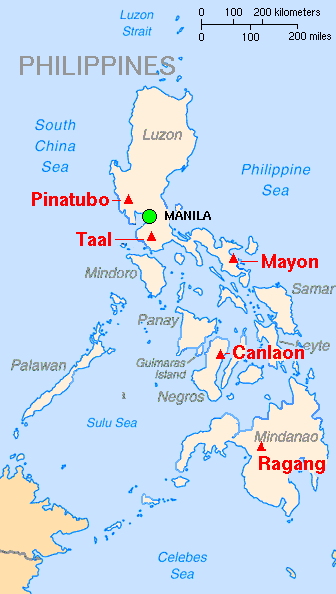
Map showing major volcanoes of the Philippines

Albay governor Joey Salceda declared the disaster zone an 'open city' area to encourage aid from external groups. Potential donors of relief goods were not required to secure clearance from the Provincial Disaster Coordinating Council, and were coordinated directly with support groups at the local government level.

The restiveness of the volcano also stimulated the tourism industry of the province. Up to 2,400 tourists per day arrived in the area in the two weeks after the volcano started erupting on December 14, filling local hotels, compared to a more modest average of 200 in the days prior. However, it was reported that some tourists lured by local "guides" ignored government warnings not to venture into the 8-kilometre (5.0 mi) danger zone. "It's a big problem. I think the first violation of the zero casualty (record) will be a dead tourist," said Salceda.

Speaking about thrill-seekers finding their way into the area, Salceda warned, "At the moment of the eruption, the local guides will have better chance of getting out. The helpless tourist will be left behind."

==== International response ====
Following the declaration of alert level 3 for the volcano, the United States issued an advisory cautioning its nationals from traveling to Mayon. Canada and the United Kingdom also posted advisories discouraging their nationals from visiting the volcano.

The United States government committed $100,000 in financial aid for the evacuees of Mayon. In cooperation with the Philippine government the assistance was delivered through the Philippine National Red Cross and other NGOs by USAID.

The Albay provincial government ordered the local military to add more checkpoints, place roadblocks and arrest tourists caught traveling inside the 8 km (5.0 mi) danger zone.

Power and water supply were cut off within the danger zone to further discourage residents from returning. The Commission on Human Rights allowed the use of emergency measures and gave the authorities clearance to forcibly evacuate residents who refused to leave.

When the alert level around the volcano was lowered from alert level 4 to alert level 3 on January 2, 2010, the Albay provincial government ordered a decampment of some 47,000 displaced residents from the evacuation centers. Power and water supply in the danger zones were restored. Military vehicles were used to transport the evacuees back to their homes, while food supplies and temporary employment through the Department of Social Welfare and Development (DSWD) were provided to the heads of each family. As of January 3, 2010, the National Disaster Coordinating Council reported the overall cost of humanitarian aid and other assistance provided by the government and non-government organizations (NGOs) has reached over 61 million pesos since the start of the eruption.

The United Nations World Food Programme (UN-WFP) delivered 20 tons of high energy biscuits to the evacuees to complement supplies provided by the DSWD, with more allocated from emergency food stocks intended for relief from the effects of the 2009 Pacific typhoon season. When the alert level was downgraded to level 3 on January 2, 2010, UN-WFP provided three days worth of food for evacuees returning to their homes who will continue to receive supplies already set aside for them.

=== 2013 phreatic eruption ===
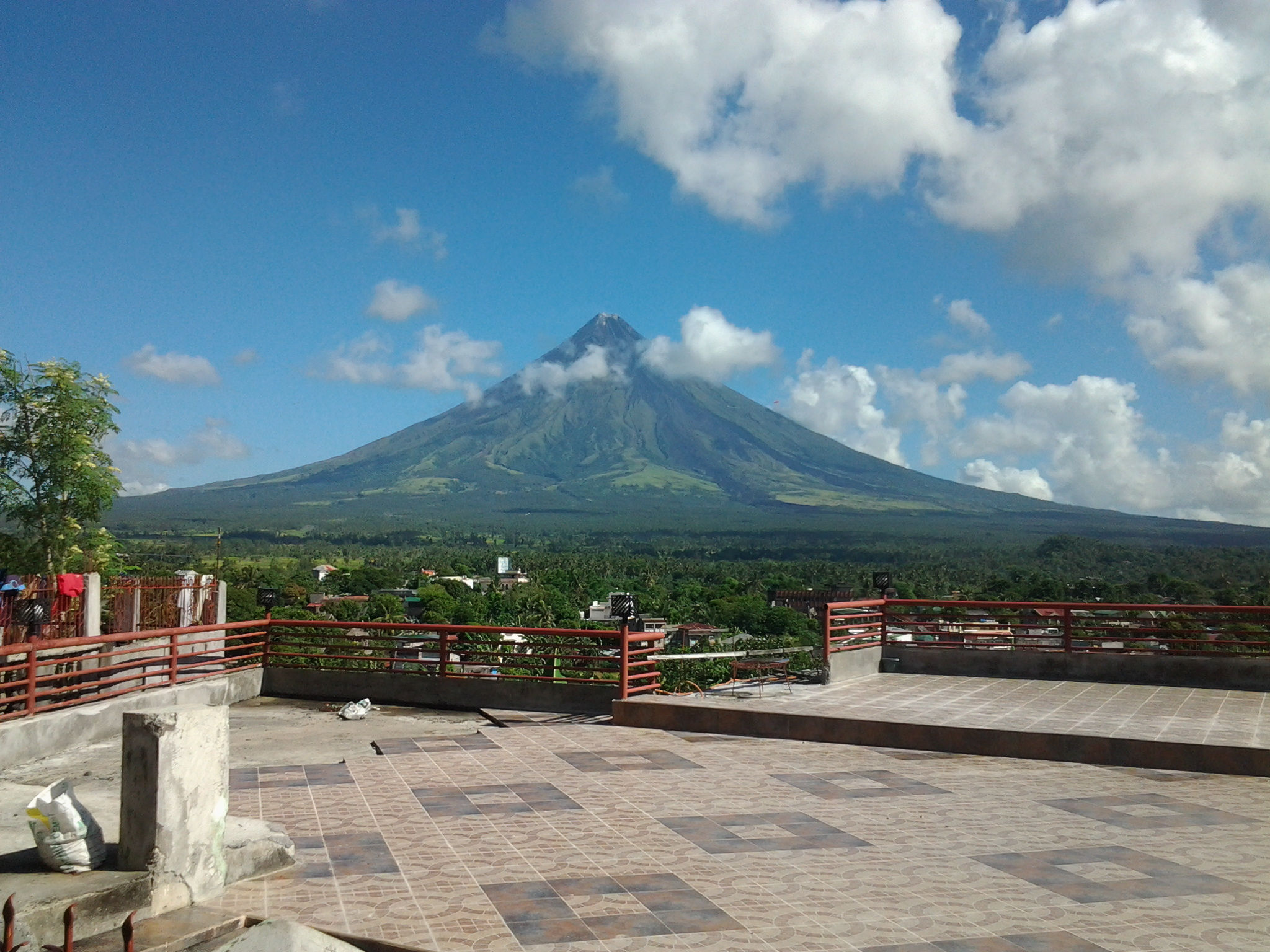
Mount Mayon in 2013

On May 7, 2013, at 8 a.m. (PST), the volcano produced a surprise phreatic eruption lasting 73 seconds. Ash, steam and rock were produced during this eruption. Ash clouds reached 500 m (1,600 ft) above the volcano's summit and drifted west southwest. The event killed five climbers, of whom three were German, one was a Spaniard living in Germany, and one was a Filipino tour guide. Seven others were reported injured. The bodies of the hikers were soon located by the authorities. However, due to rugged and slippery terrain, the hikers' remains were slowly transferred from Camp 2 to Camp 1, the site of the rescue operations at the foot of the volcano. According to Butch Rivera of Bicol Regional Training and Teaching Hospital, the hikers died due to trauma in their bodies, and suffocation. Authorities were also able to rescue a Thai national who was unable to walk due to fatigue and had suffered a broken arm and burns on the neck and back. Despite the eruption, the Philippine Institute of Volcanology and Seismology stated that the alert level would remain at 0. No volcanic earthquake activity was detected in the 24 hours prior to the eruption as no indication of further intensification of volcanic activity was observed, and no evacuation was being planned.

==== International response ====
The government of the United Kingdom advised its nationals to follow the advisories given by the local authorities, and respect the 6 km permanent danger zone. The advisory was given a day after the explosion.

=== 2014 ===
On August 12, 2014, a new 30–50 m (98–164 ft) high lava dome appeared in the summit crater. This event was preceded by inflations of the volcano (measured by precise leveling, tilt data, and GPS), and increases in sulfur dioxide gas emissions. On September 14, rockfall events at the southeastern rim of the crater and heightened seismic activity caused PHIVOLCS to increase the alert level for Mayon from 2 to 3, which indicates relatively high unrest with magma at the crater, and that hazardous eruption is possible within weeks.

The rockfalls and visible incandescence of the crater from molten lava and hot volcanic gas both indicated a possible incipient breaching of the growing summit lava dome. On September 15, NASA's Moderate-Resolution Imaging Spectroradiometer (MODIS) detected thermal anomalies near Mayon's summit, consistent with magma at the surface. On September 16, provincial governor Joey Salceda said that the government would begin to "fast-track the preparation to evacuate 12,000 families in the 6–8 km (3.7–5.0 mi) extended danger zone", and soldiers would enforce the no-go areas.

On September 18, PHIVOLCS reported 142 VT earthquake events and 251 rockfall events. White steam plumes drifted to the south-southwest and rain clouds covered the summit. Sulfur dioxide (SO_{2}) emission was measured at 757 tonnes (745 long tons; 834 short tons) after a peak of 2,360 tonnes (2,320 long tons; 2,600 short tons) on September 6. Deformation (precise leveling and tiltmeters) during the 3rd week of August 2014 recorded edifice inflation.

=== 2018 activity ===
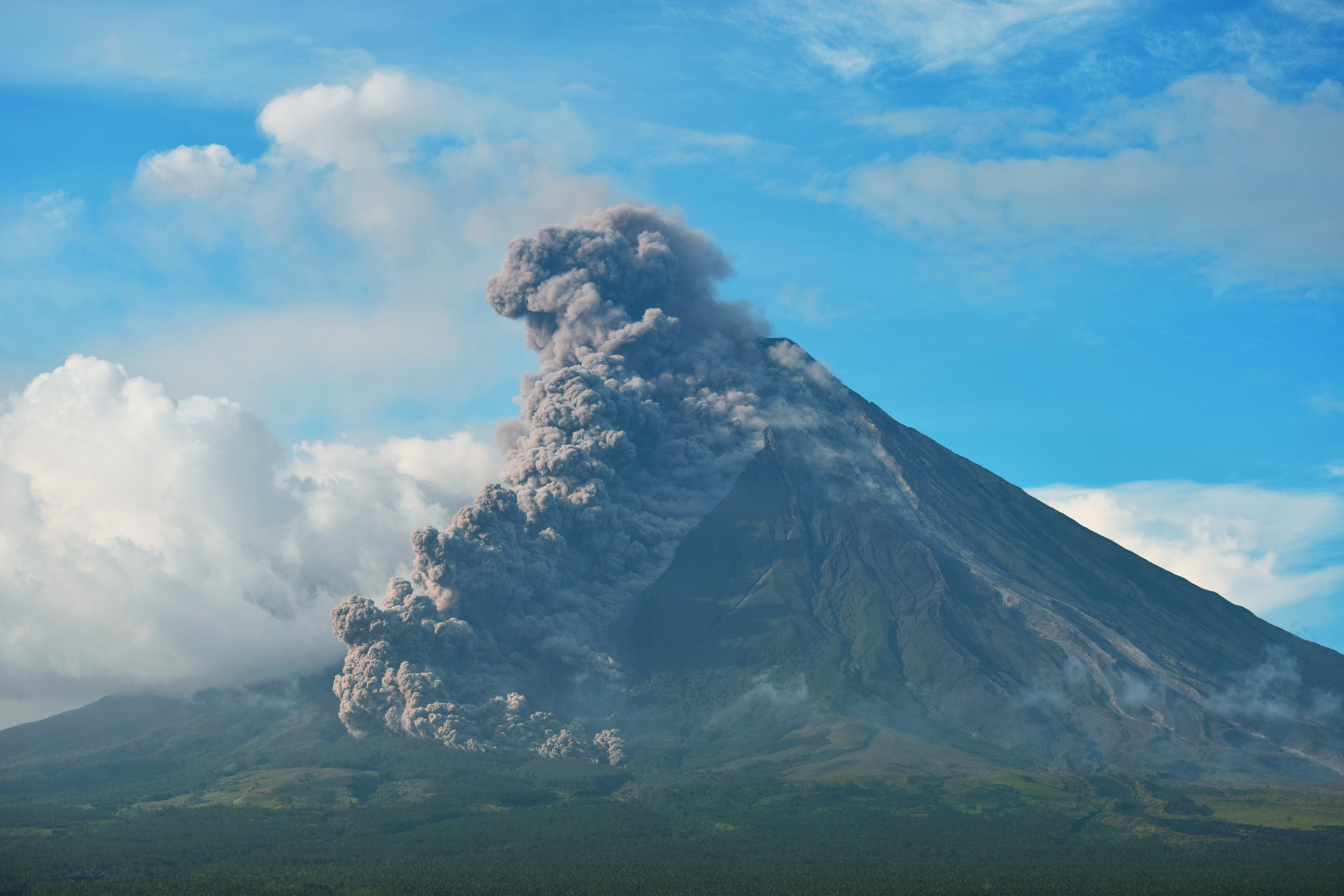
Eruption on January 22, 2018

On January 13, 2018, at 4:21 pm (PST), a phreatic eruption occurred that propelled a grayish steam and ash plume approximately 2500 meters high that drifted to the southwest side of the volcano. The activity lasted approximately 1 hour and 47 minutes and ash fell in Barangay Anoling, Daraga, Barangays Sua, Quirangay, Tumpa, Ilawod and Salugan of Camalig and in Barangays Tandarora, Maninila, and Travesia in Guinobatan. Sulfuric odor was noted by residents of Camalig town proper. Rumbling sounds were also heard by residents of Brgy. Anoling, Daraga and rockfall events were intermittently recorded. Faint crater glow was first observed at 10:16 pm. The event prompted PHIVOLCS to raise the Alert Level of Mayon from Alert Level 1 (abnormal) to Alert Level 2- (increasing unrest for the people's safety). About 40,000 residents were displaced in the resulting evacuation.

On January 14, Mayon's alert status was upgraded to Alert Level 3 (increased tendency towards a hazardous eruption) after 3 phreatic eruptions and 158 rockfall events were recorded. The summit crater also exhibited a bright glow signifying the growth of a new lava dome and the start of lava flows towards its slopes.

On January 16, the province of Albay declared a state of calamity as lava flows reached the limits of the 6 km (3.7 mi) evacuation zone.

On January 22, Alert Level 4 was raised after Mayon spewed a 3 km (1.9 mi) tall ash column at around 12:45 pm. Classes in all levels in private and public schools were suspended in the whole province of Albay. By evening, lava fountains were spewed from the crater with pyroclastic flows and ash plumes. Lava bombs and rockfalls could also be observed and rumbling sounds from the eruptions could be heard. The eruption type was classified as a Strombolian eruption.

On January 23, Mayon spewed 300 to 500 m (980 to 1,640 ft) lava fountains and ash plumes with a 4 to 5-hour interval. Lava bombs and rockfalls could also be observed and sounds from the volcano could be heard. Classes in all levels, both public and private were still suspended, work in some places were suspended as well. The danger zone was expanded up to 9 km (5.6 mi) despite remaining at Alert Level 4 and residents from the expanded danger zone were evacuated.

On January 24, a column of ash and lava fountains were spewed again with an interval of 4 to 5 hours. Fire bombs and rockfalls were observed and sounds from the eruptions were heard.

On January 25, a column of ash and lava fountains were spewed again. Fire bombs and rockfalls were observed and sounds from the eruptions were heard. The eruptions had an interval of 3 to 5 hours.

Alert Level 4 was maintained at the volcano for the rest of January and all throughout the month of February as it remained restive. On March 6, after observing a decline in volcanic activity, PHIVOLCS downgraded the alert level back to Alert Level 3. On March 29, after observing a further decline in activity, PHIVOLCS lowered the alert level back to Alert Level 2 signifying the end of Mayon's eruptive activity and the volcano's decline to a moderate level of unrest.

On December 26, Mayon caused two phreatic explosions but remained under Alert Level 2.

=== 2020 crater glow ===
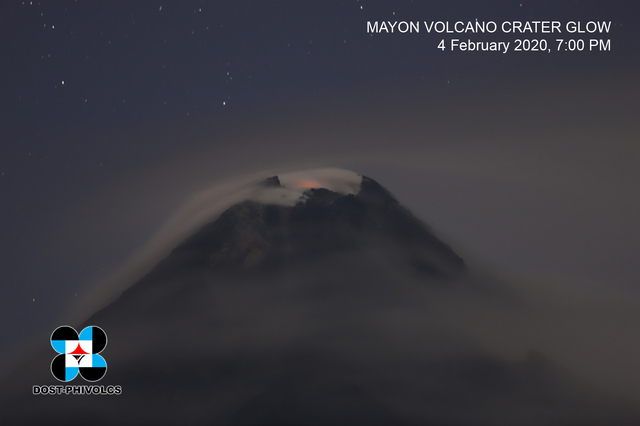
2020 Mayon Volcano Crater Glow

On the evening of February 4, 2020, PHIVOLCS reported that the crater of Mayon showed crater glow, attributed to magma which was still present slightly underneath the surface of the volcano. Even though this phenomenon alerted the officials and the public, Mayon remained at an Alert Level 2 out of 5. The Alert Level 2 was lowered to Alert Level 1 on July 17, 2020. And on July 30, 2021, PHIVOLCS-DOST lifted the alert level status of the volcano.

=== 2022 activity ===
On October 1, 2022, Mayon released 391 tonnes (385 long tons; 431 short tons) of sulfur dioxide, and its edifice was also slightly inflated.

PHIVOLCS observed a faint crater glow at the summit of Mayon. One volcanic earthquake was detected in the last 24-hour observation period. Plumes were also seen drifting west-northwest and westward.

On October 7, the status of Mayon was raised to Alert Level 2 by PHIVOLCS, due to exhibiting "increasing unrest".

=== 2023 eruption ===
On June 5, 2023, PHIVOLCS raised the status of Mayon Volcano to Alert Level 2 due to its "increasing unrest", after it observed an increase in rockfall from the volcano's summit lava dome since the last week of April, indicating aseismic growth. Rockfall increased in frequency from an average of five events per day to 49 events per day from June 4 at 5:00 a.m. to June 5 at 5:00 a.m. A total of 318 rockfall events were recorded by the Mayon Volcano Network since April 1 while 26 volcanic earthquakes were recorded for the same period.

On June 8, the alert level in Mayon was raised to Level 3, signifying "increased tendency towards a hazardous eruption", and that an effusive magmatic eruption was taking place. An incandescent rockfall was recorded in the evening. On June 9, PHIVOLCS recorded six pyroclastic flows and 199 rockfall events from the volcano overnight. The province of Albay was placed under a state of calamity due to the unrest.

On June 11–12 there were more eruptions. On the night of June 15, the volcano registered its largest pyroclastic flow since the resumption of its activity, with ashfall affecting parts of Ligao and Guinobatan. On June 18, the volcano's lava flow reached a maximum length of 1.5 km (0.93 mi) from the crater, which ran down the Mi-isi gully in the south side and the Bonga gully in the southeastern side of the volcano, while debris from the summit reached as far as 3.3 km (2.1 mi) from the crater.

Twenty thousand people living within the volcano's danger zone were evacuated. At least 628 people required medical treatment due to the effects of the eruption and complications arising from evacuation measures.

On June 30, Mayon emitted a pyroclastic flow that lasted four minutes and traveled around 3 to 4 km (1.9 to 2.5 mi) downslope on the Basud Gully. Ashfall was reported in Tabaco City.

On December 8, PHIVOLCS lowered the volcano's activity status to alert level 2.

=== 2024 ===
On February 4, 2024, Mayon underwent a phreatic eruption that lasted four minutes and nine seconds and produced a 1.2 km (0.75 mi) high plume. On March 5, PHIVOLCS lowered the volcano's alert status to level 1.

=== 2026 ===
On January 1, 2026, PHIVOLCS raised Mayon Volcano to Alert Level 2 amid escalating signs of volcanic unrest, with 47 rockfall events recorded the previous day—the highest single-day total observed in the past year. Five days later, on January 6, the alert level was further elevated to Alert Level 3 following a magmatic eruption that generated pyroclastic density currents down the volcano’s southeastern slope. On January 20, a state of calamity was declared in Tabaco due to the ongoing activity.

On May 2, a lava flow collapse caused a pyroclastic flow on its southwestern slopes with an estimated run-out of 4 km (2.5 mi). Ash fell as far as San Pascual on the island province of Masbate, while 102,406 people were affected, mostly in Camalig and Guinobatan. Damages to agriculture reached ₱6.69 million (US$135,923.44). A state of calamity was subsequently declared in three cities (Legazpi, Ligao and Tabaco) and five municipalities (Camalig, Malilipot, Santo Domingo, Daraga, and Guinobatan) following the event. On May 25, PHIVOLCS recorded a meteor which disintegrated midair close to Mayon.

On October 30, at 11:53 AM, a moderately explosive eruption occurred, sending a dense, rapidly ascending and billowing ash plume 3,000 meters above the summit crater, ash dispersed to the west-southwest by moderate winds. At 12:30 PM, PHIVOLCS issued a bulletin raising the alert level from 2 to 3, following the suspension of classes in the whole province of Albay, announced by Governor Noel Rosal.

=== Summary recent eruptions ===
Summary of confirmed well dated recent eruptions
Start Date	End Date	VEI	Comment
January 6, 2026	-	-	Eruptions continuing including on May 2, 2026 and October 30, 2026
May 30, 2024	July 18, 2024	1	
April 27, 2023	February 4, 2024	2	The eruption start is uncertain ± 2 days, ended with phreatic eruption.
June 6, 2022	October 7, 2022	0	
January 13, 2018	July 31, 2019	3	The eruption end is uncertain ± 30 days
August 15, 2014	October 19, 2014	0	
May 7, 2013	May 7, 2013	1	
September 15, 2009	January 1, 2010	2	
August 10, 2008	August 10, 2008	1	
July 13, 2006	October 1, 2006	1	
February 21, 2006	February 23, 2006	1	
August 17, 2005	August 17, 2005	0	May have started on August 16, 2005
June 3, 2004	September 12, 2004	1	
March 17, 2003	May 14, 2003	2	
October 11, 2003	October 11, 2003	1	
January 8, 2001	August 8, 2001	3	
July 16, 2000	August 31, 2000	2	
June 22, 1999	March 19, 2000	3	
February 2, 1993	April 4, 1994	2	VTE uncertain. 79 deaths.
September 9, 1984	October 6, 1984	3	
March 7, 1978	September 16, 1978	2	The eruption end is uncertain ± 15 days
April 21, 1968	May 20, 1968	3	

== Deadly lahars ==
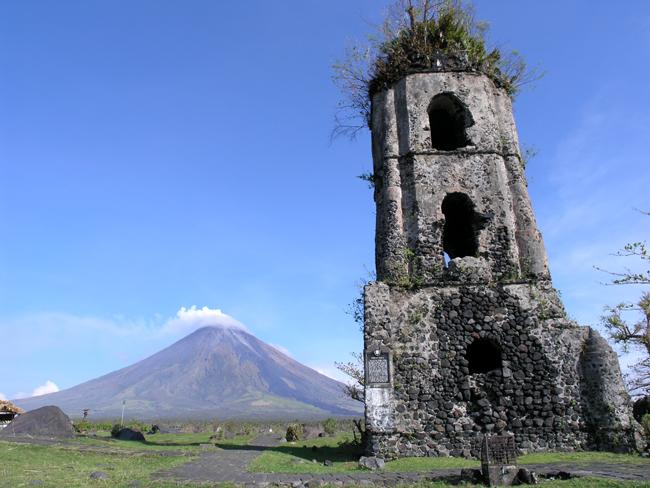
The bell tower is what remains of the Cagsawa Church, which was damaged by the 1814 eruption of Mayon. It withstood the damage done by Typhoon Durian (Reming) in 2006.

On November 30, 2006, strong rainfall which accompanied Typhoon Durian produced lahars from the volcanic ash and boulders of the last eruption killing at least 1,266 people. The precise figure may never be known since many people were buried under the mudslides. A large portion of the village of Padang, an outer suburb of Legazpi City, was covered in mud up to the houses' roofs. Students from Aquinas University in Barangay Rawis, also in Legazpi, were among those killed as mudslides engulfed their dormitory. Central Legazpi escaped the mudslide but suffered from severe flooding and power cuts.

Parts of the town of Daraga were also devastated, including the Cagsawa area, where the ruins from the eruption of 1814 were partially buried once again. Large areas of Guinobatan were destroyed, particularly Barangay Maipon.

A similar post-eruption lahar occurred in October 1766, months after the July eruption of that year. The heavy rainfall also accompanying a violent typhoon carried down disintegrated fragmental ejecta, burying plantations and whole villages. In 1825, the event was repeated in Cagsawa killing 1,500 people.

== Monitoring ==
Three telemetric units are installed on Mayon's slopes, which send information to the seven seismometers in different locations around the volcano. These instruments relay data to the Ligñon Hill observatory and the PHIVOLCS central headquarters on the University of the Philippines Diliman campus.

PHIVOLCS also deploys electronic distance meters (EDMs), precise leveling benchmarks, and portable fly spectrometers to monitor the volcano's daily activity.

=== Alert levels ===
Mayon Volcano Alert Levels
Alert Level	Criteria	Interpretation/Recommendation
0 No Alert (Normal)	All monitored parameters within background levels. Unremarkable level of volcanic earthquakes occurring within the volcano area.	Quiescence; no magmatic eruption is foreseen. However, there are perennial hazards (sudden explosions, rockfalls and landslides) within the four (4) kilometer-radius Permanent Danger Zone (PDZ) that may occur suddenly and without warning.
1 (Low Level of Volcanic Unrest)	Slight increase in volcanic earthquake and steam/gas activity. Sporadic explosions from the summit crater or new vents. Notable increase in the temperature, acidity and volcanic gas concentrations of monitored springs and fumaroles. Slight inflation or swelling of the edifice.	Hydrothermal, magmatic, or tectonic disturbances may be underway. The source of activity may be shallow, near the summit crater or in the vicinity of the edifice. Entry into the PDZ must be prohibited.
2 (Moderate Level of Volcanic Unrest)	Elevated levels of any of the following parameters: volcanic earthquake, temperature, acidity and volcanic gas concentrations of monitored springs and fumaroles, steam and ash explosions from the summit crater or new vents, inflation or swelling of the edifice.	Probable intrusion of magma at depth, which may or may not lead to magmatic eruption. Entry within PDZ must be prohibited.
3 (High Level of Volcanic Unrest)	Sustained increases in the levels of volcanic earthquakes, some of which may be perceptible. More energetic and frequent steam/ash explosions. Sustained increases in the temperature, acidity and volcanic gas concentrations of springs and fumaroles, and in the levels of ground deformation or swelling of the edifice. Activity at the summit may involve sluggish lava extrusion with resultant rockfall.	Magmatic intrusion to shallow levels of the edifice is driving unrest, with indications that hazardous eruption could occur in weeks. Danger zones may be expanded to a radius of six (6) kilometers from the summit crater or active vent.
4 (Hazardous Eruption Imminent)	Intensifying unrest characterized by earthquake swarms and volcanic tremor, many of which may be perceptible. Frequent strong ash explosions. Increasing rates of ground deformation and swelling of the edifice. Increasing rates of lava extrusion with increased frequency and volume of rockfall and volcanic gas flux, or abrupt decrease in volcanic gas flux due to plugging of lava at the summit crater or active vent.	Low-level magmatic eruption underway, which can progress to highly hazardous major eruption within hours or days. Danger zones may be expanded to a radius of ten (10) kilometers or more from the summit crater or active vent.
5 (Hazardous Eruption in Progress)	Magmatic eruption characterized by explosive production of tall ash-laden eruption columns, and/or descent and frequent failure of voluminous lava flows. Generation of deadly pyroclastic flows, surges and/or lateral blasts and widespread tephra fall (ashfall). Lahars generate along river channels.	Life-threatening major eruption producing volcanic hazards that endanger communities. Danger zones may be expanded to fourteen (14) kilometers as eruption progresses.

== Mythology ==
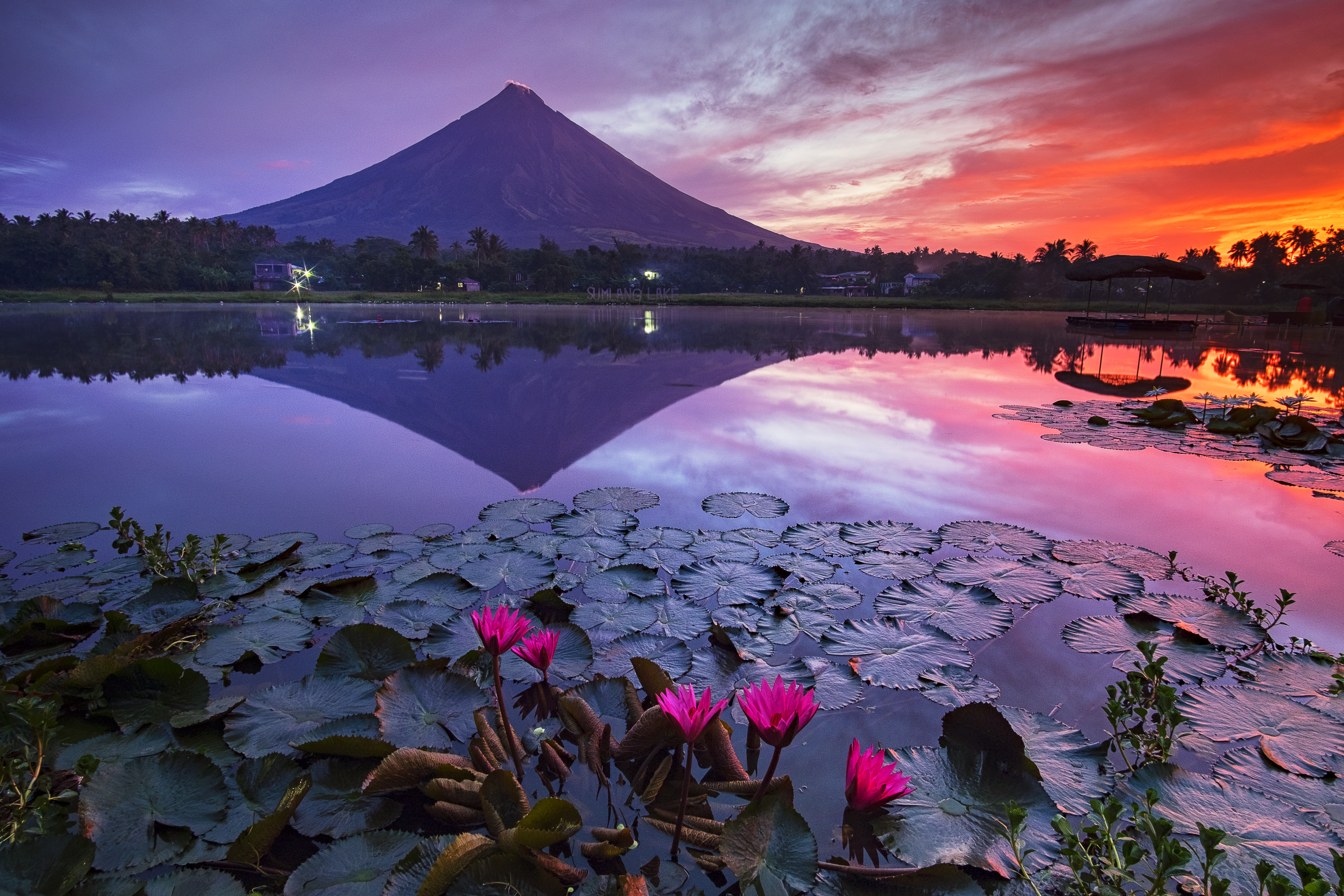
Mayon as viewed from Sumlang Lake in Camalig, Albay in May 2017

It is said that the volcano grew from the burial grounds of lovers Magayon and Panganoron. Thus, the ancient Bicolanos named it after the legendary princess-heroine Daragang Magayon (English: Beautiful Lady). After some time, the volcano was chosen as the abode of the supreme god of the Bicolano people, Gugurang, who also chose Mayon as the repository of the sacred fire of Ibalon. Numerous festivals and rituals are associated with the volcano and its landscape.

== Incidents and accidents ==
On February 23, 2023, a twin engine Cessna 340 airplane owned by the Energy Development Corporation departed Bicol International Airport in the early morning on an executive flight to the capital Manila. A few minutes after takeoff, while climbing to an altitude of 6,000 ft (1,800 m), it impacted the rocky slope of Mt. Mayon located about 16 km (9.9 mi) north of the airport. The wreckage was found the next day near the crater of the volcano. The airplane disintegrated on impact and all four occupants, including two Australians, were killed.

== See also ==
- Indigenous Philippine shrines and sacred grounds
- Cagsawa Ruins
- List of volcanoes in the Philippines
  - List of active volcanoes in the Philippines
  - List of potentially active volcanoes in the Philippines
  - List of inactive volcanoes in the Philippines
- List of volcanic eruptions by death toll
- List of protected areas of the Philippines
- List of Southeast Asian mountains
- List of mountains in the Philippines
  - List of Ultras of the Philippines
- Geography of the Philippines
[top]
