= Charles Hamilton Smith =

British Army officer, artist, naturalist, antiquary and spy

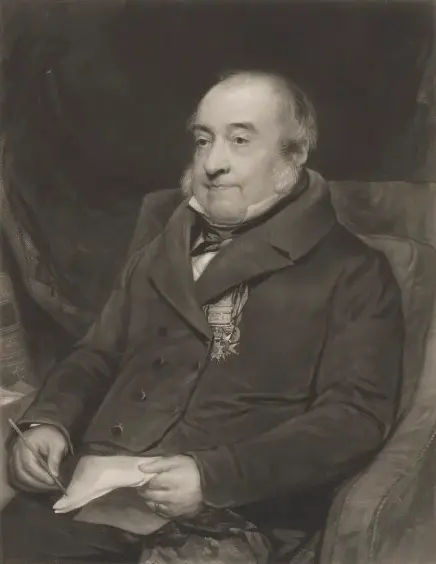
1841 lithograph of Smith by James Scott after John Opie

Lieutenant-Colonel Charles Hamilton Smith, KH, KW, FRS, FLS (26 December 1776 – 21 September 1859) was a British Army officer, artist, naturalist, antiquary and spy.

== Military service ==
His military career began in 1787, when he studied at the Austrian academy for artillery and engineers at Mechelen and Leuven in Flanders. Although his military service, which ended in 1820 and included the Napoleonic Wars, had him travel extensively (including the West Indies, Canada, and United States), much of his time was spent at a desk job in Britain. One of his noteworthy achievements was an 1800 experiment to determine which colour should be used for military uniforms. The increasing accuracy of firearms, especially rifles, brought advantages to shades which offer a less distinctive target – by testing the accuracy of a rifle company against grey, green, and red targets, he showed scientifically the advantages of grey (and to a lesser extent, green) uniforms over red ones common at the time, and recommended that grey be adopted for riflemen and light infantry. The British Army did not heed his advice, with green becoming the colour associated with light infantry. Initially commissioned into the 60th (Royal American) Regiment, ten years later Smith transferred to the 6th Foot.

== Antiquary, naturalist, and illustrator ==
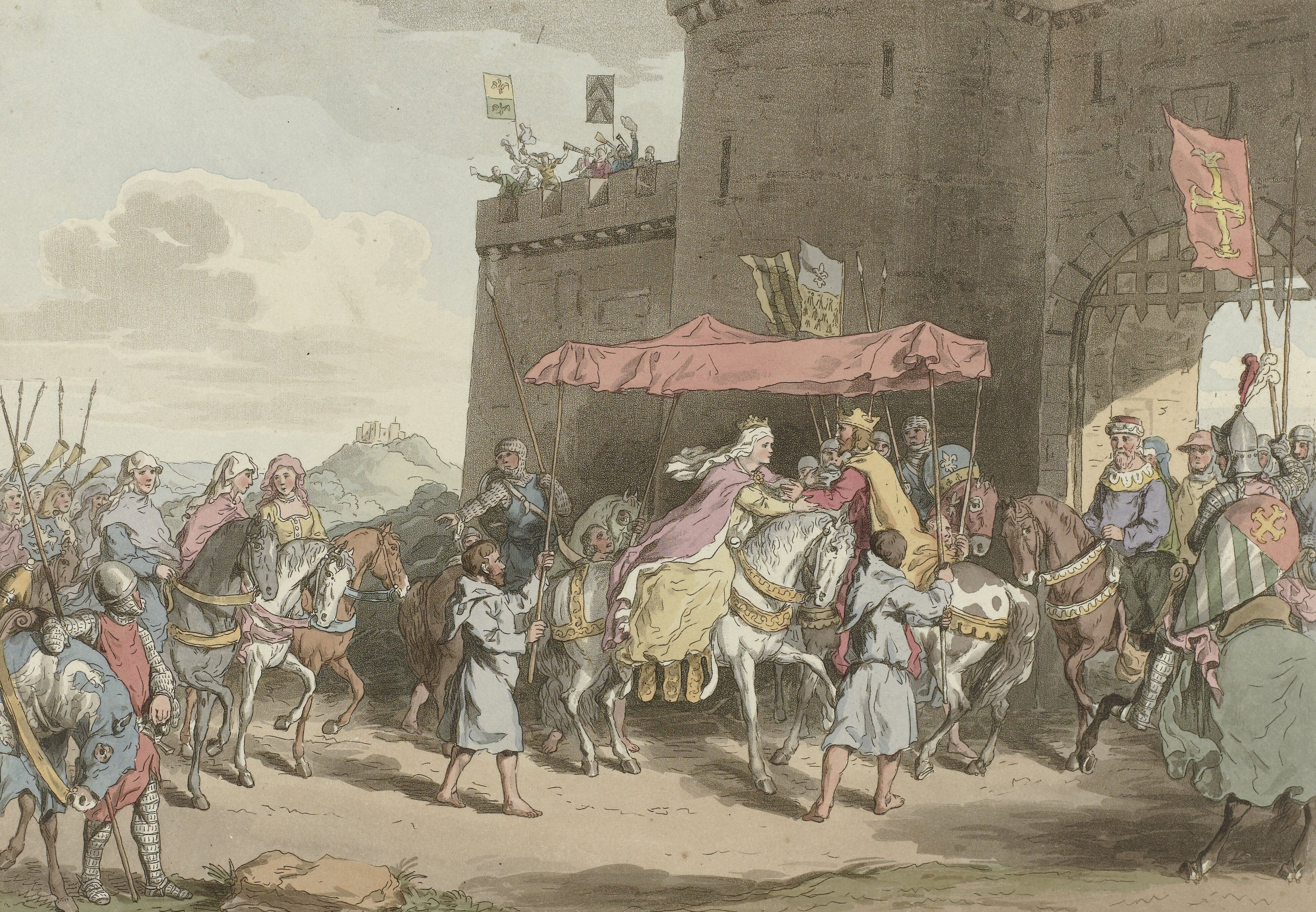
Illustration by Smith of English dress in 1250

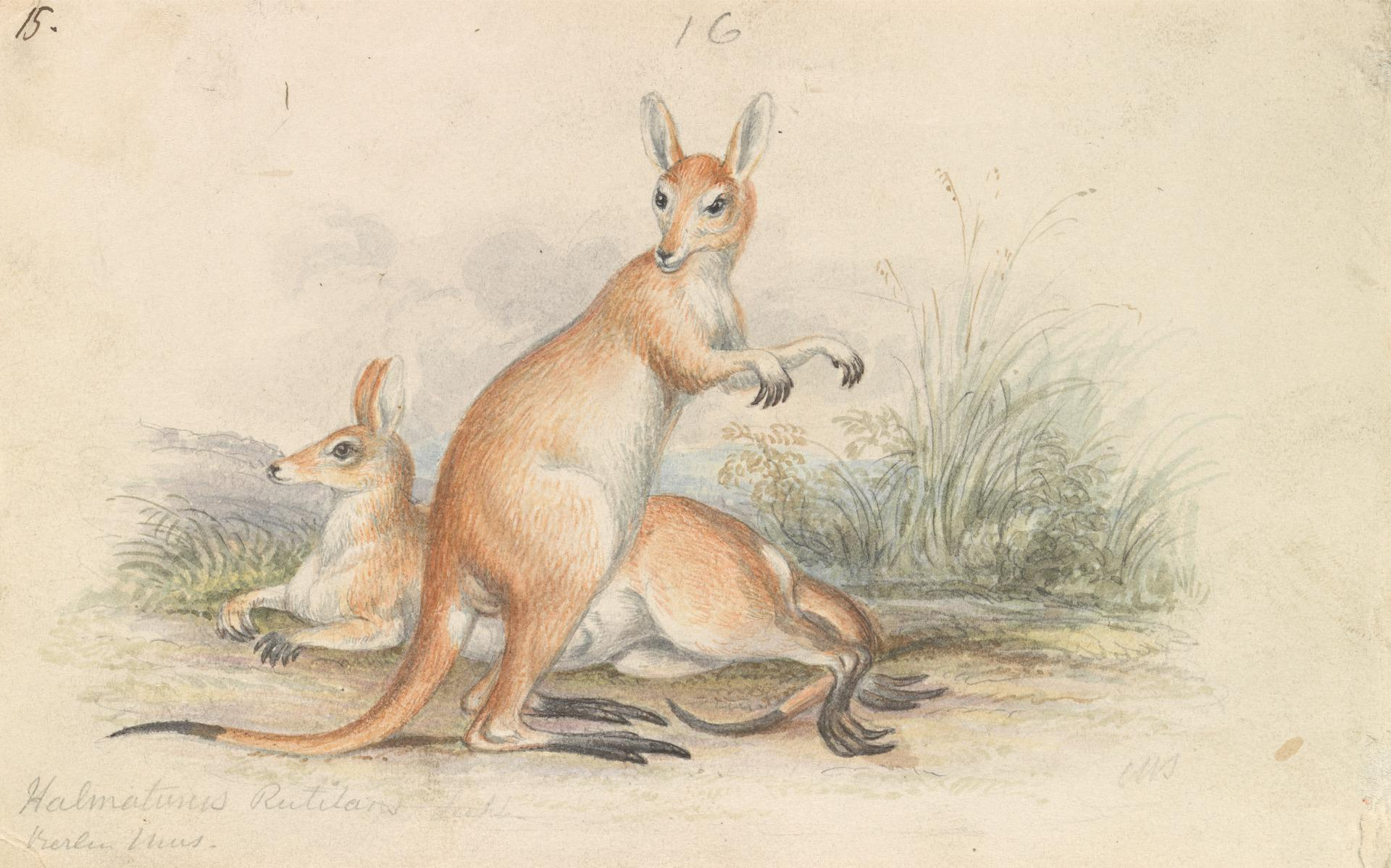
Halmaturus Rutilans

As a prolific self-taught illustrator, he is also known in military history circles for Costume of the Army of the British Empire, produced towards the end of the Napoleonic Wars, and an accurate depiction of contemporary British uniform. As an antiquarian, he also produced, in collaboration with Samuel Rush Meyrick, Costume of the Original Inhabitants of the British Islands, 1815, and The Ancient Costume of England, with historical illustrations of medieval knights, ladies, ships, and battles. The majority of his vast body of work (he estimated it was over 38,000 drawings) was not military in character, but largely passed into obscurity. Notebooks of his observations as a naturalist have survived, as well as antiquarian illustrations of civilian life. He also wrote on the history of the Seven Years' War and the natural history of dogs. Smith was of Flemish origin; he wrote the military part of Cox's Marlborough and many military and natural history books.

== The Natural History of the Human Species ==
Smith published The Natural History of the Human Species in 1848. In this book, he maintained that three fundamentally distinct human types had always existed: the Caucasian, the Mongolian and the Negro. Smith was nominally a monogenist, maintaining that the creation of humans was a single event, rather than multiple, but he was less convinced by the standard theories of the time coming from Georges-Louis Leclerc, Comte de Buffon and Georges Cuvier on interfertility and species; the book also referred to the polygenist views held by Samuel George Morton.

Smith's book was reprinted in America, where Samuel Kneeland wrote an 84-page introduction to it. Kneeland laid out evidence that he maintained supported polygenist creationism, and argued that the Bible is compatible with multiple Adams.

On retirement, Smith settled in Plymouth, joining the Plymouth Institution (now the Plymouth Athenaeum). He delivered lectures and many of his 20 volumes of MSS notes, letters, and papers were deposited in the institution. His collection was destroyed when the Plymouth Athenaeum was bombed during the Blitz in 1941.

== See also ==
- Category:Taxa named by Charles Hamilton Smith
