= Ligñon Hill =

Hill in Legazpi, Albay, Philippines

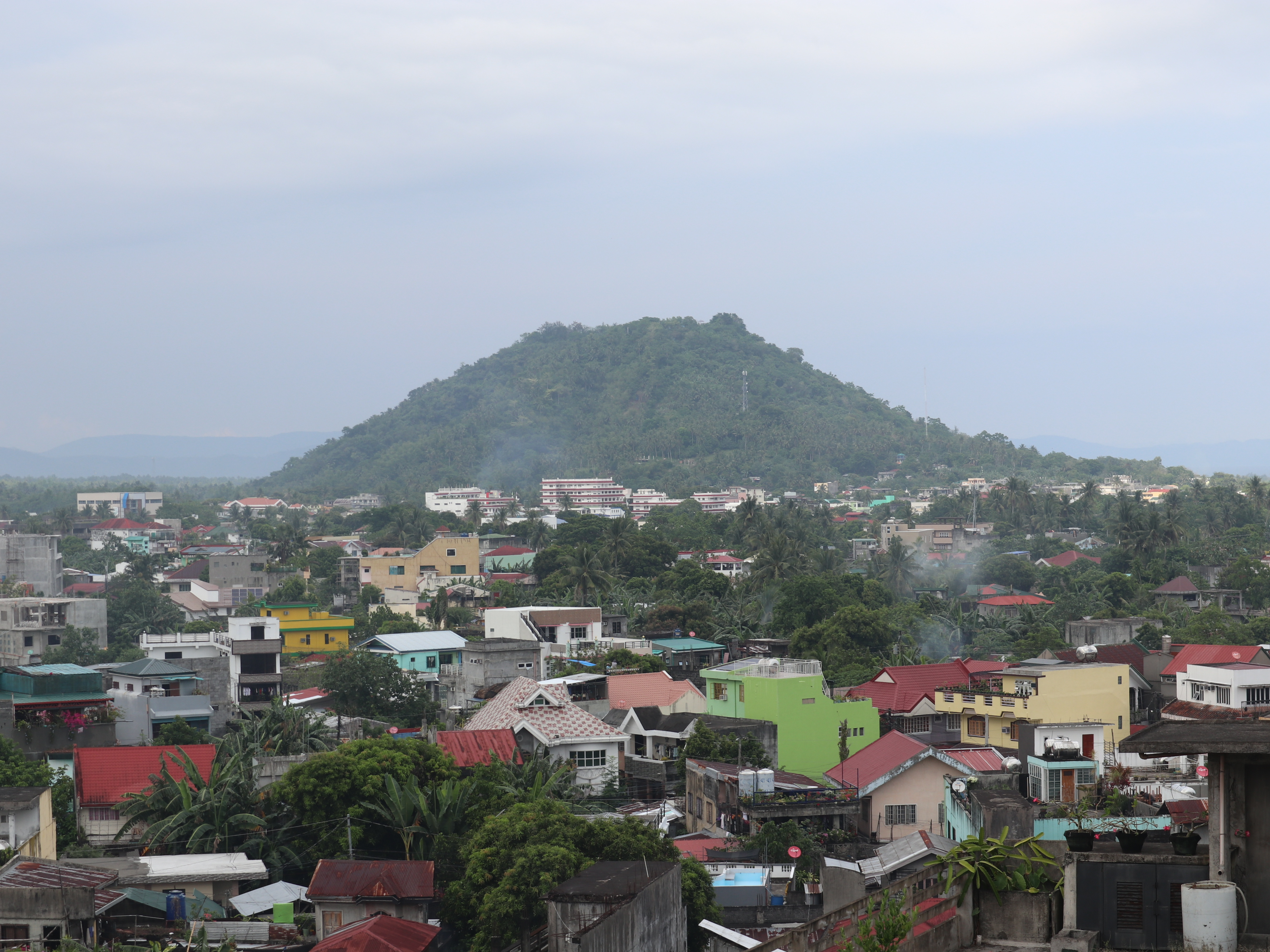
- View of Ligñon Hill from Daraga

Highest point
- Elevation: 156 m (512 ft)
- Coordinates: 13°09′39″N 123°43′46″E

Geography
- Location within Albay Location within Luzon Location within Philippines
- Location: Legazpi, Albay, Philippines

Climbing
- Easiest route: Paved road, hike

Ligñon Hill (Central Bikol: Bulod nin Ligñon) is a prominent hill in the city of Legazpi City, some 3 kilometers west of its downtown port area in Albay, Philippines. The summit rises to about 512 feet (156 meters), affording excellent views of the Mayon Volcano to the northwest and the entire city and Albay Gulf to the east. The whole site is managed by the city and provincial government, and has been designated as a nature park.

The hill is a prehistoric cinder cone near the foot of Mayon, some 12 kilometers south-southeast of the volcano's summit. It is mainly composed of dolerite and basaltic volcanic rocks. Except for Mayon Volcano, it is the highest point in the city situated next to the Legazpi Airport in barangay 41 (Bogtong) near the city's border with the municipality of Daraga. It hosts the Mayon Volcano Observatory, the central monitoring station of the Philippine Institute of Volcanology and Seismology built in 1989.

== Ligñon Hill Nature Park ==
In 2006, the park underwent a major renovation with the hilltop leased for private development under a memorandum of agreement with the Albay provincial government. The park now has a viewing deck with coin-operated telescopes, a landscaped promenade as well as restaurants and souvenir shops. Other features include a zipline and a 50-foot tunnel constructed by the Japanese during World War II. It is accessible by car via a spiral uphill road off Binitayan Road from the Legazpi Airport.

== Gallery ==
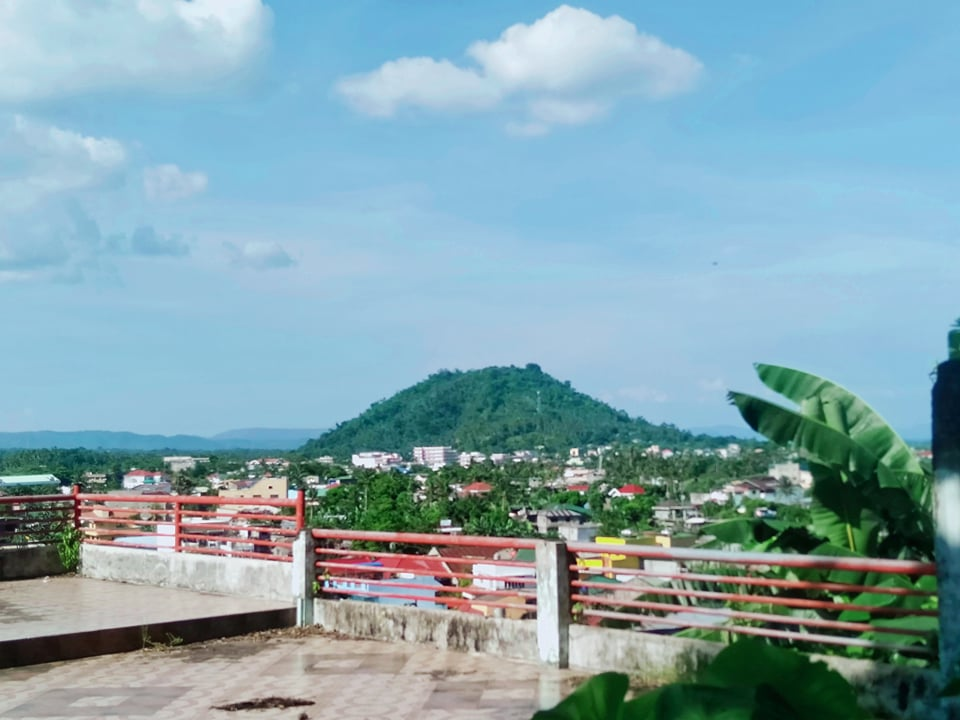
View from Daraga Church

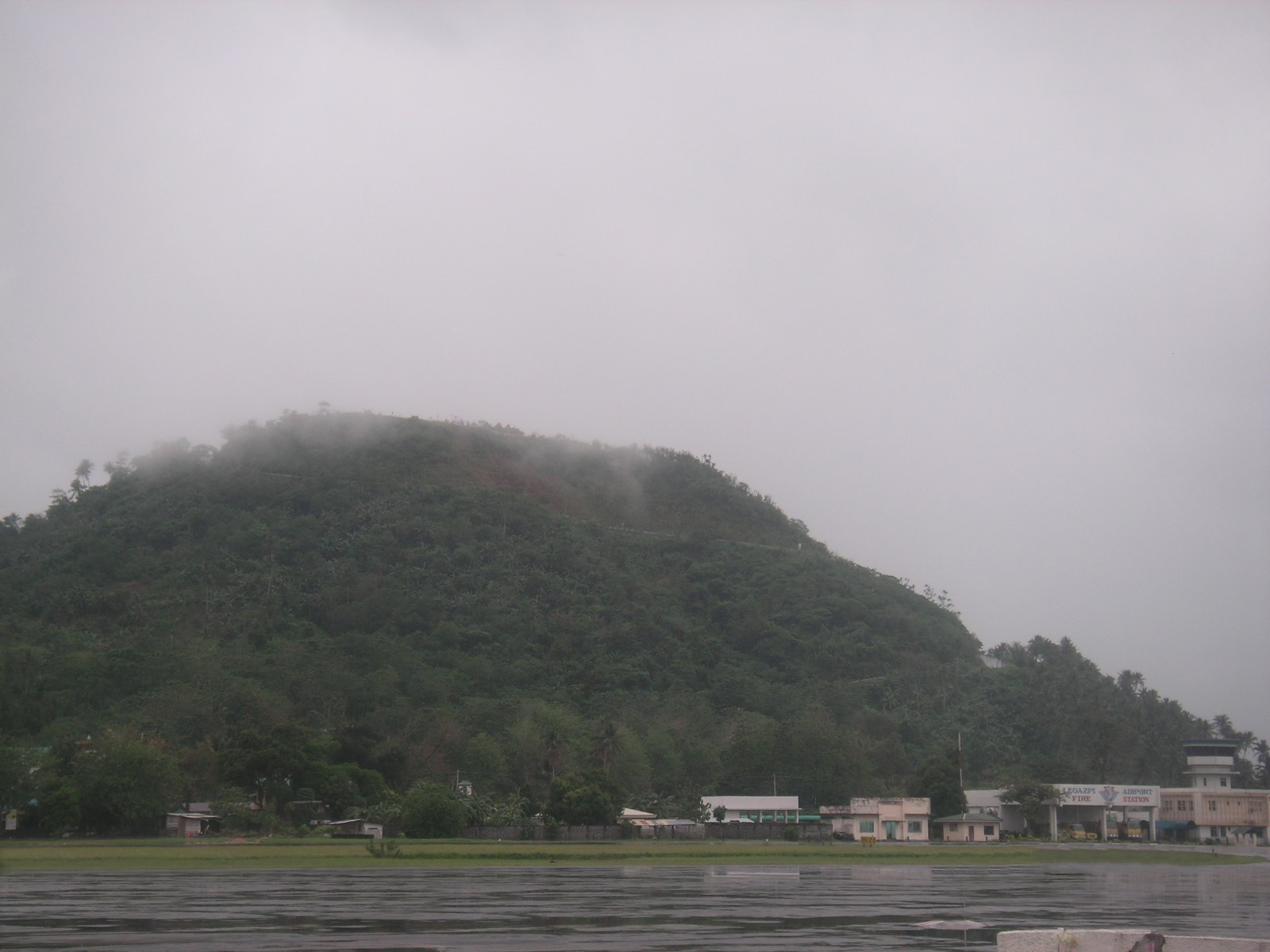
View from Legazpi Airport
