= Daragang Magayon =

Philippine mythological figure

- Gender: Female
- Region: Mount Mayon, Albay

Daragang Magayon (English: Beautiful Maiden) is the heroine that appears in the legend of Mt. Mayon in Albay, Philippines.

== Basic legend ==
Magayon was the only daughter of Makusog (strong), the tribal chief of Rawis, and Dawani (rainbow), who died shortly after giving birth to her. She grew up to be a very beautiful and sweet woman that struck the swains from faraway tribes who vied for her attention. However, none of these young men could captivate the heart of Magayon, not even the handsome but haughty Pagtuga (eruption), a hunter and the chief of the Iriga tribe. He gave fabulous gifts to Magayon, yet it was not enough to capture her attention.

One day, Daragang Magayon was bathing in the Yawa River when she slipped on the rocks. Unfortunately, she did not know how to swim. Panganoron (clouds) was passing by and saw what was happening to Daragang Magayon, so he saved her from the river. He began to court her, and after some time Magayon accepted his proposal and he received her father's blessings.

However, when Pagtuga knew about the relationship between Panganoron and Magayon, Pagtuga kidnapped Magayon's father and asked Magayon to be his wife in exchange for her father's freedom.

Panganoron knew about the situation so he asked his warriors to join him in the war with Pagtuga in the mountains. The war was fierce and breathtaking. The people and Magayon watched the war between the two of them. In the end, Panganoron killed Pagtuga. Upon his victory, Magayon ran to embrace her lover.

As Magayon ran toward her lover, an arrow shot by one of Pagtuga's warriors struck Panganoron, killing him. Magayon held Panganoron as he died in her arms. Pagtuga's warriors surrounded the lovers as Magayon took the knife from Panganoron's side and shouted his name before stabbing herself.

Magayon's father, who had witnessed their death, buried them together. As time went on, they noticed something about the place where Makusog buried the lovers: It started to form into a volcano, and when the people saw it, Makusog named it Mt. Mayon, after his daughter's name.

Some people say that it's a curse because she took her own life, but myths and legends say Magayon is the volcano and Panganoron is the clouds that surround the beautiful volcano.
