= Samuel Kneeland (naturalist) =

Late naturalist

Samuel Kneeland (1 August 1821, in Boston, Massachusetts – 27 September 1888, in Hamburg, Germany) was a naturalist of the United States.

== Biography ==
He graduated from Harvard in 1840, and got a medical degree there in 1843. At Harvard, he received the Boylston Prize for his thesis on “Contagiousness of Puerperal Fever,” and again, in 1844, for his essay on “Hydrotherapy.” Subsequently he spent two years in professional studies in Paris, and then began the practice of his profession in Boston, meanwhile serving as demonstrator of anatomy in Harvard Medical School 1845-1847, and serving as physician to the Boston Dispensary. He then passed some time in Brazil, and also visited the Lake Superior copper region.

During the American Civil War, he entered the army as acting assistant surgeon from Massachusetts, and was assigned to duty with General Ambrose Burnside. He accompanied the expedition to New Bern, North Carolina, in March 1862, and after its capture was assigned to duty at the Craven Street Hospital there, and at the hospital in Beaufort, North Carolina. In October 1862, he was commissioned surgeon of the 45th Massachusetts Regiment, and served in that capacity in New Bern until the regiment was discharged in July 1863. He then entered the corps of surgeons of volunteers, and was placed in charge, successively, of the university hospital in New Orleans, and of the marine hospital in Mobile. In 1866, he was mustered out of the service with the brevet rank of lieutenant colonel.

He returned to Boston, and became associated in the work of the Massachusetts Institute of Technology, where he held the office of instructor 1867-1869, and then professor of zoology and physiology 1869-1878, also acting as secretary of the corporation in 1866-1878, and as secretary of the faculty 1871-1878.

In 1878, Kneeland returned to literary work and lecturing, in Boston and later the Philippine Islands. He traveled extensively in search of information concerning earthquakes and volcanic phenomena, making visits to the Hawaiian Islands and to Iceland in 1874, at the time of its millennial celebration, for this purpose.

He was a member of numerous scientific societies, and held the office of secretary to the American Academy of Arts and Sciences, and to the Boston Society of Natural History.

== Polygenism ==
Charles Hamilton Smith published The Natural History of the Human Species in 1848. In this book he maintained that there had always been three fundamentally distinct human types: the Caucasian, the Mongolian and the Negro. Smith was a monogenist but with qualifications, and he referred to the polygenist theory of Samuel George Morton. When Smith's book was re-printed in America, Kneeland wrote an 84-page introduction to it. There Kneeland laid out evidence which he maintained supported polygenist creationism; and argued that the Bible is compatible with multiple Adams.

== Publications ==
In addition to editing The Annual of Scientific Discovery (1886–89), a translation of Andry's Diseases of the Heart (1847), and Smith's History of the Human Species, he wrote Science and Mechanism (1854), The Wonders of the Yosemite Valley, and of California (1871), An American in Iceland (1876), and Volcanoes and Earthquakes (1888). He contributed largely to medical literature, and was the author of many articles, mostly on zoological and medical subjects, in The American Cyclopædia.

=== Selected titles ===
- The Wonders of the Yosemite Valley, and of California (1871)
- An American in Iceland (1876)
- The Philippine Islands (1883)
- Volcanoes and Earthquakes (1888)
