= Cagraray =

Island in Albay, Philippines

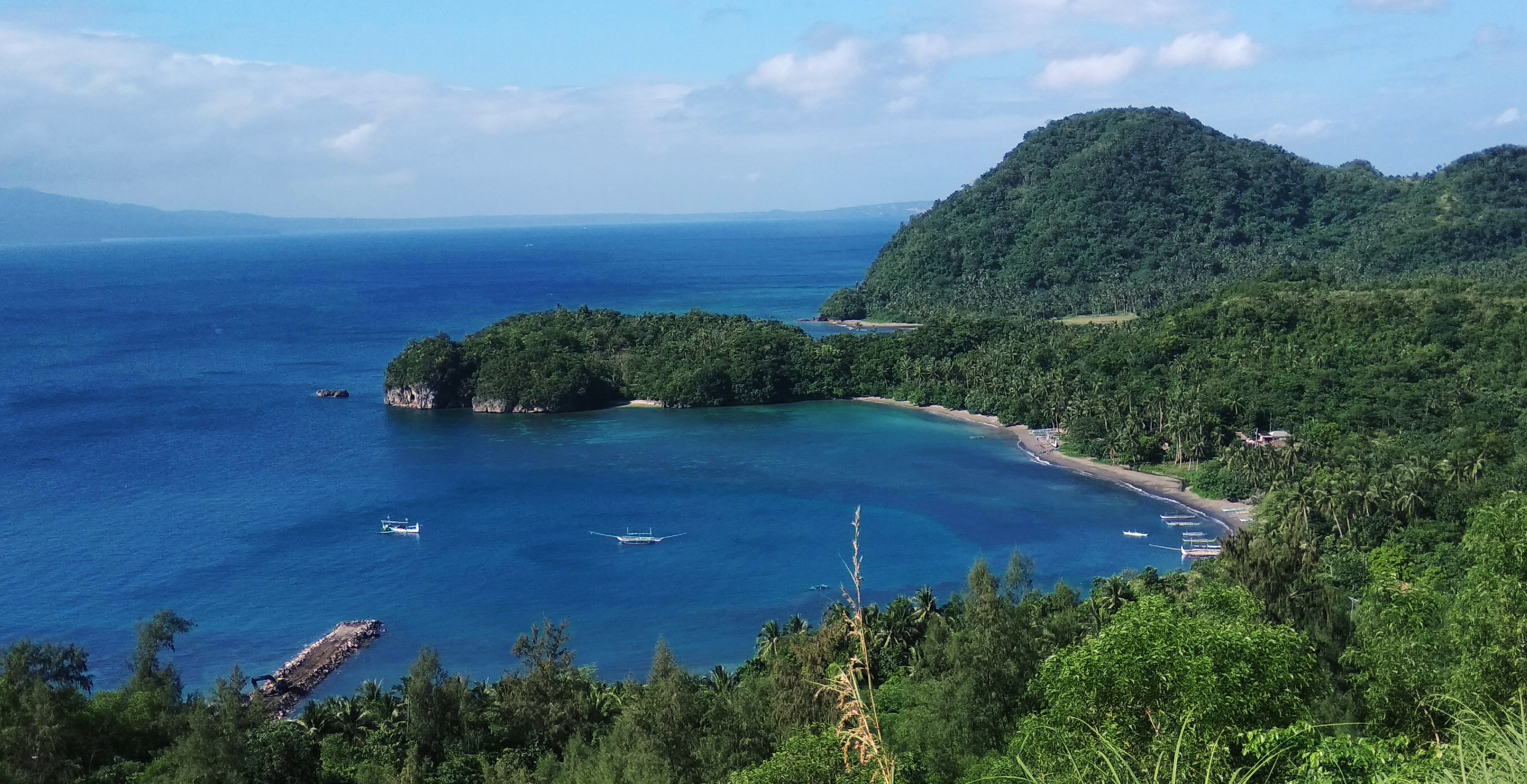

- Location within Albay Location within Luzon Location within Philippines

Geography
- Coordinates: 13°17′21″N 123°53′5″E
- Adjacent to: Albay Gulf; Lagonoy Gulf; Philippine Sea

Administration
- Philippines
- Region: Bicol Region
- Province: Albay
- Municipalities: Bacacay; Malilipot

Demographics
- Population: 24,117

Additional information

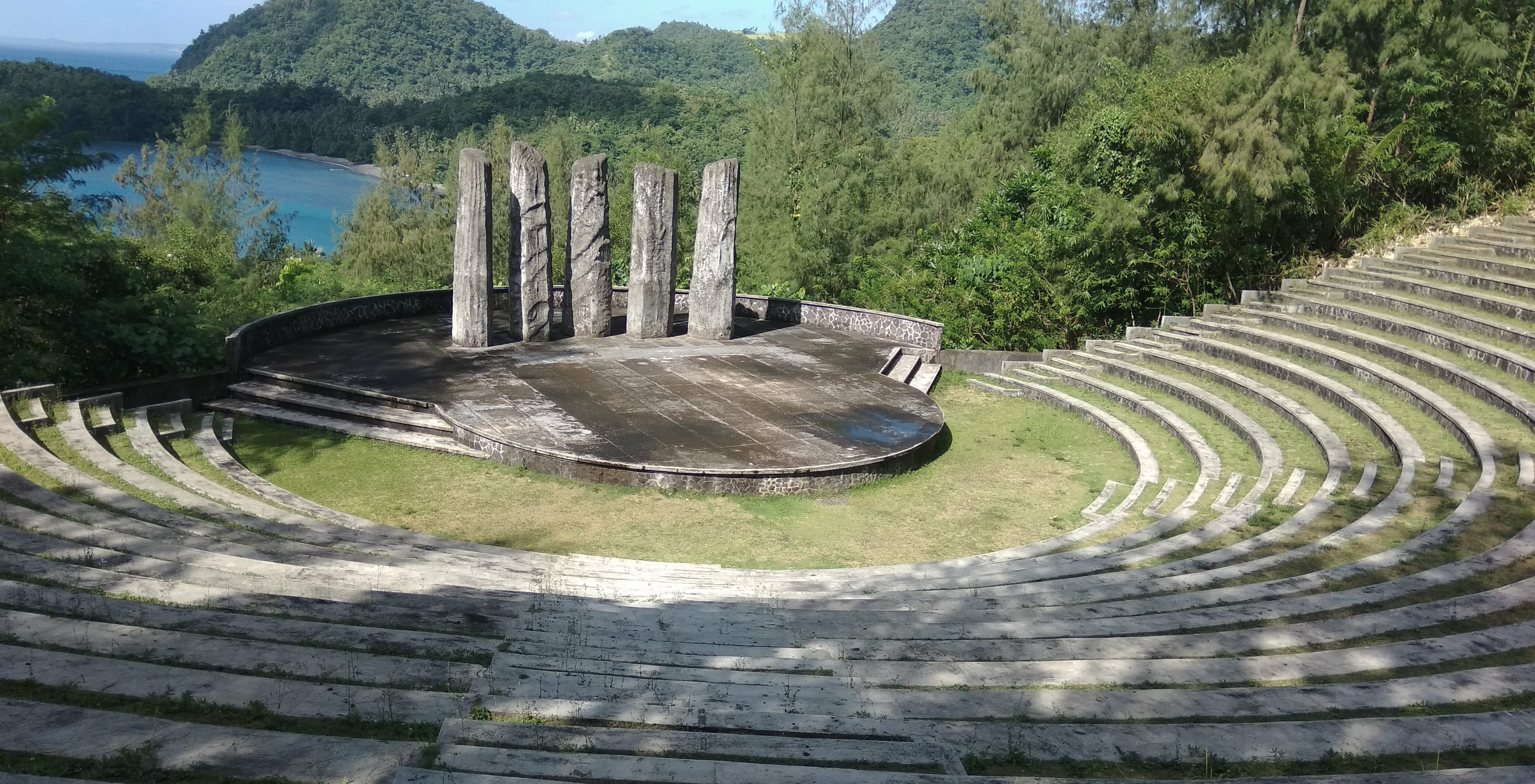
Cagraray Eco Park

Cagraray is an island located in the province of Albay in the Philippines. Except barangays San Antonio and Salvacion which belongs to Malilipot, the other barangays of Cagraray belong to the municipality of Bacacay.

The island is sandwiched between San Miguel and Batan islands, and is home to Misibis Bay, a luxury resort.

The island is a known eco-tourism spot and is home to the Mataas cave, one of Albay's only two caves open to the public. Local authorities tried to exclude it from marble mining operations in line with Republic Act 7942 or the Philippine Mining Act of 1995.

== Archaeological Sites ==
The earliest dated artifact from the island is the Mataas Shell Scoop, a bailer fashioned from the green-turban shell (Turbo marmoratus) that was excavated from a midden. Its deposit was radiocarbon-dated to between c. 2000 BCE and 300 CE, and in 2010 it was designated a National Cultural Treasure by the National Museum of the Philippines.

Various archaeological relics were found in the island from 1871 to 1881. Around 28 of the island's caves were also found to contain sacred burial jars.

== Transportation ==
A bridge spanning the narrowest portion of the Sula Channel connects the island to mainland Luzon. Access to the island is also available from its principal towns of Malilipot and Bacacay and from Tabaco.
