= Tabaco =

Component city in Albay, Philippines

- Component city
- City of Tabaco
- Tabaco Park and city hall in the background

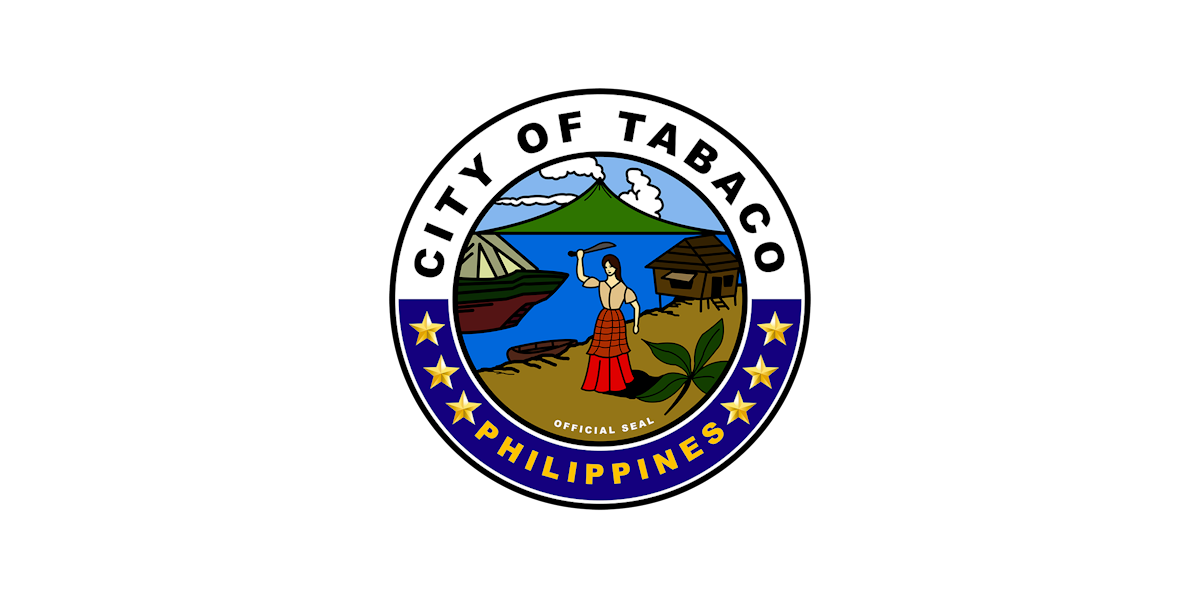
- Flag Seal
- Nickname: City of Love
- Anthem: Tabaco City Hymn
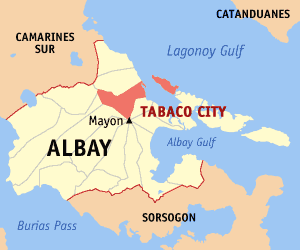
- Map of Albay with Tabaco highlighted
- Interactive map of Tabaco
- Location within the Philippines
- Coordinates: 13°21′N 123°44′E
- Country: Philippines
- Region: Bicol Region
- Province: Albay
- District: 1st district
- Founded: 1731
- Cityhood: March 24, 2001
- Barangays: 47 (see Barangays)

Government
  - Type: Sangguniang Panlungsod
  - Mayor: Reynaldo B. Bragais
  - Vice Mayor: Baby Glenda Ong-Bongao
  - Representative: Krisel Lagman
  - City Council: Members: John Gio O. Bongao; Arnaldo B. Bragais; Hector D. Rodriguez; Roderick D. Martirez; Salvacion E. Balingbing; Raul Roi B. Borejon; Lourdes B. Berces; Alfredo C. Adalla; Danilo C. Buencosejo; Julio C. Azada Chua Jr.
  - Electorate: 80,465 voters (2025)

Area
  - Total: 117.45 km^{2} (45.35 sq mi)
- Elevation: 168 m (551 ft)
- Highest elevation: 2,444 m (8,018 ft)
- Lowest elevation: 0 m (0 ft)

Population (2024 census)
  - Total: 140,779
  - Density: 1,198.6/km^{2} (3,104.4/sq mi)
  - Households: 31,415

Economy
  - Income class: 3rd city income class
  - Poverty incidence: 22.3% (2023)
  - Revenue: ₱ 979.4 million (2024)
  - Assets: ₱ 4,360 million (2024)
  - Expenditure: ₱ 843.3 million (2024)
  - Liabilities: ₱ 896.6 million (2024)

Service provider
  - Electricity: Albay Electric Cooperative (ALECO)
- Time zone: UTC+8 (PST)
- ZIP code: 4511
- PSGC: 050517000
- IDD : area code: +63 (0)52
- Native languages: Central Bikol; Tagalog
- Catholic diocese: Diocese of Legazpi
- Website: www.tabacocity.com.ph

Tabaco, officially the City of Tabaco (Central Bikol: Syudad kan Tabaco; Filipino: Lungsod ng Tabaco), is a component city in the province of Albay, Philippines. According to the 2024 census, it has a population of 140,779 people.

== Etymology ==
According to native stories, the "Legend of Tabaco" was about a lost foreigner who asked the locals what the name of the place is. However a confused and frightened native whom the lost foreigner asked did not understand what the latter was asking. The native screamed "Tabak ko!" meaning "My bolo" insinuating a person to get his tabak (presumably for defense). The lost foreigner assumed that the native understood what he asked, then thought the name of the place is Tabaco.

The Official Seal of the city was still conceived from the "Tabak Ko" legend and was officially adopted through Municipal Council Resolution No. 29 on February 23, 1966.

== History ==
=== Spanish period ===
According to the Estado Geografico Estadistico Historico written in 1805 by Father De Huerta, the recorded history of the city began in 1587 through the missionary work of the first Franciscan Fathers. In 1616, Fr. Pedro De Alcareso became the first permanent parish priest and established a church dedicated to St. John the Baptist, the patron saint of the city.

The first inhabitants settled along the seashore and engaged in fishing and crude farming. Due to the continuous attacks by the Moro raiders, the natives migrated to San Vicente and San Carlos, and started the foundation of the first poblacion in 1703, while the fishermen of the town transferred to the shores of the bay of what is now known as Barangay Cormidal. Under the administration of the first town executive, a church was built in Cormidal in 1731. Records on the elected Capitan municipal (town mayor) started only in 1731 with Martin Aguirre listed as the first mayor of Tabaco.

In 1811, a terrible typhoon called Baguiong Oguis or White Typhoon brought havoc to the town. This was followed in 1814 by the most destructive eruption of the Mayon Volcano, which showered the areas with ashes and stone. These two events rendered many residents homeless and left the fields unproductive for many years after. It took a full decade for the people to recover, at which time they built a cemetery and laid the foundation of the present church which was completed in 17 years. The 1818 census showed 3,347 native families paying tribute and they were coexisting with 225 Spanish-Filipino families.

=== American period and independence ===
The Americans landed at Tabaco on February 9, 1900, under the command of Col. Walter Howe. Despite the well-documented courage and patriotism of the Tabaqueños, the residents of Tabaco, the superior armaments and well-trained soldiers of the American army hastened its conquest of Tabaco and adjoining towns, starting the American rule in the area.

With the restoration of peace after World War II, the Tabaqueños started rebuilding their lives and their land. By the time the Philippines gained independence in 1946, Tabaco was once again a thriving town.

=== Other catastrophic events ===
Another catastrophe to hit the town was Typhoon Trix in 1952, which completely submerged Natunawan Island. A 1964 fire razed the commercial center, and in 1970, another destructive storm, Typhoon Sening, slashed through the town.

=== Cityhood ===
Then Representative Krisel Lagman-Luistro introduced House Bill No. 7851, upgrading the municipality of Tabaco into a component city of the province of Albay. Senate Bill No. 2244 was sponsored by Senators Sergio Osmeña III and Franklin Drilon as its counterpart in the Senate. The Republic Act No. 9020 converted the Municipality of Tabaco into a component city of the province of Albay. It was signed into law by President Gloria Macapagal Arroyo on February 5, 2001. The municipality was finally converted into a city after the plebiscite conducted on March 24, 2001.

== Local Government ==
=== Elected officials ===
2022–2025 Tabaco City Officials
Position	Name	Party
Mayor	Cielo Krisel Lagman-Luistro ‹›	Liberal
Vice Mayor	Nestor San Pablo ‹›	Liberal
Councilors	Luis Renir Burce +	Liberal
Councilors	Salvacion E. Balingbing ‹›	Liberal
Councilors	Carol Ziga +	Lakas
Councilors	John Gio O. Bongao ‹›	Liberal
Councilors	Insit B. Tanggo +	Liberal
Councilors	Arnold C. Onrubia +	Liberal
Councilors	Dionisio Ragodon Jr. +	Liberal
Councilors	Arnaldo B. Bragais ‹›	Liberal
Councilors	Roderick Martirez +	Liberal
Councilors	Lourdes Belangel-Berces ‹›	Kusog Bikolandia
Ex Officio City Council Members
ABC President	Rogelio Burce (Bombon)	Nonpartisan
SK Federation President	Vince B. Bien (Cormidal)	Nonpartisan

Legend
1. A + indicates that the official is elected for the first term
2. A ♯ indicates that the official is re-elected to a higher position
3. A ‹› indicates that the official is re-elected to the same position

=== Past municipal administrators ===
Spanish Era (1731–1898)
Inclusive years	Gobernadorcillo
1731	Don Martin Aguirre
1732	Don Gabriel Tabad
1733	Don Pascual Payante
1734	Don Francisco Lomalag
1735	Don Bartolome Daguinot
1736	Don Pedro Gauban
1737	Don Antonio Mabangquiray
1738-1739	Don Gabriel Tabad
1740-1741	Don Antonio Mabangquiray
1742	Don Felipe Tiangco
1743	Don Gabriel Tabad
1744	Don Antonio Mabangquiray
1745	Don Sebastian Ortiz
1746-1750	Don Juan Flores
1751	Don Gabriel Tabad
1752-1753	Don Juan Flores
1754-1755	Don Manuel dela Cruz
1756-1757	Don Hilario Gobarat
1758	Don Pedro Manlagñit
1759	Don Vicente Geronimo
1760-1762	Unknown
1763-1765	Don Jose Bacilio
1766	Don Pedro Barajadia
1767	Don Jose dela Torre
1768	Don Felipe Poblete
1769	Don Pedro Barajadia
1770	Don Juan Gonzales
1771	Don Lorenzo Magdaraog
1772	Don Juan Gonzales
1773	Don Jose dela Torre
1774	Don Jose dela Virgen
1775-1776	Don Pedro Barajadia
1777-1779	Don Manuel dela Cruz
1780	Don Pedro Esteban
1781	Don Manuel dela Cruz
1782	Don Pedro Esteban
1783	Don Felix Geronimo
1784	Don Felix Mendez
1785	Don Andres Flores
1786	Don Cornelio Delos Flores
1787	Don Esteban Santelices
1788	Don Jorge Geronimo
1789	Don Cayetano de la Cruz
1790 - 1791	Don Jorge Geronimo
1792	Don Luis Amaro
1793	Don Silvestre Valentin
1794	Don Andres Flores
1795	Don Evaristo Quintin Geronimo
1796	Don Jose Fermin
1797	Don Jose Madriaga
1798	Don Felix Geronimo
1799	Don Jorge Geronimo
1800	Don Felix Geronimo
1801	Don Pablo Geronimo
1802	Don Manuel Bautista
1803	Don Gervacio Clemente
1804	Don Felix Geronimo
1805	Don Pedro Atanacio
1806	Don Jorge Geronimo
1807	Don Gervacio Clemente
1808	Don Bartolome Jorge
1809	Don Gervacio Clemente
1810	Don Francisco de la Torre
1811	Don Evaristo Quintin Geronimo
1812	Don Gervacio Clemente
1813	Don Evaristo Quintin Geronimo
1814	Don Felix Geronimo
1815	Don Bernardino delos Santos
1816	Don Juan de Dios
1817	Don Martin Luciano
1818	Don Bernardink delos Santos
1819	Don Esteban Flores
1820	Don Luis Beltran
1821	Don Eustaquio de Vera
1822	Don Felix Soriano
1823	Don Sixto Mariano
1824	Don Luis Silvestre
1825	Don Sebastian Sales
1826	Don Eustaquio de Vera and Rodrigo de Villa
1827	Don Manuel de Mesa
1828	Don Bernardino delos Santos
1829	Don Vicente Fermin
1830	Don Luciano Geronimo
1831	Don Silvestre Sotero
1832	Don Pedro Navarro
1833	Don Silvestre Rodocendo
1834	Don Agapito Flores
1835	Don Antonio del Castillo
1836	Don Eustaquio de Vera
1837	Don Jose Romano
1838	Don Leon del Castillo
1839	Don Jose Rodocendo
1840	Don Bernardino delos Santos
1841	Don Juan del Rosario
1842	Don Felipe del Rosario
1843	Don Santiago del Rosario
1844	Don Antonio del Castillo
1845	Don Bernardino de Vera
1846	Don Silvestre Bonifacio
1847	Don Luis Imperial
1848	Don Crisanto dela Virgen
1849	Don Antonio delos Santos
1850	Don Balbino Corral
1851	Don Joaquin Bufi
1852	Don Antonio Celon
1853	Don Ceferino Borbe
1854	Don Ramon Baldonado
1855	Don Placido Bongon
1856	Don Gavino Corral
1857	Don Ramon Baldonado
1858	Don Lauriano Brucelas
1859	Don Antonio Celon
1860	Don Pedro Calla
1861	Don Calixto Bono
1862	Don Tomas Borondia
1863-1864	Don Martin Bonafe
1865-1866	Don Saturnino Sagubia
1867-1870	Don Andres Ordoñes
1871-1872	Don Apolinario Brucelas
1873	Don Fausto Bombase
1874	Don Juan Bien
1875-1876	Don Rodocendo Zamora
1877-1880	Don Custodio Bobis
1881-1882	Don Mariano Villanueva
1883-1884	Don Domingo Bardonada
1885-1886	Don Valentin Brimbuela
1887-1888	Don Eriberto Berces
1889	Don Mariano Villanueva
1890-1891	Don Toribio Poblete
1892	Don Isidro Santillan
1893-1894	Don Francisco Almonte
1895-1898	Don Agustin Zamora

Republica Filipina (1898-1901)
Inclusive years	Municipal president	Municipal vice-president
August 14, 1898 - June, 1901	Manuel Medina (Appointed by Gen. Emilio Aguinaldo)	Timoteo Bueno

American rule (1900–1941)
Inclusive years	Portrait	Municipal president	Municipal vice-president	Notes
1900		Toribio Poblete		
1901		Manuel Medina		
1902-1903		Agustin Zamora		
1904–1905		Juan Bongon		
1906-1908		T. Buenconsejo		
1909 – 1911		Agustin Zamora		
1912 – 1913		Juan Bongon		
1914 - 1916		Calixto Brucelas		
1917 - 1921		Victoriano Poblete		
1922		Juan Bongon		
1923		Calixto Brucelas		
1924-1926		Victoriano Poblete		
1927 - 1934		Bernardino Santillan		
1935 - 1937		Victor Bocaya		
1938 - 1941		Bernardino Santillan		

Japanese Occupation (1941–1945)
Inclusive years	Portrait	Municipal Mayor
1941 - 1943		Felipe Manalang (Japanese Appointed)
1943 - 1944		Pacifico Buenconsejo (Japanese Appointed)
1944 (3 months)		Conrado Bootan (Japanese Appointed)
1944 (3 months)		Emiterio Manga (Japanese Appointed)
1944 (3 months)		Pacifico Buenconsejo (Japanese Appointed)
1945 - August 1945		Apolonio Bocalbos (Japanese Appointed)

Post-War Period (1945–present)
Inclusive years	Portrait	Municipal Mayor	Municipal Vice Mayor	SK Federation President	ABC President	Remarks
September 29, 1945 – June 13, 1946		Brigido Bobis	Tomas Cabiles (Sept. 29, 1945 - 1946)			Acting Mayor, Appointed by Pres. Sergio Osmeña
June 14, 1946 – 1947		Andres Rios				Appointed by Pres. Manuel Roxas
1947 – December 30, 1951		Tomas Cabiles				
January 1, 1952 – December 30, 1955		Apolonio Bocalbos				
January 1, 1956 - December 30, 1959		Tomas Cabiles				
January 1, 1960 - December 30, 1965		Antonio Berces				
January 1, 1965 - December 30, 1967		Apolonio Buban				
January 1, 1968 – 1975		Leticia Berces				First Female Mayor in Tabaco and in all Albay province
1976 – 1980		Salvador Moran				OIC
1981 - March 1986		Jaime Berces				
1986		Jaime Bobis				Appointed Mayor by Pres. Corazon Aquino
1986 (2 months) and 1987 (2 months)		Johny Rocha				Appointed Mayor by Pres. Corazon Aquino
1987 – June 30, 1998		Antonio O. Demetriou				
June 30, 1998 – June 30, 2007		Atty. Alex A. Burce				
June 30, 2007 – June 30, 2013		Cielo Krisel B. Lagman-Luistro	Reynaldo B. Bragais			
June 30, 2013 - June 30, 2016		Maria Josefa V. Demetriou	Reynaldo B. Bragais			
June 30, 2016 – June 30, 2025		Cielo Krisel B. Lagman-Luistro	Nestor T. San Pablo			
Term Starts on June 30, 2025		Reynaldo B. Bragais	Baby Glenda O. Bongao			Mayor Elect

== Geography ==
The City of Tabaco is located on the eastern coast of Albay province with an area of 117.14 km^{2} (45.23 sq mi). The terrain in the poblacion or town center of Tabaco is generally flat with the highest elevation at around 5 m (16 ft). The northwestern portion reaches 400 m (1,300 ft) above sea level. The city's southwest boundary reaches all the way to the top of Mayon at an elevation of 2,462 m (8,077 ft).

Tabaco is one of the three component cities of the province, along with Legazpi and Ligao. The mainland part of the city is bordered by the town of Malinao to the north, the towns of Polangui and Oas to the west, Ligao to the southwest, Malilipot town to the southeast, and Lagonoy Gulf to the east. The symmetric Mayon Volcano, the most active volcano in the Philippines, lies south of the city. Tabaco is one of the eight towns and cities that share jurisdiction on the volcano, dividing the peak like slices of a pie when viewed from above. It is 25 kilometres (16 mi) from Legazpi City and 552 kilometres (343 mi) from Manila.

The island of San Miguel, the westernmost of the four main islands in Lagonoy Gulf, falls under the jurisdiction of Tabaco. Five of the barangays of the city are located on the island for a total of 47 barangays composing the city.

Total forest area in Tabaco is 2,572 ha (6,360 acres).

=== Climate ===
Climate data for Tabaco
Month	Jan	Feb	Mar	Apr	May	Jun	Jul	Aug	Sep	Oct	Nov	Dec	Year
Mean daily maximum °C (°F)	27 (81)	27 (81)	28 (82)	30 (86)	31 (88)	30 (86)	29 (84)	29 (84)	29 (84)	29 (84)	28 (82)	27 (81)	29 (84)
Mean daily minimum °C (°F)	22 (72)	22 (72)	23 (73)	24 (75)	25 (77)	25 (77)	25 (77)	25 (77)	25 (77)	24 (75)	24 (75)	23 (73)	24 (75)
Average precipitation mm (inches)	138 (5.4)	83 (3.3)	74 (2.9)	50 (2.0)	108 (4.3)	165 (6.5)	202 (8.0)	165 (6.5)	190 (7.5)	186 (7.3)	188 (7.4)	183 (7.2)	1,732 (68.3)
Average rainy days	16.8	11.9	13.5	13.8	20.5	25.2	27.4	26.2	26.1	24.7	20.7	18.5	245.3
Source: Meteoblue

The City of Tabaco belongs to the Type II climate of the Philippines. It is characterized by no distinct dry season but with a very pronounced maximum rainfall from November to January.

The area has pronounced warmness and humidity throughout the year with a mean temperature of 26.0 °C (78.8 °F) and a humidity range up to 80%. February is the coldest month with a low of 21.0 °C (69.8 °F). The warmest temperature is experienced during May with a mean temperature of 27.0 °C (80.6 °F).

=== Barangays ===
Tabaco City is politically subdivided into 47 barangays. Each barangay consists of puroks and some have sitios.

There are sixteen coastal barangays, five on the island of San Miguel and eleven in the mainland of the city. San Pedro became a barrio in 1952.

- Agnas (San Miguel Island)
- Bacolod
- Bangkilingan
- Bantayan
- Baranghawon
- Basagan
- Basud (Barangay 1 Poblacion)
- Bogñabong
- Bombon (Barangay 2 Poblacion)
- Bonot
- Buang
- Buhian
- Cabagñan
- Cobo
- Comon
- Cormidal
- Divino Rostro (Barangay 3 Poblacion)
- Fatima
- Guinobat
- Hacienda (San Miguel Island)
- Magapo
- Mariroc
- Matagbac
- Oras
- Oson
- Panal
- Pawa
- Pinagbobong
- Quinale Cabasan (Barangay 4 Poblacion)
- Quinastillojan
- Rawis (San Miguel Island)
- Sagurong (San Miguel Island)
- Salvacion
- San Antonio
- San Carlos
- San Isidro
- San Juan (Barangay 5 Poblacion)
- San Lorenzo
- San Ramon
- San Roque
- San Vicente
- Santo Cristo (Barangay 6 Poblacion)
- Sua-Igot
- Tabiguian
- Tagas
- Tayhi (Barangay 7 Poblacion)
- Visita (San Miguel Island)

== Demographics ==
Population census of Tabaco
Year	Pop.	±% p.a.
1903	21,946	—
1918	24,812	+0.82%
1939	29,957	+0.90%
1948	33,209	+1.15%
1960	46,416	+2.83%
1970	60,572	+2.69%
1975	65,254	+1.50%
1980	72,634	+2.17%
1990	85,697	+1.67%
1995	96,993	+2.35%
2000	107,166	+2.16%
2007	123,513	+1.98%
2010	125,083	+0.46%
2015	133,868	+1.30%
2020	140,961	+1.09%
2024	140,779	−0.03%
Source: Philippine Statistics Authority

=== Language and dialect ===
Bikol is the primary language in Tabaco and the region. The majority of people speak the Tabaqueño Dialect derived from Coastal Bicol. Although Bicolano Viejo is also spoken, it has fallen out of mainstream use and has since been reduced to the status of sociolect as only very few members of Tabaco's oldest and more affluent families still use it. As in most parts of the Philippines, Filipino and English are spoken and afforded official language status. Spanish, Hiligaynon, Cebuano, Arabic, Cantonese, Hokkien and Mandarin are also spoken owing to Tabaco's significant migrant and mestizo populations.

=== Religion ===
Christianity is the predominant religion with Roman Catholicism with the most number of practitioners. Other Christian denominations are also present in the city like Protestants, Baptist, Philippine Independent Church, United Pentecostal Church, Evangelical Christian and Iglesia ni Cristo. Islam, Mormonism, Hinduism, Jainism, Wicca, Modern Paganism and Buddhism also have followers in the city.

== Economy ==
Poverty incidence of Tabaco (%)

Source: Philippine Statistics Authority

=== Agriculture ===
Its economy is still heavily dependent on agriculture. Major crops include rice, corn, cacao, pili, root crops, vegetables, coconuts and abacá. Poultry and livestock raising as well as aquaculture and fishing are very much alive.

=== International seaport ===
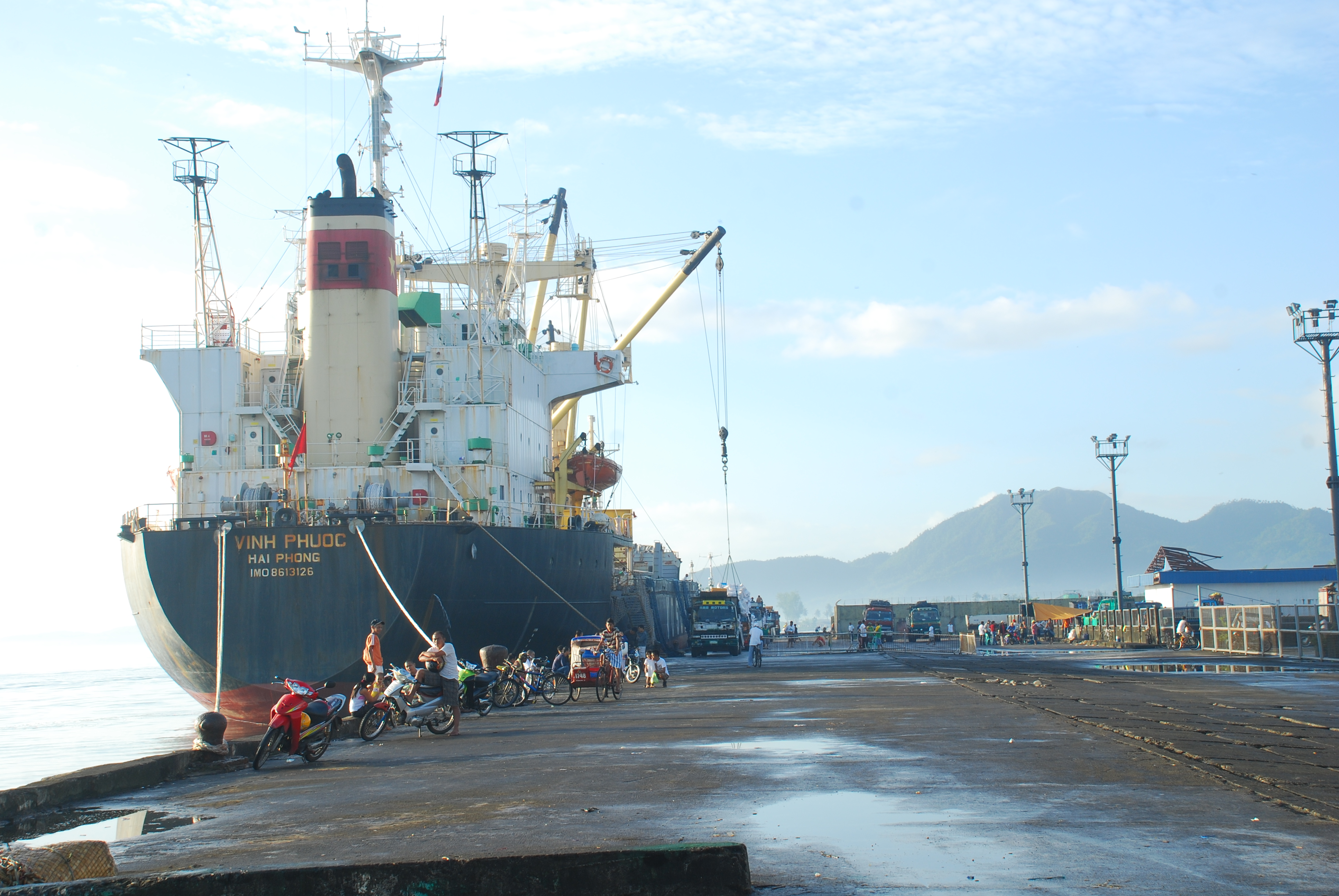
Port of Tabaco

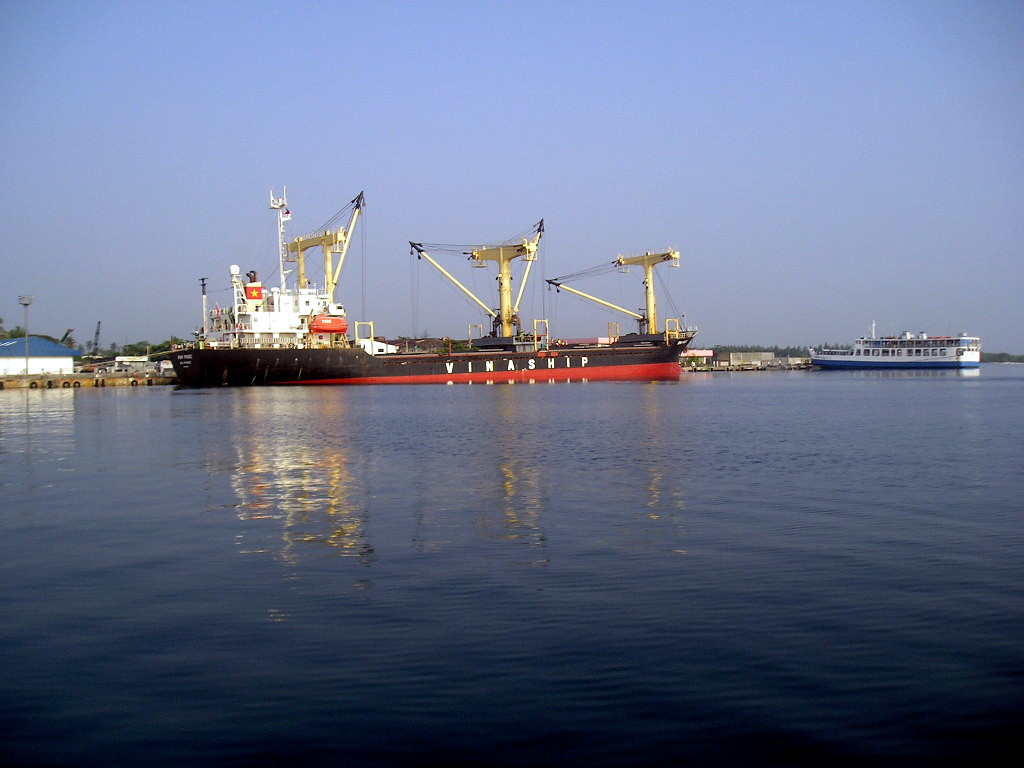
Tabaco International Seaport in 2007

Tabaco is growing and has a commercial center and port area. The city has the sole International Seaport in the region.

=== Local fishport ===
Situated in Barangay Fatima and San Roque. Which serves as the trading area of products (fisheries, livestock, variety of fruits and vegetables, woods and charcoals), from neighboring islands in San Miguel, Bacacay, and Rapu-Rapu.

=== Other industries ===
LCC Mall Tabaco

- Woodcraft. Wood furniture and accessories manufacturing.
- Metal Craft. Tabak (bolo knife) manufacturing or cutlery, scissors, razors, farm implements, window grills, iron gates and tricycle sidecars
- Rattan Craft. Furniture and fixtures made from rattan.
- Ceramics Industry. Hollow blocks, toilet bowls, floor tiles, and reinforced concrete pipes.
- Hat & Mat weaving from Paraguay leaves.
- Ship Repair and Building. Dry dock facility is available in Barangay Salvacion.
- Padyak (pedicab), Trucks, Bus and AUV Manufacturing (body building)

== Tourism ==
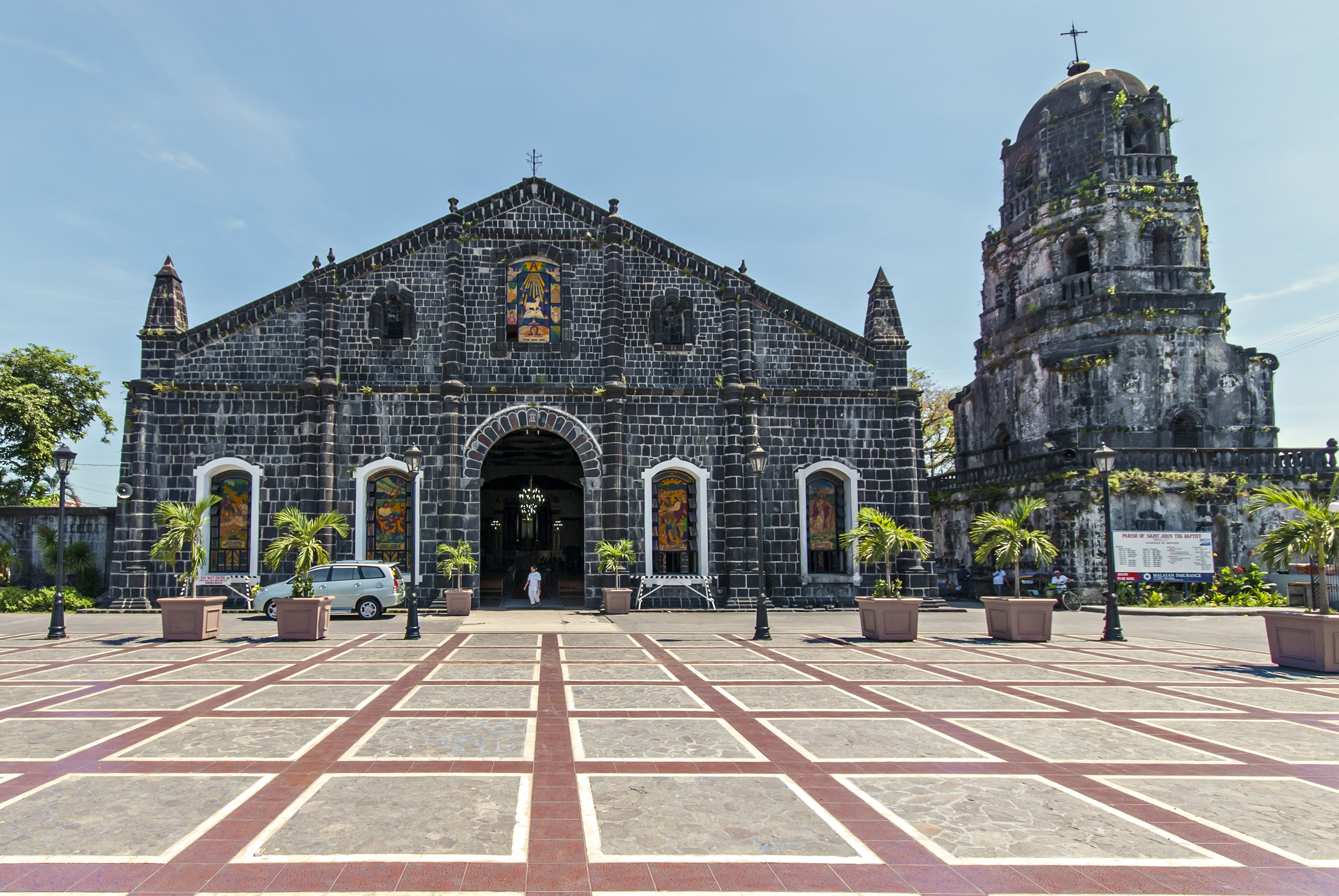
Saint John the Baptist Parish Church

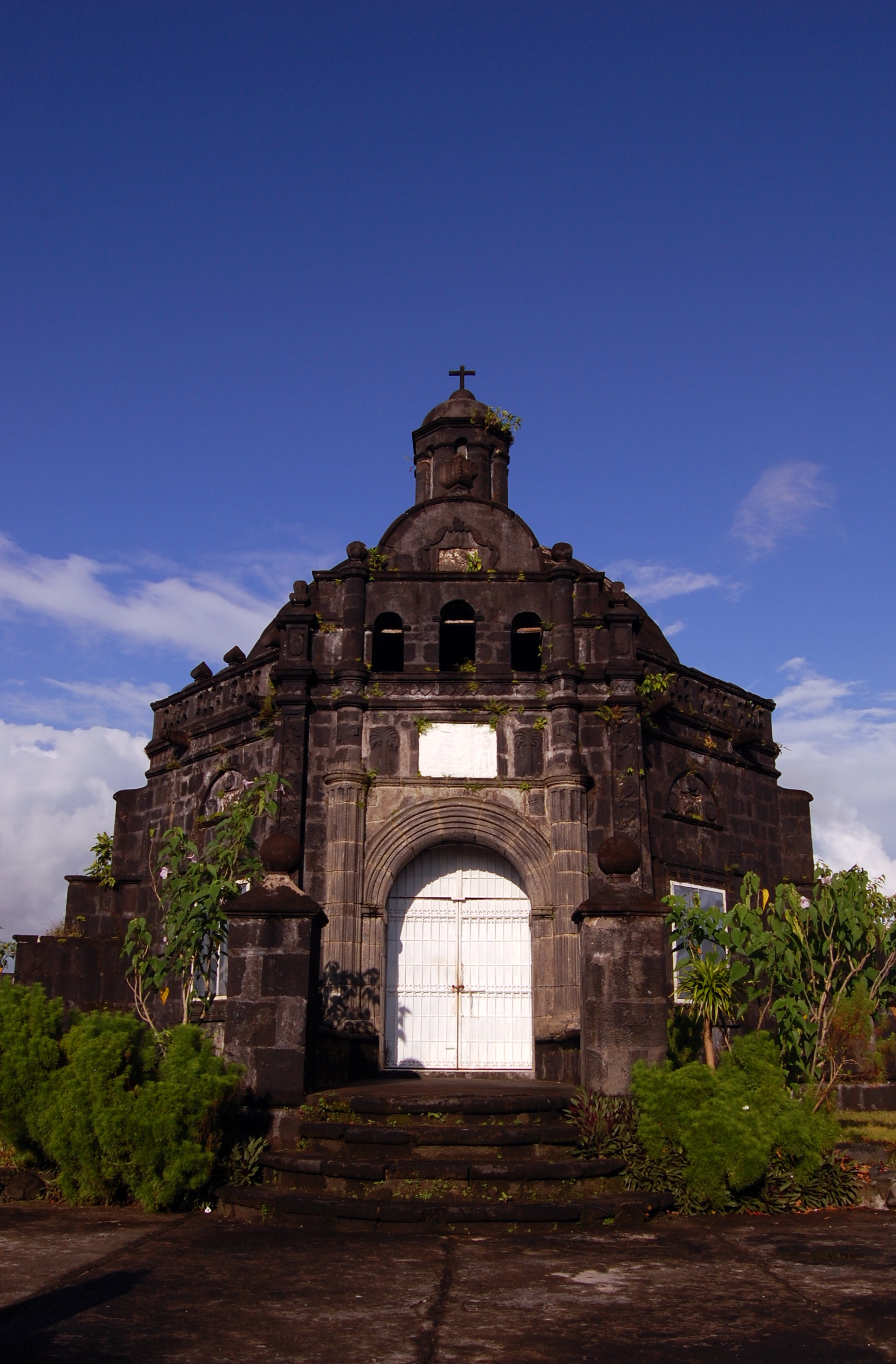
Tabaco Cemetery Chapel

=== Places of interest ===
The Church of San Juan Bautista in San Juan, Tabaco City, is one of the most impressive religious structures in the province of Albay. The construction of the present church started in 1750. It was designated a National Historic Landmark by PD. 260 on August 1, 1973.

Beaches and resorts:

- Dhio Endheka Spring Resort in Mayon Crossing, Buang
- Hacienda Long Beach Resort in Barangay Hacienda in San Miguel Island
- Jennifer's Garden and Resort in Barangay Bantayan
- Natunawan Cove
- Punta Island Beach Resort in Barangay Rawis in San Miguel Island
- San Lorenzo Beach in Barangay San Lorenzo
- Borcels Nature Springs in Barangay Marriroc
- Cassandra Spring Resort in Barangay Pinagbobong (near Borcels Nature Springs)
- Villa Azon in Barangay Matagbac
- KC Land Park in Cabangan

Historical:

- Angela Manalang Gloria Ancestral House at Quinale

Educational:

- Mayon Planetarium and Science Park in Buang is a planetarium with library, the virtual room, a mini-museum and an audiovisual hall.
- San Miguel Island Marine Fishery Reserve located in Sagurong, San Miguel Island.

Institutions:

- Tabaco Port (International Port of Entry)
- Mayon Skyline Hotel and Convention Center in Buang. Formerly known as Mayon Resthouse, it is located on the northern slope of Mayon Volcano.

=== Events and festival ===
- Charter Day or the Founding Anniversary of Tabaco as a city is celebrated yearly on March 24.
- Tabak Festival is a week-long celebration showcasing the city's cutlery industry. It is held the third week of March culminating with the founding anniversary of Tabaco.
- City Fiesta. In honor of the patron saint of Tabaco, St. John the Baptist, the city Fiesta is celebrated on June 24.

== Transportation ==
=== Roads ===
Roads in Tabaco are classified as follows:

- National roads – 20 kilometres (12 mi)
- Provincial roads – 48.47 kilometres (30.12 mi)
- Municipal roads – 10.7855 kilometres (6.7018 mi)
- Barangay roads – 74.826 kilometres (46.495 mi)

=== Airport ===
The nearest airport is in Daraga – Bicol International Airport – about 41.7 kilometres (25.9 mi) from Tabaco City.

=== Seaport ===
The Port of Tabaco City is one of the ports of entry open to overseas shipping in the province of Albay. It also serves as a passenger and cargo movement facility to the islands of San Miguel, Cagraray, Batan and Rapu-Rapu as well as the provinces of Catanduanes and Camarines Sur. The main Sea Transportation operators in the port are:

- M/V Eugenia
- M/V Regina Calixta 2, 3 and 4

=== Buses ===
There is regular transportation to and from Manila and to the other main cities in the Bicol Region.

=== Others ===
- There are 632 Registered motorized tricycles with routes to different barangays and neighboring municipalities.
- There are over 2,000 Pedicabs for transportation within the poblacion.
- There are several jeepney routes around the city or anywhere in the province.

== Education ==
=== Secondary school ===
- Bantayan National High School
- Bogñabong National High School
- Comon National High School
- Daniel B. Peña Memorial College Foundation
- Hacienda National High School
- Mariroc National High School
- San Antonio National High School
- San Isidro National High School
- San Miguel National High School
- San Lorenzo National High School
- St. Gregory the Great Seminary
- Catholic Central School (CCS)
- Tabaco National High School
- Tabaco Pei Ching School

=== Tertiary, vocational, technical schools ===
- Amando Cope College, School of Nursing in Baranghawon
- Bicol Maritime Technical Colleges Foundation on Rizal St.
- Bicol University Tabaco Campus in Tayhi
- Carolyn Institute of Technology Incorporated in San Roque
- Computer Communication Development Institute on Gen. Luna St.
- Daniel B. Peña Memorial College Foundation on Ziga Ave.
- Dr. Carlos S. Lanting College, Inc. / Casaul Technological College, Inc. in Tomas Cabiles Ave.
- Informatics Computer Institute is on the corner of Ziga Ave. and Karangahan Blvd.,
- Pacific Technical Institute in Tagas
- Perpetual Help Paramedical College in Tagas
- Polytechnic Institute of Tabaco in Panal
- Tabaco College on Tomas Cabiles Ave.

== Public services ==
Waste disposal

In dealing with solid waste management, the City of Tabaco has adopted the usual means of dumping garbage in an open-pit landfill. Garbage is collected from each barangay in the Poblacion daily. The city has four garbage trucks and four compactors to ensure that the garbage is collected and disposed of in the waste disposal site located at Pinagbobong, about 4-kilometre (2.5 mi) distance from the central business district.

Fire protection

- The Tabaco City Fire Station, Bureau of Fire Protection is located on Ziga Ave. A total of fifteen fire officers serve in the local fire department, including the City Fire Marshall.
- The local mall (LCC) has its volunteer fire brigade that helps the fire department in extending its services to the residents of Tabaco.
- Tabaco Chinese-Filipino Volunteer Fire Brigade.

=== Police and law enforcement ===
Tabaco Police Force
The Philippine National Police (PNP) Tabaco City Station is staffed by five police officers and seventy-five police NCOs (non-commissioned officers), located at Llorente St., at the back of the City Hall, headed by Police Chief Superintendent Jose Lipa Capinpin. Police headquarters is now located in front of the Central Terminal, Pawa, Tabaco City

PNP CID Regional Office
Assisting the city police in its drive against criminality is the PNP Criminal Investigation & Detection Group Tabaco Regional Sub-Office. The station is under the direct command of the Provincial Officer and serves the first district of Albay.

Tabaco City Jail
The Tabaco City District Jail is situated at Burac St., San Lorenzo, Tabaco City, 3 km (1.9 mi) away from the city proper. The jail structure is composed of six (6) operation cells, staffed by two BJMP officers and twenty non-officer ranks.

=== Utilities ===
Power

Two power companies provide electricity to the city.

- Albay Power Electric Cooperative inc (ALECO) in Matagbac, Tabaco City serves 35 of the 47 barangays of the town or 74% of the city.
- ASCO-Tabaco, located in A.A. Berces Street, San Juan, Tabaco City serves the rest of the city.
- The office of Albay Power Electric Cooperative in Tabaco City is Located in J.B Berces street/Rizal street, Bacolod/Tayhi Tabaco City.

Water

Water supply is managed by the Tabaco Water District (TAWAD) located in Karangahan Blvd. Tabaco City. Its present service area encompasses the Poblacion and 21 other barangays, serving about 25,000 people in 2,933 households presently connected to the system.

== Notable personalities ==
- Henry Omaga-Diaz, journalist
- Thomas Franco Rodriguez or Tomás, member of Filipino pop boy band, Alamat and finalist, Pinoy Big Brother: 737 teen edition
- Blissanda James Marites, singer
- Lian Espartinez, Football Player
- Miguel Barsaga, Football Player
- Liam Tang, Basketball Player
