= Rapu-Rapu Island =

Island in Albay, Philippines

- Location within Albay Location within Luzon Location within Philippines

Geography
- Coordinates: 13°12′10″N 124°8′22″E
- Adjacent to: Albay Gulf; Lagonoy Gulf; Philippine Sea

Administration
- Philippines
- Region: Bicol Region
- Province: Albay
- Municipality: Rapu-Rapu

Demographics
- Population: 13,224 (as of 2020)

Additional information

Rapu-Rapu Island is an island in the Philippine municipality of Rapu-Rapu in the province of Albay. The island is situated between Lagonoy Gulf, Albay Gulf, and the Pacific Ocean. Mostly rural, the island's residents engage in fishing, farming, and mining.

== Geography ==
Rapu-Rapu lies within a larger group of islands including Catanduanes, Cagraray, and Batan. To the north is Lagonoy Gulf, and to the west is Albay Gulf. The Pacific Ocean lies to the east.

The Rapu-Rapu river runs slightly to the west of the island's midpoint.

Mining activities on the island have polluted some of its waterways.

=== Geology ===
Rapu-Rapu lies in what is known as the Western Caramoan Structural Unit, which contains ophiolite and volcanic rocks from the Cretaceous period, limestone from the middle Eocene, carbonate and sedimentary rocks from the upper Oligocene–Pliocene, and volcanic rocks from the Pliocene–Quaternary. The island itself is made up of two terranes, the Malobago terrane taking up two-third of the island to the east and the Pitogo terrane to the west. Malobago is more metamorphic, predominantly chlorine quartz schist, while Pitogo has more ophiolite. These are separated by a NNE-SSW faultline. The island may once have been part of the Philippine Sea plate.

== Economy ==
Economic activities include farming, fishing, and mining. As of 2005, the copper, gold, silver, and zinc deposits on the island was estimated to be worth US$262 million.

Residents of Rapu-Rapu formerly relied on kerosene lamps and diesel generator sets. An electrification program installed home solar panel systems to 257 households on May 22, 2025.

== Administration ==
The island is divided into 11 rural barangays and the main town of Rapu-Rapu. It lies within the fourth-class municipality of Rapu-Rapu, which is part of the Province of Albay. The municipal health office operates a "sea ambulance", which is a motorboat produced by a local company.
