= Rapu-Rapu =

Municipality in Albay, Philippines

Rapu-Rapu Santa Florentina
- Municipality
- Municipality of Rapu-Rapu
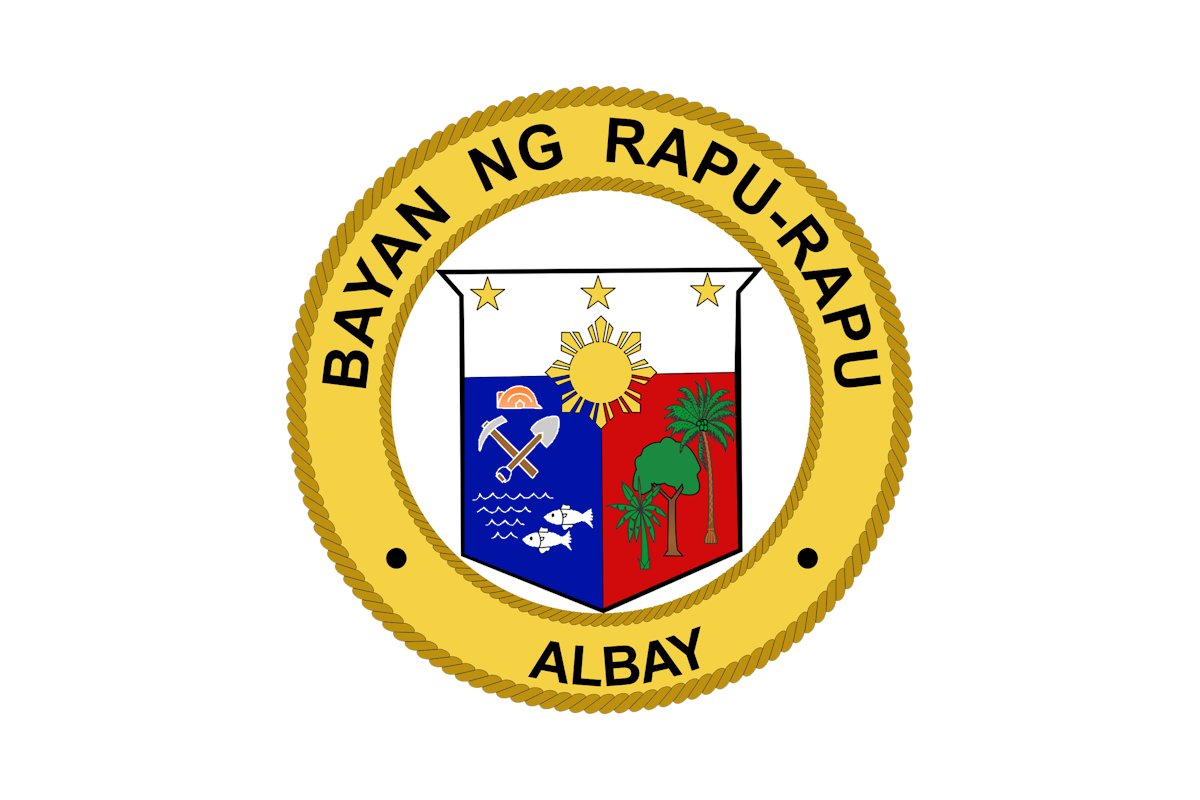
- Flag Seal
- Nickname: The Hidden Gem of Albay
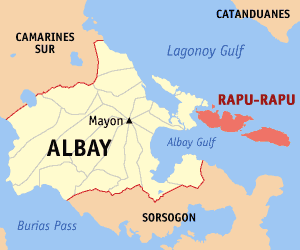
- Map of Albay with Rapu-Rapu highlighted
- Interactive map of Rapu-Rapu
- Location within the Philippines
- Coordinates: 13°11′N 124°08′E
- Country: Philippines
- Region: Bicol Region
- Province: Albay
- District: 2nd district
- Founded: 1902
- Barangays: 34 (see Barangays)

Government
  - Type: Sangguniang Bayan
  - Mayor: Romel "Otoy" Galicia
  - Vice Mayor: Tom Eivandick Galicia
  - Representative: Carlos "Caloy" Andes Loria
  - Municipal Council: Members: Sammy Batas; Be Batas-Bejaro; Napoleon B. Bello; Ken Bertumen; Ente Villalba; Khokok Arienda; Topher Santillan; Jay R Galicia
  - Electorate: 23,634 voters (2025)

Area
  - Total: 155.30 km^{2} (59.96 sq mi)
- Elevation: 27 m (89 ft)
- Highest elevation: 1,065 m (3,494 ft)
- Lowest elevation: 0 m (0 ft)

Population (2024 census)
  - Total: 36,281
  - Density: 233.62/km^{2} (605.07/sq mi)
  - Households: 7,929
- Demonym: Rapurapunon

Economy
  - Income class: 2nd municipal income class
  - Poverty incidence: 39.92% (2023)
  - Revenue: ₱ 178.5 million (2024)
  - Assets: ₱ 683.8 million (2024)
  - Expenditure: ₱ 164.3 million (2024)
  - Liabilities: ₱ 152.6 million (2024)

Service provider
  - Electricity: Albay Electric Cooperative (ALECO)
- Time zone: UTC+08:00 (PST)
- ZIP code: 4517
- PSGC: 0500515000
- IDD : area code: +63 (0)52
- Native languages: Central Bikol; Tagalog
- Catholic diocese: Diocese of Legazpi
- Website: www.rapu-rapu.gov.ph

Rapu-Rapu, officially the Municipality of Rapu-Rapu (Central Bikol: Banwaan kan Rapu-Rapu; Tagalog: Bayan ng Rapu-Rapu), is a municipality in the province of Albay in the Bicol Region of the Philippines. According to the 2024 census, it has a population of 36,281 people.

The municipality comprises three islands: Rapu-rapu Island, Batan Island, and Guinanayan Island.

== History ==
Rapu-Rapu and Batan Islands were historically part of Prieto Diaz in Sorsogon. Before it became a municipality in 1901, it was a bario of Prieto Diaz, Sorsogon. The Visita (Chapel) here and the spiritual and pastoral needs of the people were taken care of by the Parish Priest of Prieto Diaz. Records show that Rev. Fr. Santiago Nepomuceno was in charge here in the early part of 1891, then Rev. Fr. Juan Brusola took over. It was during his term that the Parish of Sta. Florentina was founded.

Sometime after 1891, Rapu-Rapu and Batan Islands became part of the municipality of Bacon, Sorsogon mainly due to their geographical location, nearer to Bacon than to Prieto Diaz. This move was more favorable to the people due to transportation issues. Because of the growing population in both islands, Governor Arlington Betts, Civil Governor for the Province of Albay, created the municipality of Rapu - Rapu in 1901. A plebiscite was held in which a majority of residents chose to join Albay rather than Sorsogon.

== Geography ==
Rapu-Rapu is located at 13°11′N 124°08′E.

According to the Philippine Statistics Authority, the municipality has a land area of 155.30 square kilometres (59.96 sq mi) constituting 6.03% of the 2,575.77-square-kilometre- (994.51 sq mi) total area of Albay.

Rapu-Rapu is 374 km (232 mi) southeast of Manila and 36 km (22 mi) east of Legazpi, the provincial capital. The small island of Rapu-Rapu and Batan lie to the east of Luzon and together with the islands of San Miguel and Cagraray, form the northern rim of Albay Gulf. These islands represents a low monoclinal continuation of the eastern structural arch into the waters of Lagonoy Gulf. Most of the land surface of Rapu-Rapu has exposed basement-complex rocks in its interior consisting mainly of serpentines. Rapu-Rapu have deposits of coal and copper.

=== Barangays ===
Rapu-Rapu is politically subdivided into 34 barangays. Each barangay consists of puroks and some have sitios.

PSGC	Barangay	Population			±% p.a.	
		2024		2010		
050515003	Bagaobawan	2.1%	769	722	▴	0.44%
050515004	Batan	3.0%	1,093	927	▴	1.15%
050515005	Bilbao	3.5%	1,265	1,172	▴	0.53%
050515006	Binosawan	2.1%	747	968	▾	−1.78%
050515007	Bogtong	3.0%	1,072	1,040	▴	0.21%
050515008	Buenavista	2.3%	820	791	▴	0.25%
050515009	Buhatan	2.8%	1,016	941	▴	0.53%
050515010	Calanaga	2.6%	927	708	▴	1.89%
050515011	Caracaran	3.8%	1,387	1,538	▾	−0.71%
050515012	Carogcog	1.2%	421	349	▴	1.31%
050515013	Dap-Dap	2.8%	1,024	890	▴	0.98%
050515014	Gaba	2.3%	836	973	▾	−1.05%
050515015	Galicia	5.6%	2,020	2,117	▾	−0.33%
050515016	Guadalupe	1.0%	346	323	▴	0.48%
050515017	Hamorawon	3.1%	1,118	1,100	▴	0.11%
050515018	Lagundi	1.9%	696	708	▾	−0.12%
050515019	Liguan	2.6%	958	918	▴	0.30%
050515020	Linao	1.3%	484	499	▾	−0.21%
050515021	Malobago	2.4%	869	868	▴	0.01%
050515022	Mananao	3.2%	1,178	1,129	▴	0.30%
050515023	Mancao	3.2%	1,146	1,226	▾	−0.47%
050515024	Manila	2.3%	840	740	▴	0.88%
050515025	Masaga	1.4%	517	501	▴	0.22%
050515026	Morocborocan	2.6%	929	987	▾	−0.42%
050515027	Nagcalsot	2.5%	899	864	▴	0.28%
050515028	Pagcolbon	0.7%	244	442	▾	−4.04%
050515029	Poblacion	16.1%	5,840	5,495	▴	0.42%
050515030	Sagrada	2.0%	723	629	▴	0.97%
050515031	San Ramon	6.1%	2,230	1,976	▴	0.84%
050515032	Santa Barbara	0.5%	198	159	▴	1.53%
050515033	Tinocawan	2.1%	753	699	▴	0.52%
050515034	Tinopan	2.0%	713	652	▴	0.62%
050515035	Viga	1.5%	543	544	▾	−0.01%
050515036	Villahermosa	6.3%	2,299	2,280	▴	0.06%
	Total		36,281	35,875	▴	0.08%

=== Climate ===
Climate data for Rapu-Rapu, Albay
Month	Jan	Feb	Mar	Apr	May	Jun	Jul	Aug	Sep	Oct	Nov	Dec	Year
Mean daily maximum °C (°F)	27 (81)	27 (81)	28 (82)	30 (86)	31 (88)	30 (86)	29 (84)	29 (84)	29 (84)	29 (84)	28 (82)	27 (81)	29 (84)
Mean daily minimum °C (°F)	22 (72)	22 (72)	23 (73)	24 (75)	25 (77)	25 (77)	25 (77)	25 (77)	25 (77)	24 (75)	24 (75)	23 (73)	24 (75)
Average precipitation mm (inches)	138 (5.4)	83 (3.3)	74 (2.9)	50 (2.0)	108 (4.3)	165 (6.5)	202 (8.0)	165 (6.5)	190 (7.5)	186 (7.3)	188 (7.4)	183 (7.2)	1,732 (68.3)
Average rainy days	16.8	11.9	13.5	13.8	20.5	25.2	27.4	26.2	26.1	24.7	20.7	18.5	245.3
Source: Meteoblue

Rapu-Rapu has a tropical climate. There is significant rainfall throughout the year in Rapu-Rapu. Even the driest month still has a lot of rainfall. According to Köppen and Geiger, the climate is classified as Af. The average annual temperature in Rapu-Rapu is 27.1 °C (80.8 °F). The average annual rainfall is 2,848 mm (112.1 in). The driest month is April with 132 mm (5.2 in). Most precipitation falls in December, with an average of 476 mm (18.7 in). The warmest month of the year is June with an average temperature of 28.3 °C (82.9 °F). In February, the average temperature is 25.7 °C (78.3 °F). It is the lowest average temperature of the whole year. The difference in precipitation between the driest month and the wettest month is 344 mm. The average temperatures vary during the year by 2.6 °C.

Typhoons are an especially frequent and destructive menace in the Bicol region. The months of September, October and November experience the more destructive of these violent tropical storms. Forty percent of the storms carrying high-velocity winds in the Philippine pass through Southeastern Luzon where Rapu-Rapu is located.

== Demographics ==
Population census of Rapu-Rapu
Year	Pop.	±% p.a.
1903	3,834	—
1918	6,302	+3.37%
1939	12,011	+3.12%
1948	14,912	+2.43%
1960	16,799	+1.00%
1970	19,786	+1.65%
1975	21,848	+2.01%
1980	25,176	+2.88%
1990	26,362	+0.46%
1995	28,797	+1.67%
2000	29,176	+0.28%
2007	32,646	+1.56%
2010	35,875	+3.49%
2015	36,920	+0.55%
2020	36,151	−0.44%
2024	36,281	+0.09%
Source: Philippine Statistics Authority

In the 2024 census, Rapu-Rapu had a population of 36,281 people. The population density was 230 inhabitants per square kilometre (600/sq mi).

== Economy ==
Poverty incidence of Rapu-Rapu (%)

Source: Philippine Statistics Authority

== Government ==
The following were the elected officials of Rapu-Rapu for the term 2013–2016.

Local executive officials and members of the city council
Mayor	Ronald Galicia (NP)
Vice Mayor	Nora Onate (NP)
Councilors
Councilors	Florante Dela Cruz (NP)
Councilors	Retchell Bajaro (NP)
Councilors	Larry Batas (NP)
Councilors	Jun Jun Berjuega (LP)
Councilors	Napoleon Bello (LP)
Councilors	Arturo Ebrada (NP)
Councilors	Zenaida Guianan (LP)
Councilors	Gad Galicia (NP)

== Education ==
There are two schools district offices which govern all educational institutions within the municipality. They oversee the management and operations of all private and public, from primary to secondary schools. These are the:

- Rapu-Rapu East Schools District
- Rapu-Rapu West Schools District

Rapu-Rapu has 36 elementary schools and 7 secondary schools directly supervised by Department of Education-Division of Albay.

=== Primary and elementary schools ===
- Acal Elementary School
- Bagaobawan Elementary School
- Batan Elementary School
- Bilbao Elementary School
- Binosawan Elementary School
- Bogtong Elementary School
- Buenavista Elementary School
- Buhatan Elementary School
- Calanaga Elementary School
- Caracaran Elementary School
- Carogcog Elementary School
- Dapdap Elementary School
- Gaba Elementary School
- Galicia Elementary School
- Guinanayan Elementary School
- Hamorawon Elementary School
- Lagundi Elementary School
- Liguan Elementary School
- Linao Elementary School
- Malobago Elementary School
- Mananao Elementary School
- Mancao Elementary School
- Manila Elementary School
- Masaga Elementary School
- Minso Elementary School
- Morocborocan Elementary School
- Nagcalsot Elementary School
- Nstr. Sra De Guadalupe Elementary School
- Pagcolbon Elementary School
- Rapu-Rapu Elementary School
- Sagrada Elementary School
- San Ramon Elementary School
- Tinocawan Elementary School
- Tinopan Elementary School
- Viga Elementary School
- Villahermosa Elementary School

=== Secondary schools ===
- Batan National High School
- Bilbao National High School
- Bogtong National High School
- Mancao National High School
- Rapu-Rapu National High School
- Tinopan National High School
- Villahermosa National High School
