= Tabaco National High School =

Public high school in Albay, Philippines

- Mataas na Paaralang Pambansa ng Tabaco (Filipino)

Location
- Panal; Tabaco City, Albay; Philippines
- Coordinates: 13°21′22″N 123°43′9.1″E

Information
- Type: Public, Secondary School
- Motto: "Flying High, Soaring High."
- Established: 1945
- School code: 302285
- Principal: Salve B. Estrella
- Enrollment: 26480
- Language: English, Filipino
- Colors: Green and white
- Nickname: TNHS
- Publication: The Vanguard, Ang Tanod
- Affiliations: Department of Education - Division of Tabaco City
- Website: Website

Tabaco National High School (Filipino: Mataas na Paaralang Pambansa ng Tabaco) is a public secondary school that was founded in 1945. It is located in barangay Panal, Tabaco City, Albay.

== History ==
Albay High School, located in Tabaco, was established in 1945 in the aftermath of World War II. Due to the destruction of its original campus in Legazpi, the school was relocated to the Tee Qua Chee Gan Building in Tabaco under Principal Benigno Reyes. Although there were plans to return the school to Legazpi, the decision to keep Albay High School in Tabaco gained significant support, including the support of Congressman Casimiro Binamira and Governor Saturnino Benino. As a result, the institution operated with two campuses: one in Tabaco and another in Legazpi. In 1949, Tabaco High School was founded, marking it as the first municipal high school in the country.

When classes opened the following year, there was a move to return the Albay High School to Legazpi, but prominent citizens of the province opposed the move. Congressman Casimiro Binamira, former Governor Saturnino Benito, Atty. Simplicio B. Peña, and local and provincial leaders worked to keep the high school in Tabaco.

They succeeded and Mr. Pastor Escalante was appointed principal of that Albay High School in Tabaco. However, due to the problem of the buildings, school necessities and other things, classes were shifted from Qua Chee Gan to Golinco and later to Poblete Buildings with students furnishing the school necessities such as chairs and tables. That school year was remarkable, for the first High School day was celebrated with Marichu Crisol reigning as Miss Tabaco High School.

There was a later plan to move Tabaco Albay High School to its former site, but this was successfully resisted by local people. The Parent–teacher association raised funds for a permanent school site.
