= Batan Island, Albay =

Island in Albay, Philippines

Batan Island

Geography
- Location: Philippine Sea
- Coordinates: 13°15′0″N 124°0′0″E
- Adjacent to: Albay Gulf; Lagonoy Gulf; Philippine Sea

Administration
- Philippines
- Region: Bicol Region
- Province: Albay
- Municipality: Rapu-rapu

Demographics
- Population: 1,145 (2020)

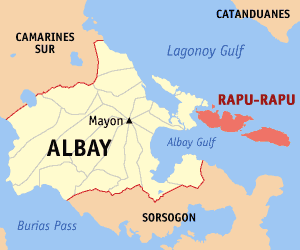

Batan Island is an Island in the Municipality of Rapu-rapu, Albay. The island consists of 5 barangays and forms a pair with Rapu-rapu Island to form the municipality of Rapu-r apu.

== Geography ==
The Island is situated in the Lagonoy Gulf and in the Albay Gulf. It is also adjacent to the Philippine Sea and the Pacific Ocean. Some neighboring Islands are Rapu-rapu Island and Cagraray.
