= Tabaco Church =

Roman Catholic church in Albay, Philippines

- Saint John the Baptist Parish Church
- San Juan Bautista Parish Church; Iglesia Parroquial de San Juan Bautista (Spanish)
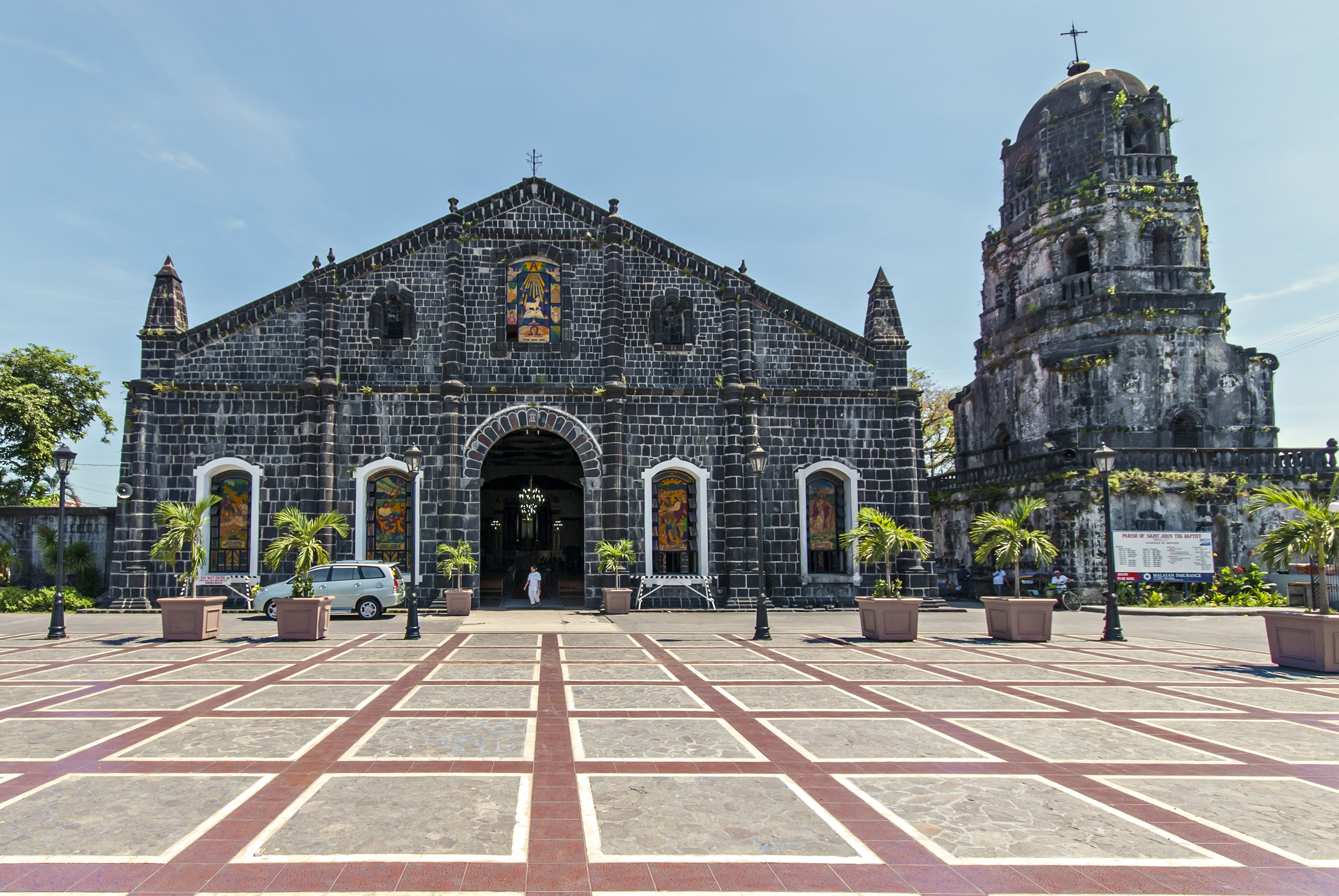
- Church facade in 2010

- Location in Albay Location in Luzon Location in the Philippines
- 13°21′35″N 123°43′45″E
- Location: Tabaco
- Country: Philippines
- Denomination: Roman Catholic

History
- Status: Parish church
- Founded: 1664 (as a Parish)
- Dedication: Saint John the Baptist

Architecture
- Functional status: Active
- Heritage designation: National Cultural Treasure
- Architectural type: Church building
- Style: Baroque

Administration
- Province: Caceres
- Archdiocese: Caceres
- Diocese: Legazpi

Clergy
- Archbishop: Rolando Joven Tria Tirona
- Bishop: Joel Z. Baylon
- Priest(s): Rev. Fr. Eduardo R. Ramin, Jr.

Saint John the Baptist Parish Church, commonly known as Tabaco Church, is a Roman Catholic church in the city of Tabaco, Philippines under the jurisdiction of the Diocese of Legazpi.

The church of Tabaco was founded by the Franciscans under the advocacy of Saint John the Baptist and became an independent parish in 1616. It was also declared a National Cultural Treasure of the Philippines.

== History ==
Tabaco was established as a visita by the Franciscans under the patronage of Saint John the Baptist in 1587. It was separated from Cagsaua in 1616 when Father Pedro de Alcareso was named as parish priest. It was administered by the Franciscans until 1660. It became an independent parish in 1664. Since 1750, the church was supervised by the secular clergy. The present church was built by the seculars in 1864 and completed in 1879.

The church, one of the only two declared sites in Bicol Region, was categorized by the National Museum of the Philippines as a National Cultural Treasure of the country. Its marker was unveiled on June 22, 2012.

== Features ==
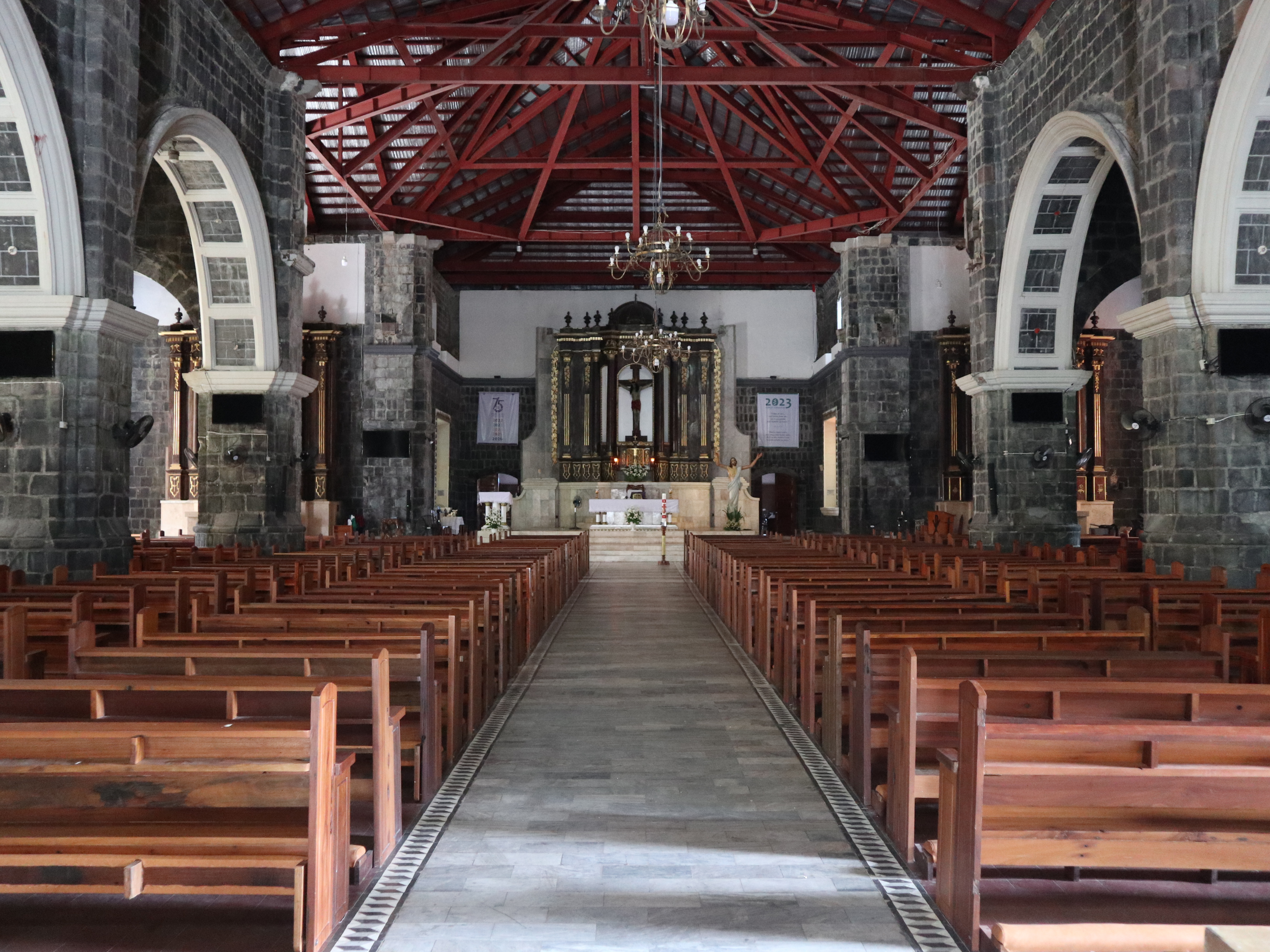
Church interior in 2023

The church is built out of dark volcanic soil and stones found in the area. One unusual characteristic of the church is the presence of mason's marks on stones used for the construction of the church building, a rare feature in the Philippines. Its unusual floor plan contains compartments for which there is currently no explanation. It is known for its beautiful and bell tower embedded with rococo designs.

=== Rehabilitation ===
Albay Governor Joey Salceda allotted ₱ 35 million for the rehabilitation of the historical and cultural heritage sites in the province including the Tabaco church.

== Bibliography ==
- Huerta, Felix (1865). Estado geográfico, topográfico, estadístico, histórico-religioso (in Spanish). Binondo: Imprenta de M. Sanchez y Ca.
- Historical markers: Regions V-XII. Manila: National Historical Institute. 1993. p. 65. ISBN 9789715380690.
