= San Miguel Island (Philippines) =

Island in Albay, Philippines

- Location within Albay Location within Luzon Location within Philippines

Geography
- Location: Lagonoy Gulf
- Coordinates: 13°22′31″N 123°48′28″E
- Adjacent to: Philippine Sea

Administration
- Philippines
- Region: Bicol Region
- Province: Albay
- City: Tabaco
- Barangays: Agnas; Hacienda; Rawis; Sagurong; Visita

Demographics
- Population: 13,969

Additional information

San Miguel Island is an island in the province of Albay in the Philippines located at the western end of the strip of islands in Lagonoy Gulf. The island is under the jurisdiction of the city of Tabaco, and comprises five barangays: Agnas, Hacienda, Rawis, Sagurong and Visita. The main economic activities are farming, fishing, basket and mat weaving, and cattle raising.

In 2019, due to El Niño, the island ran out of potable water. In 2020, the opposite happened when Typhoon Molave struck the island.ref>"Thousands flee homes as Philippines braces for year's 17th typhoon". Oman Daily Observer. 25 October 2020.</ref>
