= Mayon Planetarium and Science Park =

Planetarium and geology museum in Albay, Philippines

- Coordinates: 13°17′03″N 123°40′18″E
- Type: Planetarium and Geology museum
- Owner: Tabaco City Government
- Building details

General information
- Status: Completed
- Location: Tabaco, Albay, Philippines
- Inaugurated: 2006

The Mayon Planetarium and Science Park, also known as the Virtual Mayon Simulation and Observatory Facility, is a planetarium and geology museum in the city of Tabaco in Albay, Philippines.

The planetarium was built under the initiative of former House of Representatives member, Edcel Lagman Sr. Its construction was funded by the Priority Development Assistance Fund allocated to Lagman. The facility is operated by the city government of Tabaco.

The facility is situated 854 metres (2,802 ft) above sea level at the foot of the Mayon Volcano within the 6 kilometres (3.7 mi) permanent danger zone and was opened in March 2006. The planetarium grounds covers a 1,000 square metres (11,000 sq ft) area. The planetarium also host observation facilities which offers panoramic view of nearby towns and geographical features including the Mayon Volcano itself.

The building has a single storey and hosts four rooms which houses a library, the virtual room, a mini-museum and an audiovisual hall. The dome measures 6 metres (20 ft).
