= Lagonoy Gulf =

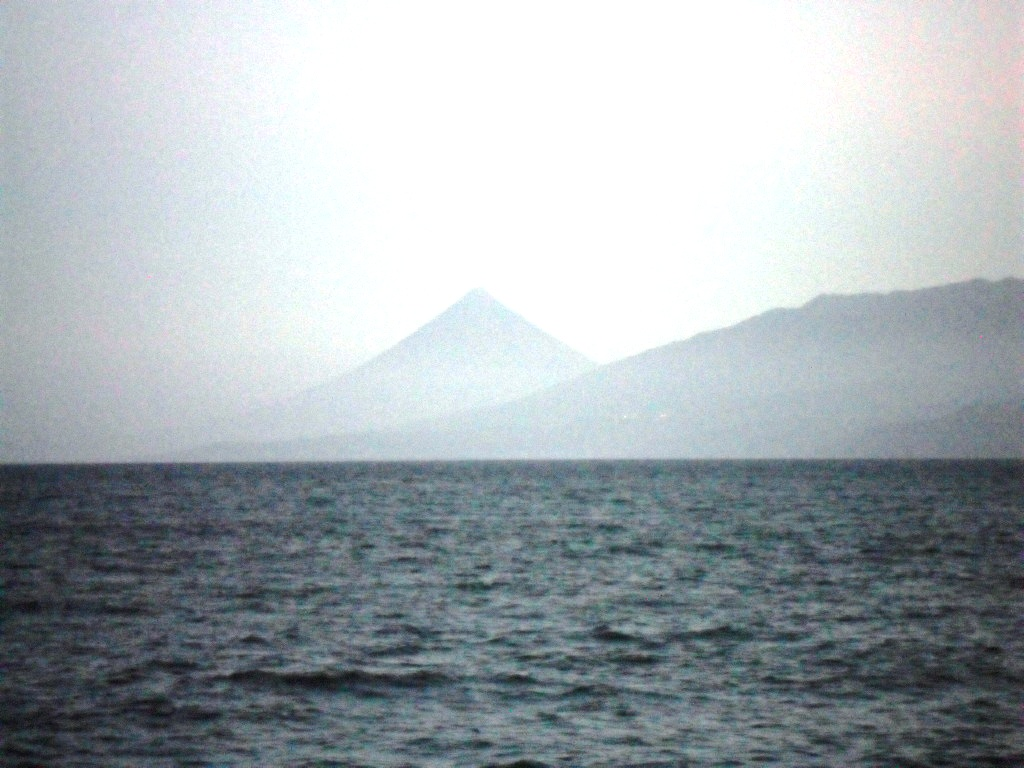
- The gulf seen from San Jose, with Mayon Volcano in the background

- Location in Luzon Location in the Philippines
- Location: Bicol Peninsula
- Coordinates: 13°35′24″N 123°40′22″E
- Type: gulf
- Etymology: Lagonoy
- Settlements: Bacacay; Caramoan; Lagonoy; Malilipot; Malinao; Presentacion; Rapu-Rapu; Sagñay; San Andres; San Jose; Tabaco; Tigaon; Tiwi; Virac

Lagonoy Gulf is a large gulf in the Bicol Peninsula of Luzon island in the Philippines.

The gulf is home to 480 fish species, and annual fishery production in 2004 amounted to some 20,000 MT, making Lagonoy Gulf a major fishing ground in the Philippines. Coral reefs, seaweed/seagrass beds, and mangroves form the critical habitats for gulf's ecology.

== Geography ==
The gulf is home to many habiats like Mangroves or Coral Reefs. The gulf is also adjacent to the Pacific Ocean and the provinces of Albay and Camarines Sur. It is separated from the Philippine Sea by the Caramoan Peninsula in the north; and is separated from Albay Gulf in the south by a chain of islands including Batan Island and Rapu-rapu Island. It is about 3,070 square kilometres (1,190 sq mi) in area, with 80% of its area between 800 metres (2,600 ft) and 1,200 metres (3,900 ft) deep.
