= Filipinos in Taiwan =

Filipinos who live in Taiwan

Filipinos in Taiwan Pilipino sa Taiwan 在臺菲律賓人
Total population
- 173,200 (September 2025)

Regions with significant populations
- Taipei · Taoyuan · Hsinchu · Taichung · Yilan · Kaoshiung · Hualien · Orchid Island

Languages
- Ivatan, Itbayat, Yami, Tagalog, English, Taiwanese Mandarin, Taiwanese Hokkien

Religion
- Roman Catholicism · Protestantism

Related ethnic groups
- Overseas Filipino, Tao people

Filipinos in Taiwan consist mainly of immigrants and workers from the Philippines. Filipinos form the third largest national contingent of migrant workers and account for about one-fifth of foreign workers in Taiwan as of April 2019.

== Overview ==
Around 800 years ago, the ancestors of the Tao people, considered a Taiwanese aboriginal group, arrived on Orchid Island from the Batanes archipelago.

The strong Taiwanese economy, particularly in the manufacturing industries, attracts cheap manual labor from the Philippines. Most Filipinos working in Taiwan work as factory workers, domestic workers, construction workers, fishermen and professionals and they would send a large part of their earnings to their families in the Philippines. Many Taiwanese men have also chosen Filipino women as brides through arranged marriages. An estimated 7,000 Filipino women now live there with their Taiwanese husbands.

Philippine holidays such as Independence day and José Rizal Day are also celebrated by the Filipino community in Taiwan.

Many Philippine-educated Chinese Filipinos or so called Chinoys (Traditional Chinese: 華菲人) from middle-class families have migrated to Taiwan since the early 1990s. Approximately 1000 or more now have Taiwan citizenship.

Based on a report by Directorate-General of Budget, Accounting and Statistics (DGBAS), as of end of April 2019, 154,000 OFWs are living and working in Taiwan.

There are many Filipino stores, cargo, remittances and restaurants throughout the island of Taiwan.

Churches

- St. Christopher's Church 聖多福天主堂 St. Christopher's Church 聖多福天主堂

=== Social issues ===
Filipino laborers in Taiwan are usually vulnerable to exploitation by their employers, a situation common to unskilled migrant workers all over the world. The Taiwanese government has been receptive to the cases involving mistreatment of Filipino workers in Taiwan.

Filipino migrant caretakers in Taiwan have to go through a broker system that collects most of their monthly earnings, demands long work hours without overtime pay, and offers no days off. Some caretakers have to work for 24 hours a day. Home caretakers typically receive monthly salaries much lower than the standard set by the government because they are not covered by Taiwan's Labor Standards Act.

On 9 May 2013, the Philippine Coast Guard opened fire in open seas between the two countries on a Taiwanese fishing boat, killing one fisherman. Following the incident, Taiwan imposed sanctions on the Philippines, including the freeze of Filipino hires since the Filipino authorities refused and ignored the request for an apology to the families of the victim.

== See also ==
- Philippines–Taiwan relations
