= Northern Philippine languages =

Northern Philippine
- Geographic distribution: Luzon
- Linguistic classification: Austronesian: Malayo-Polynesian; Philippine; Northern Philippine
- Subdivisions: Batanic; Central Luzon; Northern Luzon; Northern Mindoro

Language codes

The Northern Philippine languages are a proposed group of the Philippine languages. They are a larger language group spoken in north central Luzon, and the small islands between Luzon and Formosa, including Ilokano, Pangasinan, Ibanag, Kapampangan, and the Yami language of Taiwan.

The Northern Philippine languages are a long-established group which has often been taken to be more a geographic convenience than linguistic reality. However, a 2008 analysis of the Austronesian Basic Vocabulary Database fully supported the unity of the languages as a family. It also provided a low level of support (at 60% confidence) that the Batanic branch is closest to Northern Luzon. The Northern Mindoro branch was not included in the analysis.

== Classification ==
- Batanic languages (4 languages between Luzon and Formosa)
- Northern Luzon languages (41 languages)
  - Ilokano
  - Northern Cordilleran languages (15 languages)
  - Meso-Cordilleran languages (25 languages)
- Central Luzon languages (5 languages)
  - Kapampangan (spoken in Pampanga)
  - Sambalic languages (spoken in Zambales)
  - Sinauna
- Northern Mindoro languages (or North Mangyan; 3 languages)
