= Ivatan =

Ivatan or Ibatan may refer to:

- Ivatan people, of Batanes, Philippines
- Ivatan language, their Batanic (Austronesian) language
