= Sorsogon (disambiguation) =

Sorsogon may refer to

- Sorsogon Province, province of the Philippines
  - Sorsogon City, its capital
- Sorsogon Bay
- Sorsogon (Balikmaya)
- Sorsogon language (disambiguation)
