= Philippine languages =

Proposed branch of the Austronesian language family

Philippine
- Philippinic
- (proposed)
- Geographic distribution: Philippines; Indonesia (Northern Sulawesi, northern portion of North Kalimantan); Malaysia (Parts of Sabah); Taiwan (Orchid Island)
- Native speakers: (undated figure of 115+ million)
- Linguistic classification: Austronesian: Malayo-Polynesian; Philippine
- Proto-language: Proto-Philippine (disputed)
- Subdivisions: Batanic; Northern Luzon; Central Luzon; North Mangyan; Umiray Dumaget; Manide–Alabat; Greater Central Philippine; Ati; Kalamian; South Mindanao; Klata; Minahasan; Sangiric

Language codes
- ISO 639-2 / 5: phi
- Glottolog: None
- The Philippine languages, per Adelaar and Himmelmann (2005)

The Philippine languages or Philippinic are a proposed group by R. David Paul Zorc (1986) and Robert Blust (1991; 2005; 2019) that include all the languages of the Philippines and northern Sulawesi, Indonesia—except Sama–Bajaw (languages of the "Sea Gypsies") and the Molbog language (disputed)—and form a subfamily of Austronesian languages. Although the Philippines is near the center of Austronesian expansion from Taiwan, there is relatively little linguistic diversity among the approximately 150 Philippine languages, suggesting that earlier diversity has been erased by the spread of the ancestor of the modern Philippine languages.

== Classification ==
=== History and criticism ===
One of the first explicit classifications of a "Philippine" grouping based on genetic affiliation was in 1906 by Frank Blake, who placed them as a subdivision of the "Malay branch" within Malayo-Polynesian (MP), which at that time was considered as a family. However, Blake encompasses every language within the geographic boundaries of the Philippine archipelago to be under a single group. Formal arguments in support of a specific "Proto-Philippines" were followed by Matthew Charles in 1974, Teodoro Llamzon in 1966 and 1975, and Llamzon and Teresita Martin in 1976. Blust (1991) two decades later updates this based on Zorc's (1986) inclusion of Yami, and the Sangiric, Minahasan, and Gorontalo groups.

The genetic unity of a Philippines group has been rejected particularly by Lawrence Reid. This arose with problems in reconstructing Philippine subgroups within MP (Pawley, 1999; Ross, 2005). In a recent state-of-the art on the classification of Philippine languages, he provides multidisciplinary arguments on the field's methodological and theoretical shortcomings since Conant's description in the early 1900s. This includes Malayo-Polynesian archeology (Spriggs, 2003; 2007; 2011), and Bayesian phylogenetic analyses (Gray et al., 2009) substantiating the multiplicity of historical diffusion and divergence of languages across the archipelago. He suggests that the primary branches under this widely acknowledged Philippine group should instead be promoted as primary branches under Malayo-Polynesian. Malcolm Ross (2005) earlier also noted that the Batanic languages, constituting Yami, Itbayat, and Ivatan, should in fact be considered as a primary MP branch. In an evaluation of the lexical innovations among the Philippine languages, Alexander Smith (2017) regards the evidence for a Philippine subgroup as weak, and concludes that "they may represent more than one primary subgroup or perhaps an innovation-defined linkage". Chen et al. (2022) present further arguments for the Philippine languages being a convergence area (sprachbund) rather than a unified phylogenetic subgroup.

=== Internal classification ===
The Philippine group is proposed to have originated from Proto-Malayo-Polynesian and ultimately from Proto-Austronesian. There have been several proposals as to the composition within the group, but the most widely accepted groupings today is the consensus classifications by Blust (1991; 2005) and Reid (2017); however, both disagree on the existence of a Philippine group as a single genetic unit.

==== Zorc (1979) ====
An earlier classification by Zorc (1979) is presented below. From approximately north to south, a Philippine group according to his analysis of previous reconstructions are divided into two main subgroups, Northern or "Cordilleran" and Southern or "Sulic". Note that the groupings herein no longer reflect widely accepted classifications or naming conventions today. For example South Extension nowadays reflects the widely established Central Luzon, and North Mangyan within Cordilleran is not supported by later reconstructions; the group containing Yami, Ivatan and Itbayat is called "Bashiic" in Zorc (1977) and remains generally accepted.

- Philippine
  - Northern Philippines or Cordilleran
    - Pangasinic^{a} (includes Ilongot, Kallahan, Ibaloi, Pangasinan)
    - Central Cordilleran (includes Isinai, Kalinga, Bontoc, Balangao, Ifugao)
    - Ilokan (within Ilokano alone)
    - Northern Cordilleran or Banagic (includes Ibanag, Isneg, Gaddang)
    - Yami–Ivatan–Itbayat^{b}
    - South Extension (includes Sambal group, Kapampangan)
      - North Mangyan
  - Southern Philippines or Sulic
    - Meso-Philippine
      - South Mangyan (includes Hanunuo)
      - Palawan
      - Subanon (dialect cluster)
      - Central Philippine (includes Tagalog, Bikol, Visayan, Mansakan)
    - Manobo (includes Kagayanen, Western Bukidnon, Cotabato Manobo)
    - Danao (includes Maranao, Maguindanao)
    - Celebes Extension (includes Mongondow group)

==== Blust (1991; 2005) ====
From approximately north to south, the Philippine languages are divided into 12 subgroups (including unclassified languages):

- Philippine
  - Batanic languages (4 languages between Batanes and Lanyu Island, Taiwan)
  - Northern Luzon languages (40 languages, including Ilokano and Pangasinan)
  - Central Luzon languages (5 languages, including Sambal and Kapampangan)
  - Northern Mindoro languages (or North Mangyan; 3 languages)
  - Greater Central Philippine languages
    - Southern Mindoro languages (or South Mangyan; 3 languages)
    - Central Philippine languages (40 languages, including Tagalog, Bikol languages and Visayan languages)
    - Palawan languages (3 languages)
    - Subanen languages (6 languages; sometimes considered one dialect cluster)
    - Danao languages (3 languages; Iranun, Maguindanao and Maranao)
    - Manobo languages (15 languages)
    - Gorontalo–Mongondow languages (9 languages of Gorontalo and North Sulawesi)
  - Ati language
  - Manide–Alabat
  - Kalamian languages (2 languages of northern Palawan)
  - South Mindanao languages (5 languages)
  - Sangiric languages (4 languages of Sangir and Talaud Islands)
  - Minahasan languages (5 languages of North Sulawesi)
  - Unclassified
    - Umiray Dumaget

Formerly classified as one of the South Mindanao languages, the Klata language is now considered to be a primary branch of the Southern Philippine languages by Zorc (2019).

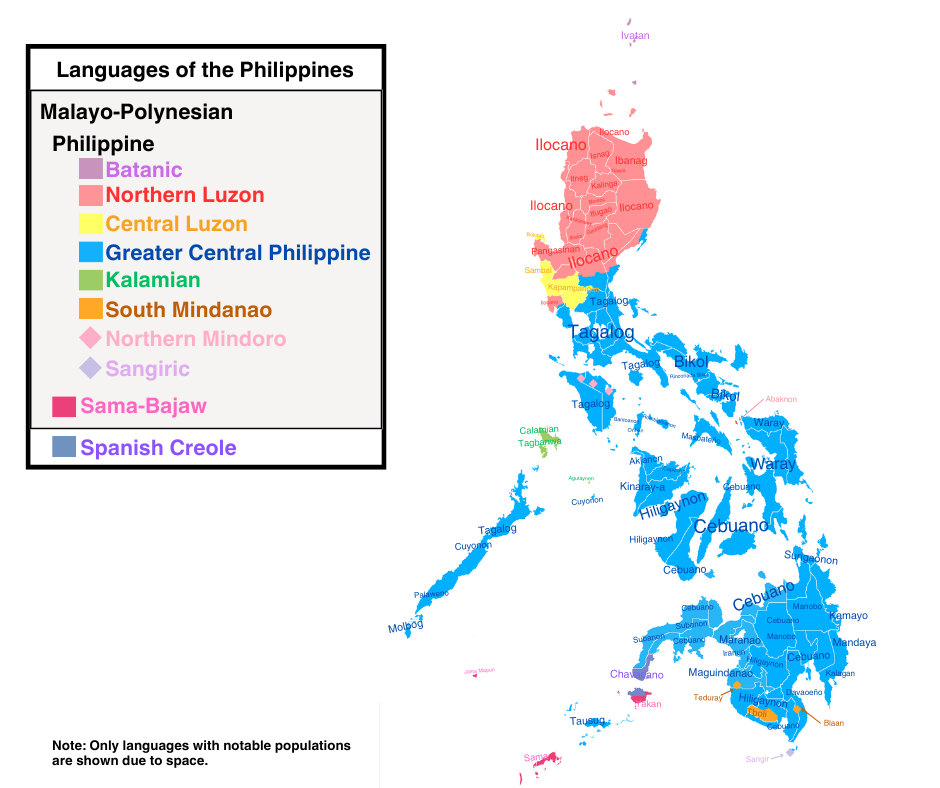
Map of the distribution of the major languages of the Philippines, showing their subdivisions

== Vocabulary ==
Comparison chart between several selected Philippine languages spoken from north to south with Proto-Austronesian first for comparison.

		1	2	3	4	5	person	house	dog	coconut	day	new	we (incl.)	what	fire
Proto-Austronesian		*əsa *isa	*duSa	*təlu	*Səpat	*lima	*Cau	*Rumaq	*asu	*niuR	*qaləjaw	*baqəRu	*i-kita	*n-anu	*Sapuy
Batanic (Bashiic)	Yami (Tao)	ása	dóa (raroa)	tílo (tatlo)	apat (ápat)	lima	tao	vahay	chito	niyoy	araw	vayo	yaten	ango	apoy
Batanic (Bashiic)	Ivatan	asa	dadowa	tatdo	apat	lima	tao	vahay	chito	niyoy	araw	va-yo	yaten	ango	apoy
Northern Luzon	Ilocano	maysa	dua	tallo	uppat	lima	tao	balay	aso	niog	aldaw	baro	sitayo	ania	apoy
Northern Luzon	Ibanag	tadday	dua	tallu	appa'	lima	tolay	balay	kitu	niuk	aggaw	bagu	sittam	anni	afi
Northern Luzon	Gaddang	antet	addwa	tallo	appat	lima	tolay	balay	atu	ayog	aw	bawu	ikkanetam	sanenay	afuy
Northern Luzon	Pangasinan	sakey	dua duara	talo talora	apat apatira	lima	too	abong	aso	niyog	ageo	balo	sikatayo	anto	pool
Central Luzon	Kapampangan	métung	adwá	atlú	ápat	limá	táu	balé	ásu	ngúngut	aldó	báyu	ítámu	nánu	apî
Central Philippine	Tagalog	isa	dalawa	tatlo	apat	lima	tao	bahay	aso	niyog	araw	bago	tayo	ano	apoy
Central Philippine	Central Bikol	sarô	duwa	tulo	apát	lima	tawo	harong	ayam idò	niyog	aldaw	bâgo	kitá	ano	kalayo
Central Philippine	Rinconada Bikol	əsad	darwā	tolō	əpat	lima	tawō	baləy	ayam	noyog	aldəw	bāgo	kitā	onō	kalayō
Central Philippine	Waray	usa sayo	duha	tulo	upat	lima	tawo	balay	ayam ido	lubi	adlaw	bag-o	kita	ano	kalayo
Central Philippine	Hiligaynon	isa	duha	tatlo	apat	lima	tawo	balay	ido	lubi	adlaw	bag-o	kita	ano	kalayo
Central Philippine	Bantoanon (Asi)	usa	ruha	tuyo	upat	lima	tawo	bayay	iro	nidog	adlaw	bag-o	kita	ni-o	kayado
Central Philippine	Romblomanon	isa	duha	tuyo	upat	lima	tawo	bayay	ayam	niyog	adlaw	bag-o	kita	ano	kalayo
Central Philippine	Onhan	isya	darwa	tatlo	ap-at	lima	tawo	balay	ayam	niyog	adlaw	bag-o	kita	ano	kalayo
Central Philippine	Karay-a	sara	darwa	tatlo	apat	lima	taho	balay	ayam	niyog	adlaw	bag-o	kita tatən	ano	kalayo
Central Philippine	Aklanon	isaea sambilog	daywa	tatlo	ap-at	lima	tawo	baeay	ayam	niyog	adlaw	bag-o	kita	ano	kaeayo
Central Philippine	Cebuano	usa	duha	tulo	upat	lima	tawo	balay	iro	lubi	adlaw	bag-o	kita	unsa	kalayo
Central Philippine	Tausug	isa hambuuk	duwa	tu	upat	lima	tau	bay	iru'	niyug	adlaw	ba-gu	kitaniyu	unu	kayu
Danao	Maguindanao	isa	dua	telu	pat	lima	tau	walay	asu	niyug	gay	bagu	tanu	ngin	apuy
Danao	Mëranaw	isa	dowa	t'lo	phat	lima	taw	walay	aso	neyog	gawi'e	bago	tano	tonaa	apoy
Danao	Iranun	isa	dua	telu	pa'at	lima	taw	walay	asu	niyug	gawi'i	bagu	tanu	antuna	apuy
South Mindanao (Bilic)	Tboli	sotu	lewu	tlu	fat	lima	tau	gunu	ohu	lefo	kdaw	lomi	tekuy	tedu	ofih
Minahasan	Tombulu (Minahasa)	esa	zua rua	telu	epat	lima	tou	walé	asu	po'po'	endo	weru	kai kita	apa	api
Sangiric	Sangirese	sembau esa'	darua	tatelu	epa'	lima	tau	balé	kapuna'	bango'	elo	wuhu	kité	tawé	putung
Gorontalo–Mongondow	Gorontalo	tuwewu	duluwo	totolu	opato	limo	tawu	bele	'apula	bongo	dulahu	bohu	'ito	wolo	tulu
Gorontalo–Mongondow	Mongondow	inta'	dua	tolu	opat	lima	intau	baloi	ungku'	bango'	singgai	mobagu	kita	onu, onda	tulu'

== See also ==
- Languages of the Philippines
- List of regional languages of the Philippines
- Philippine Negrito languages
- Philippine literature
- Komisyon sa Wikang Filipino
- Visayan Academy of Arts and Letters

Defunct language regulators

- Academia Bicolana
- Sanghiran san Binisaya

== Notes ==
1. Ambiguous relationship with other Northern Philippine groups
2. Ambiguous relationship with other Northern Philippine groups and has possible relationship with South Extension; equivalent to the widely established Batanic or Bashiic branch.

== Works cited ==
- Adelaar, Alexander; Himmelmann, Nikolaus P., eds. (2005). The Austronesian Languages of Asia and Madagascar. London: Routledge.
