= Ibanag language =

Language spoken in the Philippines

Ibanag
- Ybanag, Ibanak
- Native to: Philippines
- Region: Northern Luzon
- Ethnicity: Ibanag
- Native speakers: 600,000 (2024)
- Language family: Austronesian: Malayo-Polynesian; Philippine; Northern Luzon; Cagayan Valley; Ibanag
- Writing system: Latin

Official status
- Recognised minority language in: Regional language in the Philippines
- Regulated by: Komisyon sa Wikang Filipino

Language codes
- ISO 639-3: ibg
- Glottolog: iban1267
- Linguasphere: 31-CCB-a
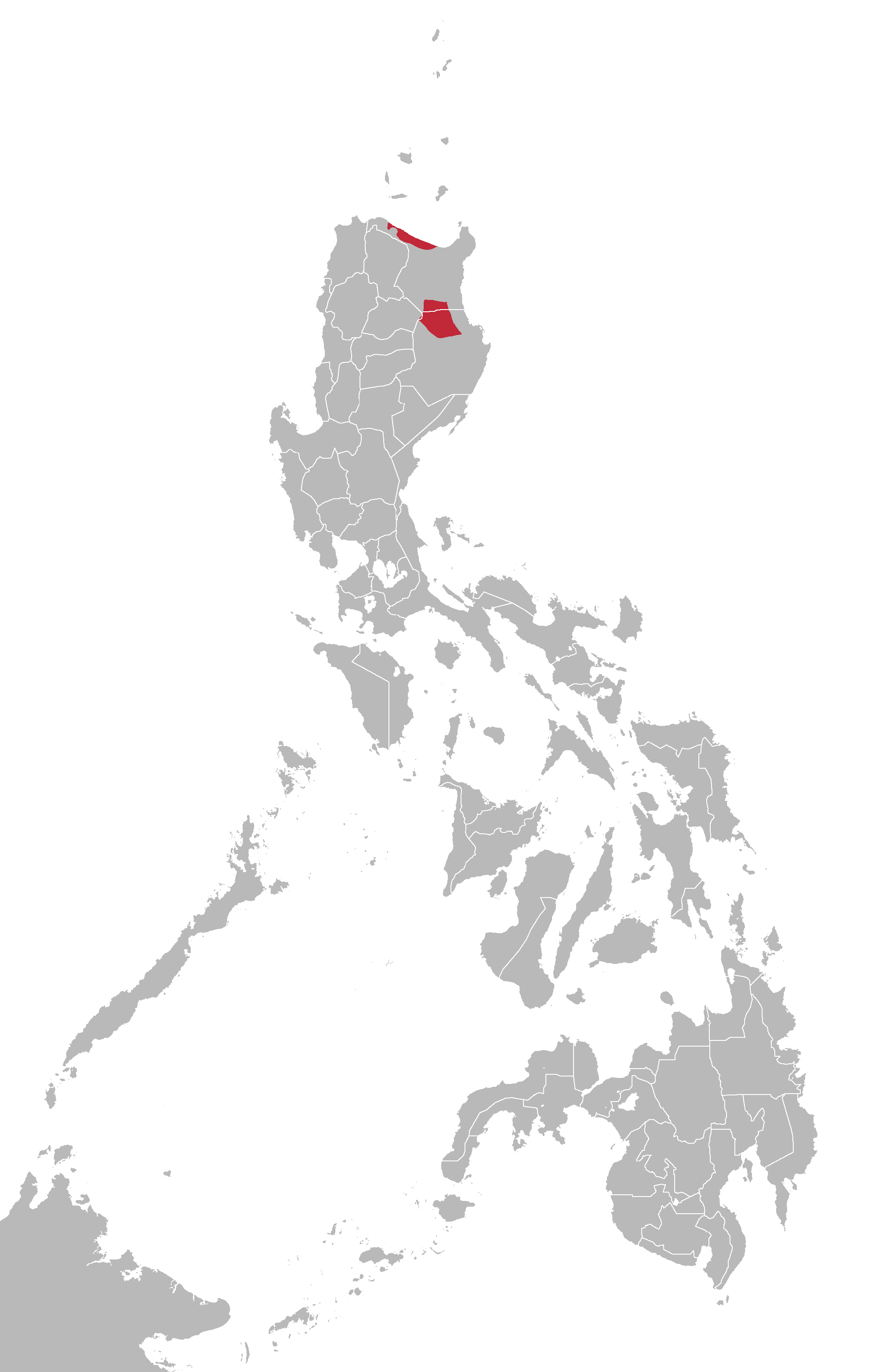
- Areas where Ibanag is spoken according to Ethnologue

The Ibanag language (also written as Ybanag or Ibanak) is an Austronesian language spoken by up to 463,390 speakers, mostly comprising the Ibanag people, in the northeastern provinces of Isabela and Cagayan in the Philippines.

It is spoken widely in the communities of Abulug, Buguey, Camalaniugan, Lal-lo, Solana, and Tuguegarao, all in the province of Cagayan. Also in the communities of Cabagan, Ilagan, San Pablo, Santo Tomas, Santa Maria, and Tumauini, all in the province of Isabela, as well as in the area around the Cagayan River. The language is also spoken in barangay San Agustin East, in Agoo, in the province of La Union.

Ibanag is also spoken by Filipinos in the Middle East, United Kingdom, and the United States. Most speakers of Ibanag can also speak Ilocano, the lingua franca of northern Luzon island. The name Ibanag comes from the prefix I- which means 'people of', and bannag, meaning 'river'. Ibanag is closely related to Gaddang, Itawis, Agta, Atta, Yogad, Isneg and Malaweg.

== Classification ==
As with other widely spoken Philippine languages like Cebuano and Tagalog, Ibanag is an Austronesian language. Within this language family. Ibanag belongs to the Northern Philippine languages subgroup, which also includes the more widely spoken Ilocano and Pangasinan languages.

== Distribution and dialects ==
Ibanag is spoken in various areas of the Northeastern Philippines, but principally in the provinces of Isabela and Cagayan; there are minor differences between these areas in the way that Ibanag is spoken. Ibanag spoken in Tuguegarao, the capital of Cagayan (the northernmost of the two provinces), is considered the standard dialect. Native speakers of Ibanag are usually able to determine by pronunciation and accent whether another speaker is from Tuguegarao.

In Tuguegarao, before the arrival of the Spanish, the language predominantly spoken was Irraya, which is now an almost-extinct dialect of Gaddang. The Spanish introduced Ibanag to the city from Lal-lo (formerly the city of Nueva Segovia) and established the language as the lingua franca of the Northeastern Philippines. However, since the introduction of Ilocano settlers in the late 20th century, Ilocano has supplanted Ibanag as the region's common language.

As Ibanag was the lingua franca of Northeast Philippines, many native speakers of Gaddang, Itawis, Agta, Atta, Yogad, Isneg, Malaweg, and even Ilocano speak it.

Ibanag speakers who originate from Cauayan and Ilagan, the two major cities of Isabela Province, have a "hard" accent, whereas the form of Ibanag spoken in Tuguegarao is alleged to have a Hispanic quality. However, speakers of Ibanag from Northern Cagayan have a more complex accent. As an example, Ibanang speakers from towns in Northern Cagayan, which includes Abulug, Aparri, Camalaniugan, Pamplona, as well as Lal-lo, tend to replace [p] with [f].

- mapatu – mafatu ('hot')
- paggipayan – faggifayan ('a place to put')
- dupo – dufo ('banana')

Additionally, certain Ibanag words exhibit regional variations between the Tuguegarao and Isabela dialects.

Tuguegarao	Isabela	English	Tagalog
Ari ka nga kuman ta illuk.	Kammu nga kumang tu illug.	Don't eat eggs.	Huwag kang kumain ng itlog.

Beyond the distinctive features of urban usages, the main dialects of Ibanag are Southern Ibanag and Northern Ibanag. While Southern Ibanag is commonly considered the standard dialect, Northern Ibanag is considered to be closer to the ancient Pre-Hispanic Ibanag which existed before the more widespread adoption of Ibanag beyond its original home territory in Cagayan. However, Southern Ibanag may have acquired elements from nearby Itawis as well as from Spanish. The form of Southern Ibanag spoken in Isabela may similarly have been influenced by the Gaddang substrate that was originally the dominant language in the areas where Ibanag is currently spoken.

== Archaic Ibanag ==
Some modern Ibanag words, such as innafi 'rice', bavi 'pig', and afi 'fire', are listed in Spanish texts as innafuy, bavuy, and afuy respectively. The modern Ibanag term for the number one, tadday, was once used interchangeably with the word itte, which appears to have fallen out of modern usage.

== Use and current status ==
In October 2012, "revival of the Ibanag culture [was] part of the Mother-Tongue Based (MTB) program of the [Philippine] government which seeks to preserve indigenous cultures, including its languages, for generations to come." Ibanag was also listed as one of the MTB languages being taught in Philippine schools, and two stage plays - Zininaga Ta Bannag ("Heritage of the River") and Why Women Wash the Dishes - were being performed in Ibanag.

== Phonology ==
=== Vowels ===
	Front	Central	Back
Close	i		u
Mid	e	ə	
Open		a	ɔ

Monophthongization of diphthongs is observable in Ibanag. For example, the words umay 'to go', balay 'house' or aggaw 'day' are sometimes pronounced as ume, bale, and aggo respectively.

=== Consonants ===
Ibanag is one of the Philippine languages which do not exhibit the [ɾ]-[d] allophony, they only contrast before consonants and word-final positions; otherwise, they become allophones where [d] is only located in word-initial positions and after consonants & [ɾ] is only pronounced between vowels. In Spanish & Ilocano loanwords, [d] and [ɾ] contrast in all word positions. Ibanag features phonemes that are not present in many related Philippine languages; phonemes unique to Ibanag compared to its sister languages include [f] as in innafi, 'rice', [v] as in bavi, 'pig', [z] as in kazzing 'goat' and [dʒ] as in madjan 'maid'.

Ibanag features gemination:

- gaddua [ɡadˈdwa] 'half'
- mappazzi [mappazˈzɪ] 'to squeeze, squeezing', kazzing [kazˈzɪŋ] 'goat'

The <rr> is pronounced as alveolar trill [r]. Before consonants and word-final positions, [ɾ] is in free variation with trill [r].

Table of consonant phonemes of Ibanag
		Labial	Alveolar	Palatal	Velar	Glottal
Nasal		m	n	ɲ	ŋ	
Plosive/ Affricate	voiceless	p	t	tʃ	k	ʔ
Plosive/ Affricate	voiced	b	d	dʒ	ɡ	ʔ
Fricative	voiceless	f	s	ʃ		h
Fricative	voiced	v	z			
Tap			ɾ ~ r			
Approximant			l	j	w	

== Orthography ==
There are two principal orthographic conventions for writing Ibanag. Older texts use a spelling influenced by Spanish in which ⟨c⟩, and ⟨qu⟩ are used to represent /k/, and words that end with a glottal stop have -c added to the end of the word. The more modern method of writing Ibanag is both simpler and tends to be more phonetic.

"Spanish style"	Modern Style	English
quiminac cami tab bavi	kiminak kami tu bavi	'we ate pork'
napannu tac cunam y langui-c	Napannu tu kunam i langi	'the sky is full of clouds'

The modern orthographic system for writing Ibanag is consistent with the conventions of Filipino, as well as other languages such as Bisaya and Ilocano, in which silent letters are omitted. The modern orthographic system has similarly been adopted for use in public schools for the purpose of the Department of Education's Mother Tongue-Based Multilingual Education policy in Ibanag-speaking areas and is prescribed by the Ibanag Heritage Foundation, Inc.

== Grammar ==
=== Pronouns ===
Person	Number	Pronoun	English	Possessive pronouns	Example of root word	Example of derived word(s)
1st	singular	Sakan, sakang (Isabela) So'	I / my	-ku, -' (when the noun ends with a vowel or diphthong)	kazzing 'goat' lima 'hand'	kazzing ku 'my goat' lima' 'my hand'
1st	plural	Sikami (exclusive) Sittam, sittang (Isabela - inclusive)	we / our	-mi, -tam	libru 'book'	libru mi 'our book' libru tam 'our book'
2nd	singular	Sikaw	you / your	-mu, -m	mejas 'socks' libru 'book'	mejas mu 'your socks' librum 'your book'
2nd	plural	Sikamu	you / your (formal)	-nu	bandera 'flag'	bandera nu 'your flag'
3rd	singular	Yayya, yatun	he / his she / her it / its	-na	manu' 'chicken'	manu' na 'his / her / its chicken'
3rd	plural	Ira	they / their	-da	itubang 'chair'	itubang da 'their chair'

==== Subject Pronouns ====
Ibanag is agglutinative, and pronouns are generally attached to verbs as enclitics.

===== Sakan/So' (1sg.) =====
There are at least four ways to indicate the first-person pronoun.

- 'I am eating': Kuman na' = kuman 'to eat' and na' 'I'. Sometimes, nga' is used instead of na'.
- 'I gave him some food': Neddak ku yayya ta makan = neddan 'to give' and ku 'I'.
- 'I will be the one to go': So' laman ngana y ume = So' 'I'
- 'I split it in half': Ginaddwa' = ginaddwa 'to split in half' and 'I'. Here the glottal stop on the sentence indicates 'I'. Without the glottal stop, the sentence would become incomplete and would otherwise not make any sense.

===== Sikaw (2sg.) =====
- '(You) go outside': Mallawak ka = mallawan 'to go' and ka 'you'
- 'You give': Iddammu = iddan 'to give/to put' and mu 'you'

===== Yayya (3sg.) =====
The third-person singular pronoun typically takes the form na.

- 'He lost it': Nawawan na = nawawan 'lost' and na 'he/she/it' (Note: without the glottal stop, na can mean 'he', 'she', or 'it'.)

==== Sittam / sittang (1pl. - inclusive) ====
Sittam becomes -tam or -tang when attached to the end of the verb or noun.

- 'Let us go': Tam ngana!/Ettang ngana! (Isabela) or Ume tam!

==== Sikami (1pl. - exclusive) ====
To exclude the person being spoken to, Sikami is used. In this case, -mi is attached to the end of the verb, adjective, or noun.

- 'We are going to look': Ume mi nga innan = ume 'to go' and mi 'we'
- 'We are full' (as in food): Nabattug kami = nabattug 'full', kami 'we' (excl.)
- 'We are Ibanags': Ibanag kami

==== Sikamu (2pl. - inclusive) ====
Both -nu and -kamu are used:

- 'Go get him/her': Apannu yayya! = apan 'to get' and nu 'you'
- 'You went there?': Uminé kamu tari? = umine 'went' and kamu 'you'

==== Ira (3pl.) ====
Ira is rarely used unless firmly indicating the persons denoted. Instead of ira, the word da is used.

- 'They bought my house': Ginatang da y bale' = ginatang 'bought', da 'they'

=== Possessive pronouns ===
The word kua, when used in conjunction with the first-person or second-person plural personal pronouns, marks possession, and the prefix ku- may be added to kua to emphasise possession.

'That IS mine.': Kukua' yatun

- 'My, mine': ku, kua', kukua'
- 'Me': tanyo'
- 'Your, yours': -m, mu, kuam, kukuam
- 'His, her, its': na, kuana
- 'Our, ours' (inclusive): tam, kuatam
- 'Our, ours' (exclusive): mi, kuami
- 'Your, yours': nu, kuanu
- 'Their, theirs': da, kuada
- 'My toy': gaggayam
- 'Your gift': regalum
- 'Her earring': aritu' na
- 'His scissors': garsib na
- 'Our land': davvut tam
- 'Our house': balay mi
- 'Your car': coche nu
- 'Their dog': kitu da
- 'This is mine': kua' yaw
- 'This is hers/his': kukua/kua na yaw
- 'That is yours': kuam yatun
- 'That is hers': kuana yari/kuana yatung

=== Demonstrative pronouns ===
- 'This': yaw, ye, yawe
- 'That' (item by person being spoken to): yatun or yane (Isabela)
- 'That' (far from both speaker and person being spoken to): yari or yore
- 'That' (sometimes used for objects that are absent or in the past): yuri
- 'This dog': ye kitu
- 'That cat': yane kitaw
- 'That carabao': yari nuang
- 'That day': yuri aggaw

In order to emphasise the spatial or temporal distance encoded in the demonstrative pronoun, the first syllable in the pronoun, other than in yatun, as yatun davvun ('that land'), may be stressed by the speaker.

=== Locatives ===
- 'Here': taw or tawe
- 'There': tatun (by person being spoken to)
- 'There': tari (far from both)
- 'There': turi (absent, past time and location)

Locatives may also serve to emphasise distance.

- 'THIS house' (here): ye balay taw
- 'That girl there': yatun babay tatun
- 'That man over there': yari lalaki tari
- 'That old lady a long time ago': yuri bako' turi*

When the word turi is used, the stress on tu is often lengthened to emphasise the distance and time that has passed.

- Tadday nga aggaw – Tagalog: Isang araw – English: One day
- Tadday vulan – Tagalog: Isang buwan – English: One month
- Tadday nga dagun/ragun – Tagalog: Isang taon – English: One year

=== Interrogative Words ===
- 'What?': anni?
- 'When?': nikanni?
- 'Where?': sitaw?
- 'Who?': sinni?
- 'Why?': ngatta?
- 'How?': kunnasi?
- 'How much?': piga?

Each of the doubled consonants must be pronounced separately – i.e. anni? – an ni

- 'What are you doing?': Anni kuammu?
- 'When did you arrive?': Kanni labbe' mu?
- 'Where are we going?': Sitaw angayat tam?
- 'Who took my fan?': Sinni nanga' ta affefec ku?
- 'Why are you not eating?': Ngatta nga ari ka kuman?
- 'How are you going to cook that if you do not have the ingredients?': Kunnasim lutuan yatun nu awan tu rekadum?
- 'How much is this? How much is that?': Piga yaw? Piga yatun?

== Verbs ==
Ibanag verbs are conjugated on the basis of tense but not person. Like most other Malayo-Polynesian languages, Ibanag does not have a copula, which means there is no equivalent to English verb 'to be'. However, the Ibanag verb egga meaning 'to have' can perform a copulative function.

=== Infinitive and present tense ===
The infinitive form of the verb is often the same as the present tense.

- 'There is'/'to have': egga
- 'To eat/eat': kuman
- 'To drink/drink': minum
- 'To need/need': mawag
- 'To want/want', 'to like/like': kaya'
- 'To go/go', 'to come/come': umay
- 'To not want/not want', 'to not like/not like': manaki'
- 'I am here': Egga nga tawe
- 'Do you eat goat?': Kumak ka tu kazzing?
- 'Drink this': Inumang mu/inumammu yaw.
- 'Drink water': Uminum/mininum/mininung ka tu danum/danung.
- 'You need to sleep': Mawag mu makkaturug.
- 'To ask': mangiyavu

=== Past tense ===
There are multiple ways to form the past tense.

- 'Cooked': nilutu/nallutu
- 'Cut': ginappo'
- 'Cut (hair)': inusi'
- 'Placed far away': inirayyu
- 'Bought': ginatang
- 'We cooked dinengdeng': Nallutu kami tu dinengdeng
- 'We cooked the pig': Nilutu mi yari bavi. (Y becomes yari assuming the pig itself is not present since it was already cooked)
- 'They cut my hair': Inusi' da y vu' ku.
- 'I got my hair cut': Nappa usi' na' tu vu' ku.
- 'They placed him far away': Inirayyu da yayya.
- 'I bought you this cow': Ginatang ku yaw baka para nikaw/niko.

=== Future tense ===
The principal method of forming the future tense is by using an auxiliary verb such as 'to go'. The present tense can also imply the future in certain circumstances.

- 'We are going to pick him up.': Apam mi ngana yayya
- 'Go buy lechon later.': Sonu manannwang ka na gumatang tu lichon or Sonu bibbinnay ka na matang tu lichon (Isabela), Sonu mangananwan ka ngana gumatang ta lechon. (Tuguegarao)

==== Sangaw and Sangawe ====
- 'Do it now': Sangaw ngana! (Sangawe not used in Tuguegarao)
- 'Do it now': Sangawe ngana! (Isabela)
- 'Later on': Sonu mangananwan!, Sonu bibbinnay

== Structure ==
=== Syntax and word order ===
Ibanag sentence structure tends to follow verb–subject–object word order.

- 'Andoy took out the dog.': Nellawan ni Andoy y kitu.

Adjectives tend to precede nouns with a marker attached.

- 'The house is red': Uzzin y balay
- 'The red house': Uzzin nga balay

=== Markers ===
Y and nga are the two most commonly used markers in Ibanag. They either link adjectives to nouns or indicate the subject of the sentence. Y performs a copulative function, while nga indicates adjectival description.

- 'Loud laughter': Nagallu nga galo'. Nagallu indicates 'loud' and the nga links it to laughter.
- 'Your child is tall.': Atannang y ana' mu. With the lack of the verb to be and a switched syntax, y indicates that your child is the subject.

The marker tu is also used, but its usage is complex. It often is seen in conjunction with the word awan, meaning 'nothing, none'.

- 'There is nothing to eat': Awan tu makan – Tagalog: Wala nang pagkain. Here, tu links awan ('none') and makan ('food'). Tu is like nang in Tagalog.

Ta is yet another marker used. Ta is like sa in Tagalog.

- 'Make a new chair.': Maggangwa ka ta bagu nga silla. – Tagalog: Gagawa ka ng bagong upuan. (Here both nga and ta are used)

==== Tu and ta in the Isabela dialect ====
Ta is used to refer to place in the Isabela and Tuguegarao dialects.

Example: 'We went to Tuguegarao.': Minay kami ta Tuguegarao.

Tu is used to refer to things.

Example: 'We ate pork.' Kiminang kami tu bavi. (Isabela)

=== Sandhi ===
Ibanag verbs that end in n omit the last consonant, which is replaced by the first consonant of the next word - unless the next word starts with a vowel or another n, in which case the final n is not affected.

Examples:

- *Apan mu yari libru.

Correct: Apam mu yari libru 'Go get the book.'

- *Nasingan ku y yama na.

Correct: Nasingak ku y yama na 'I saw his father.'

The marker ta and the preposition na (not the pronoun) can, depending on the dialect in use, acquire the first consonant of the succeeding word.

- Ta likuk/likug na balay

Tal likuk nab balay 'at the back of the house'

- Ta utun 'on top.' Note that ta is succeeded by utun, which starts with a vowel.

== Examples ==
=== Proverbs ===
Ibanag	Tagalog	English
Y tolay nga/tu ari nga/amme* na mallipay ta pinaggafangan na ay ari nga/amme na makadde ta angayanan na.(*Isabela)	Ang taong Hindi marunong lumingon sa pinanggalingan ay Hindi makakarating sa paroroonan.	He who does not look back into his past, cannot reach his destination.
Ta langi awan tu binarayang, yatun ta utun na davvun ittam minum.	Sa langit walang alak, kaya sa ibabaw ng lupa dapat tayo'y lumaklak.	In heaven there is no beer, that is why we drink it here.
Ari mu kagian nga piyyo ngana y illuk tapenu ari nga magivung. (Tuguegarao) Ammeng kagim tu piyyo ngana y illug tapenu ari nga magivung. (Isabela)	Huwag mong sabihing sisiw na ang itlog para Hindi ito maging bugok.	Never call an egg a chick, so that it will not become rotten.

=== Cagayan provincial anthem ===
Cagayan, Davvun nga kakastan niakan,
Egga ka laran nakuan ta piam,
Nu kuruk tu maparrayyu ka niakan,
Ariat ta ka vuluvvuga nga kattamman.

Cagayan, Makemmemmi ka nga innan.
Cagayan, Awan tu kagittam.
Nu anni paga y kasta na davvun a karuan
Egga ka la ta futu' nga ideddukan.

Translation:

Cagayan, a beautiful land to me,
You have done great things,
If it were true that you will be away from me,
I will not intently forget you.

Cagayan, I adore looking at you,
Cagayan, you are incomparable.
Even if other lands are beautiful,
You are in my heart to be loved.

The direct translation provided here is not the official English version of the Cagayan Provincial Anthem.

== Vocabulary ==
=== Loan words ===
Many words in Ibanag are of Spanish origin, and certain Spanish loanwords in Ibanag are not commonly used in any of the other Philippine languages.

- Eyeglasses: anchuparra/anteojos
- Plants: masetas
- Store: chenda (from Spanish: tienda)
- Door: puerta
- Toilet: kasilyas
- Quickly, immediately: insigida (from en seguida)

Other loanwords are from Ilocano, as it replaced Ibanag as the lingua franca of Cagayan Valley, making Ilocano the lingua franca of North Luzon.

=== Simple greetings ===
- Good morning: Dios nikamu ta umma (others say Mapia nga umma)
- Good afternoon: Dios nikamu ta fugak (others say Mapia nga fugak)
- Good evening/night: Dios nikamu ta gabi (others say Mapia nga gabi)
- How are you?: Kunnasi ka?
- I am fine/good, and you?: Mapia so' gapa, sikaw?
- I am just fine, thank God: Mapia so' gapa, mabbalo' ta Afu
- Thank you: Mabbalo'
- Where are you going?: Sitaw y angayammu?
- I am going to...: Umay na' ta...
- What are you doing?: Anni kukuam mu?
- Nothing in particular: Awan, maski anni laman.
- Please come in: Tullung kamu, Maddulo kamu or Mattalung kamu.
- Long time no see: Nabayag taka nga ari nasingan.

=== Numbers ===
- 0: awan
- 1: tadday
- 2: duwa
- 3: tallu
- 4: appa'
- 5: lima
- 6: annam
- 7: pitu
- 8: walu
- 9: siyam
- 10: mafulu
- 11: karatadday/onse
- 12: karaduwa/dose
- 13: karatallu/trese
- 14: karappa/katorse
- 15: karalima/kinse
- 20: duwafulu/beinte
- 100: magatu
- 200: duwa gatu
- 500: lima gatu
- 1000: marivu
- 2000: duwa rivu

=== Sentences ===
Ibanag	Tagalog	English
Anni y kinnam mu ganguri?	Ano ang kinain mo kanina?	What did you eat?
Anni y kinnan nu?	Ano ang kinain ninyo?	What did you,(all) eat?
Anni y kanakanam mu?	Ano ang kinakain mo?	What are you eating?
Anni y kankanam mu sangaw?	Ano ang kinakain mo ngayon?	What are you eating now?
Kuman ittam sangaw nu pallabbe na.	Kakain tayo pagdating niya.	We will eat when he/she comes.
Maddaguk kami kuman kustu limibbe yayya.	Kumakain kami nang dumating siya.	We were eating when he came.
Nakakak kami nakwang nu minilubbe yayya.	Nakakain sana kami kung dumating siya.	We would have eaten I if he had arrived.
Natturkí y gattó.	Sumirit ang gatas.	The milk shot out.
Ari ka nga kuman.	Huwag kang kumain.	Don't eat.
Kumak ka ngana!	Kumain ka na!	Eat now!
Kukwa' yatun!	Akin yan!	That's mine!
Iddu taka/ay-ayatat taka	Mahal kita	I love you
