= Batanic languages =

Subgroup of the Austronesian language family

Batanic
- Bashiic, Ivatanic
- Geographic distribution: Batanes and Orchid Island
- Linguistic classification: Austronesian: Malayo-Polynesian; Philippine (?); Batanic

Language codes
- ISO 639-3: –
- Glottolog: bata1315
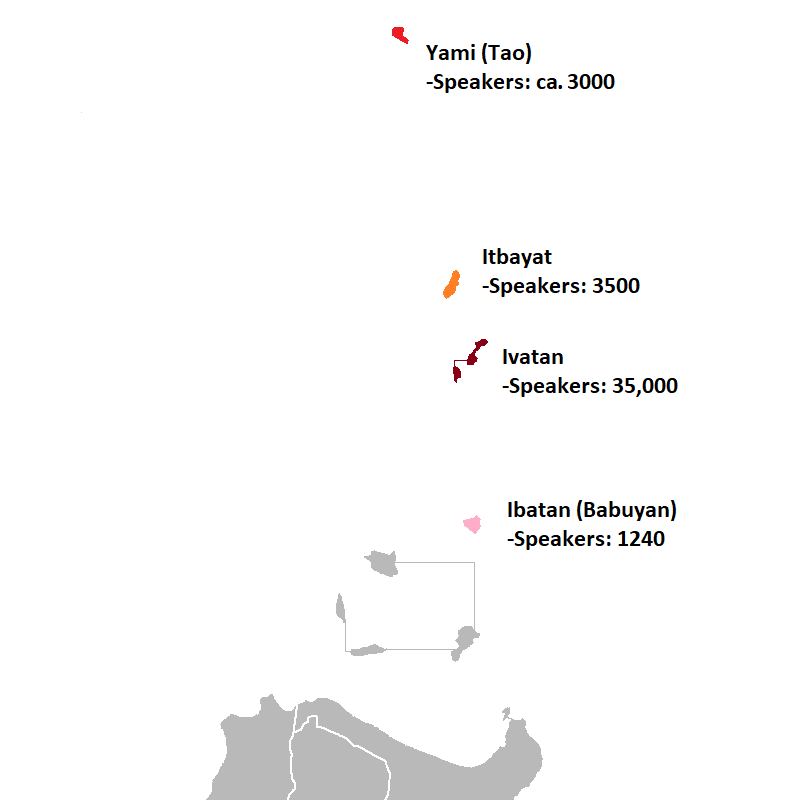
- Geographic distribution of the Batanic languages

The Batanic languages (sometimes also called Bashiic or Ivatanic) are a dialect cluster of the Austronesian language family. They are spoken on Babuyan Island, just north of Luzon; three of the Batanes Islands, between the Philippines and Taiwan; and on Orchid Island of southern Taiwan.

The varieties in the Philippines are called Ivatan (also spelled Ibatan), or are named Babuyan, Batan, or Itbayat after their islands, while the variety of Taiwan is called Yami or Tao.

Proto-Batanic has been reconstructed by Yang (2002).

== Classification ==
Malcolm Ross (2005) and Roger Blench (2015) list four languages:

- Batanic
  - Yami (or Tao) on Orchid Island
    - Imurud dialect
    - Iraralay dialect
    - Iranumilek dialect
  - Itbayat on Itbayat Island
  - Ivatan
    - Ivasay dialect (= Basco Ivatan) on Batan
    - Isamurung dialect (=Southern Ivatan) on Batan (southern part), Sabtang
  - Ibatan (or Babuyan) on the Babuyan Islands

Moriguchi (1983) classifies the Batanic languages as follows.

- Proto-Vasayic
  - Itbayaten
  - Vasay
    - Babuyan, Isamorong
    - Yami: Iraralay, Imorod

According to Paul Jen-kuei Li (2000), Yami is most closely related to Itbayat. Among the Batanic languages, Iraralay is the most conservative.

The Batanic languages are frequently included with the Philippine languages. However, there is no full consensus on this, and some consider them a primary branch of the Malayo-Polynesian languages. Blench concludes that Batanic languages have been splitting from Proto-Malayo-Polynesian for a long time and contain many roots which are not standard Austronesian. The relationship between Batanic and Northern Luzon languages is still uncertain.
