= Yami language =

Austronesian language spoken on Orchid Island, Taiwan

Yami
- Tao
- ciciring no Tao
- Native to: Taiwan
- Region: Orchid Island
- Ethnicity: Tao
- Native speakers: about 4000 (2012)
- Language family: Austronesian: Malayo-Polynesian; Philippine; Batanic; Yami–Itbayat; Yami
- Writing system: Latin (Yami alphabet)

Language codes
- ISO 639-3: tao
- Glottolog: yami1254
- ELP: Tao
- Linguasphere: 31-CAA-a
- Yami language is classified as Definitely endangered by the UNESCO Atlas of the World's Languages in Danger.

- Orchid Island in Taiwan Yami language (Southeast Asia)
- Coordinates: 22°03′N 121°32′E

The Yami language (Chinese: 雅美語), also known as Tao (Chinese: 達悟語), is a Malayo-Polynesian and Philippine language spoken by the Tao people of Orchid Island, 46 kilometers southeast of Taiwan. It is a member of the Ivatan dialect continuum.

Yami is known as ciriciring no Tao 'human speech' by its native speakers. Some native speakers prefer the "Tao" name.

== Classification ==
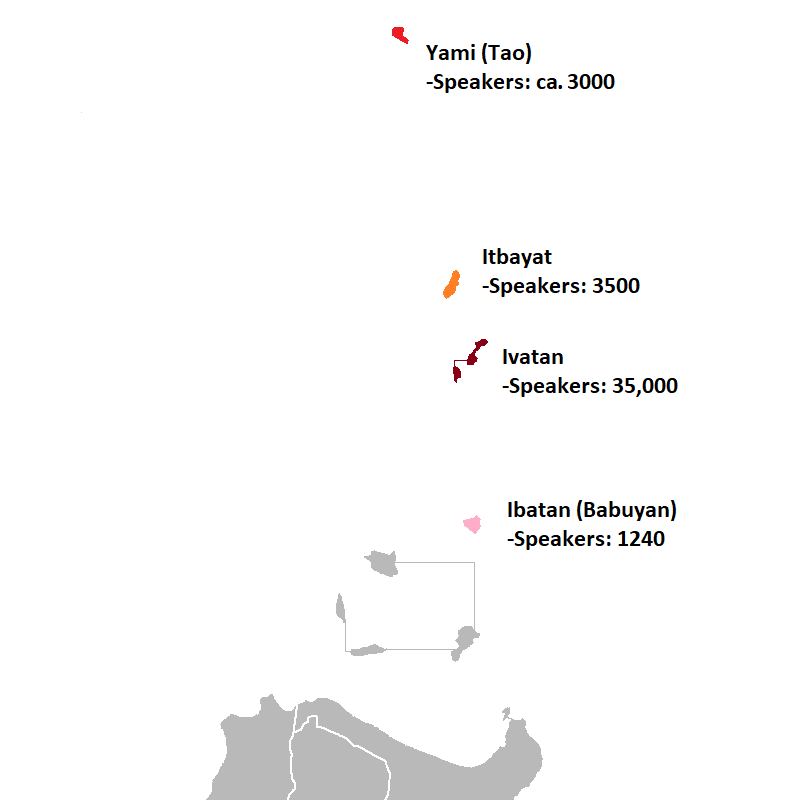
Yami and the other Batanic languages

Yami is the only native language of Taiwanese indigenous peoples that is not a member of the Formosan grouping of Austronesian; it is one of the Batanic languages also found in Batanes province of northern Philippines, and as such is part of the Malayo-Polynesian branch of Austronesian.

== Phonology ==
Yami has 20 consonants and 4 vowels:

=== Vowels ===
	Front	Central	Back
Close	i		
Mid		ə	o
Open		a	

- /o/ can be heard as [ʊ] after labial stop consonants.

Iraralay Yami, spoken on the north coast, distinguishes between geminative consonants (e.g., opa 'thigh' vs. oppa 'hen' form one such minimal pair).

=== Consonants ===
Yami consonants
		Labial	Alveolar	Palatal	Retroflex	Velar	Uvular	Glottal
Nasal		m	n			ŋ		
Plosive/ Affricate	voiceless	p	t	t͡ʃ		k		ʔ
Plosive/ Affricate	voiced	b		d͡ʒ	ɖ	ɡ		
Fricative		v			ʂ		ʁ	
Approximant			l	j	ɻ	w		
Trill			r					

- /k ʁ/ can also be heard as sounds [q ɦ] when between vowel /a/ intervocalically.
- Sounds /n l ʂ/ can be heard as sounds [ɲ ɮ ʃ] before /i/.

== Grammar ==
=== Pronouns ===
The following set of pronouns is found in the Yami language.

Yami pronouns
	Nominative		Genitive		Locative
	free	bound	free	bound	Locative
1st person singular	yaken	ko	niaken	ko	jiaken
2nd person singular	imo	ka	nimo	mo	jimo
3rd person singular	iya	ya	nia	na	jia
1st person plural inclusive	yaten	ta, tamo, takamo	niaten	ta	jiaten
1st person plural exclusive	yamen	namen	niamen	namen	jiamen
2nd person plural	inio	kamo, kanio	ninio	nio	jinio
3rd person plural	sira	sia	nira	da	jira

=== Verbs ===
The following list are verbal inflections found in Yami.

Dynamic intransitive

- -om-/om- (subjunctive: N-)
- mi-
- ma-
- maN-
- maka-
- maci-/masi-/macika-/macipa-

Stative

- ma- (subjunctive: a-)
- ka- ... -an (subjunctive: ka- ... -i)

Dynamic

- pi-
- pa-
- paN- (subjunctive: maN-)
- paka- (subjunctive: maka-)
- paci- (subjunctive: maci-)

Transitive

- -en (subjunctive: -a)
- -an (subjunctive: -i)
- i- (subjunctive: -an)

Stative functioning as transitive

- ma- (subjunctive: a- ... -a)
- ka- ... -an (subjunctive: a- ... -a)

=== Affixes ===
The following is a list of affixes found in Yami.

- icia- 'fellows such and such who share the same features or fate'
- ikeyka- 'even more so'
- ika- 'feel such and such because...'
- ika- 'ordinal number'
- ipi- 'multiple number'
- ji a- 'negation or emphatic'
- ka- 'company, as ... as, abstract noun'
- ka- 'and then, just now, only'
- ka- 'stative verb prefix reappearing in forming transitive verbs'
- ka- (reduplicated root) 'very'
- ka- (reduplicated root) 'animals named after certain features'
- ka- ... -an 'common noun'
- ma- ... -en 'love to do such and such'
- mapaka- 'pretend to be such and such'
- mapi- 'do such and such as an occupation'
- mi-/mala- 'kinship relationships in a group of two or three'
- mika-/mapika-/ipika- 'all, gradually, one by one'
- mala- 'taste or look like...'
- mipa- 'getting more and more...'
- mipipa- 'even more...'
- mapi-/mapa-/pa- ... -en/ipa- 'causative verb affixes'
- ni- 'perfective'
- ni- ... na 'superlative'
- noka- 'past'
- noma- 'future (remote)'
- sicia- 'present'
- sima- 'future (proximal)'
- tey- 'direction'
- tey- 'very, too'
- tey- (reduplicated root) 'amount allocated to each unit

== Vocabulary ==
=== Cognates with Philippine languages ===
English	Yami	Tagalog/Ilokano/Visayan, etc.
Person	tao	tao (Tagalog), tawo (Cebuano Vis., Bikol)
Mother	ina	ina (Tagalog)
Father	ama	ama (Tagalog), ama (Ilokano)
Head	oo	ulo (Tagalog), ulu (Cebuano), olo (Ilokano)
Yes	nohon	oho (Pandan Bikol, Bikol Sentral)
Friend	kagagan	kaibigan (Tagalog)
who	sino	sino, sin-o (Hiligaynon Vis.), hin-o (Waray Vis.)
they	sira	sila (Tagalog), sira/hira (Waray Vis.)
their	nira	nila (Tagalog)
offspring	anak	anak (Cebuano Vis.), anak (Hiligaynon Vis.), anak (Ilokano), anak (Tagalog)
I (pronoun)	ko	ko, -ko (Ilokano)
you	ka	ka, -ka (Ilokano)
day	araw	araw, aldaw (Ilokano, Bikol), adlaw (Cebuano Vis.)
eat	kanen	kain, kanen (Ilokano), kaon (all Visayan)
drink	inomen	inumin, inomen (Ilokano)
speech	ciriciring	chirichirin (Itbayaten Ivatan), siling (Hiligaynon Vis., 'say'), siring (Waray Vis., 'say')
and	aka	saka (Bikol Sentral) (historically "saka asin")
ouch	Ananay	Aray, Agay (Cebuano Vis.), Annay (Ilokano)
home	vahay	bahay, balay (Ilokano, Cebuano Vis.)
piglet	viik	biik (Tagalog)
goat	kadling	kambing, kanding (Cebuano Vis.), kalding (Ilokano)
stone	vato	bato (Tagalog, all Visayan, etc.)
town	ili	ili (Ilokano)
one	ása	isa (Tagalog, Hiligaynon Vis.), maysa (Ilokano), usa (Cebuano Vis.)
two	dóa (raroa)	dalawa (Tagalog), duha (Cebuano), dua (Ilokano), duwa (Bikol)
three	tílo	tatlo, tulo/tuto (Cebuano Vis.), tallo (Ilokano)
four	ápat	apat (Tagalog, Hiligaynon Vis.), upat (Cebuano Vis.), uppat (Ilokano)
five	líma	lima (Cebuano Vis.), lima (Hiligaynon Vis.), lima (Ilokano), lima (Tagalog)
six	ánem	anim (Tagalog), innem (Ilokano), unom (Cebuano Vis.), anum (Hiligaynon Vis.)
seven	píto	pito (Tagalog/Ilokano/Visayan)
eight	wáo	walo (Tagalog/Ilokano/Visayan)
nine	síam	siyam (Tagalog/Bikol/Visayan), siam (Ilokano)
ten	póo	sampu (Tagalog), sangapulo (Ilokano), napulo (all Visayan)

=== Japanese loanwords ===
English	Yami	Japanese
Airplane	sikoki	hikouki (飛行機)
Alcohol	saki	sake (酒)
Battleship	gengkang	gunkan (軍艦)
Bible	seysio	seisho (聖書)
Christ	Kizisto	kirisuto (キリスト)
Doctor	koysang	o-isha-san (お医者さん)?
Flashlight	dingki	denki (電気)
Holy Spirit	seyzi	seirei (聖霊)
Key	kagi	kagi (鍵)
Medicine	kosozi	kusuri (薬)
Monkey	sazo	saru (猿)
Motorcycle	otobay	ōtobai (オートバイ; 'auto bike')
Police	kisat	keisatsu (警察)
School	gako	gakkō (学校)
School bag	kabang	kaban (鞄)
Teacher	sinsi	sensei (先生)
Ticket	kipo	kippu (切符)
Truck	tozako	torakku (トラック; 'truck')

=== Chinese loanwords ===
English	Yami	Mandarin Chinese
Wine	potaw cio	pútáojiǔ (葡萄酒)
Volunteer	yi gong	yì gōng (義工)

== See also ==
- Languages of Taiwan
- Taiwanese aborigines
- Tao people
- Batanic languages
- Ivatan language

== Sources ==
- Rau, D. Victoria; Dong, Maa-Neu (2006). 達悟語：語料、參考語法、及詞彙/ Yami Texts with Reference Grammar and Dictionary (PDF) (in Chinese and English). Taipei: Academia Sinica. Archived from the original (PDF) on 2021-10-24.
- Rau, D. Victoria 何德華; Dong, Maa-Neu 董瑪女; Chang, Ann Hui-Huan 張惠環 (2012). Dáwù yǔ cídiǎn / Yami (Tao) Dictionary 達悟語詞典 / Yami (Tao) Dictionary (in Chinese and English). Taibei shi: Guoli taiwan daxue chuban zhongxin. ISBN 978-986-03-2519-5.
- Rau, Der-Hwa 何德華; Dong, Maa-Neu 董瑪女 (2018). Dáwù yǔ yǔfǎ gàilùn 達悟語語法概論 [Introduction to Tao Grammar] (in Chinese). Xinbei shi: Yuanzhu minzu weiyuanhui. ISBN 978-986-05-5695-7. Archived from the original on 2021-11-04 – via alilin.apc.gov.tw.
