= Ivatan language =

Batanic language of the Ivatan people of the Philippines

Ivatan
- Ibatan
- Chirin nu Ibatan
- Native to: Philippines
- Region: Batanes Islands
- Ethnicity: Ivatan
- Native speakers: (33,000 cited 1996–2007)
- Language family: Austronesian: Malayo-Polynesian; Philippine; Batanic; Ivatan
- Dialects: Ivasay; Isamurung; Babuyan

Official status
- Recognised minority language in: Regional language in the Philippines
- Regulated by: Komisyon sa Wikang Filipino

Language codes
- ISO 639-3: Either: ivv – Ivatan ivb – Ibatan (Babuyan)
- Glottolog: ivat1242 Ivatan ibat1238 Ibatan
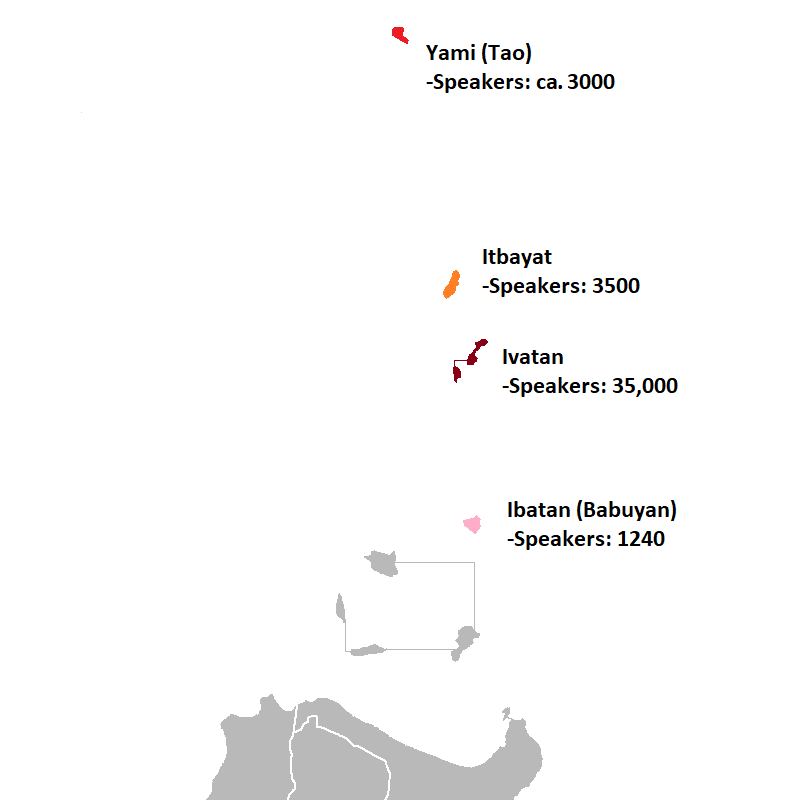
- The location of the Ivatan language within the Batanic languages

The Ivatan language, also known as Chirin nu Ivatan ("language of the Ivatan people"), is an Austronesian language spoken in the Batanes Islands of the Philippines.

Although the islands are closer to Taiwan than to Luzon, it is not one of the Formosan languages. Ivatan is one of the Batanic languages, which are perhaps a primary branch of the Malayo-Polynesian family of Austronesian languages.

The language of Babuyan Island (Ibatan) is sometimes classified as a dialect of the Ivatan language. Most of the Babuyan population moved to Batan Island and to Luzon mainland during the Spanish colonial period. The island became repopulated at the end of the 19th century with families from Batan, most of them speakers of one of the Ivatan dialects.

Ivatan speakers are found outside their homeland, many of them settled in mainland Luzon particularly in nearby Cagayan Valley, Ilocandia, Cordillera Administrative Region, Central Luzon, Metro Manila, Calabarzon, Mindoro and Palawan and also settled as far as Mindanao. In Mindanao, a significant Ivatan-speaking minority exist mainly in Bukidnon, Lanao and Cotabato where they settled since the 1950s in search of economic opportunities settled down in government homesteads in these areas. Nowadays, however, their language has becoming endangered among Ivatan settlers' descendants especially newer generations born in Mindanao, due to being accustomed into a society of Cebuano-speaking majority. Like elsewhere, intermarriage between Ivatans and Mindanaoans of various ethnicities are not uncommon. Most of these Ivatans in Mindanao today speak the majority language of Cebuano, Hiligaynon, Tagalog and other Mindanao indigenous languages more than their ancestors' native language in varying fluency or none at all.

== Introduction ==
Ivatan is especially characterized by its words, which mostly have the letter v, as in vakul, Ivatan, and valuga. While related to the Northern Philippine group of languages, Ivatan, having been isolated, is most close to the two other members of the Bashiic sub-group of languages, Yami (Tao) and Itbayat, neither of which is indigenous to Luzon. Ibatan dialect, spoken on the nearby Babuyan group of islands, is so similar to Ivatan that it is not entirely clear whether it should be classified as a dialect of Ivatan or a separate language, though each does receive its own code in ISO taxonomy.

Ivatan has two dialects; Basco Ivatan, more commonly known as Ivasay, spoken on the main island of Batan, and Southern Ivatan or Isamurung, spoken on the southern half of Batan and on the most southern island, Sabtang.

== Variations in language ==
In the capital of Basco and the surrounding northern half of Batan, the area encompassed by Ivasayen, t is prominent, whereas in the Isamurongen zone to the south (Mahatao, Ivana, Uyugan and Sabtang) that phoneme becomes a ch.

Examples of the more visible variations of the Ivasayen and Isamurongen words and pronunciations are:

- tiban ('to look') in Basco is chiban in the southern towns
- antiyaw ('later') in Basco is anchiyaw in the southern towns
- kabatiti ('patola') in Basco is kabachichi in the southern towns
- timoy ('rain') in Basco is chimoy in the southern towns

Itbayaten is sometimes also considered a dialect. 2% of the total vocabulary does not occur in Ivatan dialects. Examples of different Ivasayen, Isamurongen and Itbayaten words that have the same English translation:

- adkan ('to kiss') in Basco and the southern towns is umahan in Itbayat.
- arava ('none') in Basco and the southern towns is aralih in Itbayat.
- bago ('pig') in Basco and the southern towns is kuyis in Itbayat.
- otioyan ('nest') in Basco is ochoyan in the southern towns and hangtay in Itbayat.
- ipes ('tail') in Basco is vochivot in the southern towns and also ipes in Itbayat.

Ivatan and Filipino words are sometimes combined, as in the Ivatan word mapatak. It is derived from marunong (Filipino) and chapatak (Ivatan), literally 'someone who knows', which were then compounded to form the word mapatak. This is the result of the influence of non-Ivatans who tend to speak the language and were then eventually adopted.

Examples of metathesis in Ivatan include iskarayla for iskalayra ('stairs') and tumaraya for tumayara ('going up').

Ivatan slang includes examples such as tanchew, coined from mirwa ta anchiyaw – literally 'we’ll meet again later', and nganmu, coined from jinu ngayan mu, literally 'where are you going'. These are results of shortening Ivatan phrases or sentences into one or two words, depending on usage.

Common Ivatan expressions have various origins such as:

- Dios mamajes or Dios Mamajes nu mapia
  Literally: 'God reward you with goodness' or 'God bless you'
  Usage: Used to show gratitude to someone
- Dios mavidin
  Literally: 'May God remain with you'
  Usage: Used by the person who is leaving
- Dios machivan
  Literally: 'May God go with you'
  Usage: Used by the person who is staying behind

== Phonology ==
Vowels of Ivatan
	Front	Central	Back	
Close	i		ɯ	u
Mid			o	
Open		a		

/u/ can also be lowered to [ʊ]. Vowel [e] only occurs in loanwords from Spanish, Ilocano, and Tagalog.

Consonants of Ivatan
		Labial	Alveolar	Palatal	Velar	Glottal
Nasal		m	n	ɲ	ŋ	
Plosive/ Affricate	voiceless	p	t	tʃ	k	ʔ
Plosive/ Affricate	voiced	b	d	dʒ	ɡ	ʔ
Fricative		v	s		ɣ	h
Approximant			l	j	w	
Tap			ɾ			

/h/ can also be heard as a velar fricative [x]. Ivatan is one of the Philippine languages that do not exhibit [ɾ]-[d] allophony.

== Grammar ==
=== Pronouns ===
The following set of pronouns is found in the Ivatan language.

			Nominative		Genitive		Locative
			free	bound	free	bound	Locative
1st person	singular		yaken	'ako	niaken	ko	diaken
1st person	plural	exclusive	yamen	kami	niamen	namen	diamen
1st person	plural	inclusive	yaten	ta	niaten	ta	diaten
2nd person	singular		'imo	'ka	nimo	mo	dimo
2nd person	plural		'inio	kamo	ninio	nio	dinio
3rd person	singular		sia	sia	nia	na	dia
3rd person	plural		sira/sa	sira/sa	nira	da	dira

== Cultural terms of the Ivatan people ==
- uve, uvi, sudi – yam; staple crop
- sudi – taro
- wakay – sweet potato
- bulyas – onions
- baka – cow
- kaddin – goat
- kayvayvanan – friendship; cooperative work by a community which starts at the blow of a shell horn called a vodiadong
- payohoan – helping one another; work club of teenagers who alternate their shifts
- faluwa; chinarem; tataya – three boats used for fishing
- kabbata – legends
- laji – lyric folk songs
- kalusan – working songs
- sisyavak – humorous anecdotes and tales
- kabbuni – riddles
- pananahan – proverbs
- vachi – song leader
- mais – corn
- paray – rice plant
- dukay – lesser yam
- rakarakanen – vegetables
- hagsa – an extinct wild deer
- vulaw a bagu – wild boar
- tatus – coconut crabs
- lakasan – tops of wooden trunks used for storing cloth and other valuables which serve as benches
- dulang – low dining table
- bangku – low bench
- rahaung, camarin – a storeroom for larger farm equipment such as plows, harrows, sleds, cards, and the ox-drawn pole used for clearing off sweet potatoes and other vines from fields being prepared for re-cultivation
- vuyavuy – Phoenix loureiroi, a small palm growing usually on Batanes coastal hills
- talugung – a kind of conical hat woven from strips made from the stalk of a local plant called nini
- pasikin – small bamboo or rattan baskets worn on the back
- lukoy – bolo knife
- suhut – sheath of a bolo knife
- suut, vakul – a head-and-back covering woven from the stripped leaves of banana or the vuyavuy
- alat – baskets
- batulinaw – a necklace made of hollow globules (1½ cm. in diameter) interspersed with smaller pieces of gold in floral patterns and held together by a string made of fiber
- tamburin – an all-gold necklace whose beads are smaller and more ornate than the batulinaw, and lockets
- seseng, pamaaw, chingkakawayan, liyano, de pelo, dima s'bato, pitu s'bato, de perlas, bumbolya, karakol, pinatapatan – traditional earrings that come from the Spanish period
- angang – jars
- dibang – flying fish
- payi – lobster
- arayu – dorado
- mataw – dorado fisherman
- tipuho – breadfruit
- uhango – pandan
- tamidok – fern
- chayi – fruit similar to lychee Pometia Pinnata
- soot – generic term referring to the Ivatan rain cape made from the finely stripped leaves of the vuyavuy palm.
- vakul – woman's soot, worn on the head.
- kanayi – man's soot, worn on the shoulders.
- falowa – Ivatan boat, now usually motorized, for 10–20 passengers.
- tataya – Ivatan dory with twin oars, for 2–4 passengers.
- timban/chimban – church
- vanuwa – port
- avayat – a broad directional term used to indicate the west, a western direction or the western side.
- valugan – a broad directional term sued to indicate the east, an eastern direction or the eastern side.
- palek – sugar cane wine
- malisto – fast
- mawadi – slow
- mavid – beautiful
- kuman – eat
- minem – drink
- bapor, tataya – boat
- taw – sea
- ranum – water
- salawsaw – wind
- kayvan – friend
- mahakay – man
- mavakes – woman
- masalawsaw – windy
- makuhat – hot
- matimuy/machimuy – raindrops

== Phrases ==
- Hello – Kapian capa nu dios
- How are you? – Ara ca mangu?
- I am fine – Taytu aco a mapia
- I am not fine – Ara coava mapia
- Thank you – Dios mamajes
- Where are you going? – Ngayan mo?
- I am going to... – Mangay aco du...
- Where is ___? – Ara dino si ___?
- Straight ahead – Direcho
- How much? – Manyi Pira?
- How many? – Pira?
- Good – Mapia
- No good – Mapia/Mavid ava
- Yes – Oon
- I want ___ – Makey ako no ___
- I don't want – Makey aco ava
- I have a problem – Mian problema ko
- No problem – Arava o problema
- Good luck – Mapia palak
- What's your name? – Angu ngaran mo?
- Where is the house of ___? – Jino vahay da ___?
- There – du nguya, du daw, dawri
- Here – diaya
- Hungry – mapteng
- Thirsty – ma-waw
- Tired – mavanah, chinagagan (south), navanax
- Happy – masuyot, masaray
- Whistling – mamito, mihiñoxay (Itbayat)
- Soft – mahma, maxma & mayuxma (Itbayat)
- Sea – taw, hawa (Itbayat)
- Bird – manumanok, kangkang (Itbayat)
- Perpendicular – maybatbat, mipatinu-nong (Itbayat)
- Mud – hetek, xetek (Itbayat)
- Yesterday – kakuyab
- Afternoon – makuyab
- When are we going? – Antin mangu ta mangay?
- When are you going to cut your hair? – Antin mangu ka mapagugud?

== Ivatan words ==
=== Etymology ===
Coined words are two words combined to form one new word.

Sentence	Coined word	Meaning	Usage
Mirwa ta anchiyaw	Tanchew	We'll meet again later.	Street language
Jinu ngayan mu	Nganmu	Where are you going?	Street language

=== Similarities with other Philippine languages ===
	Person	House	Dog	Coconut	Day	New
Ivatan	Tawu	Vahay	Chitu	Niyuy	Araw	Va-yu
Tagalog	Tao	Bahay	Aso	Niyog	Araw	Bago
Bikol	Tawo	Harong	Ayam	Niyog	Aldaw	Ba-go
Cebuano	Tawo	Balay	Iro	Lubi	Adlaw	Bag-o
Tausug	Tau	Bay	Iru'	Niyug	Adlaw	Ba-gu
Kinaray-a	Taho	Balay	Ayam	Niyog	Adlaw	Bag-o
Kapampangan	Tau	Bale	Asu	Ngungut	Aldo	Bayu
Pangasinan	Too	Abong	Aso	Niyog	Agew	Balo
Ilocano	Tao	Balay	Aso	Niog	Aldaw	Baro
Gaddang	Tolay	Balay	Atu	Ayog	Aw	Bawu
Tboli	Tau	Gunu	Ohu	Lefo	Kdaw	Lomi
Waray	Tawo	Balay	Ayam	Lubi	Adlaw	Bag-o

=== Similarities with the Tao language ===
	Day	Home	Friend	Eat	Drink
Ivatan	Araw	Vahay	Cayvan	Kuman	Minom
Yami 雅美/達悟	Araw	Vahay	Kagagan	Kuman	Minum

=== Accommodation ===
	Room	Mail	Water	Time
Ivasayen	Cuarto	Tulas	Danum	Oras
Itbayaten	Cuarto	Turas	Ranum	Uras

=== Approval and disapproval ===
	Good	Of course	Ok	Pretty	Yes	No	Nothing	Perhaps
Ivasayen	Mapia	Siyempre	Okay	Mavid	Oon	Omba	Arava	Siguro
Itbayaten	Map'pia	Siyempri	Na uh	Mavij / Mavig	Uwen	Engga	Aralih / Aral	Siguru

=== Colors ===
	Black	Blue	Brown	Dark	Gray	Green	Light	Red	White	Yellow
Ivasayen	Mavajeng	Maanil	Chocolati	Masari	Mavuavo	Berde	Marial	Mavaya	Maydac	Mañujama
Itbayaten	Mavaweng	Um'anianil	Um'yutana	Masarih	Um'avu-avo	Marèm	Marengang	Mavayah	Mahilak	Mayuxama / Umyuxama

=== Days of the week ===
	Sunday	Monday	Tuesday	Wednesday	Thursday	Friday	Saturday
Ivasayen	Domingo	Lunis	Martis	Miyirkolis	Juibis	Biyernis	Sabado
Itbayaten	Lumingu	Lunis	Martis	Mirkulis	Juybis	Birnis	Sabalu

=== Direction ===
	Left	Right	Straight ahead
Ivasayen	Huli	Wanan	Diricho
Itbayaten	Guri	Wanan	Diricho

=== Cardinal numbers ===
	Zero	One	Two	Three	Four	Five	Six	Seven	Eight	Nine	Ten
Ivayasen	Siro, abu	Asa	Dadua	Tatdu	Apat	Dadima	Anem	Papito	Wawajo	Sasyam	Sapujo
Itbayaten	Siro, a'bu	A'sa	Daduha	Atlu	A'pat	Lalima	A'nem	Pito	Waxo	Sasyam	Sapuxu

== Writing system ==
Ivatan is written using the Latin alphabet. As Ivatan is primarily a spoken language and seldom used in written form, there is currently no consistent way of writing the language and different conventions may be used by different writers. An orthography devised for use in public schools by the Department of Education uses the full 26-letter Latin alphabet, with three extra letters, ch, ñ, and ng.

The schwa sound, or uh, is normally represented by the letter e as in Dios Mamajes, 'di-yos-ma-ma-huhs', and palek 'pa-luhk'.
