= Sorsogon language =

Sorsogon language may refer to:

- Northern Sorsogon language, an Austronesian language spoken in the Philippines
- Southern Sorsogon language, an Austronesian language spoken in the Philippines
