= Itbayat language =

Austronesian language spoken in the Philippines

Itbayatèn
- Ichbayaten
- Ichbayaten
- Native to: Philippines
- Region: Itbayat Island
- Ethnicity: Ivatan people
- Native speakers: (3,500 cited 1996 census)
- Language family: Austronesian: Malayo-Polynesian; Batanic; Itbayatèn Language–Itbayat; Itbayatèn

Language codes
- ISO 639-3: –
- Glottolog: itba1237
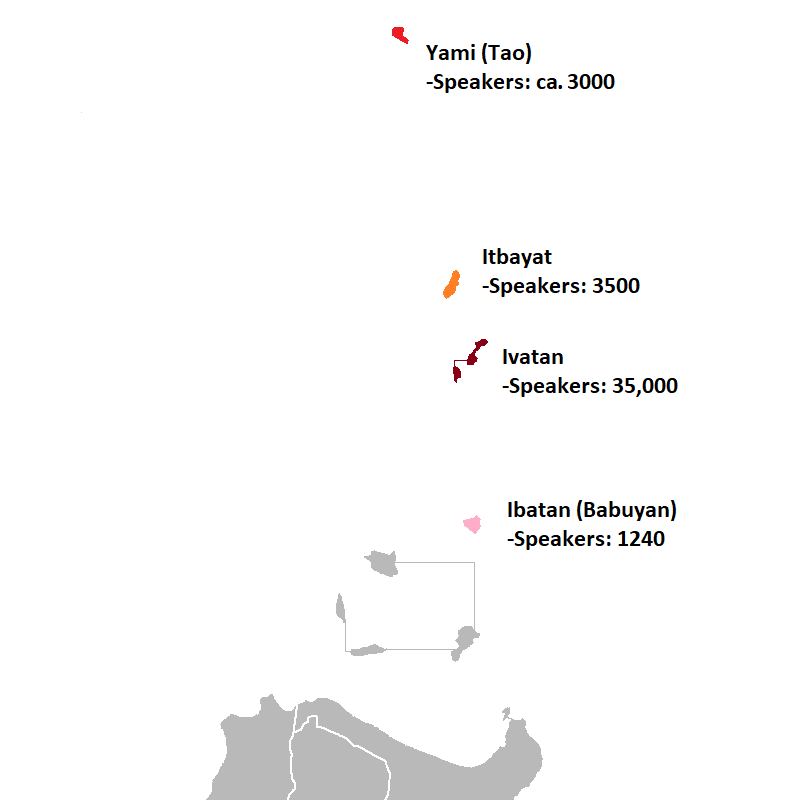
- Itbayat and the other Batanic languages

The Itbayat language or Itbayaten (also known locally by elders as Ichbayaten) is an Austronesian language, in the Batanic group. It is spoken primarily in Itbayat, a municipality in Batanes, Philippines.

== Phonology ==
=== Vowels ===
/a, ɜ, i, o/

Vowels are contrasted between long and short vowels, for example as seen in the words tokod ('support') and tookod ('a kind of yam').

=== Consonants ===
Itbayat consonants
		Labial	Alveolar	Palatal	Velar	Uvular	Glottal
Nasal		m	n	ɲ	ŋ		
Plosive/ Affricate	voiceless	p	t	t͡ʃ	k		ʔ
Plosive/ Affricate	voiced	b	d	d͡ʒ	ɡ		ʔ
Fricative	voiceless	(f)	s				h
Fricative	voiced	v			ɣ	ʁ	
Approximant			l	j	w		
Trill			r				

- /f/ is only used in loanwords but tends to become /p/.

== Grammar ==
=== Pronouns ===
The following set of pronouns is found in the Itbayat language.

Itbayat pronouns
			Nominative		Genitive		Locative
			free	bound	free	bound	Locative
1st person	singular		yaken	ako	ñaken	ko	jaken
1st person	dual		–	ta	–	–	–
1st person	plural	inclusive	yaten	ta	ñaten	ta	jaten
1st person	plural	exclusive	yamen	kami	ñamen	namen	jamen
2nd person	singular		imo	ka	nimo	mo	dimo
2nd person	plural		imiyo	kamo	nimiyo	miyo	dimiyo
3rd person	singular		–	–	niya/ña	na	dira
3rd person	plural		sira	sira	nira	da	dira
