= Bicol Region =

Administrative region of the Philippines

Bicol Region Kabikulan
- Region
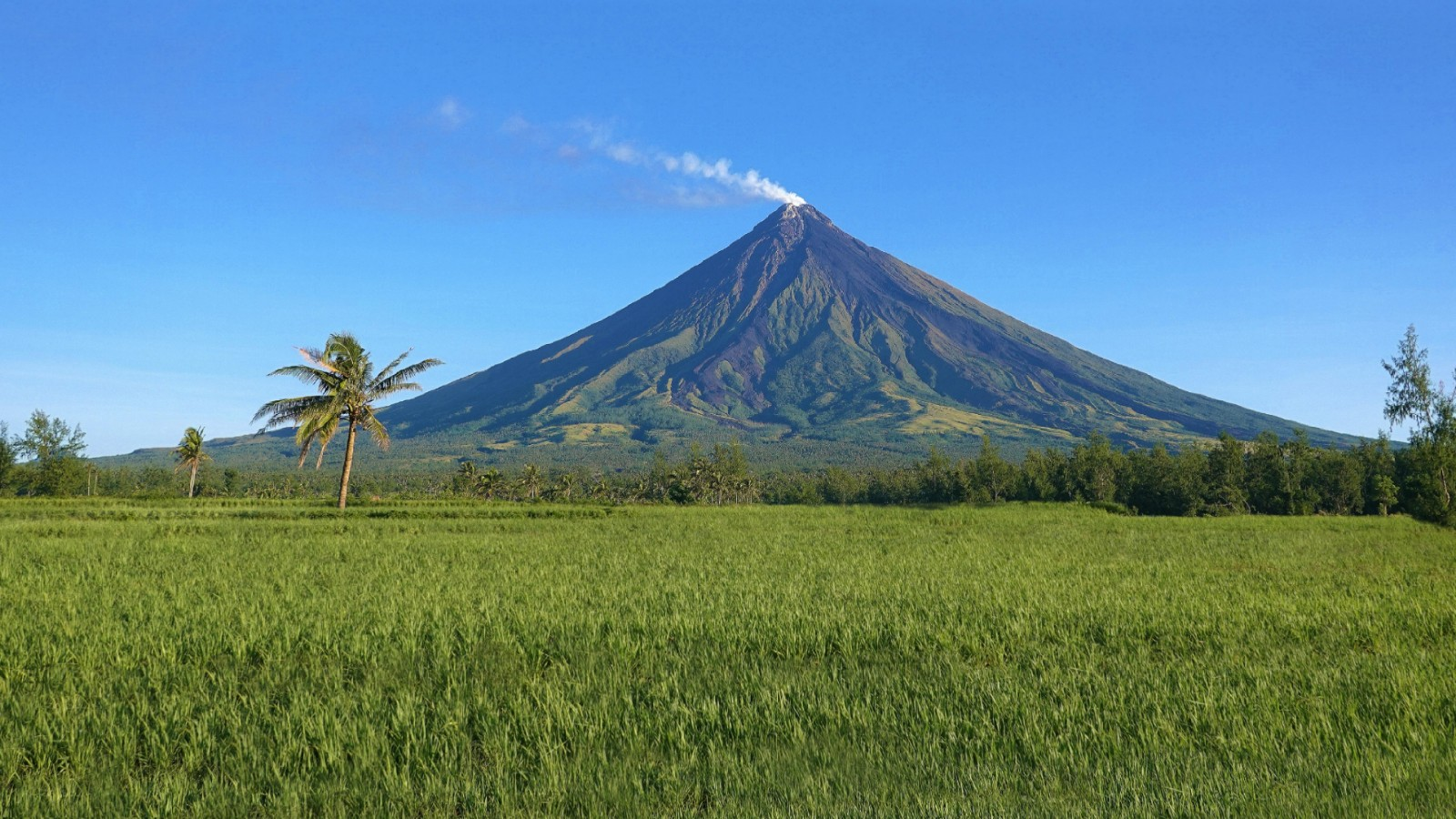
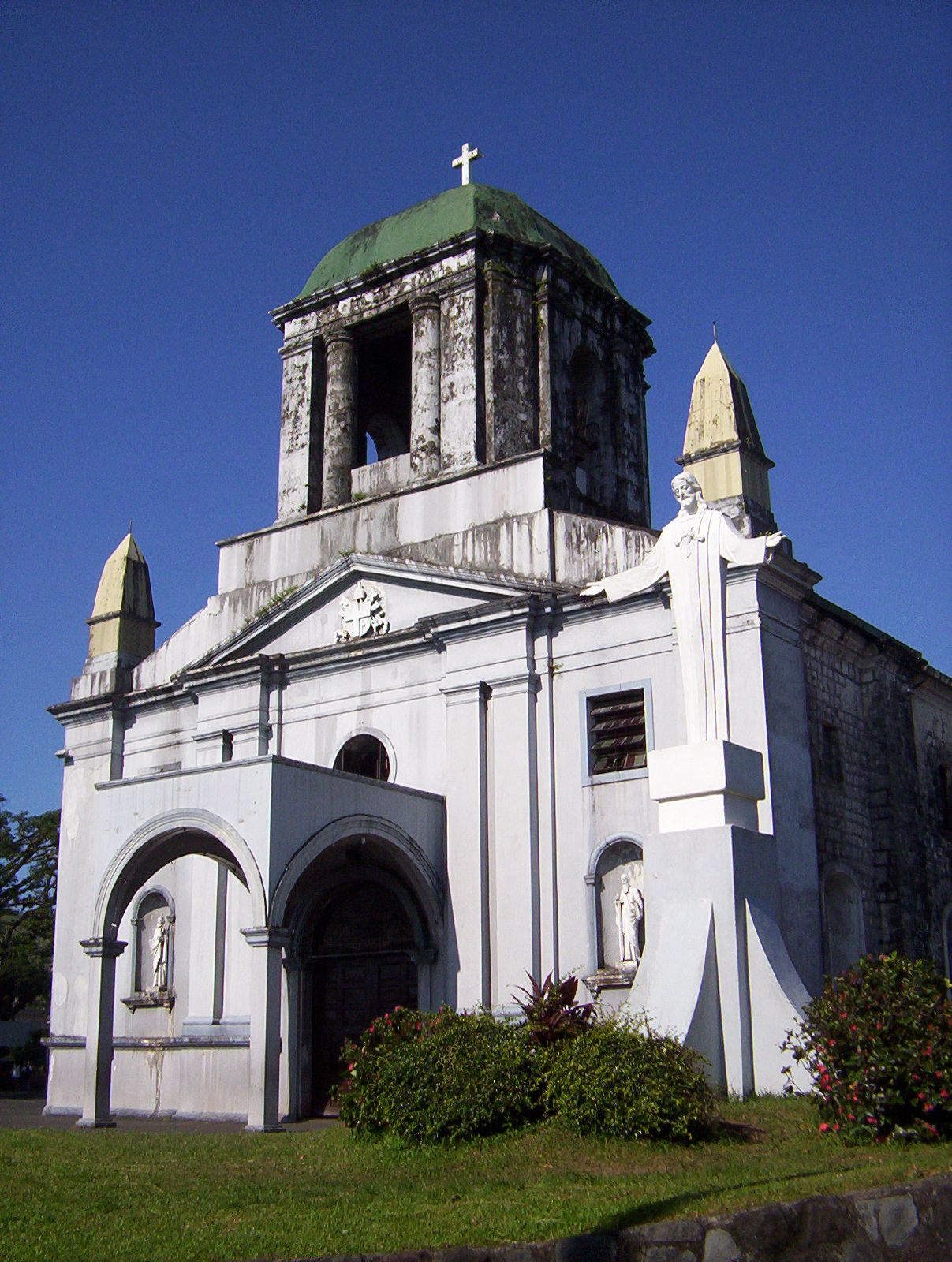
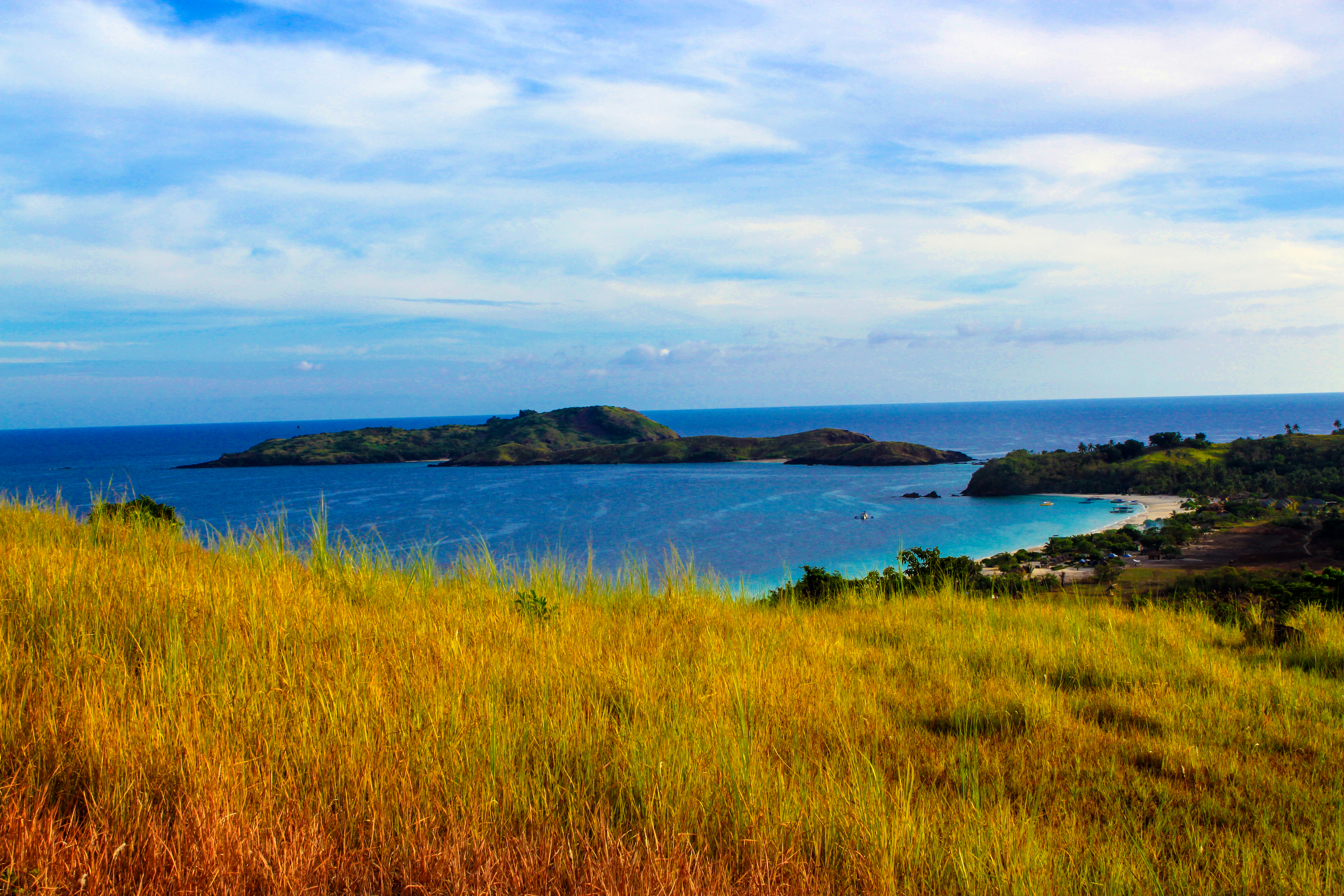
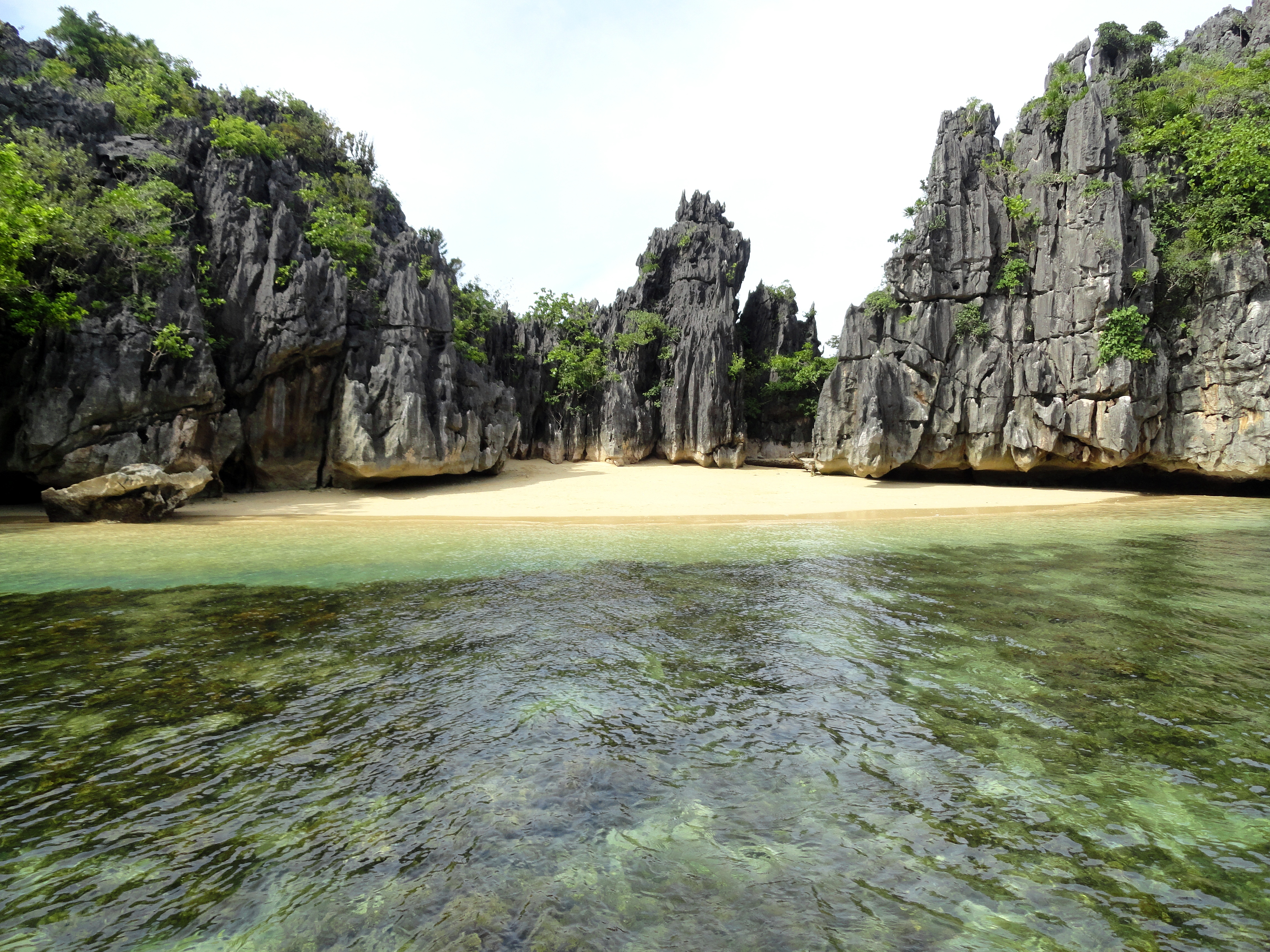
- Clockwise from the top: Mayon Volcano, Calaguas Islands, Ateneo de Naga University Church, Caramoan National Park, Legazpi Cathedral
- Nickname: Home of the Uragons
- Anthem: Bicol Regional March
- Location in the Philippines
- Interactive map of Bicol Region
- Coordinates: 13°30′N 123°20′E
- Country: Philippines
- Island group: Luzon
- Regional center and largest city: Legazpi

Area
  - Total: 18,155.82 km^{2} (7,010.00 sq mi)
- Highest elevation (Mayon Volcano): 2,463 m (8,081 ft)

Population (2024 census)
  - Total: 6,064,426
  - Density: 334.0210/km^{2} (865.1105/sq mi)
  - Households: 1,365,044
- Demonym: Bicolano

Divisions
  - Provinces: 6: Albay; Camarines Norte; Camarines Sur; Catanduanes; Masbate; Sorsogon
  - Independent cities: 1: Naga (as being a Highly urbanized city)
  - Component cities: 6: Iriga; Legazpi; Ligao; Masbate City; Sorsogon City; Tabaco
  - Municipalities: 107
  - Barangays: 3,471
  - Districts: 16

Economy
  - Poverty incidence: 16.8% (2025)
  - GDP total: US$13.5 billion
  - GDP per capita: US$2,146
  - HDI (2023): 0.689 medium · 15th of 17
- Time zone: UTC+8 (PST)
- PSGC: 0500000000
- ISO 3166 code: PH-05
- Electorate: 4,053,977 voters (2025)
- Languages: Bikol languages; (Central Bikol; Albayanon; Rinconada; Northern Catanduanes; Southern Catanduanes); Visayan languages; (Masbateño; Northern Sorsogon; Waray Sorsogon); Tagalog; English
- Website: dilgbicol.org

The Bicol Region, (Note: Central Bikol: Rehiyon kan Bikol; Rinconada Bikol: Rehiyon ka Bikol; Waray Sorsogon, Masbateño: Rehiyon san Bikol; Tagalog: Rehiyon ng Bikol) designated as Region V, is an administrative region of the Philippines. It comprises six provinces, four on the Bicol Peninsula (the southeastern end of Luzon): Albay, Camarines Norte, Camarines Sur, and Sorsogon, and two off the shore: Catanduanes and Masbate, and one highly urbanized city of Naga.

The regional administrative center and the most populous city is Legazpi, while the region's commercial and educational center is the highly urbanized city of Naga. The region is bounded by Lamon Bay to the north, the Philippine Sea to the east, and the Sibuyan Sea and Ragay Gulf to the west. The northernmost provinces, Camarines Norte and Camarines Sur, are bordered to the west by the province of Quezon in the Calabarzon region.

== Geography ==
The Bicol Region comprises the Bicol Peninsula, the southernmost and easternmost part of Luzon, the largest island in the Philippine archipelago as well as two adjacent islands and their satellite islands. The total land area is 5.9% of the total land area of the country. Around 69.3% of the total land area is alienable and disposable while the remaining 30.7% is public forest areas.

== History ==
Map of the Bicol Region with its settlements (banwa) in 1567 before Spanish colonization.

The Bicol region was known as Ibalong, variously interpreted to derive from ibalio, "to bring to the other side"; ibalon, "people from the other side" or "people who are hospitable and give visitors gifts to bring home"; or a corruption of Gibal-ong, a sitio of Magallanes, Sorsogon where the Spaniards first landed in 1567. The Bicol River was first mentioned in Spanish documents in 1572. The region was also called Los Camarines after the huts found by the Spaniards in Camalig, Albay. No prehistoric animal fossils have been discovered in Bicol and the peopling of the region remains obscure. The Aeta from Camarines Sur to Sorsogon strongly suggest that aborigines lived there long ago, but earliest evidence is of middle to late Neolithic life.

A barangay (village) system was in existence by 1569. Records show no sign of Islamic rule nor any authority surpassing the datu (chieftain). Precolonial leadership was based on strength, courage, and intelligence. The native seemed apolitical. Thus, the datu's influence mattered most during crises like wars. Otherwise, early Bicol society remained family centered, and the leader was the head of the family.

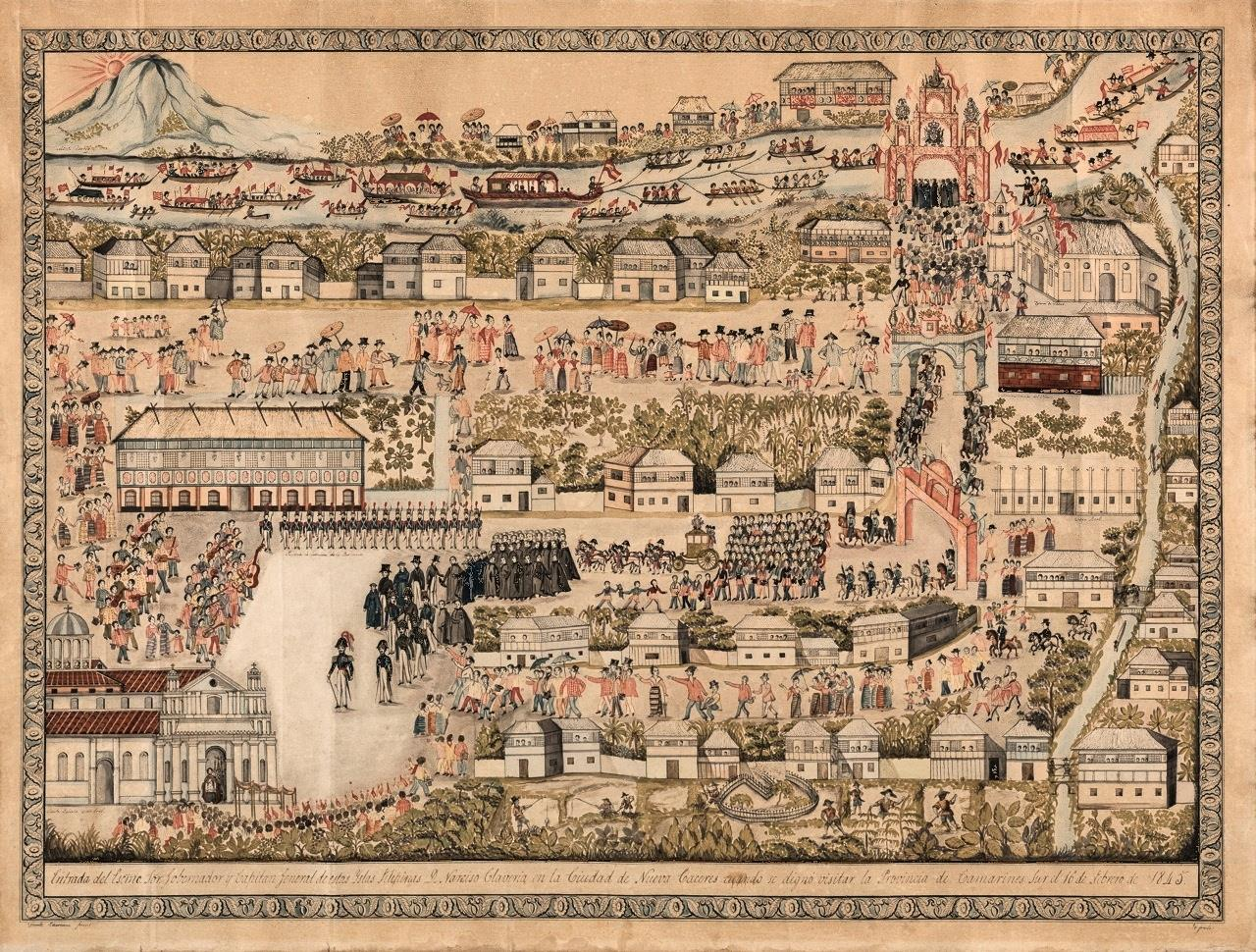
Nueva Cáceres 1854 modern day Naga, Camarines Sur

The Spanish influence in Bicol resulted mainly from the efforts of Augustinian and Franciscan Spanish missionaries. The first churches in Bicol, the San Francisco Church, and the Naga Cathedral, both in Naga City, along with the Holy Cross Parish in Nabua, Camarines Sur, are instituted by the Holy Order of the Franciscans. One of the oldest dioceses in the Philippines, the Archdiocese of Caceres, was also instituted in the Bicol Region. During this time, Bicol was dotted by many astilleros (shipyards) which were focused on constructing Manila Galleons, the heaviest ships in their time, from the local hardwood forests and these Manila Galleons were responsible for trade between Asia and the Americas. Bicol also has Latin-American settlements and cultural influence mostly from Mexico due to the abundance of chili pepper plantations in the area, as it is Mexican in origin. Bicolano cuisine is noted for the propensity of being spicy. However regardless, the region throughout its history has been among the hardest to control by Spanish, American, and Japanese occupants due to heavy resistance among the populace.

The 1818 Spanish census however showed that among the provinces of Bicol, Albay had 1,311 Spanish-Filipino families, Camarines Norte had 1,810 Spanish-Filipino families, Camarines Sur had 964 Spanish-Filipino families, Sorsogon had 149 Spanish-Filipino families, Masbate had 1 Spanish-Filipino clan, and Catanduanes had 150 Spanish-Filipino families, some of these Spanish families were from the Spanish Americas while some were from Spanish Europe.

== Administrative divisions ==
=== Provinces ===
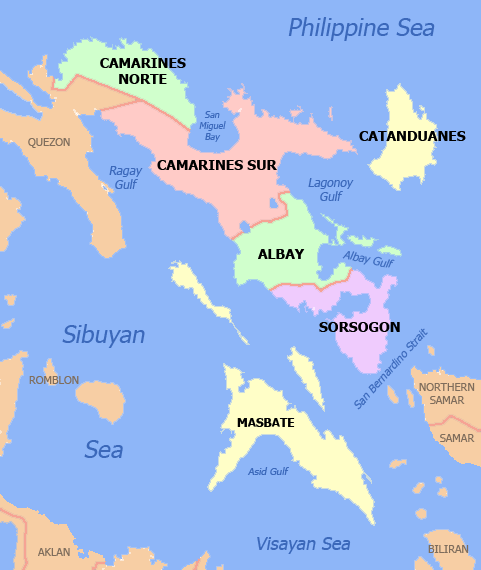
Provinces of Bicol

The region comprises six provinces: Albay, Camarines Norte, Camarines Sur, Sorsogon and the island-provinces of Catanduanes and Masbate, 107 Municipalities and 3,471 Barangays

As of 2020, Camarines Sur is the region's largest province in area and population, occupying 5,481.6 km^{2} (2,116.5 sq mi) or around 30.4% of the total land area with a population of 2,068,244. Catanduanes is the smallest in area as well as population with only 1,511.5 km^{2} (583.6 sq mi) or 8.4% of the total regional area and a population of 271,879.

Province or HUC	Capital	Population (2020)		Area		Density		Cities	Muni.	Barangay	
				km^{2}	sq mi	/km^{2}	/sq mi				
Albay	Legazpi City	22.6%	1,374,768	2,574.91	994.18	530	1,400	3	15	720	
Camarines Norte	Daet	10.4%	629,699	2,277.93	879.51	280	730	0	12	282	
Camarines Sur	Pili	34.0%	2,068,244	5,511.90	2,128.16	380	980	2	35	1,063	
Catanduanes	Virac	4.5%	271,879	1,492.16	576.13	180	470	0	11	315	
Masbate	Masbate City	14.9%	908,920	4,138.56	1,597.91	220	570	1	21	550	
Sorsogon	Sorsogon City	13.6%	828,655	2,119.01	818.15	390	1,000	1	14	541	
Total			6,082,165	18,114.47	6,994.04	340	880	7	107	3,471	
Naga	†	—	1.2%	210,545	84.48	32.62	2,500	6,500	1	—	27
Total				16,195,042	16,576.26	6,400.13	980	2,500			
• Figures for Camarines Sur included the former Independent component city of Naga. And the figures for Naga will be excluded on the following census as for becoming a highly urbanized city .

==== Governors and vice governors ====
Province	Image	Governor	Political Party	Vice Governor
Albay		Noel E. Rosal	NUP	Farida S. Co
Camarines Norte		Ricarte R. Padilla	PFP	Joseph Ascutia
Camarines Sur		Luis Raymund F. Villafuerte Jr.	NUP	Salvio Patrick Edmund F. Fortuno Jr.
Catanduanes		Patrick T. Azanza	Independent	Robert A. Fernandez
Masbate		Richard T. Kho	Lakas	Fernando P. Talisic
Sorsogon		Jose Edwin B. Hamor	NPC	Krunimar Antonio D. Escudero II

=== Cities ===
The region has one highly urbanized city, Naga, and six component cities – Iriga, Legazpi, Ligao, Masbate City, Sorsogon City, and Tabaco. Masbate and Sorsogon are cities in their eponymous provinces.

- † Regional center

City	Population (2020)	Area		Density		City class	Income class	Province
		km^{2}	sq mi	/km^{2}	/sq mi			
Iriga	114,457	137.35	53.03	830	2,100	Component	4th	Camarines Sur
† Legazpi	209,533	153.70	59.34	1,400	3,600	Component	1st	Albay
Ligao	118,096	246.75	95.27	480	1,200	Component	4th	Albay
Masbate City	104,522	188.00	72.59	560	1,500	Component	4th	Masbate
Naga	209,170	84.48	32.62	2,500	6,500	Highly urbanized	1st	Camarines Sur
Sorsogon City	182,237	276.11	106.61	660	1,700	Component	2nd	Sorsogon
Tabaco	140,961	117.14	45.23	1,200	3,100	Component	4th	Albay

== Demographics ==
Population census of Bicol Region
Year	Pop.	±% p.a.
1903	643,901	—
1918	840,004	+1.79%
1939	1,346,620	+2.27%
1948	1,666,459	+2.40%
1960	2,362,707	+2.95%
1970	2,966,881	+2.30%
1975	3,193,721	+1.49%
1980	3,476,982	+1.71%
1990	3,910,001	+1.18%
1995	4,325,307	+1.91%
2000	4,686,669	+1.73%
2007	5,106,160	+1.19%
2010	5,420,411	+2.20%
2015	5,796,989	+1.29%
2020	6,082,165	+1.02%
2024	6,064,426	−0.07%
Source: Philippine Statistics Authority

The Bicol Region has a population of 6,064,426 as of 2024 census, decreasing at an average annual rate of −0.07% percent between 2020 and 2024. The region's population density increased to 320 persons per square kilometer in 2015.

In 1970, Camarines Sur was the only province with close to a million population. Albay, which was next in rank, reached the 1970 population level of Camarines Sur only 20 years later. Masbate and Sorsogon were in the same level every census year from 1970 to 1980. It is noteworthy that distribution and growth of the 1970 population were towards areas that were sparsely populated but agriculturally rich and/or endowed with fishery resources. The island province of Catanduanes and its municipalities have exhibited very low population growth from 1970 to 1980.

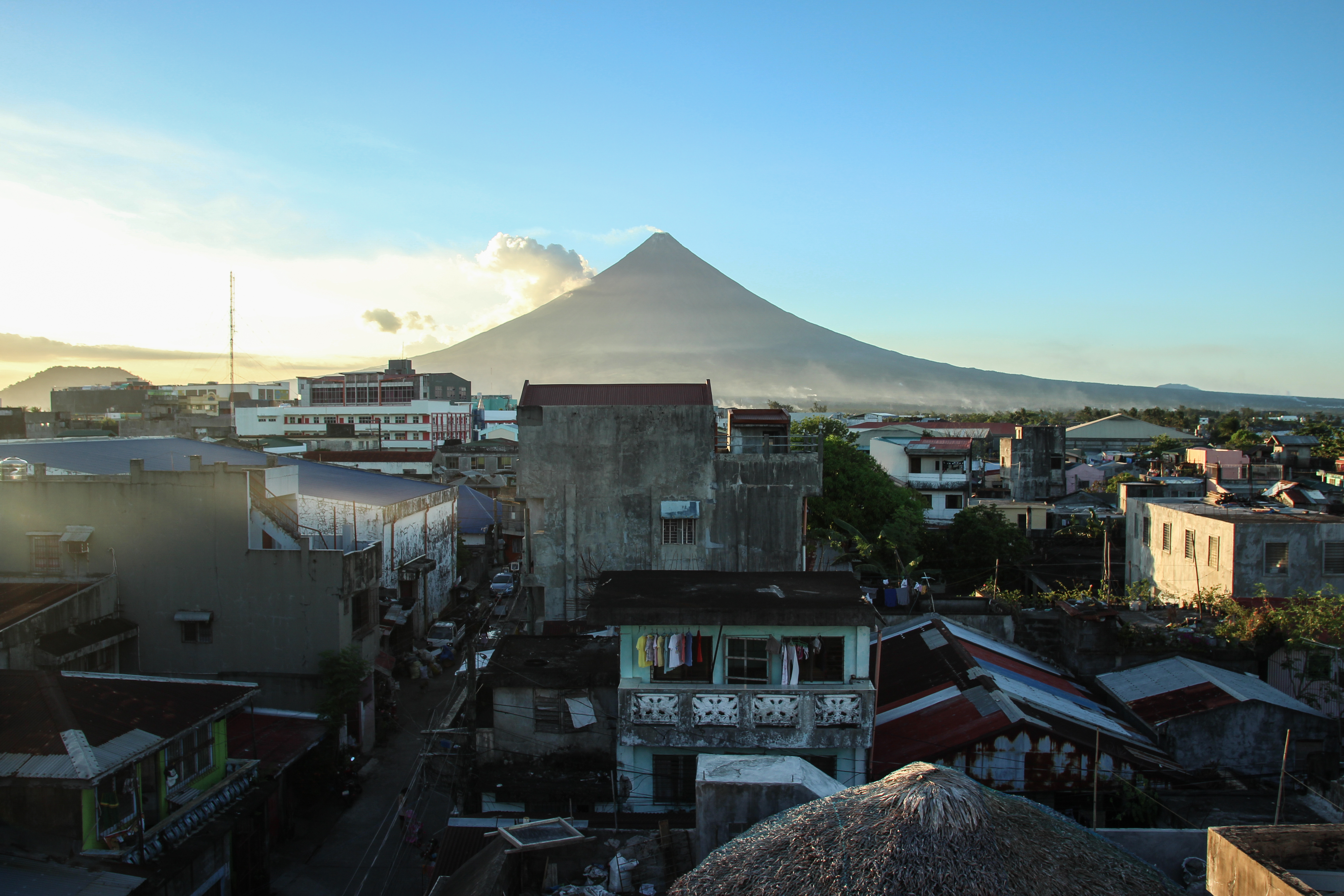
A view of Legazpi City among Mt. Mayon

In 1980, the pattern was towards urbanization. This was due to the pull of newly installed infrastructures, particularly roads, and the sporadic growth of trade in strategically situated municipalities that have better economic opportunities. The 1990 growth originated from the strong attraction of employment opportunities in established urban centers, which have become a source of growth of adjacent municipalities. This situation was highly evident in Naga and Legazpi areas, whose surrounding municipalities exhibited high growth rates. Unmistakably, the spill-over effects of development permeated those initial high growth areas.

Population spill-over happened in the Legazpi, Naga and Daet areas. Due to more population and more opportunities, Naga, Daet and Legazpi spilled their population to their neighboring and adjacent towns.

The Bicolanos are descended from the Austronesian-speaking people who came during the Iron Age. Many of Bicolanos also have Chinese, Arab, and Spanish admixtures. Most of the townsfolk have Spanish mixtures and their language is referred to as Bikol or Bikolano. Bicolanos have a high percentage of Spanish introgression with a government sponsored study showing 2 out of 10 Bicolanos or 2/10ths of the population being of Spanish descent. Only the Chavacanos among the Philippine ethnic groups, have a higher Spanish percentage at 4/10ths of the population, compared to Bicolano's 2/10ths, while the average percentage of Spanish descent among other Filipino Lowland Christian Ethnic groups are 6% out of 100%. The Bicolano language is very fragmented, and its dialects are mutually incomprehensible to speakers of other Bicolano dialects. The majority of the Bicolano people are devout Roman Catholics due to the Spanish conquering the country and converting them to their religion. Catholic Mass is celebrated daily in many churches in the Bicol Region.

=== Language ===
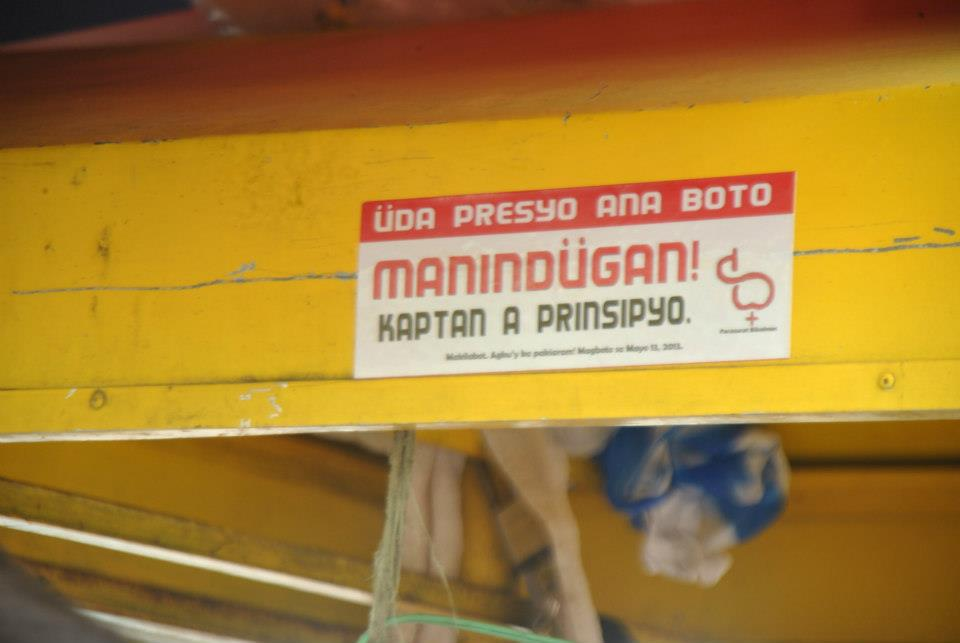
An election campaign sticker written in Rinconada Bikol.

The people of the Bicol Region, called Bicolanos, speak any of the several languages of the Bikol language subgroup, called Bikol macrolanguages, Austronesian languages closely grouped under the Central Philippine languages family such as the Visayan languages and Tagalog. The four major groups of language in Bikol are Coastal Bikol (with four sub-languages), Inland Bikol (with six sub-languages), Pandan Bikol (lone language) and Bisakol (with three sub-languages). The majority of Bicolanos understand and speak Central Bikol language (a member of Coastal Bikol group of languages), since it is the language used in literature and mass media, but with varying degrees. A known misconception of many Bicolanos is that Central Bikol, used in the cities of Legazpi and Naga, is the standard Bikol. Central Bikol, though spoken by the majority and with speakers represented in all provinces in the region, is not a standard Bikol, since other forms of Bikol used in the region are separate languages and usually unintelligible. However, the standard form of Central Bikol language is the Canaman dialect.

Other Bikol languages are Rinconada Bikol, spoken in southern part of Camarines Sur province, Pandan Bikol spoken in northern part of Catanduanes island and the Albay Bikol group of languages that include Buhinon, Libon, West Miraya and East Miraya. Albay Bikol speakers can be found in Buhi, Camarines Sur, central and eastern parts of Albay and in Donsol, Sorsogon. The standard form of Rinconada Bikol both in pronunciation and writing is the Sinabukid (Highland) dialect of Iriga variant. On the other hand, Buhinon of Buhi, Camarines Sur and Libon of Libon, Albay are the languages that are only used in their respective municipalities. Rinconada Bikol and Albay Bikol group of languages are members of Inland Bikol, while Pandan Bikol is the only language with no sub-languages or division.

The majority of the population in Masbate and Sorsogon speaks Masbateño, Waray Sorsoganon and Northern Sorsoganon. The three are Visayan languages but influenced by Bikol languages (especially the latter), thus tagged and collectively referred to as Bisakol (Being Visayan languages spoken in Bicol), a portmanteau of Bisaya (Visayan) and Bikol (Bicolano).

Aside from Masbateño, three more Visayan languages are spoken in Masbate, including Hiligaynon/Ilonggo are spoken in the southwestern tip, while Cebuano and Waray-Waray are spoken in the southern part of the island province respectively. Tagalog is the dominant and native language of Bicolanos living in the municipalities in the northern half of Camarines Norte and the town of Del Gallego in Camarines Sur.

Bicolanos also speak and understand Filipino, the national language of the Philippines, aside from native Tagalog-speaking Bicolanos in northern half of Camarines Norte and Del Gallego. The Bicolano languages are unique in the world for being the only ones with an angry register or a coded slang for forceful informal use.

=== Religion ===
The region retains Roman Catholicism as the overwhelming religion of the great majority. The Catholic religion has the highest number of followers than any other area in the Philippines. The Catholic church grew in the Bicol Region through the efforts of the bishops from Nueva Caceres (Naga City) from the 17th century until the Philippine Revolution in 1898. Naga City is the religious center of the Bicol Region and is the seat of one of the oldest dioceses in the Philippines, the ecclesiastical Archdiocese of Caceres. Other dioceses include are the Dioceses of Legazpi, Sorsogon, Daet, Masbate, Libmanan and Virac. Fiestas (Feast day of saints) are annual celebrations of parishes, from a simple barrio fiesta honoring a patron associated for good harvest, to a town fiesta honoring a miraculous saint, a diocesan fiesta like the feast of Our Lady of Salvation, or a regional one such as the Our Lady of Peñafrancia Fiesta, the largest Marian devotion in Asia, a week-long celebration to honor the Virgin Mary, dubbed as the "Patroness of Bicolandia". In Luzon, the Bicol Region holds the most men entering the seminary for Catholic priesthood, or women entering the religious life to become Catholic nuns. This can be accredited to the Holy Rosary Minor Seminary, Daughters of Mary, and Daughters of Charity Convents in Naga City.

The largest minority religion in the region is Iglesia ni Cristo (INC) known for its magnificent worship buildings, commonly called chapels or kapilya, with towering spires that dot the Bicol landscape. Each province represents one ecclesiastical district (E.D.) with the exception of Camarines Sur which is divided into two – Camarines Southwest E.D. in Naga, and Camarines Southeast E.D. in Iriga City. In total, INC has seven ecclesiastical districts in the Bicol region. The chapel of local congregation of Legazpi, Albay is the biggest.

Other religions are also well represented in Bicol such as Jehovah's Witnesses, Protestants denominations of Seventh-Day Adventist church, Baptist Church, Pentecostal, Islam, and indigenous religions.

Prior to colonization, the region had a complex religious system which involved various deities. Among these deities include: Gugurang, the supreme god who dwells inside of Mount Mayon where he guards and protects the sacred fire in which Aswang, his brother was trying to steal. Whenever people disobey his orders, wishes and commit numerous sins, he would cause Mount Mayon to burst lava as a sign of warning for people to mend their crooked ways. Ancient Bikolanos had a rite performed for him called Atang; Asuang, the evil god who always try to steal the sacred fire of Mount Mayon from his brother, Gugurang. Addressed sometimes as Aswang, he dwells mainly inside Mount Malinao. As an evil god, he would cause the people to suffer misfortunes and commit sins. Enemy of Gugurang and a friend of Bulan the god of the Moon; Haliya, the masked goddess of the moonlight and the archenemy of Bakunawa and protector of Bulan. Her cult is composed primarily of women. There is also a ritual dance named after her as it is performed to be a countermeasure against Bakunawa.; Bulan, the god of the pale moon, he is depicted as a pubescent boy with uncommon comeliness that made savage beast and the vicious mermaids (Magindara) tame. He has deep affection towards Magindang, but plays with him by running away so that Magindang would never catch him. The reason for this is because he is shy to the man that he loves. If Magindang manages to catch Bulan, Haliya always comes to free him from Magindang's grip; Magindang, the god of the sea and all its creatures. He has deep affection to the lunar god Bulan and pursues him despite never catching him. Due to this, the Bicolanos reasoned that it is to why the waves rise to reach the Moon when seen from the distant horizon. Whenever he does catch up to Bulan, Haliya comes to rescue Bulan and free him immediately; Okot, god of forest and hunting; and Bakunawa, a gigantic sea serpent deity who is often considered as the cause of eclipses, the devourer of the sun and the moon, and an adversary of Haliya as Bakunawa's main aim is to swallow Bulan, who Haliya swore to protect for all of eternity.

=== Culture and traits ===
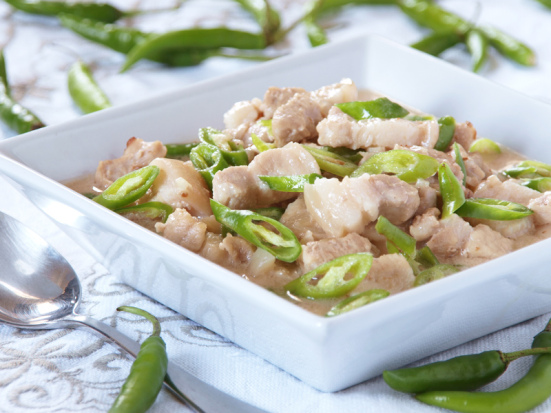
Bicol express

The Bicolano cuisine is primarily noted for the prominent use of chili peppers and gata (coconut milk) in its food. A classic example is the gulay na lada, known outside the region as Bicol express, a well-loved dish using siling labuyo (native small chillies) and the aforementioned gata.

Like their other neighboring regions, Bicolanas are also expected to lend a hand in household work. They are even anticipated to offer assistance after being married. On the other hand, Bicolano men are expected to assume the role of becoming the primary source of income and financial support of his family.

Bicolanos are also known for being very religious, the place is known for Señora De Peñafrancia. Bicolanos are often sweet, regionalistic, friendly, adventurous, puts high importance on education and social status. Contrary to what is believed, not all Bicolanos are fond of chili. Men often know how to cook.

== Infrastructure ==
=== Roads and Bridges ===
- Matnog – Santa Magdalena – Bulusan Road – This project was a road improvement of Matnog – Santa Magdalena – Bulusan Road, linking the coastal barangays of Santa Magdalena – Bulusan – Matnog in the province of Sorsogon. This road also serves as an alternate route due to the traffic impairment along Daang Maharlika and also an access road leading to different tourist destination. The project was started on August 6, 2015, and was completed on July 20, 2018.

== Economy ==
Poverty incidence of Bicol Region (%)

Source: Philippine Statistics Authority

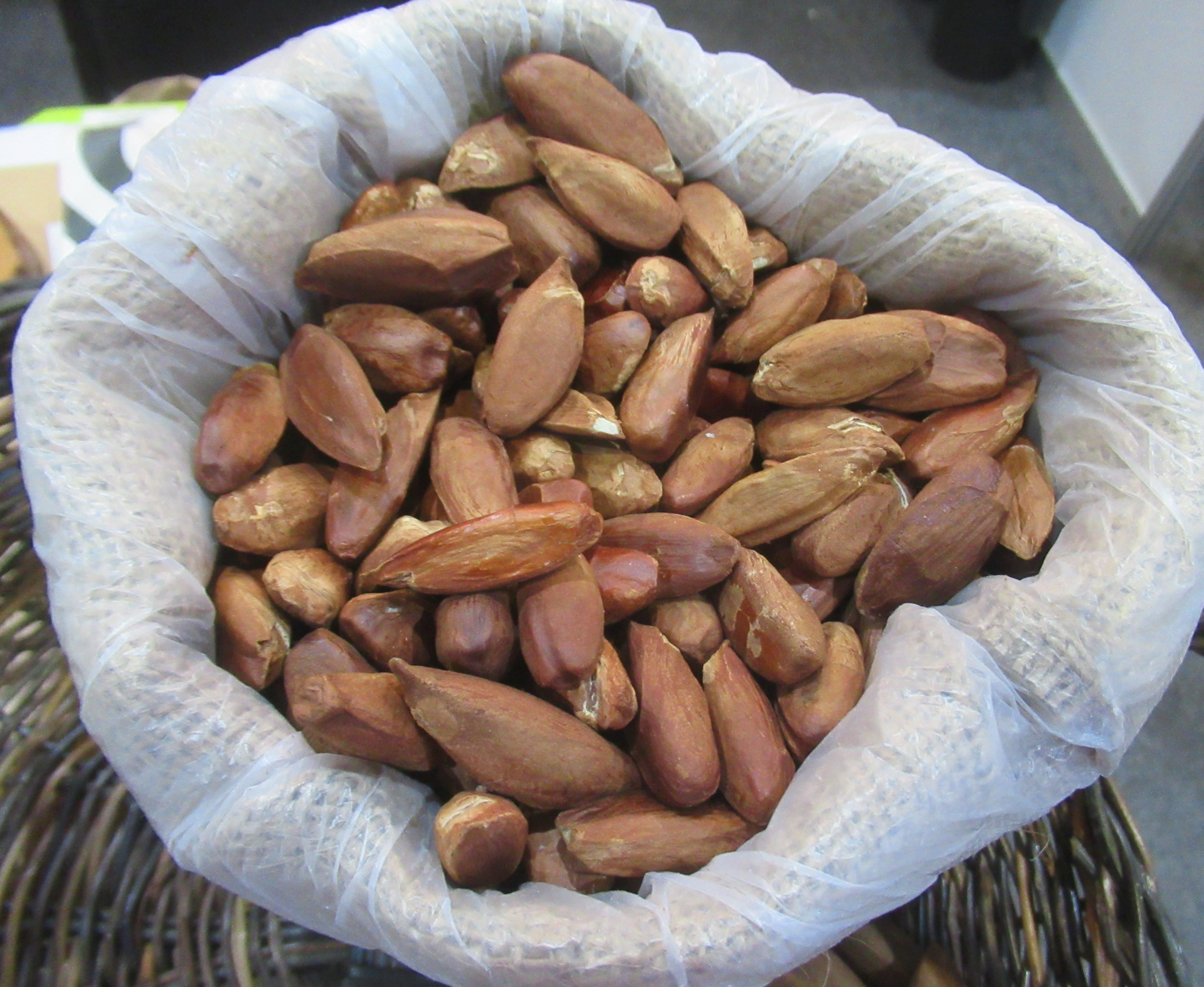
Pili nuts (shelled and roasted)

Bicol Region has a large amount of rich flatland, and agriculture is the largest component of the economy, followed by commercial fishing. Coconuts, abaca, banana, coffee and jackfruit are the top five permanent crops in the region. Rice and corn are among the chief seasonal crops. Coal mining is also one of the contributors to the region's economy. Commercial fishing is also important with thirteen major fishing grounds supplying fish markets in places as far as Metro Manila.

Currently, Bicol Region has 13,435 farmers that cultivate 142,405 hectares of pili plantation according the Department of Agriculture-Bicol's data. The DA further said that 90% of Philippines' pili production is from the Bicol Region and it began asexual reproduction for the product's export. The resilient tree's fruit is 7% kernel, 25% shell and 68% pulp. The Sorsogon Provincial Pili Development Board will petition for the Region's declaration as the "Pili Capital of the Philippines".

In October 2023, the Department of Trade and Industry launched "Orgullo kan Bikol" Trade and Travel Fair at Shangri-La Plaza. The 103 exhibitors are MSMEs which displayed 253 new products from Bicol's 6 provinces.

== Tourism ==
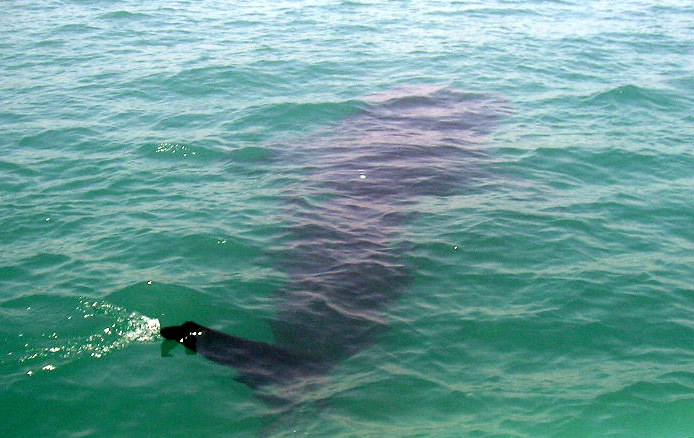
Whale shark spotting in Donsol, Sorsogon

The region's tourism industry has been revived by the popularity of Mayon Volcano, Caramoan islands, CamSur Water Sports Complex, Mt. Isarog National Park, whale shark spotting, among others, which consequently increased the number of upscale resorts. Naga City has shopping, dining, and lifestyle districts, colonial churches, and pilgrimages to Our Lady of Peñafrancia.

The municipality of Daet and Catanduanes province have long been destinations for surfers. The opening of the Bicol International Airport in Daraga, Albay was hoped to further boost tourism in the region.

== Geology ==
Bicol region is highly volcanic in origin and part of the Pacific Ring of Fire. Known as the Bicol Volcanic Arc or Chain, the volcanoes are the results of the Philippine Sea Plate subducting under the Philippine Mobile Belt, along the Philippine Trench. Volcanism is evident by the number of hot springs, crater lakes, and volcanoes that dot the region starting from Mount Labo in Camarines Norte to the Gate Mountains in Matnog, Sorsogon.

Mayon Volcano is the most prominent of the volcanoes in the region, famous for its perfect conical shape and for being the most active in the Philippines. Its eruptions have repeatedly inflicted disasters on the region, but during lulls in activity, it is a particularly magnificent peak. The southernmost tip of the peninsula is dominated by Bulusan Volcano, the other active volcano in the region. Tiwi in Albay and the Bacon-Manito area between Sorsogon and Albay are the sites of two major geothermal fields that contribute substantially to the Bicol Power Grid, which is the only independent power grid in the Philippines.

=== Volcanoes ===
From North to South

Picture	Name
	Mount Isarog is a 1,966-metre (6,450 ft) fumarolic volcano with a 2.5-kilometre (1.6 mi) wide crater breached to the east. The mountain and vicinity covering 10,112 hectares (24,990 acres) is a protected area in the Bicol Region under the name Mount Isarog Natural Park.
	Mount Iriga is a 1,196-metre (3,924 ft) volcano with a large horseshoe-shaped collapsed crater located adjacent to Lake Buhi (foreground).
	Mount Malinao is a 1,548-metre (5,079 ft) volcano with a large crater about 3 kilometres (1.9 mi) at its widest, which is breached to the east, The geothermal fields of Tiwi are located on its lower eastern slope.
	Mount Masaraga is a sharp-topped 1,328-metre (4,357 ft) Holocene volcano NW of Mayon.
	Mayon Volcano, the highest point of the region at 2,463 metres (8,081 ft), is also the most popular in the region for its beautifully symmetrical cone. It is also the most active in the country. The volcano is one of the protected areas of Region V under the name Mayon Volcano Natural Park encompassing 5,776 hectares (14,270 acres).
	Pocdol Mountains with its highest elevation at 1,102 metres (3,615 ft), is a fumarolic group of volcanoes situated between Albay and Sorsogon provinces. It is the location of the Bac-Man Geothermal Power Plant and the PNOC Eco-Park, a 25,100-hectare (62,000-acre) ecotourism park maintained and protected by the Philippine National Oil Company (PNOC).
	Bulusan Volcano, the other active volcano of the region, has an altitude of 1,565 metres (5,135 ft). It is located on the remains of the 11-kilometre (6.8 mi) Irosin Caldera. The volcano is a protected area and the centerpiece of the 3,672-hectare (9,070-acre) Bulusan Volcano Natural Park.

== Education ==
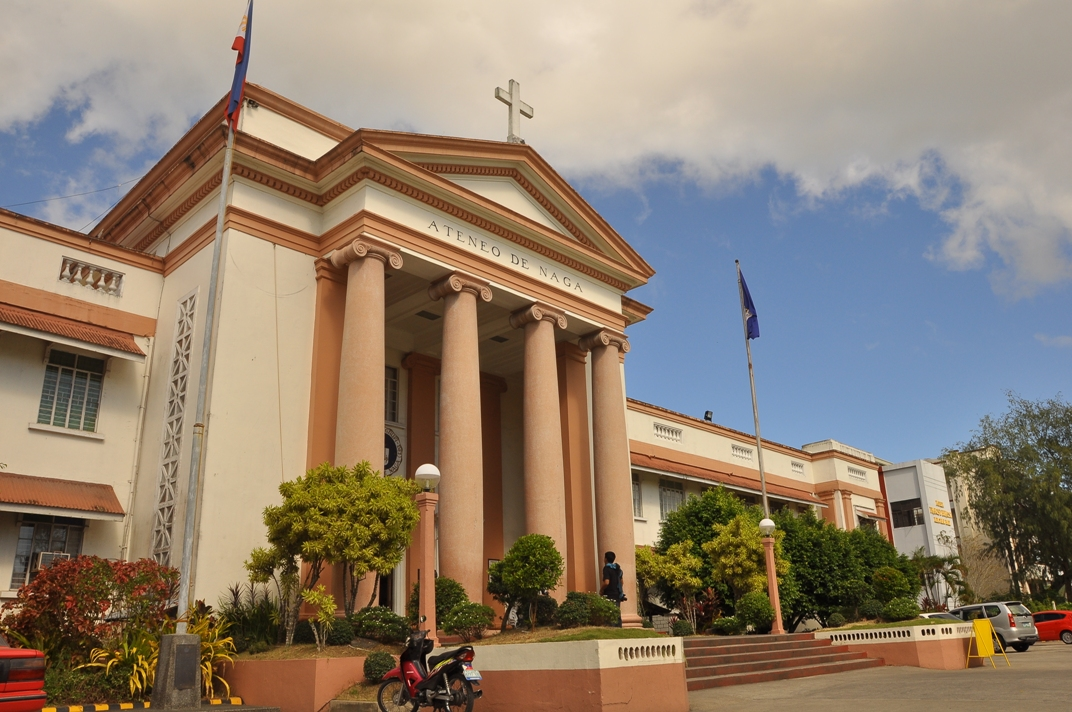
Ateneo de Naga University

From 1945 until 2011, the basic education system was composed of six years of elementary education starting at the age of 6, and four years of high school education starting at the age of 12. Further education was provided by technical or vocational schools, or in higher education institutions such as universities. Although the 1987 Constitution stated that elementary education was compulsory, this was never enforced.

In 2011, the country started to transition from its old 10-year basic educational system to a K–12 educational system, as mandated by the Department of Education. The new 12-year system is now compulsory, along with the adoption of new curriculum for all schools (see 2010s and the K–12 program). The transition period will end with the 2017–2018 school year, which is the graduation date for the first group of students who entered the new educational system.

All public schools in the Philippines must start classes on the date mandated by the Department of Education (usually the first Monday for public, second Monday for private and third Monday for some colleges for the month of June) since the presidency of Joseph Estrada in 1999, and must end after each school completes the mandated 200-day school calendar organized by the Department of Education (usually around the third week of March to the second week of April). Private schools are not obliged to abide by a specific date but must open classes no later than the last week of August.

Name	Acronym	Province (Main campus)	City/Municipality	Established
Ateneo de Naga University	AdNU	Camarines Sur	Naga City	1940
Southeast Asian University of Technology	SEAUTech	Camarines Sur	Naga City	1911
Bicol University	BU	Albay	Legazpi City	1969
Catanduanes State University	CatSU	Catanduanes	Virac	1961
Central Bicol State University of Agriculture	CBSUA	Camarines Sur	Pili	1918
Divine Word College of Legazpi	DWCL	Albay	Legazpi City	1947
Dr. Emilio B. Espinosa Sr. Memorial State College of Agriculture and Technology	DEBESMSCAT	Masbate	Mandaon	1952
Naga College Foundation, Inc.	NCF	Camarines Sur	Naga City	1947
Mariners' Polytechnic Colleges, Inc.	MPC	Camarines Sur	Naga City	1974
Partido State University	PSU	Camarines Sur	Goa	2001
Polytechnic State University of Bicol	PSUB	Camarines Sur	Nabua	1983
Sorsogon State University	SorSU	Sorsogon	Sorsogon City	1907
Universidad de Santa Isabel	USI	Camarines Sur	Naga City	1868
University of Camarines Norte	UCN	Camarines Norte	Daet	1992
University of Nueva Caceres	UNC	Camarines Sur	Naga City	1948
University of Santo Tomas–Legazpi	UST–Legazpi	Albay	Legazpi City	1948
Bicol University Gubat Campus	BUGC	Sorsogon	Gubat	2000

== Notable people ==
Public service and governance
Name	Information
Leni Robredo	Vice President of the Republic of the Philippines (2016–2022), politician and lawyer. Served during the 16th Congress as Member of the Philippine House of Representatives from Camarines Sur's Third District. The widow of then Interior Secretary Jesse Robredo. Born in Naga City.
Tecla San Andres Ziga	Former senator, first female bar top-notcher. Born in Nueva Caceres, Ambos Camarines.
Raul Roco	Born in Naga City, a Filipino statesman, prominent lawyer, congressman, senator, secretary of education) during the presidency of Gloria Macapagal Arroyo.
Francis "Chiz" Escudero	Incumbent senator, 2016 vice-presidential aspirant, former Sorsogon representative, and former Sorsogon governor.
Antonio Trillanes IV	Former senator, vice-presidential aspirant (2016), and former military officer. Leader of the Magdalo group.
Gregorio Honasan	Former senator, vice-presidential aspirant (2016), and former military officer.
Leila de Lima	Former senator, lawyer, human rights activist and politician. She was appointed by President Gloria Macapagal Arroyo as chairperson of the Philippine Commission on Human Rights in May 2008 and she served in the commission until June 30, 2010, when she was appointed by President Benigno S. Aquino III as the Philippines' secretary of the Department of Justice.
Ceferino "Joker" Arroyo Jr.	Former senator turned congressman, statesman and key figure in the 1986 EDSA People Power Revolution which ousted strongman President Ferdinand Marcos. He was congressman for Makati from 1992 to 2001 and a senator from 2001 to 2013. Philippine Bar Association's Most Distinguished Award for Justice as a "man beholden to no one except to his country" and a Senate Resolution No. 100 enacted in the 8th Congress commending him for his invaluable services to the Filipino people.
Francisco Tatad	A native from Catanduanes, former senator of the Philippines (1992–2001)
Jesse Robredo	Secretary of the Interior and Local Government and former Naga City mayor
Irene Cortes	She was a former associate justice of the Supreme Court of the Philippines / First female dean of the UP College of Law
Shalani Soledad-Romulo	Valenzuela representative and TV host
Joseph Santiago	Congressman for two terms 2004 and 2007. He is a former executive of Pilipino Telephone Corporation. Serves as commissioner of the National Telecommunications Commission, and from 1997 to 1998, he served as team manager of the Mobiline Cellulars professional basketball team in the Philippine Basketball Association.
Leandro Verceles Sr.	Philippine ambassador, governor, Philippine immigration commissioner, initiator of the Catanduanes Circumferential Road, initiator of the ARDCI, a micro-lending strategy that eventually led to the nationally acclaimed Vision Bank.
Leandro Verceles Jr.	Congressman (1992–2001), governor (2001–2006), principal author of the Philippine E-Commerce Act that paved the way for the burgeoning $20b BPO industry in the Philippines.
Arnulfo Fuentebella	House of Representatives of the Philippines 11th Congress speaker of the House (2000 -2001)
Gina Vera-Perez de Venecia	She is daughter of the famed star-builder of Sampaguita Pictures, then Doc Jose Perez and Azucena Vera-Perez. She is married to Jose de Venecia, Jr., Speaker of the House of Representatives of the Philippines from 1992 to 1998 and 2001 to 2008.
José María Panganiban	A Filipino propagandist, linguist, and essayist. He was one of the main writers and contributors for La Solidaridad, writing under the pen names "Jomapa" and "J.M.P." The municipality of Jose Panganiban in Camarines Norte—formerly known as Mambulao—is named after him.
Crispin Beltran	A Filipino labor leader. Former member of 13th Congress of the Philippines with the Anakpawis ("Toiling Masses") party-list and former chair of Kilusang Mayo Uno (KMU), a militant and progressive labor movement.
Romulo Espaldon	A former military officer, politician, civil servant and diplomat who was the first naval officer to attain the rank of Rear Admiral in the Philippine Navy. As a civilian, he became ambassador to Saudi Arabia, Yemen, Egypt, Somalia and Sudan in different time periods. He held two political p positions, such as being Tawi-Tawi's first governor (1973-1974) and a lone district representative of Tawi-Tawi (1990-1992). Born in Donsol, Sorsogon to Christian Bicolano teachers but raised in Tawi-Tawi where his parents were sent to teach and he became exposed into Tausug and Sama cultures and converted to Islam at a yong age, which soon earned him a position as a first Commissioner (later Minister) of Muslim Affairs.

Arts and literature
Name	Information
Merlinda Carullo Bobis	Born in Legazpi City, she is a contemporary Filipino writer and academic in Australia

Sports
Name	Information
Bernabe Concepcion	A native of Catanduanes and Filipino featherweight boxer
Don Trollano	A native from Gigmoto. He is a Filipino professional basketball player for the NLEX Road Warriors of the Philippine Basketball Association (PBA).
Reil Cervantes	From Virac. Is a Filipino professional basketball player for Blackwater Elite in the Philippine Basketball Association (PBA). He was drafted 9th by Barangay Ginebra Kings in the 2011 PBA draft. In 2014, he was drafted 2nd overall by Kia Sorento in the 2014 PBA Expansion Draft.

Entertainment industry
Name	Information
John Arcilla	Is a multi-awarded Filipino movie actor and environmentalist.
Nora Aunor	Multi-awarded Filipino actress, singer and producer.
Janelle Quintana Manahan	Teen actress/Best New Female Artist (19th Aliw Awards) nominee
Enchong Dee	Born Ernest Lorenzo Dee, is an actor in Naga City, director and model, and an international competitive swimmer. He came to prominence after starring in Katorse (2009).
AJ Dee	Born Angel James Dee III in Naga City, is an actor and an international competitive swimmer. He played the role of Tony Javier in the play A Portrait of an Artist.
Robin Padilla	Film/TV Actor and model popularly known as the "Bad Boy of Philippine Movies". Also an incumbent senator after topping the 2022 senatorial polls.
Eddie Garcia	Born in Juban. Popularly known as "Manoy", he was a Filipino film actor and film director. A former member of the Philippine Scouts in Okinawa during World War II. Also a member of the Philippine Military Academy Marangal Class of 1974, alongside First Gentleman Mike Arroyo.
Eddie Ilarde	Radio and television host. Born in Iriga. Also served political positions such as becoming councilor of Pasay, congressman, and assemblyman.
Wally Bayola	Is a Filipino comedian, singer and actor born and raised in Naga City. He is best known appearing alongside his co-tandem Jose Manalo on the noon-time television variety show E.A.T.
Gary V.	Is a Filipino musician. Also known as "Mr. Pure Energy", Valenciano has released 26 albums, and won the Awit Awards for "Best Male Performer" eleven times. In 1998, he became UNICEF Philippines first National Ambassador.
Imelda Papin	Is a Filipino singer and one of the bigger names in the Philippine music industry. Dubbed the "Sentimental Songstress", Imelda Papin is responsible for songs such as "Bakit (Kung liligaya ka sa piling ng iba)" and "Isang Linggong Pag-ibig". Born in Presentacion, she also served as vice governor of Camarines Sur from 2019 to 2022.
Kyla	Melanie Calumpad Alvarez in real name. Kyla is a Filipino R&B singer-songwriter, producer, occasional actress and presenter dubbed as the Philippines' "Queen of R&B".
Paolo Gumabao	Born Paul Chen, is a Filipino actor and model. He is from Virac.
Carmen Camacho	1960s Philippine Kundiman Diva
Noel Cabangon	Is a Filipino folk singer and composer, formerly of the band Buklod. He is known for composing socially-relevant songs such as Kanlungan and Tatsulok.
Jericho Rosales	Is a Filipino cinema and television actor, model, singer, and songwriter.
Aga Muhlach	Actor, model, host and former matinée idol of Philippine movies.
Beatriz Saw	Actress, TV host and Pinoy Big Brother Season 2 big winner
Barbie Imperial	Actress and model
Lino Brocka	Multi-awarded film director. Co-founded the organization Concerned Artists of the Philippines (CAP) and the Free the Artist Movement. Born in Pilar, Sorsogon.
Allen Ansay	Born in Sagñay, Camarines Sur, actor and was the first runner-up of StarStruck (season 7)
Carmelle Collado	Born in Sipocot, Camarines Sur, singer and was the grand winner of Tawag ng Tanghalan and the winner of the inaugural edition of Eurovision Song Contest Asia in 2026

Modeling and fashion
Name	Information
Lara Quigaman	Born in Naga City. Film/TV actress, model, host and Miss International 2005 winner.
Venus Raj	Beauty queen, TV personality, model, and actress. She was crowned Binibining Pilipinas-Universe 2010. Fourth runner-up in 2010 Miss Universe pageant.
Miriam Quiambao	Is a Filipina television personality, occasional actress and 1st runner up at the Miss Universe 1999 pageant.
Bea Rose Santiago	Fords model and Miss International 2013 winner. She was born in Cataingan, Masbate.
Yvethe Marie Santiago	Graduated in Bicol University College of Business Economics and Management Binibining Pilipinas Supranational 2014 winner.
Christi McGarry	A Filipino-American model and beauty pageant titleholder crowned Miss Intercontinental 2015 First runner-up.
Rachel Peters	A Filipino-British model and beauty pageant titleholder who was crowned Miss Universe Philippines 2017
Catriona Gray	A Filipino-Australian model and beauty pageant titleholder who was crowned Miss World Philippines 2016 and Miss Universe Philippines 2018

Religion
Name	Information
Jose Tomas Sanchez	Born in Naga City. Roman Catholic Prefect Emeritus of the Congregation for the Clergy and Cardinal Priest from the Philippines
Mike Velarde	Tele-evangelist, founder and Servant-Leader of El Shaddai DWXI-PPFI
Jorge Barlin	Born in Baao. First native-born Filipino bishop.
