= Bisakol languages =

Bisayan languages spoken in the Bicol Region

Bisakol
- Bisákol
- Geographic distribution: Masbate, Sorsogon, some parts of the administrative Visayas regions
- Ethnicity: Visayans, Bicolanos
- Linguistic classification: Austronesian: Malayo-Polynesian; Philippine; Greater Central Philippine; Central Philippine; Bisakol
- Subdivisions: Masbate Sorsoganon Gubat Sorsoganon Masbateño

Language codes

Bisakol (portmanteau of Bisaya and Bikol) is an informal term for the three Bisayan languages spoken in the Bicol Region.

These languages include "Sorsoganon", namely Northern Sorsogon (Masbate Sorsogon) and Southern Sorsogon (Waray Sorsogon). The latter is spoken in seven municipalities in Southern Sorsogon, viz. Matnog, Gubat, Bulan, Irosin, Sta. Magdalena, Barcelona and Bulusan. Northern Sorsogon is closely related to Masbateño (hence, the alternate name Masbate Sorsogon), while Southern Sorsogon is closely related to the cross-strait Waray spoken in Northern Samar.

Also included is Masbateño of Masbate, which is closer to the languages of Panay: Capiznon and Hiligaynon. For geopolitical purposes, it might retain some Bicolano influence from the province's inclusion in the Bicol Region.

On the Ethnologue map of the region, Masbate Sorsogon is 82, Masbatenyo is 85 and Waray Sorsogon is 83.

== Classification ==
According to Zorc, the Bisakol languages all classify under the Central Bisayan group.

- Bisayan
  - other Bisayan
  - Central Bisayan
    - Romblomanon
    - Peripheral
      - - Northern Sorsoganon
        - Minasbate
      - Porohanon
      - Bantayanon
      - Hiligaynon
    - Warayan
      - Southern Sorsoganon
      - Waray
        - Northern Samar
        - - Samar-Leyte (Central)
          - Waray (Southern)

== Vocabulary ==
The following examples are taken from McFarland, in comparison with other Bikol area languages as well as some Bisayan languages from Zorc.

=== Pronouns ===
Bisayan languages					Tagalog	Bikol languages			
Minasbate	N. Sor.	S. Sor.	Central Waray	Hiligaynon	Tagalog	Pandan	Legazpi	Daraga	Iriga
Nominative
aku	aku	aku	ako	ako	ako	ako	ako	ako	ako
ikaw	ikaw	ikaw	ikaw	ikaw	ikaw	ikaw	ika	ika	ika
siya	siya	siya	hiya	siya	siya	siya	siya	sya	iya
kita	kita	kita	kita	kita	tayo	kita	kita	kita	kita
kami	kami	kami	kami	kami	kami	kami	kami	kami	kami
kamu	kamu	kamu	kamu	kamu	kayo	kamu	kamo	kamo	kamo
sinda	sinda	síra	hira	sila	sila	síla	sinda	sinda	sira
Genitive
ku	ku	ku	nákon/ko	nákon/ko	ko	ko	ko	ko	ko
mu	mu	mu	nímo/mo	nímo/mo	mo	mo	mo	mo	mo
níya	níya	níya	níya	níya	niya	níya	niya	nya	nya
nátun	nátun	ta	náton	náton	nátin	náto'	niato/ta	ta	ta
námun	námun	mi	námon	námon	námin	námo'	niamo/mi	mi	namo
níyu	níyu	níyu	níyo	nínyo	niyo	ninyo	nindo	nindu	niyo
ninda	ninda	níra	níra	níla	nila	níla	ninda	ninda	nira
