= Southern Sorsogon language =

Austronesian language spoken in the Philippines

Southern Sorsogon
- Waray Sorsogon
- Native to: Philippines
- Region: Sorsogon
- Native speakers: (185,000 cited 1975 census)
- Language family: Austronesian: Malayo-Polynesian; Philippine; Central Philippine; Bisayan; Central Bisayan; Warayan; Southern Sorsogon

Language codes
- ISO 639-3: srv
- Glottolog: wara1299 Waray Sorsogon
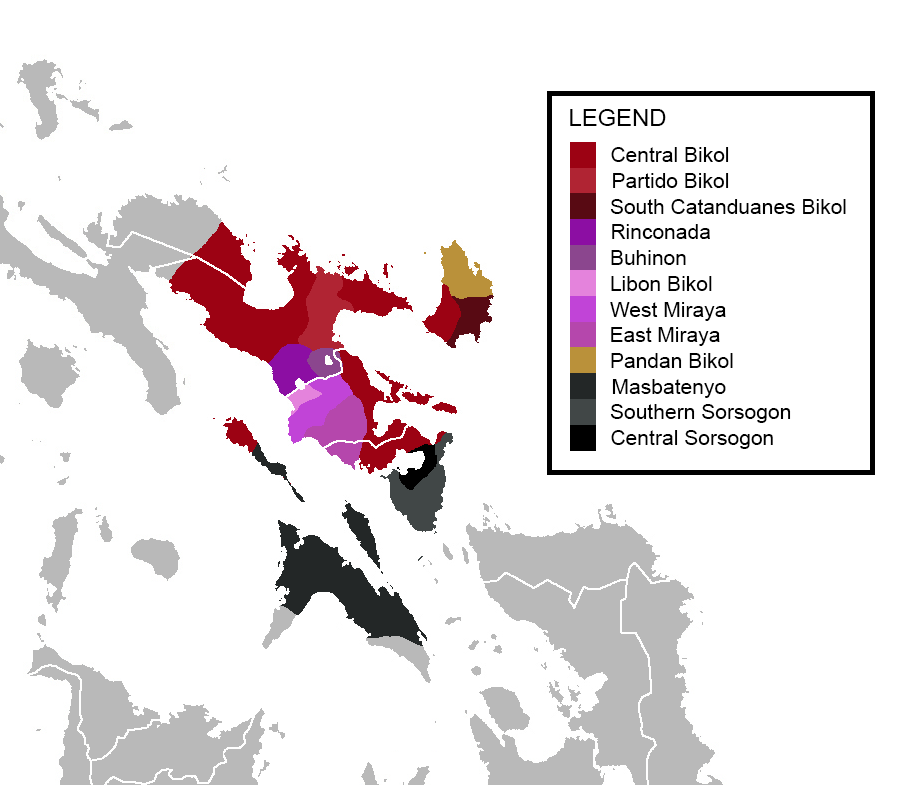

Southern Sorsogon (also known as Waray Sorsogon, Gubat) is a Bisayan language spoken in the southern part of Sorsogon, Philippines, in the municipalities of Gubat, Barcelona, Bulusan, Santa Magdalena, Matnog, Bulan, and Irosin. Although located in the Bicol Region, Southern Sorsogon belongs to the Warayan Bisayan subgroup, and is mutually intelligible to Waray which is spoken to the south on the neighboring island of Samar. The other two Bisayan languages spoken in the Bicol Region (Region V) are Masbate Sorsogon and Masbateño.

== Phonology ==
Southern Sorsogon has the following phoneme inventory:

Vowels
	Front	Central	Back
Close	i		u
Close			ʊ
Open		a	

Consonants
		Labial	Alveolar	Palatal	Velar	Glottal
Plosive	voiceless	p	t		k	ʔ
Plosive	voiced	b	d		ɡ	
Fricative			s			h
Nasal		m	n		ŋ	
Lateral			l			
Trill			r			
Semivowel				j	w	

== Grammar ==
=== Personal pronouns ===
Southern Sorsogon has three personal pronoun sets.

	nominative	genitive	oblique
1st person singular	aku	ku	akuʔ
2nd person singular	ikaw, ka	mu	imu
3rd person singular	siya	niya	kaniya
1st person plural inclusive	kita	ta	atuʔ
1st person plural exclusive	kami	mi	amuʔ
2nd person plural	kamu	niyu	iyu
3rd person plural	sira	nira	kanira

=== Deictic pronouns ===
Southern Sorsogon has three deictic pronoun sets.

	nominative	genitive	oblique
this, here (near speaker & addressee)	ini	sini	dini
that, there (near addressee)	yuʔun	suʔun	duʔun
yon, over there (remote)	idtu, yadtu	sadtu	didtu

=== Noun case markers ===
Southern Sorsogon has three noun case marker sets.

	nominative	genitive		oblique
	nominative	definite	indefinite	oblique
Common	an	san	sin	sa
Personal singular	si	ni		kan
Personal plural	sira	nira		kanda

=== Verbs ===
Verbs in Southern Sorsogon are inflected for focus and aspect.

	completed	progressive	anticipative	infinitive	imperative
Actor focus	nag-/⟨un⟩ naN-	nag-CV- naN-CV-	má- maN-CV-	mag-/⟨un⟩ maN-	pag-/∅ paN-
Patient focus	⟨in⟩	C⟨in⟩V-	CV- -un	-un	-a
Locative focus	⟨in⟩ -an	C⟨in⟩V- -an	CV- -an	-an	-i
Instrument focus	⟨in⟩	C⟨in⟩V-	i-CV-	i-	-an

== Vocabulary ==
=== Numbers ===
Southern Sorsogon has the following numbers:

English	Tagalog	Southern Sorsogon	Waray
one	isá	sayúʔ	usá/sayúʔ
two	dalawá	duwá	duhá/duwá
three	tatló	tulú	tulú
four	apat	upát	upát
five	limá	limá	limá
six	anim	unúm	unúm
seven	pitó	pitú	pitú
eight	waló	walú	walú
nine	siyám	s(i)yám	s(i)yám
ten	sampoʔ	napúluʔ	napúluʔ

== See also ==
- Waray language
- Waray people
- Masbateño language
- Bisakol languages
- Visayans
