= Northern Sorsogon language =

Austronesian language spoken in the Philippines

Northern Sorsogon
- Masbate Sorsogon
- Native to: Philippines
- Region: Sorsogon
- Native speakers: (85,000 cited 1975)
- Language family: Austronesian: Malayo-Polynesian; Philippine; Greater Central Philippine; Central Philippine; Bisayan; Central Bisayan; Peripheral; Masbate-Sorsogon; Northern Sorsogon

Language codes
- ISO 639-3: bks
- Glottolog: masb1237 Masbate Sorsogon
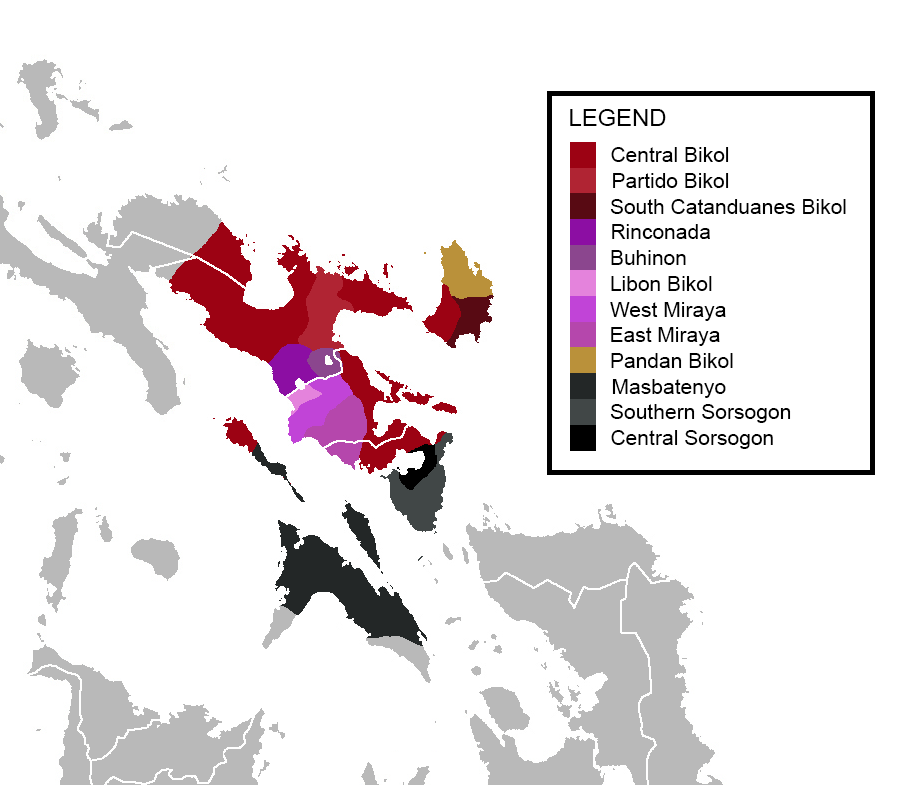

Northern Sorsogon (also Masbate Sorsogon, Northern Sorsoganon, Sorsogon Bicolano) is a Bisayan language spoken in the central part of Sorsogon, Philippines, in Sorsogon City and the municipalities of Casiguran, and Juban. It is closely related to, but distinct from Southern Sorsogon which is spoken in the southern part of Sorsogon.

It is one of the three Bisayan languages spoken in the Bicol region, next to Southern Sorsogon and Masbateño.

== Phonology ==
Vowels
	Front	Central	Back
Close	i		u
Open		a	

Consonants
		Labial	Alveolar	Palatal	Velar	Glottal
Plosive	voiceless	p	t		k	ʔ
Plosive	voiced	b	d		ɡ	
Fricative	voiceless		s			h
Fricative	voiced		z			ɦ
Nasal		m	n		ŋ	
Lateral			l			
Trill			r			
Semivowel				j	w	
