= Masbatenyo language =

Bisayan language spoken in the Philippines

Masbatenyo
- Masbateño
- Minasbate
- Native to: Philippines
- Region: Masbate province (almost whole portion of Masbate island proper, entire Ticao island and southern half of Burias island)
- Ethnicity: Masbateño people
- Native speakers: 680,000 (2010)
- Language family: Austronesian: Malayo-Polynesian; Philippine; Greater Central Philippine; Central Philippine; Bisayan; Central Bisayan; Masbate-Sorsogon; Masbatenyo

Language codes
- ISO 639-3: msb
- Glottolog: masb1238
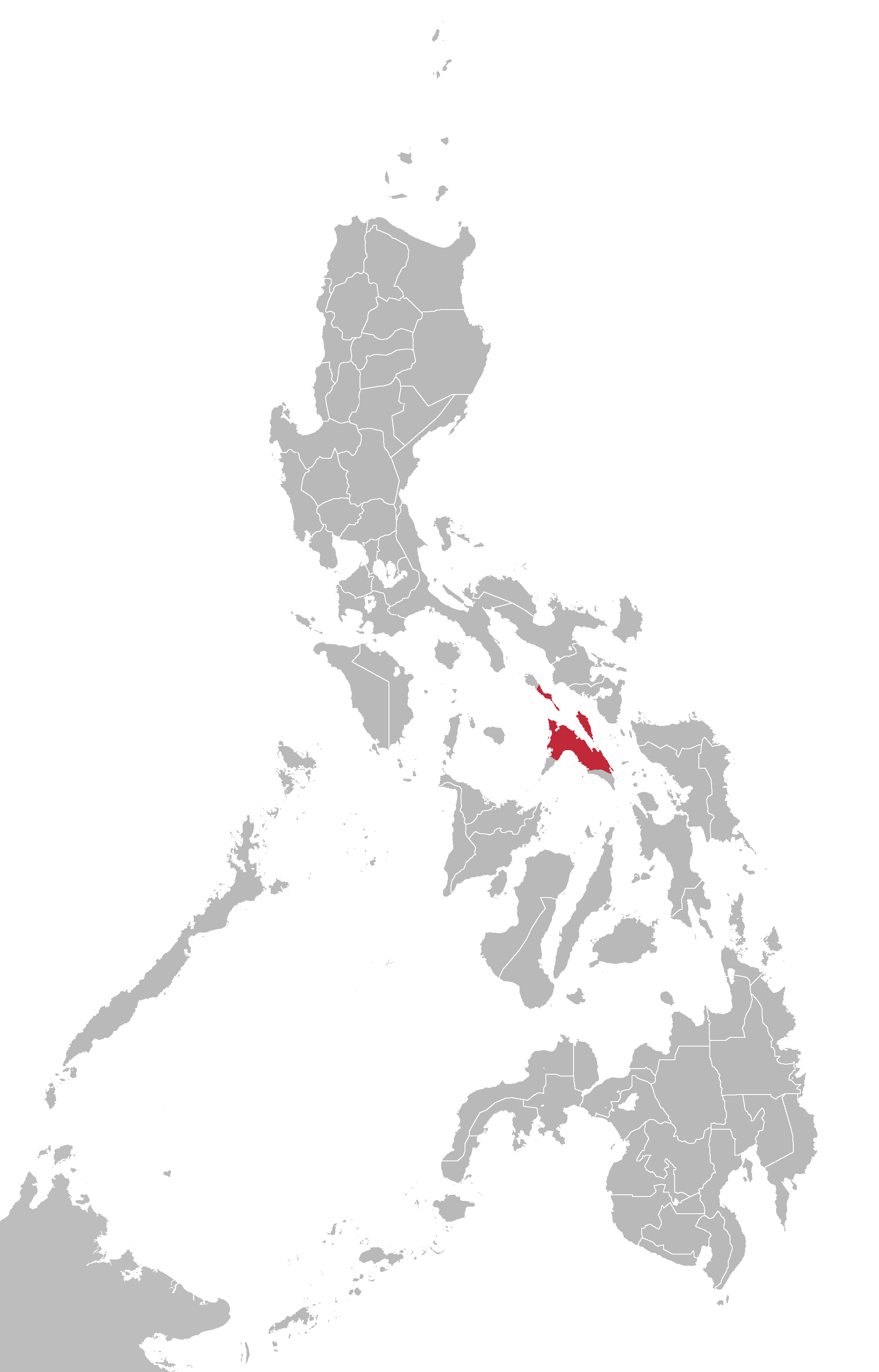
- Areas where Masbateño is spoken

Masbatenyo, Masbateño or Minasbate is a member of Central Philippine languages and of the Bisayan subgroup of the Austronesian language family and spoken by more than 724,000 people in the province of Masbate and some parts of Sorsogon in the Philippines. Masbatenyo (sometimes written as Masbateño) is the name used by the speakers of the language and for themselves, although the term Minásbate is sometimes also used to distinguish the language from the people. It has 350,000 speakers as of 2002, with 50,000 who speak it as their first language. About 250,000 speakers use it as their second language.

Masbatenyo is closely related to Capiznon, with 79% lexical similarity, and Hiligaynon, with 76% lexical similarity. Waray language is closely related and significantly similar to Masbatenyo as well. It is also closely related to Waray Sorsogon language, the language of Sorsogon. This is because Masbate was once part of Sorsogon Province and was governed from Sorsogon City until the 1920s. It has three major dialects: the western dialect centered around the town of Balud on the western coast which is close to Capiz, the southern dialect centered about the town of Cataingan in the southeastern part of Masbate, and the northern dialect covering the whole northern half of Masbate and centered on Masbate City.

== Etymology ==
There are several accounts on the origins of the word Masbate. One account says that it came from the words masa 'to mix' and batî 'to beat'. The other account says it came from mas batî 'heard better' as in Lumúsad kamó kag umapíke agúd mas batî an íyo ginasábi 'Get down here and get closer so that we can hear better whatever you're saying.' Another account further says that it came from the term that Cebuano migrants used to describe the place, mas batí, which means 'a place where living condition is worse'.

According to a certain Fray Martin de Rada, Masbate took its name from Masbat or Basbat which means 'having many gold mines'. Another claims that the name Masbate came from Masbad. The term Masbad possibly originated from Masbaranon, a barrio that used to be part of the jurisdiction of the Municipality of Placer but is now under the Municipality of Esperanza. This barrio used to be called Surosimbahan because it looks like a church. Its name was then changed Agoho from the tree called agoho. Then, for the third time, its name was changed to Masbaranon because of the supposed abundance of small fish called masbad.

== Dialects ==
Wolfenden identified three major dialects of Masbatenyo: the western dialect centered around the town of Balud on the western coast which is close to Capiz, the southern dialect centered about the town of Cataingan in the southeastern part of Masbate and the northern dialect covering the whole northern half of Masbate and centered on Masbate City, the capital.

Language and/or Dialect Used in the Municipalities of Masbate
Municipality	Language and/or Dialect Used
Burias Island, First Congressional District
Claveria	Masbatenyo
Claveria	Masbatenyo with strong Cebuano influence
Claveria	Masbatenyo with Bikol influence
San Pascual	Cebuano with Masbatenyo influence
San Pascual	Bikol with Masbatenyo influence
San Pascual	Masbatenyo with strong Cebuano influence
Ticao Island, Second Congressional District
Batuan	Masbatenyo with strong Waray influence
Monreal	Masbatenyo with strong Waray influence
San Fernando	Masbatenyo with strong Waray influence
San Jacinto	Masbatenyo with strong Waray influence
Second Congressional District
Aroroy	Masbatenyo
Baleno	Masbatenyo
Balud	Hiligaynon with Masbatenyo influence
Mandaon	Masbatenyo with strong Hiligaynon influence
Mandaon	Hiligaynon with Masbatenyo influence
Masbate City	Masbatenyo
Milagros	Masbatenyo
Mobo	Masbatenyo
Third Congressional District
Cawayan	Cebuano with Masbatenyo influence
Cataingan	Cebuano with Masbatenyo influence
Cataingan	Masbatenyo with strong Waray influence
Cataingan	Masbatenyo with strong Cebuano influence
Dimasalang	Cebuano with Masbatenyo influence
Dimasalang	Masbatenyo with strong Waray influence
Dimasalang	Masbatenyo with strong Cebuano influence
Dimasalang	Masbatenyo
Esperanza	Cebuano with Masbatenyo influence
Palanas	Cebuano with Masbatenyo influence
Palanas	Masbatenyo with strong Waray influence
Palanas	Masbatenyo with strong Cebuano influence
Palanas	Masbatenyo
Pio V. Corpuz	Cebuano with Masbatenyo influence
Placer	Cebuano
Uson	Cebuano with Masbatenyo influence
Uson	Masbatenyo with strong Cebuano influence
Uson	Masbatenyo

== Masbatenyo and its neighboring languages ==
Wolfenden reported that although Sorsogon (the southernmost province of Bicol) and Masbate are very much closer to the Bicol Peninsula, Sorsoganon and Masbatenyo shared the same grammatical systems, which are rather closer to those of Waray and Hiligaynon, the trade languages in the Visayas, rather than to Bicol.

The presence of competing grammatical and lexical subsystems in the language is the most striking characteristic of Masbatenyo. This has probably been brought on by the influx of settlers from surrounding major language groups who mixed in elements of their language with and alongside the Masbatenyo. This results in several semantic concepts that can be expressed by two to five alternate words for a single concept.

This led Wolfenden to think that Masbatenyo is unique in the sense of its being a mixed-up language. Speakers of the language often thought that their language is just a mixture of its neighboring languages, which are Bikol, Waray-Waray, Cebuano, Hiligaynon and Tagalog. There are still those who refer to their own speech as 'Bisaya'.

Masbatenyo shares different types of mutual intelligibility with its neighboring languages. Speakers of Masbatenyo can easily and conveniently converse with speakers of the neighboring languages using their own language. However, speakers of Cebuano, Waray or Hiligaynon would sometimes find it difficult to understand Masbatenyo because of its lexicon. Furthermore, Zorc considered Masbatenyo, together with Kinaray-a, Bulalakaw, Hiligaynon, Waray, and Surigaonon, as "linking dialects" because they serve as "centers of dialect complexes".

McFarland presented different views on the classification of the language spoken in Masbate. One view excluded Masbate and the southern part of Sorsogon from the Bikol area on the grounds that the language spoken in these areas was not Bikol. The other view considered the language as a dialect of Bikol.

Another claim on the language of Masbate was that 'the language and dialects of Masbate are basically Visayan, with the major influence being Cebuano.' Zorc made a subgrouping and reconstruction of the Bisayan dialects and included Masbatenyo in his work. He stated that while it is true that there are immigrants from the areas that speak Bikol, Cebuano and Hiligaynon languages, the "native dialect" throughout the island is Masbatenyo.

Zorc presented four types of intelligibility among the Bisayan languages and dialects: a) natural or primary intelligibility, where speakers of different dialects can communicate freely, even they never hear the other dialect before (e.g. Bulalakawnon and Ratagnon, Capiznon and Hiligaynon); b) learned or secondary intelligibility, where speakers can adjust to another dialect in a matter of time (e.g. Bulalakawnon and Aklanon); c) sesquilingualism, whereby a speaker is fluent in his native language (dialect), but can only understand (not speak) another (Waray and Cebuano, where speakers of both languages can understand both perfectly but speakers of Cebuano understand Waray poorly); and d) one-way intelligibility, whereby A understands B but B does not understand A.

Masbatenyo speakers in the town of Masbate belong to the fourth kind. The residents of the town can readily understand the speech of the outsiders, but the outsiders cannot understand the speech of the locals. Speakers can understand Sorsoganon, Capiznon, Hiligaynon, and Cebuano, but the latter experience varying degrees of difficulty in understanding Masbatenyo.

Regarding the duration of the Bisayan occupancy of the Central Philippines, Zorc reported that there are no pre-Hispanic writings that would account for their existence in the area. Zorc stipulated that current speakers of many of the Bisayan languages and dialects could have given up their original languages long ago in favor of an intrusive or more prestigious language, or in favor of the language already spoken in the region that they invaded and conquered.

== Orthography ==
In 2016, researchers from the Dr. Emilio B. Espinosa Sr. Memorial State College of Agriculture and Technology (DEBESMSCAT) together with the members of newly established Minasbate Language Society, composed of various stakeholders from Masbate, developed a working orthography on the language based on the discussions in the 1st Minasbate Orthography Congress.

The Minasbate Working Orthography distinguishes between the native Minasbate orthography and the extended working orthography.

=== Native Minasbaté Orthography ===
1. The following symbols are used in the native Minasbaté orthography:
  Aa, Bb, Dd, Gg, Hh, Ii, Kk, Ll, Mm, Nn, NGng, Pp, Rr, Ss, Tt, Uu, Ww, Yy, ` (for glottal stop)
2. Minasbaté has three phonemic vowels (V): Aa, Ii, Uu and 16 consonants (C): Bb, Dd, Gg, Hh, Kk, Ll, Mm, Nn, NGng, Pp, Rr, Ss, Tt, Ww, Yy, ` (for glottal stop).
3. The glottal stop is a distinct consonant sound in Minasbaté and part of its alphabet. The grave accent ( ` ) will be used to represent the glottal stop.
  - The glottal stop may occur between a C and V, e.g pus`on, bag`o
  - It may also occur in the final position of the word, e.g. túro`, pakó`
  - The glottal may also occur between two V, e.g. ti`il, di`in, gu`ol,
  - The glottal stop is also the obligatory onset of the written syllable that begins with a vowel. It will be symbolized when the word begins with a vowel, e.g. `adlaw, `ako, `amó`
4. The syllable pattern of Minasbaté words is CV and CVC, e.g. ba.láy = CV.CVC.
  - All Cs can occur in the beginning of a word (onset) or ending (coda). Examples: pahá` 'thirsty,' dakóp 'to catch'
  - All Vs are used to form a syllable nucleus. Examples:ba.láy, `a.kó
5. In writing stress or accent, the acute accent ( ' ) above the V is used, e.g. buháy, 'alive', dakó`, 'big', ribók 'noise'.
  - A stressed non-final syllable is usually lengthened. For example, in the case of búhay 'life' vs buháy 'alive', the syllable bú in 'life' is longer than the syllable bu in 'alive'.
  - It is possible to have more than one stress in a word, e.g. hámabáw, `ámamáknit.
  - The stress is symbolized by the acute accent ( ' ) if it falls on the last syllable, e.g. hubág, sulód. The stress may not be symbolized if it falls on the penultimate syllable, e.g. gab`i 'night', kiray 'eyebrow'.

=== Extended Orthography ===
The inclusion of borrowed terms in native Minasbaté vocabulary has resulted in the change in the structure of the language. There is a need to develop an extended orthography to accommodate these words.

1. The extended orthography will consist of the following:
  Aa "ey", Bb "bi", Cc "si", Dd "di", Ee "I", Ff "ef", Gg "ji", Hh "eych", Ii "ay", Jj "jey", Kk "key", Ll "el", Mm "em", Nn "en", Ññ "enye", NGng "en ji", Oo "o", Pp "pi", Qq "kyu", Rr "ar", Ss "es", Tt "ti", Uu "yu", Vv "vi", Ww "dobol yu", Xx "eks", Yy "way", Zz "zi", ` (for glottal stop)
2. All Minasbaté words (native and borrowed) use a, i, e, o and u. The "i" and "e" are indistinct and alternate in written native words and so are/do "o" and "u." The alternation rules are explained below. The "i" and "e" are distinct in borrowed words (e.g. misa vs. mesa).
3. The use of the back vowels "u" and "o":
  - If the word has only one back vowel sound that occurs in the ultimate position, o is used. Examples: pitó, lisód, li`og, didto, `amó, itóm, nano, ka`aralo. Exceptions: kun
  - If the word has more than two back vowels, u is used in the second or third to the last syllable and o is used in the final syllable. Examples: kudkód, bukbók, gu`ól, pumuluyo`, burubaruto, `uru`adlaw, alu`alo, tudló`, katuninungan
  - O in borrowed words is retained in writing. Example: ospital, obra, oro
4. The use of front vowels "i" and "e":
  - All Minasbaté words with an "i" sound will be written as i. Examples: kilmi`, di`ín, didí, silhig, `ikog, tindog, `iní, sin
  - e in borrowed words will be retained in writing. Examples: eroplano, ahente, karné, `onse, dose, nwebe, kwento; i will be used to represent the front vowel ("i") that is added in the original form of borrowed words. Examples: `istorya for storia, `isponsor for sponsor, `ismagol for smuggle
5. The hyphen will be used in the following instances:
  - Reduplication of full words, e.g. tawu-tawo 'toy', balay-balay 'little house', kalan-kalan 'improvised stove'
  - Compound words, e.g. tagúm-matá 'conjunctivitis', supa`-tulon 'very easy', atras-abante 'indecisive'
  - Affixation of borrowed words that are proper names, e.g. pa-LBC, pa-Manila
  - Time expressions, e.g. `alas-dose, `ala-una, `alas-diye
6. The hyphen will be used in the following instances:
  - Partial reduplication of the word, e.g. burubaruto, not *buru-baruto; burubugsay, not *buru-bugsay
  - Affixation of native root words, e.g. ginaka`on, not *gina-kaun; ginsusog, not *gin-susog
  - Affixation of borrowed verbs and nouns, e.g. magtext, not *mag-text; pamerkado, not *pamerkado
  - Linkers, duha ka bilog, not duha ka-bilog.
7. In writing borrowed words, the equivalent sounds in the native Minasbaté will be used to represent the borrowed sounds. The following symbols are used to represent the borrowed sounds:

Borrowed letters	Minasbaté letters	Examples
c when followed by o, u, or a	k	kwarto for cuarto
c when followed by i or e	s	sentimo for centimo
ch	ts	tsokolate for chocolate
f	p	pyesta for fiesta
j	h	Hulyo for Julio
ll	y or ly	lyabe for llave
ñ	ny	Hunyo for Juño
q	k	kwestyon vs question
v	b	lyabe for llave
x	ks	taksi for taxi
z	S	sigsag for zigzag

8. Consonant clusters exist in both native and borrowed words in Minasbaté.

- In representing the off-glides or the sequence of u and w, and i and y, the vowels are dropped and the w and y are used, e.g. pwede instead of puwede, sya instead of siya, kwento instead of kuwento.

Consonant Clusters	Examples
pl	plato
pr	prito
pw	pwerta
py	pyano
tr	trapo
tw	twerka
ty	tyán
kl	klaro
kr	krus
kw	kwento
bl	blangko
br	braso
bw	bweno
by	Byernes
dr	drama
dw	dwende
dy	dyis
gl	glorya
gr	grasya
gw	gwapo
my	myintras
sw	swerte
sy	sya
hw	hwebes

9. The apostrophe symbol ( ' ) is used in contracted words. The particles san and sin are often contracted to the immediately preceding word if it ends in either a glottal or vowel sound. The unstressed vowel can also be deleted in fast speech.

damó` sin kwarta	damo'n kwarta
wara` sin tawo	wara'n tawo
darahán	dar'hán
nano man	na'man
`idto `an	`idto'n
sadto san	sadto'n
`ina` `an	`ina'n

== Phonology ==
Masbatenyo has 19 segmental phonemes: 16 consonant sounds /p, t, k, b, d, g, m, n, ŋ, l, r, w, j, s, h, ʔ/ and three vowel sounds /a, ɪ, ʊ/. Post-alveolar sounds /ʃ, tʃ, dʒ/ are also present as a result of loanwords. /ɪ/ has the mid front unrounded, lax vowel [ɛ] (written orthographically as e) as its variant; /ʊ/ has the mid back rounded lax [ɔ] (written orthographically as o) as its variant. The sound [ɛ] only appears in loan words from English and Spanish and occurs in free variation with [ɪ]. Similarly, the sound [ɔ] is a variant of [ʊ] and its occurrence might have been brought by the interaction with the Tagalog language and the incorporation of Spanish and English loan words in Masbatenyo language.

The glottal stop /ʔ/ is the conventional onset of the orthographically vowel-initial words, thus vowels cannot occur in initial position. They only occur in medial and final position.

There are two major syllable patterns in Masbatenyo, namely, open syllable /C(C)V, (C(C)VC)/ and closed syllable /CVC/. Most root words in Masbatenyo are disyllabic (they are composed of two syllables) and follows the CV(C).CV(C) pattern. There are monosyllabic words; however, most of them are functors that have no lexical meaning. Most of the disyllabic words contain an affix, reduplicated or compound.

Masbatenyo also has a suprasegmental phoneme, the stress, which is characterized by vowel length. The acoustic analysis of stress correlates using Praat showed that duration is the most consistent factor that characterizes stress. Stressed syllables are longer than their unstressed counterparts.

The diphthongs in Masbatenyo are: [aw] in sabaw 'soup', [ɪw] in agiw 'soot', [aj] in balay 'house', and [ʊj] or [ɔj] in baboy 'pig'.

Consonant clusters are non-native to Masbatenyo phonology. Their occurrence in the language is brought by the entry of borrowed words from Spanish and English.

The form of a morpheme can change when they are combined to form words or phrases. Such changes are called mophophonemic changes. Among these changes are: vowel deletion; contraction of particles san and sin, assimilation, metathesis, epenthesis and degemination.

== Grammar ==
=== Word formation ===
Masbatenyo provides support for the claim that root words are pre-categorial or neutral by themselves. Take the following examples: Dakó 'big (size, abstract)' is a root which can express a property or state, as seen in: Dakó an baláy niya 'His house is big'. But it can also be combined with certain affixes to form a process verb in: Nagdaragkó na an atáman 'His pet has grown already.' It can also combine with a determiner, an, to form a noun in the context: Dilí ko nakita an pagdakó san báta niya 'I didn't see his child growing up.'

Dalágan is considered a verb when used in command form: Dalágan! 'Run!' But it can be analyzed as a noun in forms such as Malúya an dalágan san trak niya. 'His truck runs slowly.'

Masbatenyo employs the following operations in deriving new words:

1. Affixation, the process to which an affix is attached to a root or an 'intermediate stem; e.g. karaút + m- > maraút 'ugly';
2. Reduplication, the repetition of word or part of word to form a new word; e.g., barúto + PWr reduplication > baru-barúto 'mini boat';
3. Stress shift, e.g., báyad 'pay' > bayád 'paid'

However, the existence of bare root forms of modifiers (adjectives and adverbs) in Masbatenyo can also provide evidence that root forms also have lexical properties. Examples of this are lab`as 'fresh (fish)' versus lúb`ok 'rotten', hilaw 'raw' versus lutô 'cooked'.

=== Noun and noun phrases ===
Proper and common nouns are distinguishable from each other because they have their respective determiners; proper nouns are marked by si/sinda, ni/ninda, and kan/kanda while common nouns are accompanied by an, san/sin, and sa.

In Masbatenyo, there is a subgroup of common nouns that can be inflected as imitative. The imitative affix can be the reduplicative or the Curu- 'imitative/diminutive'. The reduplicative affix – the reduplication of the whole word – is applicable to a stem that is disyllabic and has open penult (CV). Regardless of the original position of the stress, the stress of the reduplicated form is always in the penult, such as in táwu 'man' > tawu-táwu 'toy'

The Curu- is attached to a stem that has more than two syllables. It also attaches to a stem that has a close penult (CVC). The stress does not shift after reduplication. An example of this is barúto 'boat' > burubarúto 'mini-boat'

Temporal nouns can also be reduplicated and affixed with Curu-. The meaning, however, is no longer imitative. It means 'every …' as illustrated in adláw 'day' > uru`adláw 'everyday'.

Nouns can also be derived from other word classes by adding nominalizing morphemes or voice affixes.

Nominalizing morphemes
Affix	Base	Meaning of Derivation	Examples	Root/Stem
-ero	N, V	occupation/profession	tindéro 'vendor'	tindá 'to sell'
ka-	V	reciprocal action	kaúpod 'companion'	upód 'accompany'
	N	result of the action	kautód 'piece'	utód 'cut'
para-	N, V	one who regularly does the action occupation/profession	paralába 'laundry washer' paratukdó 'teacher'	labá 'wash (laundry)' tukdó 'teach'
pagka-	N, V	nature, essence of ...	pagkatáwo 'human-ness	tawó 'human'
pag-	V	abstract entity/concept	pagkáon 'food'	káon 'to eat'
paN-	V	abstract entity/concept	pamatyág 'feeling'	batyág 'to feel'
taga-/tiga-	N	native of a certain place	taga-Manila 'native of Manila'	Manila 'Manila
taga-/tiga-	V	doer of a definite action	tagapudó 'harvester'	pudó 'harvest'
tika-	V	almost happening	tikaúran 'will rain'	urán 'rain'
tag-/ tig-	N	season/time of	tag`urán 'rainy season	urán 'rain'
tag-	N	owner of	tagbaláy 'owner of the house'	baláy 'house'
tig-	N	distributive	tig`urúsad 'one each'	usád 'one'

Nominalizing voice affix
Affix	Base	Gloss	Example	Root/Stem
-(h)an	N, V	location of a thing, action or process	atubángan 'in front of'	atúbang 'front'
-(h)an	V	Instrument	kanáman 'toy'	kánam 'play
-(h)an	V	someone addicted to a particular action	kawatán 'thief'	káwat 'to steal'
ka-STEM + -an	V	degree, quantity	karaútan 'ugliness'	raút 'ugly'
ka-STEM + -an	N	collection or group	ka`igmanghúdan 'brothers'	igmanghúd 'relative/brother'
ka-STEM + -an	N	place for N	kahadían 'kingdom'	hádi 'king'
-in-	V	resultant state	pinaláypay sinugbá 'smoked fish/meat'	palaypáy sugbá 'to smoke fish/meat'
	N	in the manner of	Minásbate 'Masbate style'	Masbáte 'Masbate'
-(h)un	N, V	made of/ has the quality of	langitnón 'heavenly'	lángit 'heaven'
-(h)un	N, V	something to be V-ed	anihún '(crop) to be harvested'	áni 'harvest'
-V_{r}- + -on	V	inherently V	sarawáyon 'mischievous'	sawáy 'mischief'

Masbatenyo employs three types of possession strategies:

1. possessive clauses (may and igwá and oblique phrases sa/kan)
2. lexical noun phrases (ni and san/sin constructions)
3. genitive case pronouns (personal and demonstrative pronouns)

=== Verbs ===
Masbatenyo verbs, like verbs in other Philippine languages, are marked for their voice, aspect and modality. Further, as Nolasco observed in Philippine languages, voice and tense/aspect/mode often interact and it is sometimes difficult to tease them apart.

==== Aspect ====
Masbatenyo is marked for aspect to show the condition of the action; whether it has begun or not, and whether it is viewed as a process or in a static state. What is important to the speakers is not a temporal relation of the activity to the moment of speaking, but the internal stages of the activity. It is not marked for tense since its action is not correlated with time.

Masbatenyo has the five aspects: infinitive or neutral, perfective, imperfective, prospective and recent perfective.

==== Mode ====
Mode describes the speakers' attitude toward a situation, including the speakers' belief in its reality, or likelihood (Payne 1997). It describes the view of the speaker as to how the action is done. The term mode, mood and modality are often used interchangeably. There are at least six types of mode that occur in Masbatenyo:

1. indicative
2. imperative
3. aptative/abilitative
4. reciprocal/social
5. causative
6. distributive

Summary of modes in Masbatenyo
Mode	Affix	Meaning
Indicative	um, m-, -an, -on, i-	action is performed
Imperative	-on, -an, -a, -i	request or command
Aptative	paka-	possibility/ accidental
Reciprocal	paki(g)	action is done together by the actor and the goal of the action; exchange of actions between two or more actors
Causative	pa-	the actor is the reason why the action is done but the actor is not doing the action
Distributive	pang-	plurality of an action or that an action is done repeatedly

=== Modifiers ===
In Masbatenyo, the so-called "adjectives" and "adverbs" are similar morphologically; hence, there exists no persuasive reasons for separating the modifiers of verbs and non-verbs.

Modifiers can either occur in their root forms or they can be inflected by affixes. The first type belongs to a class of unaffixed form of statives. These forms denote that the properties they exhibit are not derived from a process or those that are possessed innately by the thing being described. Examples are lab`as 'fresh (fish)' versus lúb`ok 'rotten', hilaw 'raw' versus lutô 'cooked'.

Affixed forms of the statives are classified according to the affix that attaches to their root forms. There are three types of affixed forms in Masbaenyo:

m- type
The subtype inflected for by the m- replacive affix expresses the state or attribute of the referent or entity being described, e.g., madulom 'dark'.
hi-/ha- type
The second subtype, which is inflected for by the hi-/ha-, is used to describe measurements (depth, height, length), e.g., harayo 'far'; hitaas 'high'.
those with voice affix.
The third subtype is affixed with voice affix.

Voice affixes deriving stative verbs
Affix	Lexical Base	Gloss	Examples	Stem/Root
-an	N, V	personal character	talawán 'coward'	tálaw 'cowardice'
	V	person performing action	kawatán 'thief'	káwat 'to steal'
<in>	N	manner	Minásbaté 'Masbatenyo style'	Masbáte 'Masbate'
ma- + -on	V	mental or physical qualities	malangáson 'joker'	langás 'joke'
maka-V_{1}r	Stative	making one become	makaarálo 'embarrassing'	álo 'shame'
-(a)-n-on	N	state /human modifier	langitnón 'heavenly'	lángit 'heaven'
-on	N, V	quality; description of a person	buwáon 'liar' tibíhon 'person suffering from tuberculosis'	búwà 'lie' tíbi 'tuberculosis'
para-	V	fond of habitual action	paralángas 'joker'	langás 'to joke'

Masbatenyo modifiers are inflected by means of affixes for four degrees of intensity: basic, comparative, superlative, and intensive.

- Mabuot na bátà si Chai. 'Chai is a kind child.' (Basic)
- Mas maganda si Benj. 'Benj is more beautiful.' (Comparative)
- Pinakamadagmit si Karl. 'Karl is the fastest.' (Superlative)

In Masbatenyo, intensive degree is expressed by the affix ka- accompanied by the non-obligatory particle man attached to bare forms (roots), e.g. Kaganda san boses ni Tinne. 'Tinne's voice is so beautiful.'

Intensive degree may also be expressed by Curu reduplication. ka- intensification also co-occurs with the Curu intensification. Katurutam`is saní na biko. 'This rice cake is very sweet.'

Adverbial properties in Masbatenyo are rather expressed by clitic particles such as na 'already', pa 'still', ngáni 'really', kunó 'reportedly', etc.

=== Pronouns ===
In Philippine-type languages, pronouns replace the full noun phrases in a clause. Pronouns, however, do not take the place of nouns in most expressions (e.g. an bata > siya, not an siya), but do so in oblique phrases (e.g. sa batà 'to the child' > sa iya 'to him/her').

There are five important types of pronouns in Philippine languages: personal pronouns, interrogative pronouns, demonstrative pronouns, reflexive pronouns and indefinite pronouns.

Personal pronouns refer to entities already mentioned in the discourse or known to the hearer. They are classified according to person, case and number.

Masbatenyo personal pronouns
			Gloss	Absolutive		Ergative		Genitive/ Oblique
			Gloss	free	clitic	free	clitic	free
1st person	singular		1SG	ako	=ako	ákon	=ko	ákon
1st person	plural	excl	1+2	kami	=kami	ámon	=námon	ámon
1st person	plural	incl	1+2PL	kita	=kita	áton	=náton	áton
2nd person	singular		2SG	ikaw	=ka/ikaw	ímo	=mo/nímo	ímo
2nd person	plural		2PL	kamo	=kamo	íyo	=níyo	íyo
3rd person	singular		3SG	siya	=siya	íya	=níya	íya
3rd person	plural		3PL	sinda	=sinda	índa	=nínda	índa

Demonstrative pronouns or deictics refer to entities in relation to distance, and space and also refer to their location on a timeline. In discourse, demonstratives are also used to track reference across clauses. They sometimes take the place of third personal pronouns.

Demonstrative pronouns in Masbatenyo
Spatial orientation	Absolutive (S/O)	Ergative (A)		Oblique
Spatial orientation	Absolutive (S/O)	Non-specific	Specific	Oblique
near speaker	iní	siní	saní	didî
near hearer	inâ	sinâ	sanâ	didâ
far from both	idtó	sidtó	sadtó	didtó

Interrogative pronouns are those that take place of the nouns in questions. Interrogatives are used when a concept is being questioned and to elicit information so that an item can be identified. The interrogative pronouns are sin`o 'who', náno 'what', pan`o 'how', san`o 'when', pirá 'how much', háin 'where', and diín 'where'.

Nano kay 'why' differs from the rest of interrogative words since it does not replace a noun phrase but an entire clause. It consists of the interrogative pronoun náno and the reason particle kay.

Reflexive pronouns are special words which refer to the same referent in a construction. It is made up of the word sadíri plus the relevant pronoun, as in the phrase sa sadíri niya or sa iya sadíri.

Indefinite pronouns refer to entities, persons, places or times which cannot be clearly established. The indefinite pronouns can either be expressed in two ways:

1. by the same form as the interrogatives plus the particle man
2. by the use of the connectors bísan 'even, including', máski 'even though' or kun 'if' plus interrogative word

Amó is a general pro-form that can be used to replace any noun, verb, modifier, or even whole clauses. Wolfenden refers to amó as the universal substitute. Amo is also used to track an antecedent in a previous sentence.

=== Numeral terms ===
Masbatenyo has native terms for numbers. However, in the domain of money and time, Spanish terms are used. Numerals typically go with nouns to specify the number of items talked about. They can also modify verbs and other predicates to indicate degree and quantity of action.

Numeral expressions in Masbatenyo
Numeral	Cardinal	Ordinal	Distributive	Time expression
one	isád/usad/uno	primiro	tig-isád/tig-usad	ala-úna
two	duwá/duhá/dos	ikaduwá	tigduwá	alas-dos
three	tuló/tres	ikatuló	tigtuló	alas-tres
four	upát/kwatro	ikaupát	tig-upát	alas-kwatro
five	lima/singko	ikalimá	tiglimá	alas-singko
six	unóm/sais	ikaunóm	tig-unóm	alas-sais
seven	pitó/syete	ikapitó	tigpitó	alas-syete
eight	waló/otso	ikawaló	tigwaló	alas-otso
nine	siyám/nwebe	ikasiyám	tigsyám	alas-nwebe
ten	napúlo/dyis	pangnapúlò	tignapúlò	alas-dyis
eleven	ónse	pang-ónse	tig-ónse	alas-ónse
twelve	dose	pandóse	tigdóse	alas-dóse
thirteen	trese	pantrese	tigtrese	
twenty	beynte	pambeynte	tigbeynte	
thirty	treynta	pantreynta	tigtreynta	
one-hundred	syin/isád ka gatús		tigsyin	
one thousand	mil/isád ka líbo		tig`isád ka líbo	

==== Basic mathematical operations ====
The following are basic mathematical operations in Masbateño:

- one plus one equals two (1 + 1 = 2) – An usad gindagdagan san usad, duha/duwa ka bilog
- two times two equals four (2 x 2 = 4) – An duwa ginpilô san duwa na bes, nagin upat
- eight minus five equals three (8 – 5 = 3) – An walo gin-ibanan san lima, tulo an nabilin
- nine divided by three equals three (9 ÷ 3 = 3) – An siyam ginbarahin sa tulo, tig-turulo

==== Advanced algebraic operations ====
The following are advanced algebraic operations in Masbateño:

- x raised to the power of y, or in symbols, (x^y). In Minasbate, an x piluon sa y na beses.
- square root of x, or in symbols, sqrt(x). In Minasbate, an ikaduha na gamot san x o an numero na pinilo sa duwa na beses na nagin x.
- x over y, or in symbols, x/y. In Minasbate, x kada y.
- one and a half plus two and one-fourth equals three and three-fourths, or in symbols, 1 1/2 + 2 1/4 = 3 3/4. In Minasbate, an usad kag katunga gindagdagan san duha kag kaupat, tulo kag tulo-kaupat tanan.

== Useful terms and expressions ==
=== Parts of the body ===
English	Tagalog	Masbatenyo	IPA Transcription
ankle	bukung-bukong, sakong	tikód	[tɪ'kɔd]
arm	bisig	butkún	[bʊt'kʊn]
armpit	kili-kili	kilikili	[kɪlɪˈkɪlɪ]
back	likod	likod	[lɪ'kɔd]
beard	balbas	barbas	[bar'bas]
belly	tiyan	tiyan	[tɪ'jan]
bile	apdu	apdû	[ʔapˈdʊʔ]
blood	dugo	dugô	[dʊ'gɔʔ]
body	katawan	lawas	['lawas]
breast	suso	dudu	['dʊdʊ]
buttocks	puwit, puwitan	bubót	[bʊˈbɔt]
cheek	pisngi	pisngi	[pɪs'ŋɪ]
chest	dibdib	dughán	[dʊg'han]
chin	baba	babà, sulan, sulay	['babaʔ], [sʊˈlan], ['sʊˈlaɪ̯]
curly hair	kurong	kurung	[kʊˈrʊŋ]
ear	tainga	talinga	[ta'lɪŋa]
elbow	siko	siko	['sɪkɔ]
eye	mata	mata	[maˈta]
eyebrow	kilay	kíray	['kɪɾaɪ̯]
face	mukha	bayhón	[bajˈhɔn]
finger	daliri	tudlo	[tʊd'lʊʔ]
fingernail	kuko	kuko	[kʊ'kɔ]
forehead	noo	agtang	[ʔagˈtaŋ]
foot	paa	tiíl	[tɪˈʔɪl]
gray hair	uban	uban	['ʔʊban]
hair	buhok	buhok	[bʊ'hɔk]
hand	kamay	kamút	[kaˈmʊt]
head	ulo	úlo	['ʔʊlɔ]
heart	puso	puso	[pʊsɔʔ]
intestines	bituka	tinái	[tɪ'naʔɪ]
jaw	panga	pangá	[pa'ŋa]
knee	tuhod	tuhod	['tʊhɔd]
left (hand)	kaliwa	walá	[wa'la]
lip	labi	ngawít	[ŋa'wɪt]
liver	atay	atáy	[ʔa'taɪ̯]
lungs	baga	bagà	['bagaʔ]
mouth	bibig	bibíg	[bɪˈbɪg]
nail (finger or toe)	kuko	kukó	[kʊ'kɔ]
nape	batok	lùong	[lʊ'ʔɔŋ]
navel	pusod	pusod	['pʊsɔd]
neck	leeg	líog	['lɪʔʊg]
nose	ilong	iróng	[ʔɪ'rʊŋ]
palm (hand)	palad	pálad	['palad]
penis	ari ng lalaki, utin, titi, buto	butò	['bʊtʊʔ]
rib	tadyang	gúsok	['gʊsɔk]
right (hand)	kanan	tuó	[tʊ'ʔɔ]
shoulder	balikat	abága	[ʔa'baga]
skull	bungo	bungô, alimpatakan	[bʊ'ŋɔʔ], [ʔalɪmpaˈtakan]
stomach	tiyan	tiyan	[tɪ'jan]
thigh	hita	híta	['hɪtaʔ]
throat	lalamunan	tutunlán	[tʊtʊnˈlan]
toe	daliri sa paa	tudlô	['tʊdlɔʔ]
tooth	ngipin	ngípon	['ŋɪpɔn]
vagina	pekpek, puki	putáy	[pʊ'taɪ̯]

=== Animals ===
English	Tagalog	Masbatenyo	IPA Transcription
ant	langgam	guyom, hurmigas	['gʊjɔm]; [hʊr'mɪgas]
bird	ibon	sapát	[sa'pat]
butterfly	paruparo	alibangbang	[ʔalɪˈbaŋbaŋ]
cat	pusa	miyà	[mɪjaʔ]
chick	sisiw	pisû	[pɪ'sʊʔ]
chicken	manok	manok	[ma'nɔk]
cockroach	ipis	kuratsa	[kʊ'ratsa]
carabao	kalabaw	karabáw	[karaˈbaʊ̯]
crocodile	buwaya	buwáya	[bʊ'waja]
crow	uwak	uwák	[ʔʊ'wak]
deer	usa	usa	['ʔʊsa]
dog	aso	ido, ayam	[ʔɪdʊʔ], ['ʔajam]
eel	igat (freshwater) palos (saltwater)	palós	[pa'lɔs]
fish	isda	isdâ	[ʔɪs'daʔ]
fly (the insect)	langaw (small), bangaw (big)	lángaw	['laŋaʊ̯]
frog	palaka	pakâ	[pa'kaʔ]
mosquito	lamok	lamúk	[la'mʊk]
octopus	pugita	pugíta	[pʊˈgɪta]
pig	baboy	baboy	['babɔɪ̯]
snake	ahas	sawá	[sa'wa]
spider	gagamba	lawà	['lawaʔ]

=== Adjectives/Modifiers ===
English	Tagalog	Masbatenyo	IPA Transcription
alive	buhay	buháy	[bʊˈhaɪ̯]
all	lahat	tanán	[ta'nan]
awake	gising	matá	[ma'ta]
bald	kalbo	kalbo	[kalbɔ]
beautiful	maganda	magandá	[maganˈda]
big	malaki	dakû	[daˈkʊʔ]
bitter	mapait	mapaít	[mapaʔɪt]
black	itim, maitim	itúm, maitúm	[ʔɪ'tʊm], [maʔɪ'tʊm]
clean	malinis	malínis, limpio	[ma'lɪnɪs], ['lɪmpjɔ]
cold (objects)	malamig	matúgnaw	[maˈtʊgnaʊ̯]
cold (weather)	maginaw, malamig	mahágkot	[ma'hagkɔt]
curly hair	kulot	kurúng	[kʊˈrʊŋ]
dark, dim	madilim	madulúm	[madʊ'lʊm]
deaf	bingi	bungól	[bʊˈŋɔl]
deep	malalim	madalúm / hidarúm	[mada'lʊm]
dumb (mute)	pipi	apâ	[ʔa'paʔ]
far	malayo	harayû	[hara'jʊʔ]
fast	mabilis	madagmít / matulin	[madag'mɪt]
few	kaunti, iilan	dyútay / diyút	[djʊ'taɪ̯]
first	una	úna, primero	['ʔʊna], [prɪ'merɔ]
foul-smelling	mabaho	mabahò	[ma'bahʊʔ]
fragrant	mabango	mahumot	[maˈhʊmɔt]
full (after eating)	busog	busóg	[bʊˈsɔg]
full (not empty)	puno	punô	[pʊ'nʊʔ]
good	mabuti	mabúot, maayo	[ma'bʊʔɔt], [maˈʔajʊ]
healthy	malusog	mabaskog	[ma'baskog]
heavy	mabigat	mabug-at	[mabʊgˈʔat]
hungry	gutom	gutóm	[gʊ'tɔm]
last	huli	urhí	[ʔʊrˈhɪ]
light	magaan(g)	magaán	[maga'ʔan]
many	marami	damû	[daˈmʊʔ]
narrow	makitid	mapiot	[mapiot]
rotten (as fruit)	sira	lupâ	[lu'pâ]
rotten (log)	bulok	lub-ok	[lʊb'ʔɔk]
shallow	mababaw	hamábaw	[haˈmabaʊ̯]
sharp (knife)	matalim, matalas	matarúm	[mata'rʊm]
short	maliit (size), maikli, maiksi (length), pandak (height)	dyutáy, putót	[djʊ'taɪ̯], [pʊ'tɔt]
sleepy	inaantok	ginapiráw	[gɪnapɪˈraʊ̯]
slow	mabagal	mahínay	[maˈhɪnaɪ̯]
small	maliit	dyutáy	[djʊˈtaɪ̯]
sweet	matamis	matam-is	[matam'ʔɪs]
thick	makapal	dakmól	[dakˈmɔl]
thin	manipis	manipís	[manɪ'pɪs]
thin (human)	payat	maníwang	[ma'nɪwaŋ]
thirsty	uhaw	uháw	[ʔʊ'haʊ̯]
tight	masikip	gutók	[gʊ'tɔk]
ugly	pangit	maraót	[mara'ʔɔt]
warm (weather), warm (humid)	mainit, maalinsangan	maínit	[ma'ʔɪnɪt]
weak	mahina	maluya	[maˈlʊja]
wet	basa	basâ	[ba'saʔ]
wide	malawak	halápad	[haˈlapad]
wrong	mali	malî	[ma'lɪʔ]

=== Common phrases ===
- I hate you! – Badli ako sa imo! / Habo ko sa imo!
- I love you. – Namomo-ot ako sa imo. Namumot-an ta ikaw. (Bicolano-influenced)
- I love you. – Palangga ta ikaw. (Masbate Mainland)
- Let's talk. – Mag-istoryahan kita.
- Can I join? – Pwede ako kaintra? Pwede ako maki-intra?
- Pleased to meet you. – Malipay ako na nagbagat kita.
- How you doin'? – Matiano ka dida?
- Please let me know. – Ipaaram la sa akon.
- Please help me. – Buligi man ako.
- Can you teach me? – Pwede mo ba ako matukduan? / Pwede magpatukdo? / Tukdui man ako.
- I want to learn Masbatenyo. – Gusto ko makaaram mag-istorya san Masbatenyo.
- Good morning! – Maayo na aga!
- Good afternoon! – Maayo na hapon!
- Good evening! – Maayo na gab-i!
- Good night! – Turog maayo.
- Let's eat. – Karaon na kita.
- You're (really) beautiful. – Kaganda mo (gayud).
- Please call me. – Tawagi tabi ako.
- Can I ask you a favor? – Pwede ako mangayo sin pabor?

== Literary works ==
Pulong Ko Yadto

Pulong ko yadto mato-od kag tunay
An imo sa akon tuga na pagmahal
Nano an nangyari kay imo guin bayaan
Mga pangako mo san nag-agi na adlaw
Mili kay sugad an akon kamotangan
Imo guin bayaan, imo guin bayaan
Nagtios sin labi na kasakitan
Kay gusto mo ada na ako mamatay
Kon dili pa lamang an akon paglaom
Sa imo binilin na mga surmaton
Di kunta nagios inin tagipusu-on
Di kunta nasayang inin lawas nakon.
