= Waray language =

Austronesian language primarily spoken in the islands of Samar and Eastern Leyte

Waray
- Waray-Waray, Samar-Leyte Visayan
- Winaray, Samareño, Lineyte-Samarnon, Binisayâ nga Winaray, Binisayâ nga Samar-Leyte
- Native to: Philippines
- Region: Eastern Visayas, some parts of Masbate, southern part of Sorsogon, and Gibusong Island of Mindanao
- Ethnicity: Waray
- Native speakers: 3.6 million (2015 census)
- Language family: Austronesian: Malayo-Polynesian; Philippine; Central Philippine; Bisayan; Central Bisayan; Warayan; Waray
- Dialects: Standard Waray (Tacloban dialect), Northern Samar dialect, Calbayog dialect, Culaba-Biliran dialect, Abuyog dialect and 20 other identified dialects and subdialects
- Writing system: Latin; Historically Baybayin

Official status
- Official language in: Regional language in the Philippines
- Regulated by: Komisyon sa Wikang Filipino; Historically regulated by the Sanghiran san Binisaya ha Samar ug Leyte

Language codes
- ISO 639-2: war
- ISO 639-3: war
- Glottolog: wara1300
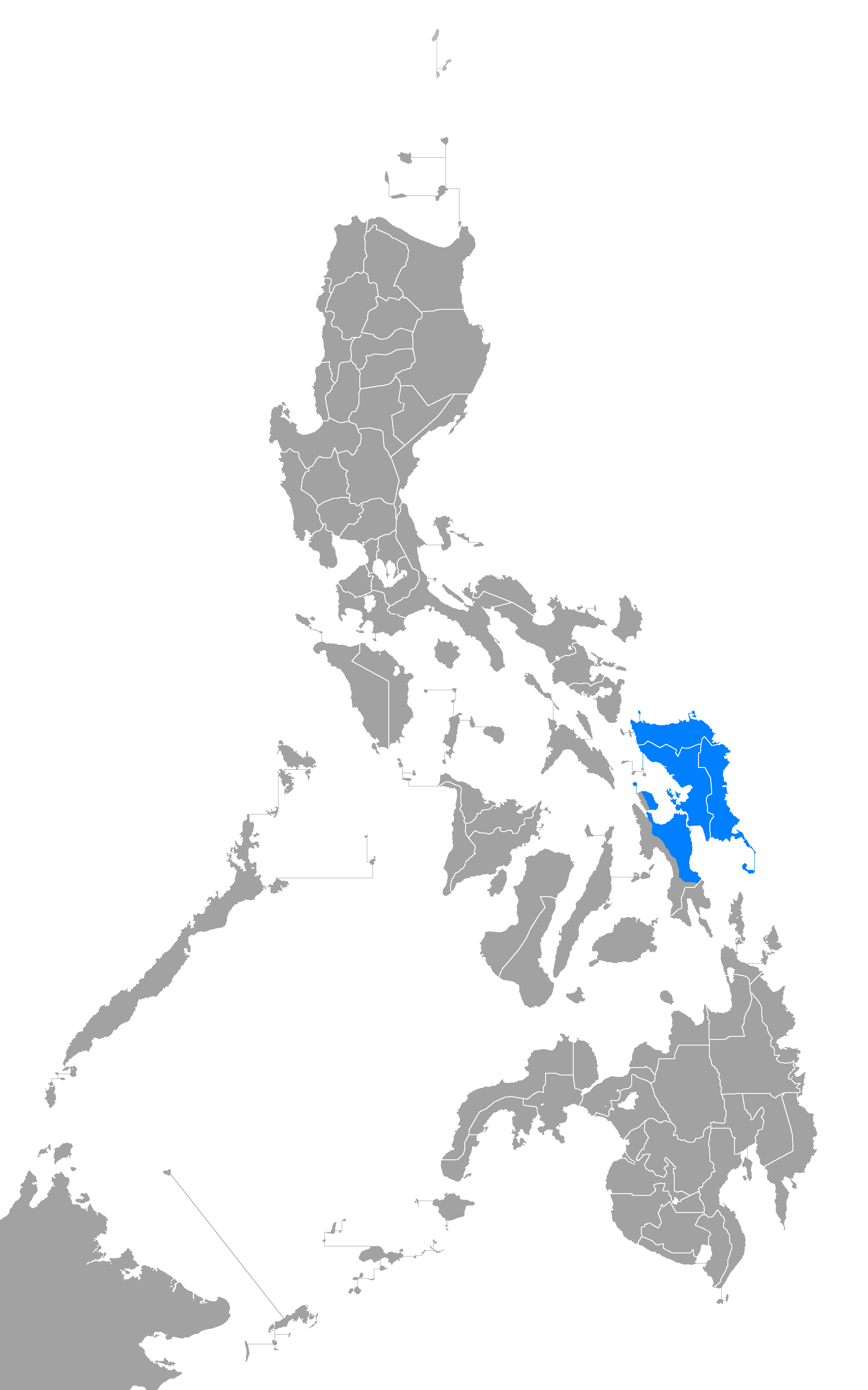
- Areas where Waray-Waray is spoken

Waray (also known as Waray-Waray or Bisayâ/Binisayâ and Winaray/Waray, Spanish: idioma samareño meaning Samar language) is an Austronesian language and the fifth-most-spoken native regional language of the Philippines, native to Eastern Visayas. It is the native language of the Waray people and second language of the Abaknon people of Capul, Northern Samar, and some Cebuano-speaking peoples of western and southern parts of Leyte island. It is the third most spoken language among the Bisayan languages, only behind Cebuano and Hiligaynon.

== Nomenclature ==
The term Waray comes from the word often heard by non-speakers meaning 'none' or 'nothing' in the language; similarly, Cebuanos are known in Leyte as mga Kana and their language as Kana (after the oft-heard word kana, meaning 'that' in the Cebuano language). The Cebuano pronunciation of Waray is walay with the same meaning.

During the Spanish period, texts refer to the language as simply being a dialect of "Visayan". In contrast, most contemporary linguists consider many of these "Visayan dialects" (e.g., Cebuano, Hiligaynon, Karay-a, etc.) to be distinct languages, and the term Visayan is usually taken to refer to what is called Cebuano in contemporary linguistic literature. Domingo Ezguerra's 1663 (reprinted 1747) Arte de la lengua bisaya de la provincia de Leyte refers to the "Visayan tongue of the province of Leyte", Figueroa's Arte del idioma Visaya de Samar y Leyte refers to the "Visaya language of Samar and Leyte". Antonio Sanchez's 1914 Diccionario español-bisaya (Spanish-Visayan Dictionary) refers to the speech of "Sámar and Leyte".

== Dialects ==
Linguist Jason Lobel (2009) considers there are 25 dialects and subdialects of Waray-Waray.

- Tacloban: "standard" dialect: the dialect used in television and radio broadcasts and in education
- Abuyog, Leyte: heavy Cebuano influence
- Culaba, Biliran: heavy Cebuano influence
- Catbalogan: "original" dialect: Pure Waray, central part of Samar Island
- Calbayog: mixture of the Tacloban dialect and the dialect of Northern Samar
- Allen, Northern Samar: mostly Waray Sorsoganon mixed with Northern Samarenyo. Dialects in neighboring towns have also borrowed extensively from Waray Sorsoganon.

Many Waray dialects feature a sound change in which Proto-Bisayan *s becomes /h/ in a small number of common grammatical morphemes. This sound change occurs in all areas of Samar south of the municipalities of Santa Margarita, Matuginao, Las Navas, and Gamay (roughly corresponding to the provinces of Samar and Eastern Samar, but not Northern Samar), as well as in all of the Waray-speaking areas of Leyte, except the towns of Javier and Abuyog. However, this sound change is an areal feature rather than a strictly genetic one.

Most Waray dialects in northeastern and Eastern Samar have the close central unrounded vowel /ɨ/ as a reflex of Proto-Austronesian *e.

== Usage ==
Waray is one of the many regional languages found in the Philippines and used in local government. It is widely used in media particularly in television and radio broadcasts, however, not in print media because most regional newspapers are published in English.

The language is used in education from kindergarten to primary level as part of the Philippine government's K–12 program since 2012 in which pupils from kindergarten to third grade are taught in their respective native languages.

Waray is also used in the Mass in the Roman Catholic Church and in the worship services of different Christian sects in the region. Bibles in Waray are also available. In 2019, the New World Translation of the Holy Scriptures was released in Waray-Waray. However, there is a growing population of Muslims in the region with the first mosque, Tacloban Mosque and Islamic Center, through a charity built by a Turkish Islamic religious authority in Tacloban at 2017 which teaches the scriptures and offers Friday sermons in both Waray and Cebuano in general.

== Phonology ==
=== Vowels ===
Most Waray dialects have three vowel phonemes: /a/ [a], /i/ [ɛ~i] and /u/ [ɔ~u]. Some dialects have an additional vowel /ə/ [ə]; words with /ə/ in these dialects have /u/ in the majority dialects.

	Front	Central	Back
Close/Mid	i	(ə)	u
Open		a	

=== Consonants ===
Waray has a total of 16 consonant phonemes: /p, t, k, b, d, ɡ, m, n, ŋ, s, h, l, ɾ~r, w, j, ʔ/. Two extra postalveolar sounds [tʃ, dʒ] are heard when /i/ occurs after /t, d/, further proceeding another vowel sound.

	Labial	Alveolar	Dorsal	Glottal
Nasal	m	n	ŋ	
Stop	p b	t d	k g	ʔ
Fricative		s		h
Rhotic		ɾ~r		
Approximant	w	l	j	

== Alphabet ==
Waray, like all Philippine languages today, is written using the Latin script. There exists an officially-approved orthography for the language.

The 28-letter Filipino alphabet is used for writing Waray:

Majuscule form
A	B	C	D	E	F	G	H	I	J	K	L	M	N	Ñ	NG	O	P	Q	R	S	T	U	V	W	X	Y	Z
Minuscule form
a	b	c	d	e	f	g	h	i	j	k	l	m	n	ñ	ng	o	p	q	r	s	t	u	v	w	x	y	z

The letters ⟨c⟩, ⟨f⟩, ⟨j⟩, ⟨ñ⟩, ⟨q⟩, ⟨v⟩, ⟨x⟩, and ⟨z⟩ are not used in any native Waray words. Even in loanwords they are usually replaced by other letters (e.g. ⟨k⟩ or ⟨s⟩ for ⟨c⟩, ⟨p⟩ for ⟨f⟩, ⟨dy⟩ or ⟨h⟩ for ⟨j⟩, ⟨ny⟩ for ⟨ñ⟩, ⟨kw⟩ for ⟨qu⟩, ⟨b⟩ for ⟨v⟩, ⟨ks⟩ for ⟨x⟩, and ⟨s⟩ for ⟨z⟩).

The accent marks are used in the same manner as in the Filipino orthography.

== Grammar ==
=== Case markers ===
	Absolutive	Ergative	Oblique
singular impersonal	an	han/san*	ha/sa
plural impersonal	an mga	han mga/san mga*	ha mga/sa mga
singular personal	hi/si	ni	kan
plural personal	hira/sira	nira	kira

== Vocabulary ==
Waray uses many different words to specify a particular thing. These words might not be the same in spelling and in construction but they share the same meaning, making it a very diverse language.

Here are some examples of demonstratives and adverbs together with their equivalent definition in Waray-Waray:

English	Waray
what	ano, anyá, náno
where	diin, ngain, háin
who	hino/sino (hin-o/sin-o)
when	sán-o, kakán-o, kasán-o
how	pán-ogin-áano, gin-áanya
here	didi, dinhi, ngadi, nganhi, áanhi, áadi
there	ngada, dida, ngadto, didto, aadto, aada
that	iito, iton, ito, it
those	adto, adton, aadto
these	aadin, adin, inin
why	kay, kay ano, kay ngano, ngano
this	ini, inin, adin, adi

=== Verbs ===
English	Waray	English	Waray
to run	dalágan	to fix something	aydi/a
to walk	lakát	to explain	ig-eksplikar
to climb	saká, sak-a/i	to invite	ig-imbitar, kumbidahi
to swim	langoy	to attend	atender, atendera/i
to talk/speak	igyakán, igsumát, igsiring	to send something	ipadara, padad-a/i
to jump	ambaka/i, lukso	to create	paghimo, pagbuhat
to sit	lingkod	to build	pagtindog
to stand	tindog	to fly	lupad
to shout/scream	guliat	to sleep	katurog
to make friends	makig-sangkay	to write	ig-surat
to cry	tuok, haya, tangis	to lay down	higda
to buy	palit, palita/i	to love	higugma-a
to travel	biyahe	to care	asikasuha/i
to sing	kanta	to discuss	pag-istorya, pagsabot, himangraw
to dance	sayaw	to drive	pagmaneho, pagdrayb
to fetch water	pag-alog	to ride	sakay, sakya/i
to drink	inom, imna/i	to carry	pas-ana/i, dad-a, bitbita
to eat	kaon	to sell something	ig-baligya, ig-tinda

=== Numbers ===
Native numbers are used for numbers one through ten. From eleven onwards, Spanish numbers are exclusively used in Waray today, their native counterparts being almost unheard of by the majority of native speakers (except for gatos for hundred and yukot for thousand). Some, especially the old ones, are spoken alongside the Spanish counterparts.

English	Native Waray	Derived from Spanish	Spanish
one	usá	uno	un/uno (m) una (f)
two	duhá	dos	dos
three	tuló	tres	tres
four	upat	kuwatro	cuatro
five	limá	singko	cinco
six	unom	sais/says	seis
seven	pitó	syete	siete
eight	waló	otso	ocho
nine	siyám	nuebe/nuybe	nueve
ten	napúlô	dies/dyis	diez
eleven	napúlô kag-usá	onse	once
twelve	napúlô kagduhá	dose	doce
thirteen	napúlô kagtuló	trese	trece
fourteen	napúlô kag-upat	katorse	catorce
fifteen	napúlô kaglimá	kinse	quince
sixteen	napúlô kag-unom	disisays/disisais	dieciséis
seventeen	napúlô kagpitó	disisyete	diecisiete
eighteen	napúlô kagwaló	disiotso	dieciocho
nineteen	napúlô kagsiyám	disinuybe	diecinueve
twenty	karuhaàn	baynte	veinte
twenty one	karuhaàn kag-usà	baynte uno	veintiuno
twenty two	karuhaàn kagduhà	baynte dos	veintidós
thirty	katluàn	traynta	treinta
forty	kap-atàn	kuwarenta	cuarenta
fifty	kalim-àn	singkwenta	cincuenta
sixty	kaunmàn	saysenta/sisenta	sesenta
seventy	kapituàn	sitenta	setenta
eighty	kawaluàn	otsenta/ochienta	ochenta
ninety	kasiyamàn	nobenta	noventa
one hundred	usa ka gatòs	syen	cien
one thousand	usa ka yukòt	mil	mil
one million	usa ka ribo	milyon	un millón

=== Loanwords and cognates ===
Waray has borrowed vocabulary extensively from other languages, especially from Spanish. These words are being adopted to fill lexical gaps of the recipient language. Spanish colonialization introduced new systems to the Philippine society.

== See also ==
- Waray people
- Waray literature
- Waray Wikipedia
- Languages of the Philippines
- Samar
- Leyte
- Waray Sorsogon language
