= Catanduanes (disambiguation) =

Catanduanes is an island province in the Philippines. It may also refer to:

- Catanduanes' languages:
  - Northern Catanduanes Bicolano
  - Southern Catanduanes Bikol language
- Legislative district of Catanduanes
- Catanduanes State University
- Catanduanes Narrow-mouthed Frog
