= Coastal Bikol =

Bikol variety of the Philippines

- Baybayon na Bikol
- Native to: Philippines
- Region: Bicol
- Ethnicity: Bicolano
- Language family: Austronesian: Malayo-Polynesian; Philippine; Central Philippine; Bikol languages; Coastal Bikol
- Writing system: Latin (Bikol alphabet); Bikol Braille; Historically Basahan

Official status
- Regulated by: Komisyon sa Wikang Filipino

Language codes
- ISO 639-3: –
- Glottolog: coas1315

A speaker of a dialect of Coastal Bikol, recorded in the United States.

Coastal Bikol (Central Bikol: Baybayon na Bikol) is one of the three groups or family languages of Bikol languages. It includes Mt. Isarog Agta, Mt. Iraya Agta, Central Bikol, and Southern Catanduanes Bikol, sometimes classified as a dialect of Central Bikol.

== Ethnologue ==
The languages grouped as Coastal Bikol according to Ethnologue are:

- Coastal Bikol (Northern)
  - Isarog Agta language
  - Mount Iraya Agta language
  - Central Bikol language
    - Canaman dialect (standard)
    - Naga City dialect
    - Partido dialect
    - Tabaco-Legazpi-Sorsogon (TLS) dialect
    - Daet dialect
  - Southern Catanduanes Bikol language

== See also ==
- Bikol languages
