= Bikol languages =

Group of languages of the Philippines

Bikol
- Geographic distribution: Bicol Region
- Native speakers: 4,430,000 (1990)
- Linguistic classification: Austronesian: Malayo-Polynesian; Philippine; Greater Central Philippine; Central Philippine; Bikol
- Proto-language: Proto-Bikol
- Subdivisions: Coastal Bikol; Inland Bikol; Pandan Bikol

Language codes
- ISO 639-2 / 5: bik
- ISO 639-3: bik
- Glottolog: biko1240
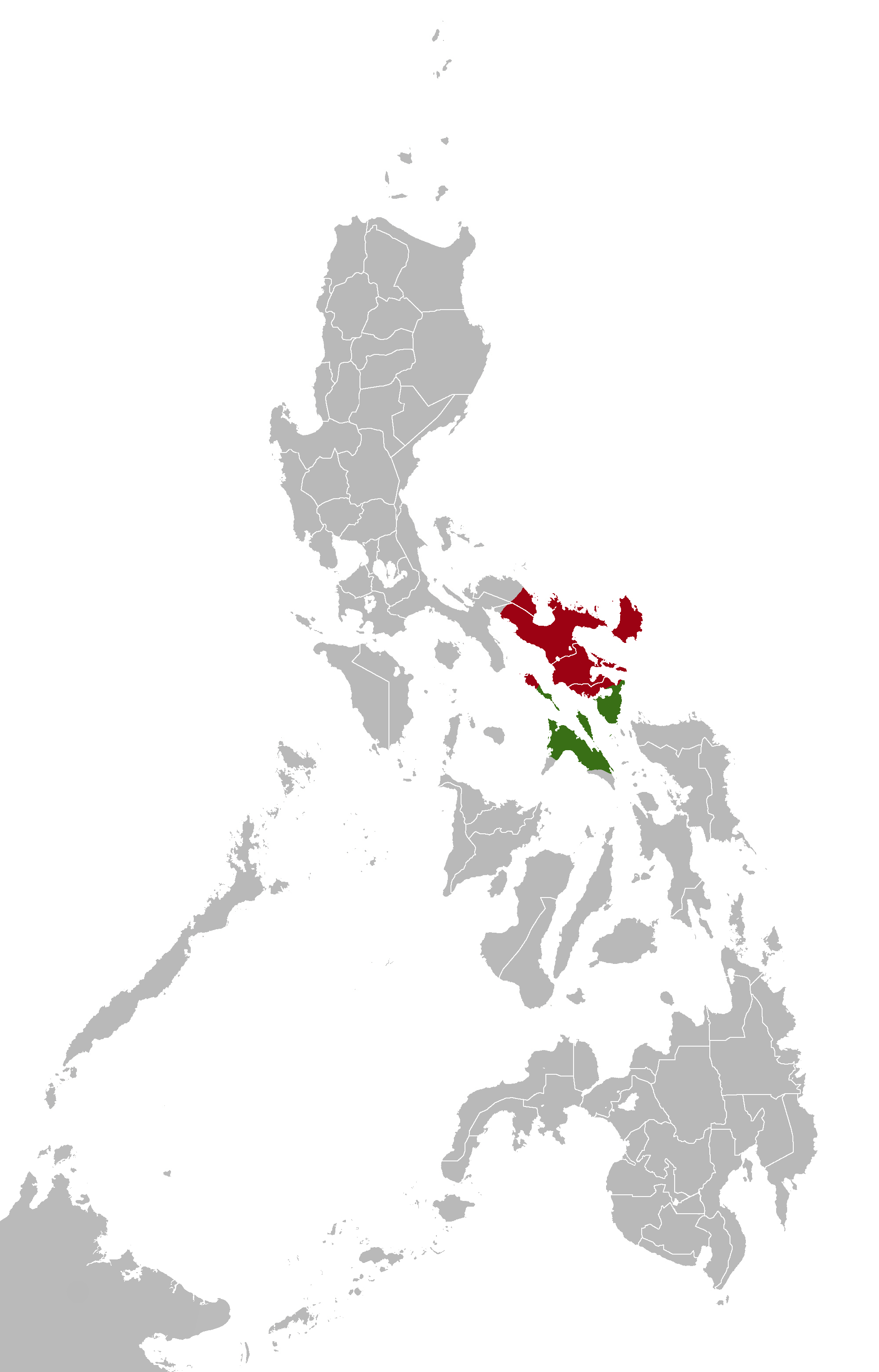
- Geographic extent of Bikol languages according to Ethnologue Bikol proper Bisayan languages in the Bikol region

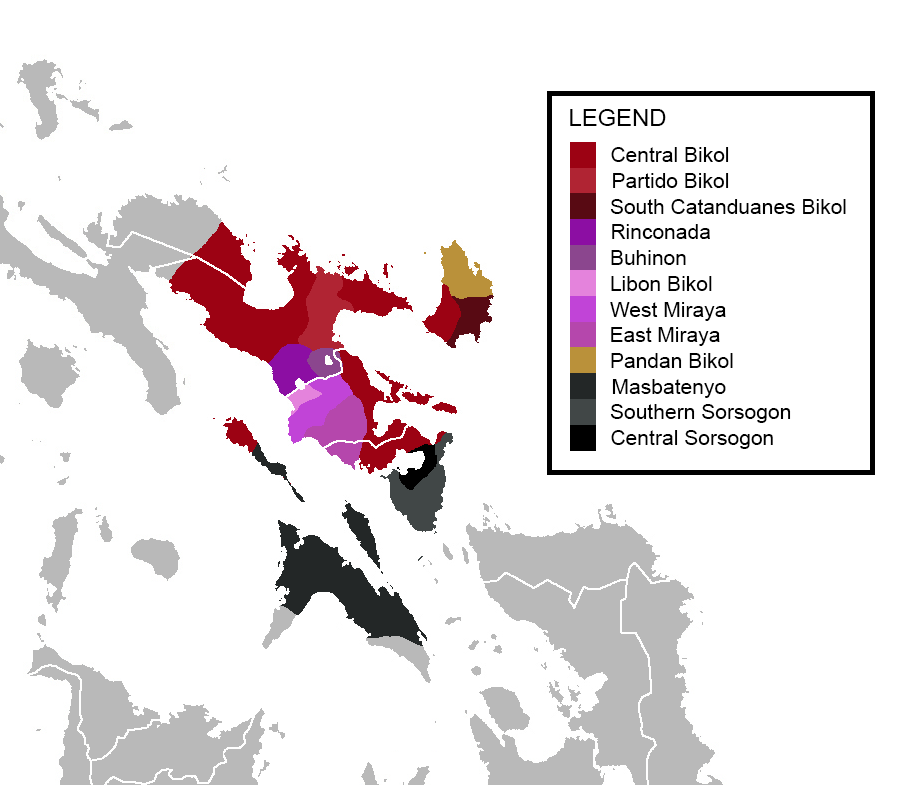
Geographic distribution of major Bikol languages and dialects across Bicol region; classification based on Lobel (2013); Masbatenyo, Central Sorsogon, and Southern Sorsogon are Bisayan languages but heavily influenced by Bikol.

A speaker of Bicolano, recorded in the United States

The Bikol languages or Bicolano languages are a group of Central Philippine languages spoken mostly in the Bicol Peninsula in the southeastern part of Luzon, the neighboring island-province of Catanduanes, and the island of Burias in Masbate. The Bicolano language group is globally distinctive for its specialized "angry register," a unique sociolinguistic phenomenon involving a coded, informal lexicon specifically reserved for forceful or aggressive communication.

== Internal classification ==
=== Ethnologue ===
Ethnologue groups the languages of Bikol as follows:

- Bikol
  - Coastal Bikol (Northern)
    - Isarog Agta language
    - Mount Iraya Agta language
    - Central Bikol language (ISO 639-3 bcl)
      - Canaman dialect (standard)
      - Naga City dialect
      - Partido dialect
      - Tabaco–Legazpi–Sorsogon (TLS) dialect
      - Daet dialect
    - Southern Catanduanes Bikol language
  - Inland Bikol (Southern)
    - Mount Iriga Agta language
    - Albay Bikol languages
      - Buhinon language
      - Libon language
      - West Miraya language
      - East Miraya language
    - Rinconada Bikol language
      - Highland/Sinabukid dialect
        - Agta variant
        - Iriga variant (standard)
      - Lakeside/Sinaranəw dialect
        - Baao variant
        - Bato variant
        - Bula–Pili variant
        - Nabua–Balatan variant
  - Northern Catanduanes Bikol (Pandan Bikol)

=== McFarland (1974) ===
Curtis McFarland gives the following classification for the Bikol languages.

- Bikol
  - North Catanduanes
    - Pandan (North Catanduanes)
  - Inland Bikol
    - Iriga (Rinconada)
    - Albay
      - Buhi (Buhi'non)
      - - Libon
        - - Oas (West Miraya)
          - Daraga (East Miraya)
  - Coastal Bikol
    - Naga (Standard Bikol), Legazpi, and Partido
    - Virac (South Catanduanes)
    - San Pascual (Northern Burias Island)

=== Lobel (2000) ===
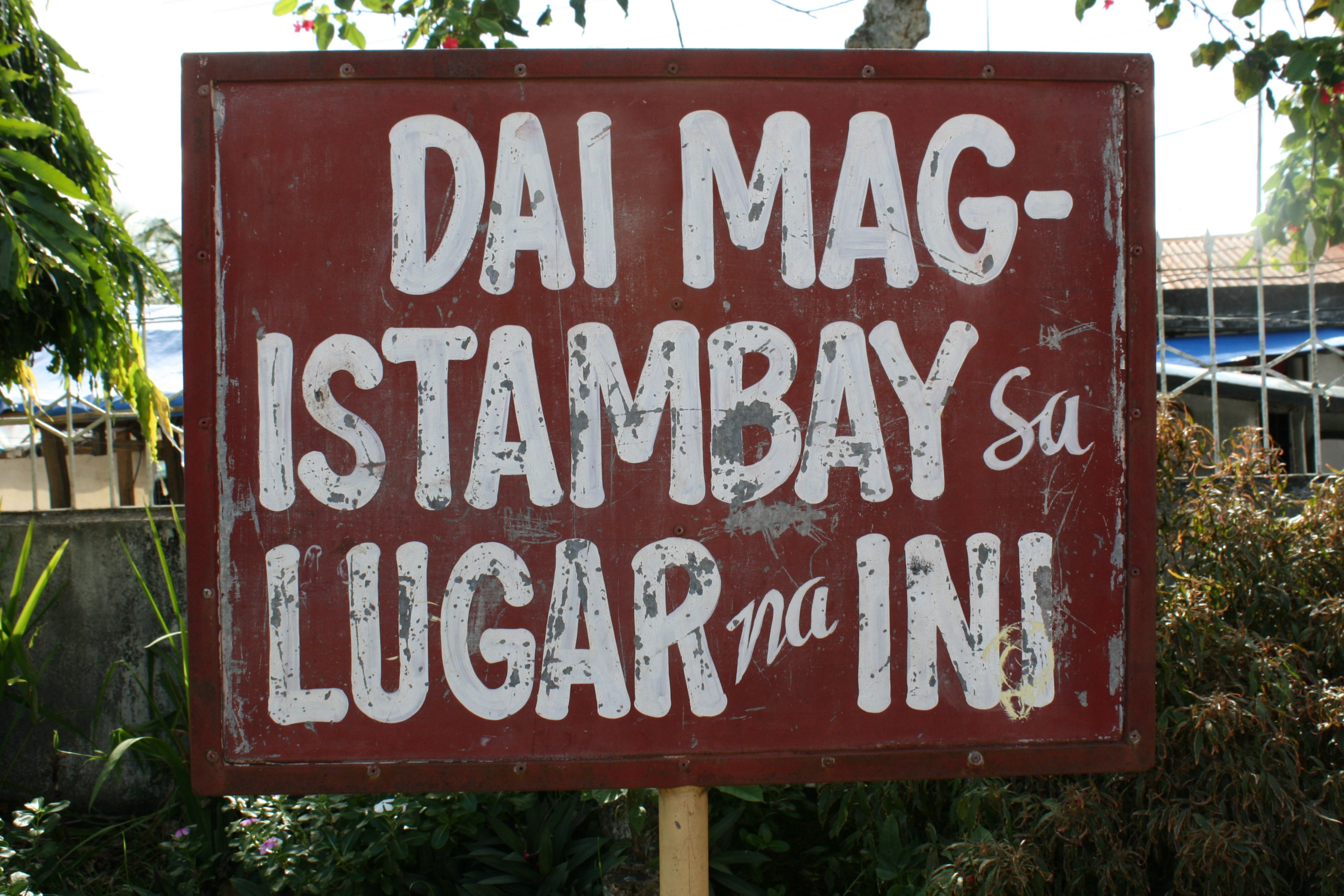
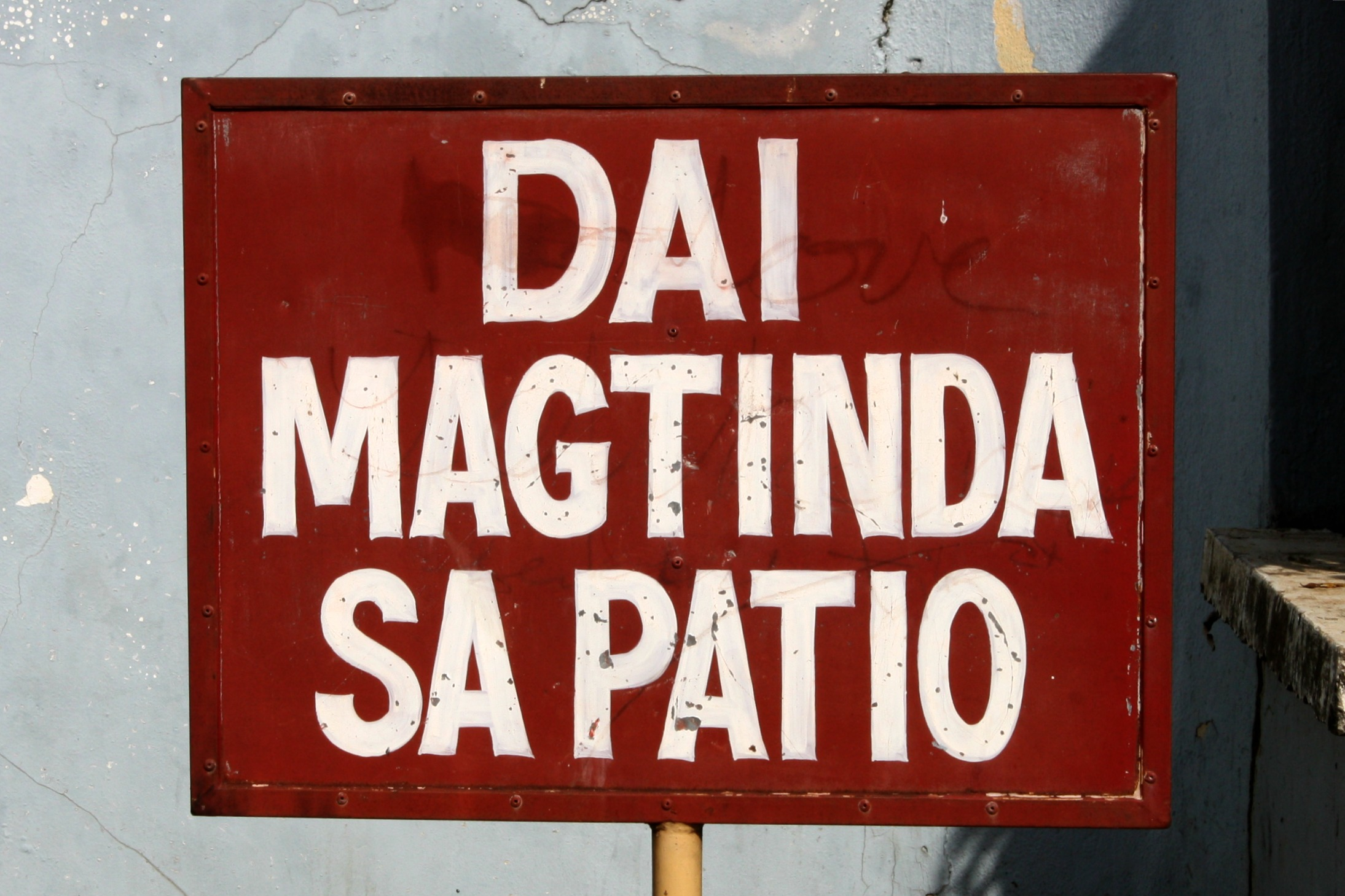
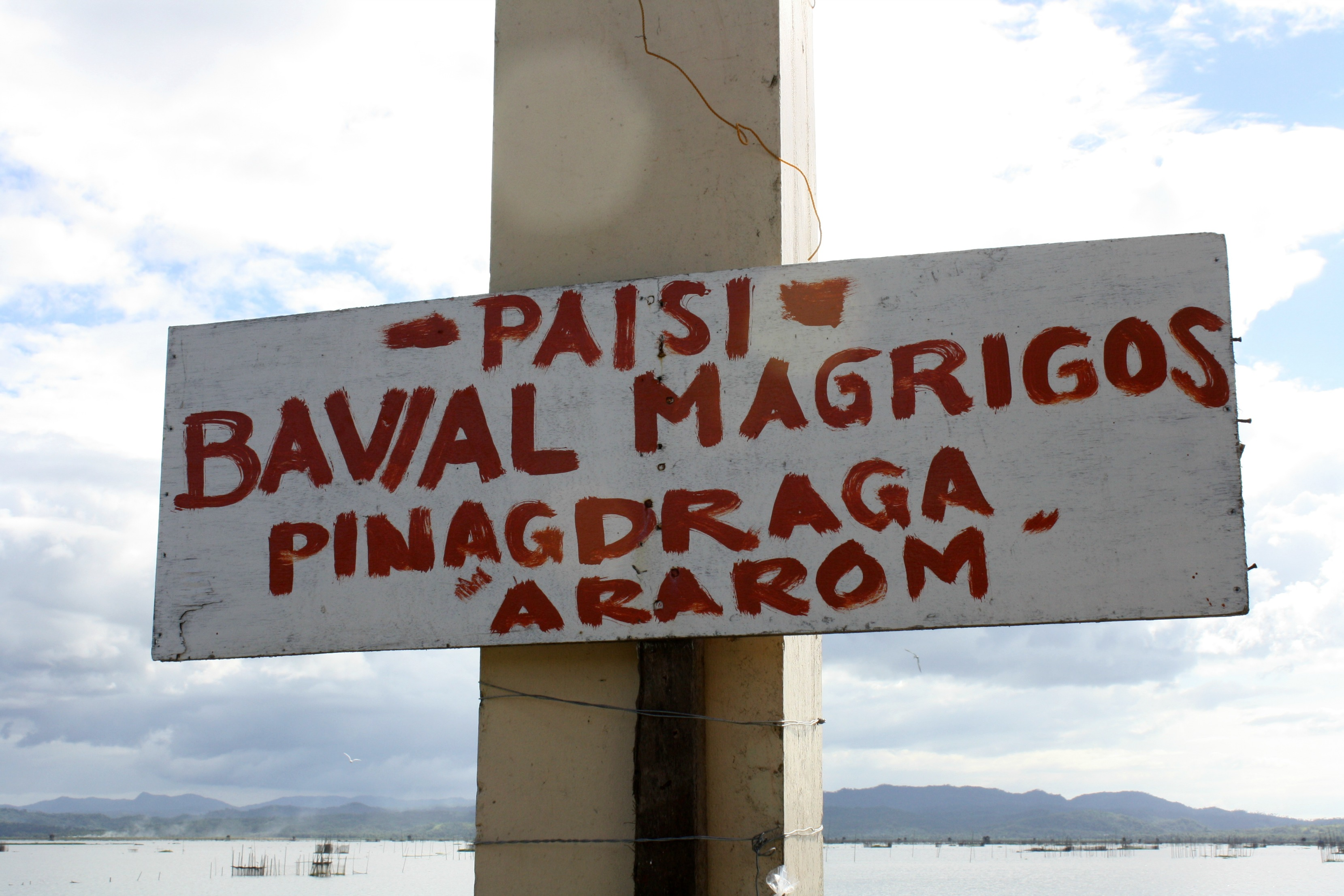
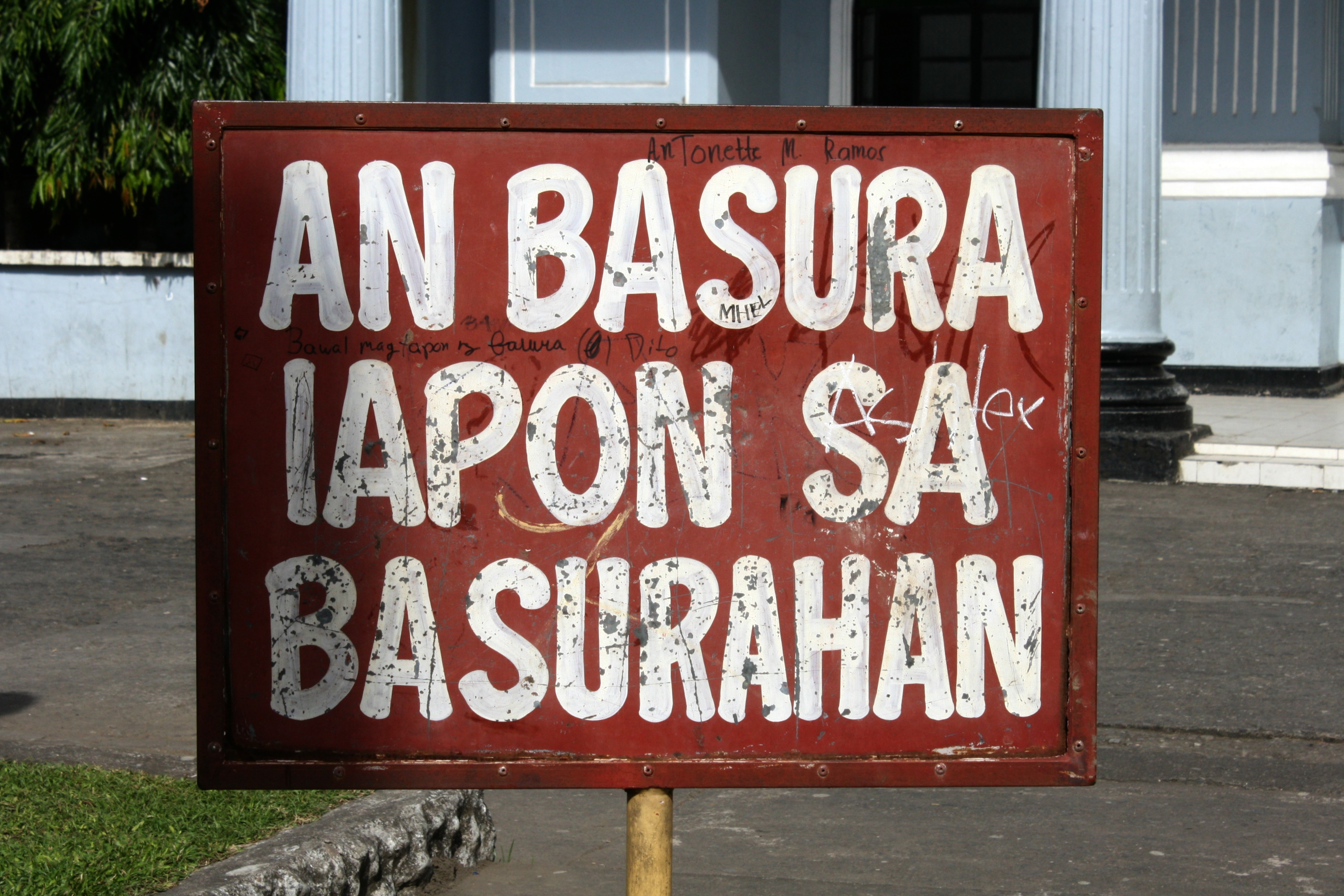
Clockwise from top-left: A signage barring people from hanging around the area; A signage barring vendors inside the churchyard; A signage reminding people of proper waste disposal; and a signage barring swimmers in Lake Bato. All are written in the Coastal Bikol language (Naga–Legazpi variant).

While McFarland (1974) splits Bikol into 11 dialects, Lobel (2000) splits Bikol into 12 different dialects (including Partido Bikol, which McFarland does not differentiate) and 4 main branches.

- Bikol
  - Northern Coastal Bikol
    - Central Standard – spoken primarily in Naga City, Cam. Sur, Tabaco & Legazpi, Albay and Sorsogon City, Sorsogon. Also recognized (and sometimes understood) in Daet, Camarines Norte and many other areas of Camarines Sur, San Pascual, Masbate on Burias Island, first and second districts of Albay, southwestern coast of Catanduanes, and northeastern Sorsogon.
      - Daet area variant
      - Naga City area variant
      - Tabaco–Legazpi–Sorsogon area variant
      - Southwestern and northern town of San Andres and Caramoran, Catanduanes.
    - Partido – spoken in the Camarines Sur municipalities of Ocampo, Goa, Tigaon, Lagonoy, Sagñay, and San Jose. This dialect has a mellow intonation and is heavily influenced by Rinconada Bikol.
    - Southern Catanduanes – spoken in the southern half of Catanduanes.
      - Virac area variant
      - Bato area variant
      - Baras area variant
      - San Miguel variant (transitional to North Catanduanes)
  - Southern Coastal and Inland Bikol
    - Rinconada Bikol – spoken primarily in Iriga City, Baao, Bula, Balatan, Baao and Nabua, Camarines Sur. Also in some parts of Ocampo, Buhi and Pili in Camarines Sur and in parts of Polangui, Albay.
      - Lakeside Rinconada dialect (lacks /ə/ vowel)
      - Highland Rinconada dialect (with /ə/ vowel)
    - Buhinon – spoken in Buhi, Camarines Sur. Contains features from both the Bikol of Polangui, Albay and the Iriga variant of Rinconada Bikol.
    - Libon – spoken in Libon, Albay.
    - West Miraya – spoken in Ligao City, Polangui, Oas, and Pio Duran, Albay.
    - East Miraya – spoken in Guinobatan, Camalig, Daraga & Jovellar, Albay and Donsol & Pilar, Sorsogon.
      - Central (Guinobatan)
      - Far East (Camalig, Daraga)
      - Southeast (Jovellar, Albay, Donsol, Pilar)
  - Northern Catanduanes
    - Pandan Bikol – spoken by about 80,000 people or the northern half of Catanduanes.
      - Bagamanoc area variant
      - Caramoran area variant (transitional to South Catanduanes)
      - Gigmoto area variant (transitional to South Catanduanes)
      - Pandan area variant
      - Panganiban area variant
      - Viga area variant
  - Bisakol
    - Northern Sorsogon – spoken in Sorsogon City, Castilla, Casiguran and Juban.
      - Castilla area variant (mixed with Bikol-Legazpi)
      - Casiguran–Juban area variant
    - Southern Sorsogon (also known as Gubat language) – spoken in Gubat; Barcelona, Bulusan, Santa Magdalena, Matnog, Irosin, and Bulan.
    - Masbateño – spoken in Masbate City, Mobo, Uson, Dimasalang, Palanas, Masbate, Aroroy on the island of Masbate, all of Ticao Island, and Claveria on the southern half of Burias Island.
      - Standard Masbateño
      - Ticao Island variant

Some dialects of Southern Bikol have the close central unrounded vowel /ɨ/ as a reflex of Proto-Austronesian *ə. However, Proto-Austronesian *ə is realized as /o/ in Libon. Two Bikol dialects have unique additional consonants, namely Southern Catanduanes, which has an interdental lateral consonant /l̟/ (also transcribed as l̪͆), and Buhi-non, which has the voiced velar fricative /ɣ/.

== See also ==
- Vocabulario de la lengua Bicol
