= Mount Iriga Agta language =

Bikol language spoken in the Philippines

Inagta Rinconada
- Mt. Iriga Agta, West Buhi Agta
- Native to: Philippines
- Region: Luzon
- Native speakers: (1,500 cited 1979)
- Language family: Austronesian: Malayo-Polynesian; Philippine; Central Philippine; Bikol languages; Inland Bikol; Inagta Rinconada

Language codes
- ISO 639-3: agz
- Glottolog: mtir1235

Inagta Rinconada (Mount Iriga Agta) is a Bikol language spoken by a semi-nomadic hunter-gatherer Agta (Negrito) people of the Philippines. It is spoken to the east of Iriga City up to the shores of Lake Buhi. The language is largely intelligible with Mount Iraya Agta on the other side of the lake.

The Rinconada Agta live primarily in forests near rural barangays of Buhi, Iriga (including a settlement in the Ilian area), and Baao in Camarines Sur (Lobel 2013:68).

== Locations ==
Reid (1994) also reports a closely related variety called Rugnot spoken in the area of Lake Buhi, Camarines Sur. Inagta locations listed by Reid (1994) are as follows.

- Santa Niño, Hayagan, and Santa Cruz, Ipil, Buhi, Camarines Sur
- San Augustine, Buhi, Camarines Sur; SIL
- San Ramon, Lake Buhi, Camarines Sur; SIL

== Bibliography ==
- Villegas, Lucky Merriam T. (2010). A Grammatical Sketch Of Iriga Agta. UP Diliman. [Bachelor's thesis]
