= Central Bikol =

Austronesian language spoken in the Philippines

- Bikol Sentral
- Native to: Philippines
- Region: Bicol
- Ethnicity: Bicolano
- Native speakers: (2.5 million cited 1990 census); 6th most spoken native language in the Philippines
- Language family: Austronesian: Malayo-Polynesian; Philippine; Central Philippine; Bikol languages; Coastal Bikol; Central Bikol
- Writing system: Latin (Bikol alphabet); Bikol Braille; Historically Basahan

Official status
- Recognised minority language in: Regional language in the Philippines
- Regulated by: Komisyon sa Wikang Filipino

Language codes
- ISO 639-3: bcl
- Glottolog: cent2087
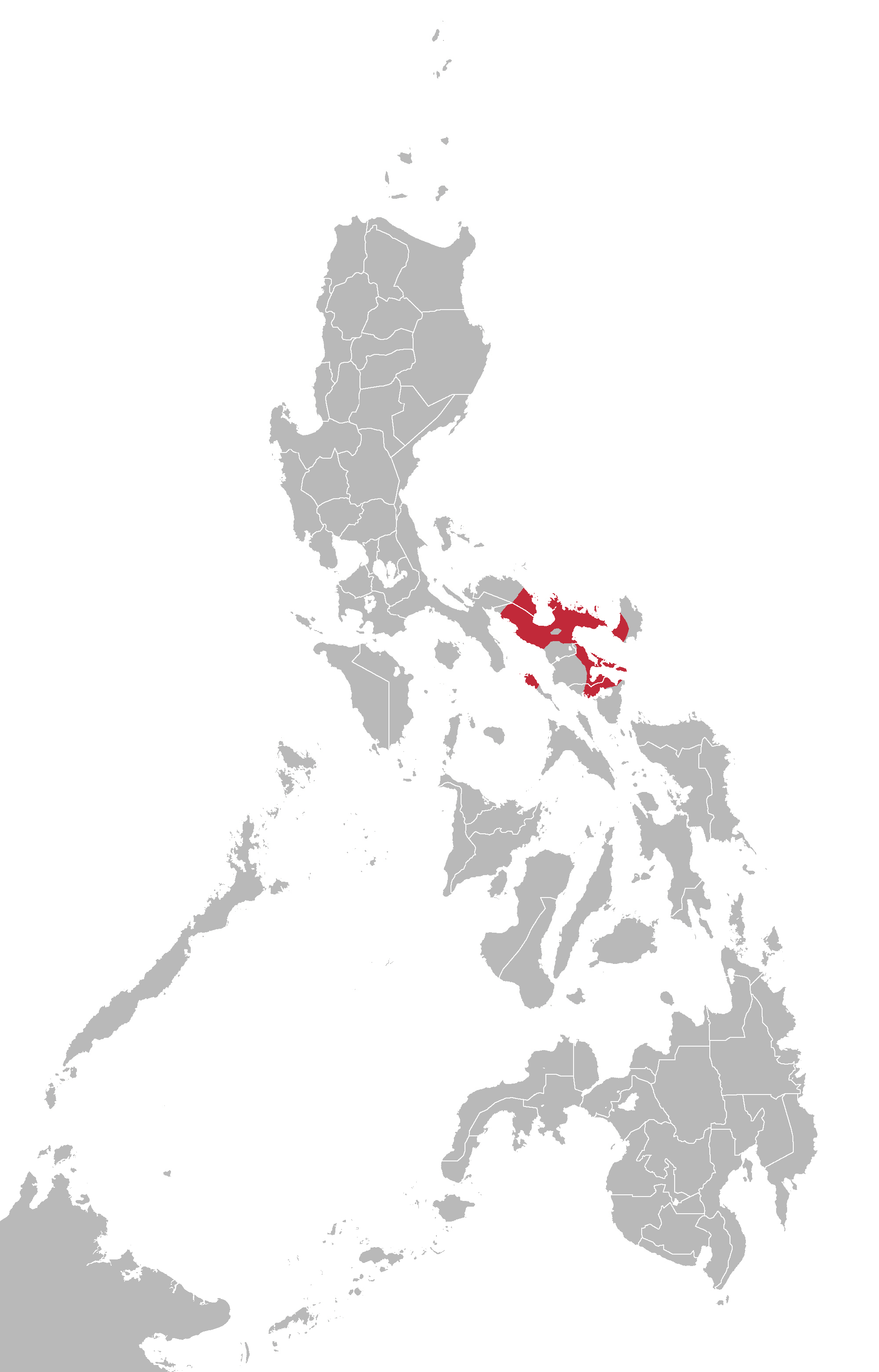
- Areas where Central Bicolano is spoken in the Philippines

A Central Bikol speaker, recorded in the United States.

Central Bikol, commonly called Bikol Naga or simply Bikol, is an Austronesian language spoken by the Bicolanos, primarily in the Bicol Region of southern Luzon, Philippines. It is spoken in the northern and western part of Camarines Sur, the second congressional district of Camarines Norte, the eastern part of Albay, the northeastern part of Sorsogon, San Pascual town in Masbate, and the southwestern part of Catanduanes. Central Bikol speakers can be found in all provinces of Bicol, and it is a majority language in Camarines Sur. The standard sprachraum form is based on the Canaman dialect. The language has also speakers outside their native regional homeland, especially in Metro Manila, Mindoro, Palawan, and Mindanao (particularly in Mati, Davao Oriental).

Central Bikol features some vocabulary not found in other Bikol languages nor in other members of the Central Philippine language family like Tagalog and Cebuano. Examples are the words matua and bitis, which are the same as the Kapampangan words meaning 'older' and 'foot, feet', respectively. The word banggi ('night') is another example of this as it is different from the usual Bikol word gab-i but closer to the word bengi of Kapampangan. There is no formal study on the relationship of the Central Luzon languages to Central Bikol but the latter has several words that are also found in the archaic form of Tagalog spoken in the Rizal and Quezon provinces that are believed to be the home of Central Luzon languages such as Kapampangan in Pampanga and southern Tarlac, and Sambalic languages in Zambales province.

== Central Bikol dialects ==
Because of its broad geographic coverage as compared with other Bikol languages separated by islands and mountains, Central Bikol diverged into six dialects, which are still mutually comprehensible. The division of the language into different dialects is mainly because of the influence of other Bikol and non-Bikol languages surrounding the region.

The Canaman dialect, despite being used by only a small portion of the population in Camarines Sur, is the standard form of Central Bikol used in literature, Catholic religious rites and mass media. Naga City dialect is spoken in the first, second, and third districts (except in Del Gallego, where residents are mostly Tagalog speakers), and in the western and eastern portions of the fourth district (Caramoan, Garchitorena, Presentacion, Siruma and Tinambac) of Camarines Sur. It is also spoken in San Pascual, Masbate (Burias Island) and the southwestern part of Catanduanes. The Partido dialect is spoken in the eastern part of Camarines Sur centered in the southern portion of the fourth district (Goa, Lagonoy, Sagñay, San Jose, and Tigaon). The Tabaco-Legazpi-Sorsogon (TLS) dialect is spoken in the eastern coast of Albay and the northeastern part of Sorsogon. TLS is the dialect that has been most influenced by the Inland Bikol languages. The Daet dialect, on the other hand, is spoken in the second district of the province of Camarines Norte. The Virac dialect (or Viracnon language) is spoken around Virac, Catanduanes and surrounding towns on the southeastern part of the island of Catanduanes.

=== Dialectal comparison of Central Bikol ===
The following table shows the sentence "Why did Pedro's bird not fly even though there is no lock to the cage?" translated to different dialects of Central Bikol along with some other languages in the region.

Canaman dialect (Standard)	Naga City dialect	Partido dialect	Tabaco - Legazpi - Sorsogon (TLS) dialect	Virac dialect	Daet dialect	Rinconada Bikol language (Inland Bikol)	Sorsoganon language (Bisakol)
Tàdaw ta dai luminayog an gamgam ni Pedro dawà na dai nin kandado an hawla?	Tâno daw ta dai naglayog an gamgam ni Pedro dawà na mayò nin kandado si hawla?	Hadáw ta ê naglayog an gamgam ni Pedro maski na mayò nin kandado su hawla?	Natà daw ta dai naglayog an bayong ni Pedro maski na warâ ki kandado su hawla?	Ngatà daw ta dài nagḽayog an gamgam ni Pedro maski na daing kandado su hawla?	Bakin daw kaya dai naglupad ang/a/ka ibon ni Pedro maski na mayong kandado si hawla?	Ta'onō/Ŋātâ raw ta diri naglayog adtoŋ bayoŋ ni Pedro dāwâ na ədâ ka kandado su awlā?	Nakay daw kay diri naglupad an tamsi ni Pedro maski na warâ san kandado su hawla?

Like other Philippine languages, Bikol has a number of loanwords, largely Spanish ones as a result of Spanish rule in the Philippines. These include swerte (suerte, 'luck'), karne (carne, 'meat'), imbestigador (investigador, 'investigator'), litro ('liter'), pero ('but'), and krimen (crimen, 'crime'). Another source of loanwords in Bikol is Sanskrit, with examples including words like bahala ('responsibility') and karma.

== Phonology ==
=== Consonants ===
There are 16 consonants in the Bikol language: /m, n, ŋ, p, t, k, ʔ, b, d, ɡ, s, h, l, w~ʋ, ɾ, j~ʝ/. Eight sounds are borrowed from loanwords: /f, v, ɲ, tʃ, dʒ, ʃ, ʒ, ʎ/.

The sound system of the language according to Mintz in 1971 is as follows.

		Labial	(Denti-) Alveolar	Palatal	Velar	Glottal
Nasal		m	n̪	(ɲ)	ŋ	
Stop/ Affricate	voiceless	p	t̪	(tʃ)	k	ʔ
Stop/ Affricate	voiced	b	d̪	(dʒ)	ɡ	
Fricative	voiceless	(f)	s	(ʃ)		h
Fricative	voiced	(v)		(ʒ)		
Lateral			l	(ʎ)		
Sonorant		w~ʋ	ɾ	j~ʝ		

==== Notes ====
1. ʃ – written as ⟨sy⟩, this is only found only in loan words from English, as in shirt.
2. tʃ – written as ⟨ty⟩, this is found in loan words from Spanish and English and is pronounced like the ch in check.
3. dʒ – written as ⟨dy⟩, this is found in loan words from English and is pronounced like the j sound in jeep.
4. ɲ – written as ⟨ny⟩, this is found in loan words from Spanish and is pronounced like the ñ in baños.
5. ʎ – written as ⟨ly⟩, this is found in loan words from Spanish and is pronounced like the ll in llave and sencillo (in Spanish dialects without yeísmo).
6. h – Due to contact with the nearby Albay Bikol languages, words that start with h in Bikol Naga, start with ʔ in Bikol Legazpi.
  - Ex: hiling ('look', Bikol Naga) becomes iling ('look', Bikol Legazpi)

=== Vowels ===
Native words exhibit a three-vowel system whose vowels can be noted as /a, i, u/, with /u/ realized (and spelled) as [o] in a final syllable and as [u] elsewhere, and /i/ realized dialectally as [e]. Due to contact with Spanish, modern Central Bikol also has the marginal phoneme /e/, distinct from /i/, in loanwords.

Table of the five general Central Bikol vowel phonemes
	Front	Central	Back
Close	i ⟨i⟩		u ⟨u⟩, ⟨o⟩
Mid	(e) ⟨e⟩		u ⟨u⟩, ⟨o⟩
Open		a ⟨a⟩	

There are four diphthongs: /iu̯/, /ui̯/, /au̯/, /ai̯/; /ui̯/ may be realized as [oi̯].

Note that when a word with an [o] in a final syllable is suffixed, that [o] becomes [u], but the spelling does not change. In words with reduplicated syllables and the vowel /u/, such as /kulkul/, both vowels are pronounced [u], and both are stressed (as with all reduplicated words).

== Grammar ==
	Absolutive	Ergative	Oblique
1st person singular	ako	ko	sakuya, sakô
2nd person singular	ika, ka	mo	saimo, sìmo
3rd person singular	siya	niya	saiya
1st person plural inclusive	kita	niato, ta	satuya, satô
1st person plural exclusive	kami	niamo, mi	samuya, samô
2nd person plural	kamo	nindo	saindo
3rd person plural	sinda	ninda	sainda

=== Particles ===
Like many other Philippine languages, Bikol has a rich set of discourse particles.

- bagá – (Tagalog: diba/nga) used for emphasis determined by context
- bayâ – giving a chance to someone; polite insisting
- daa – (Tagalog: daw) quoting information from a secondary source
- pati - emphasizing the condition that intensifies the difficulties. (Mauranon pati)
- daw – (Tagalog: ba/kaya) interrogative particle
- dawà/maski - (Tagalog: kahit) although
- dángan - (Tagalog: tapos) then
- garó – (Tagalog: mukhang, parang) likeness or similitude. English: 'It looks like, it's as if'.
- gáyo – 'exactly'
- daing gáyo – 'not exactly, not really'
- gayód – (Tagalog: bakâ) 'maybe, could be'
- giráray/liwát – (Tagalog: [m]uli) 'again'
- kutâ (na) – 'I hope (something did / did not happen'; 'If only ...' (conditionality of past events)
- lámang, lang/saná – (Tagalog: lang) 'only, just'
- lugód – hoping that something will happen, or expressing surrender/assent
- man – (Tagalog: din, rin) 'also' or 'ever' (such as ano man 'whatever' and si isay man 'whoever')
- malà - 1. relenting or agreeing (Mala, dumanan mo siya kun iyan an gusto mo) 2. one is yielding (Mala ta nagpahunod na siya.) 3. stating what actually happened (Mala iyan, inabotan mi sindang huruba.)
- mûna/ngûna – (Tagalog: muna) 'first' or 'yet'
- na – (Tagalog: na) 'now' or 'already'
- naman – (Tagalog: naman) 'again'
- nanggád – (Tagalog: talaga, nga) 'really, truly, absolutely' (adds a sense of certainty)
- niyako – 'I said'
- nganì – expresses fate ("This is helpless") or a plea for others not to insist
- ngántig – indicates to a person what they should say to another (Ini ngantig an dapat gibohon niya.)
- ngápit – 'in the future', 'later' (span of time)
- ngayá – expresses a hypothetical event/situation (Ini man ngaya an taguan ninda.)
- pa – (Tagalog: pa) 'still'
- palán – (Tagalog: pala) expresses surprise or sudden realization
- tabì – (Tagalog: po) politeness marker; po in some Bikol dialects due to the influence of Tagalog.
- harambili – 'lest' (Akuon ko na sana an ayuda kan barangay, harambiling makamati nin gutom. I'll just accept the help of the barangay, lest I will get hungry).
- túlos – (Tagalog: agad) 'immediately, right away'
- talagá – (Tagalog: talaga) 'really', 'truly'

== Numbers ==
=== Numerals ===
There exist two types of numerals in Bikol: native Bikol and Spanish numerals. Generally, Bicolanos use the Spanish terms when referring to time, as in the phrase a las singko ('5 o'clock'). However, the native terms can be read in literary books. The Spanish numerals are often encountered in pricing.

One-half.
Kabangâ / médiya
One.
Sarô / uno; una (used for time); un (used for counting higher numbers, rare)
Two.
Duwá / dos
Three.
Tuló / tres
Four.
Apát / kuwátro
Five.
Limá / síngko
Six.
Anóm / saís
Seven.
Pitó / siyéte
Eight.
Waló / ótso
Nine.
Siyám / nuwébe
Ten.
Sampulò / diyés
Eleven.
Kagsarô / ónse
Twelve.
Kagduwá / dóse
Thirteen.
Kagtuló / trése
Fourteen.
Kag-apát / katórse
Fifteen.
Kaglimá / kínse
Sixteen.
Kag-anóm / diyésisaís
Seventeen.
Kagpitó / diyésisiyéte
Eighteen.
Kagwaló / diyésiótso
Nineteen.
Kagsiyám / diyésinuwébe
Twenty.
Duwampulò / béynte (báynte)
Twenty-five.
Duwampulò may lima / béynte (báynte) y síngko
Thirty.
Tulompulò / tréynta (tráynta)
Thirty-five.
Tulompulò may lima / tréynta (traynta) y singko
Forty.
Apát na pulò / kuwarenta
Forty-five.
Apát na pulò may lima / kuwarenta y singko
Fifty.
Limampulò / singkuwénta
Fifty-five.
Limampulò may lima / singkuwénta y singko
Sixty.
Anóm na pulò / sesénta (sisénta)
Sixty-five.
Anóm na pulò may lima / sesenta (sisénta) y singko
Seventy.
Pitompulò / seténta (siténta)
Seventy-five.
Pitumpulò may lima / seténta (siténta) y singkó
Eighty.
Walompulò / otsénta
Eighty-five.
Walompulò may lima / otsénta y singko
Ninety.
Siyam na pulò / nobenta
Ninety-five.
Siyam na pulò may lima / nobenta y singko
One-hundred.
Sanggatós / siyen, siyento
One-thousand.
Sangribo / Un mil
Ten-thousand.
Sangyukot (Old Bikol) / Diyes mil
One-million.
Sanglaksâ (Old Bikol) / Milyón

== Angry speech register ==
The angry register of Bikol, also known natively as tamanggot or rapsak, is used when angry, shouting, or speaking in a high-pitched voice at someone. Some examples of the register include:

Normal Bikol	Angry-register Bikol	English translation
malutò	malustod	rice (cooked)
bagas	las(u)gas	rice (uncooked)
tubig	tamìlig, tùlig	water
bungog	lusngog	deaf
uran	bagrat	rain
bagyo	alimagyo	typhoon/hurricane
babayi	babaknit, siknit	female
lalaki	lalaknit	male
bado, gubing	la(ma)sdô, gubnit	clothes
harong (Naga), balay (Legazpi)	langag	house
sira	sigtok, buragtok	fish
ikos	k(ur)asmag, kurakod	cat
ayam, idò	da(ma)yô (Naga), ga(ma)dyâ (Legazpi)	dog
damulag (Naga), karabaw (Legazpi)	ga(ma)dyâ (Naga)	carabao
humali	wumara	leave
magkakan/kumakan (Naga), magkaon/kumaon (Legazpi)	hablô, humablô, habluon, sibà, sumibà, sumibsib	eat
burat (Naga), buyong (Legazpi)	lasngag, lusrat, lusyong, bultok	drunk
taram	tabil	to speak
kapot, kapotan	kamlô, kamlùon	to hold, holding
hiling	butlâ	to see
bitis	s(am)ingkil, samail, siki	foot
talinga	talingugngog	ear
ngusò (Naga), ngimot (Legazpi)	ngurapak, ngaspak, ngislo	mouth
kamot	kamulmog	hand
mata	ma(ta)lsok	eye
payo	ali(ma)ntak	head
hawak (Naga), lawas (Legazpi)	kabangkayan	body
tulak	tindos, la(ma)sdak	belly/stomach
sapatos	sapagtok	shoe
kalayo	kalasbot	fire
kawali	kawalwag	frying pan
sarwal	sarigwal	shorts or underwear (Note: Depends on the dialect of Bikol; in some dialects, sarwal means 'shorts', while in others, it means 'underwear'.)
asin	tasik	salt
manok	maldos, malpak	chicken

== See also ==
- Bikol languages
