= Inagta Partido language =

Endangered Bikol language of Philippines

Inagta Partido
- Isarog Agta
- Native to: Philippines
- Ethnicity: Agta
- Native speakers: ~12 (2018) or 1,000 (1984)
- Language family: Austronesian: Malayo-Polynesian; Philippine; Central Philippine; Bikol languages; Coastal Bikol; Inagta Partido

Language codes
- ISO 639-3: agk
- Glottolog: isar1235
- ELP: Isarog Agta

Inagta Partido (Isarog Agta) or alternatively Katubung is a nearly extinct Bikol language spoken by a semi-nomadic hunter-gatherer Agta (Negrito) people of the Philippines. It is found on Mount Isarog east of Naga City particularly in the town of Ocampo where the most recent survey of the language was conducted.

According to Lobel (2013), there are no speakers of Inagta Partido under 60. It is a moribund language. The Ethnologue cites a report from 2000 that there were then only five speakers from an ethnic population of about 1,000. Due to the lack of native speakers, UNESCO classified the language as "critically endangered".

Inagta Partido has borrowed heavily from Bikol languages such as Bikol Naga and Bikol Partido, but has a non-Bikol substratum.
