= Mount Iraya Agta language =

Language

Mt. Iraya Agta
- Buhi Agta (East)
- Native to: Philippines
- Native speakers: likely extinct (2013)
- Language family: Austronesian: Malayo-Polynesian; Philippine; Central Philippine; Bikol languages; Coastal Bikol; Mt. Iraya Agta

Language codes
- ISO 639-3: atl
- Glottolog: mtir1236
- ELP: Mount Iraya Agta

Mount Iraya Agta is a Bikol language spoken by a semi-nomadic hunter-gatherer Agta (Negrito) people of the Philippines, east of Lake Buhi in Luzon. It is mutually intelligible with Mount Iriga Agta on the other side of the lake.

As of 2013, the Mount Iraya Agta language may be extinct. The Mount Iraya Agta live on the eastern side of Lake Buhi in Camarines Sur, near the border with the town of Tiwi, Albay. Mount Iraya Agta had borrowed so heavily from Bikol that it was indistinguishable from neighboring non-Agta languages except for a very small amount of lexicon, based on evidence from a 1984 SIL wordlist. The Mount Iraya Agta people now speak Buhinon and Bikol Naga/Partido.
