= Gigmoto =

Municipality in Catanduanes, Philippines

- Municipality
- Municipality of Gigmoto
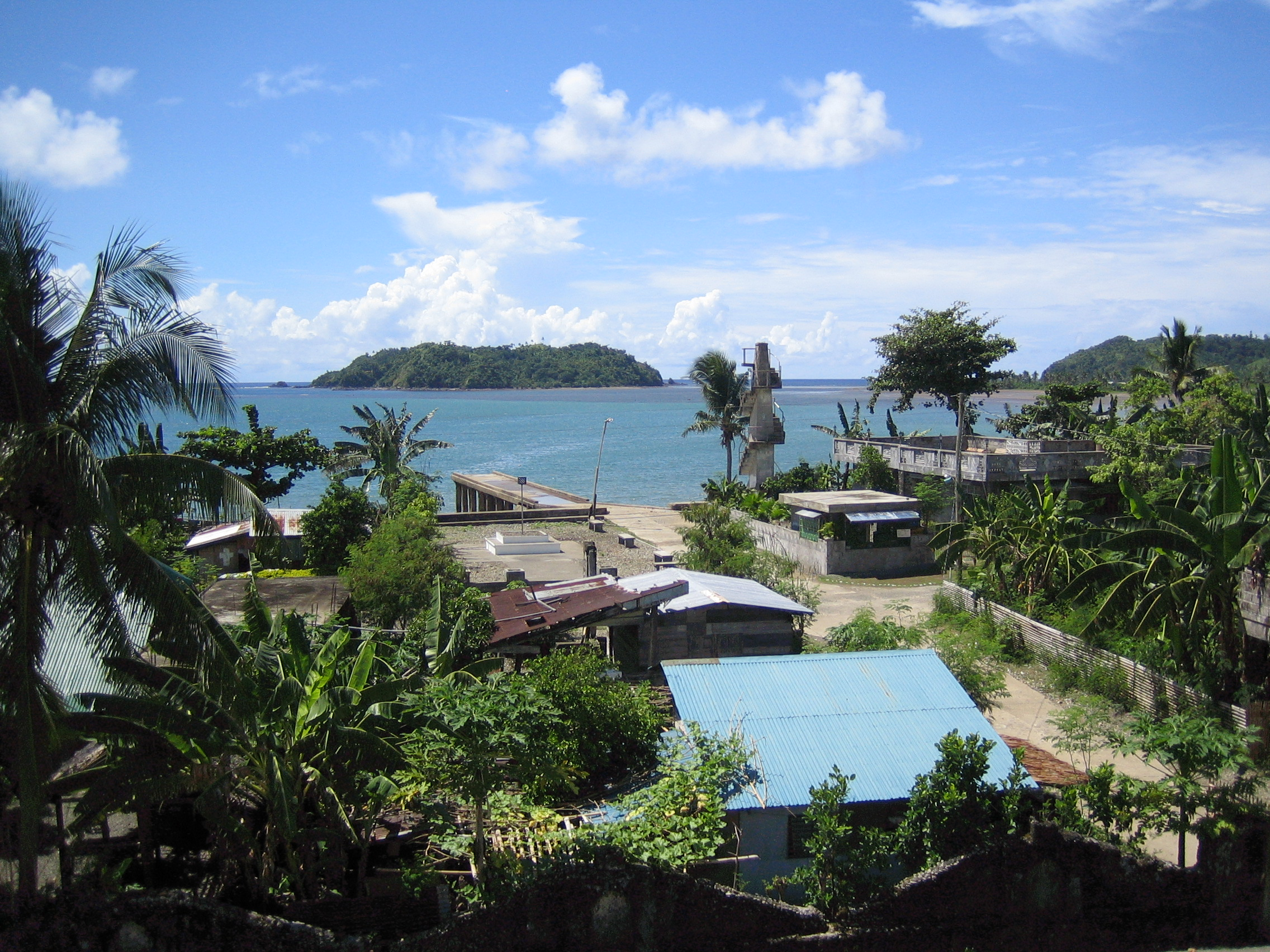
- Poblacion

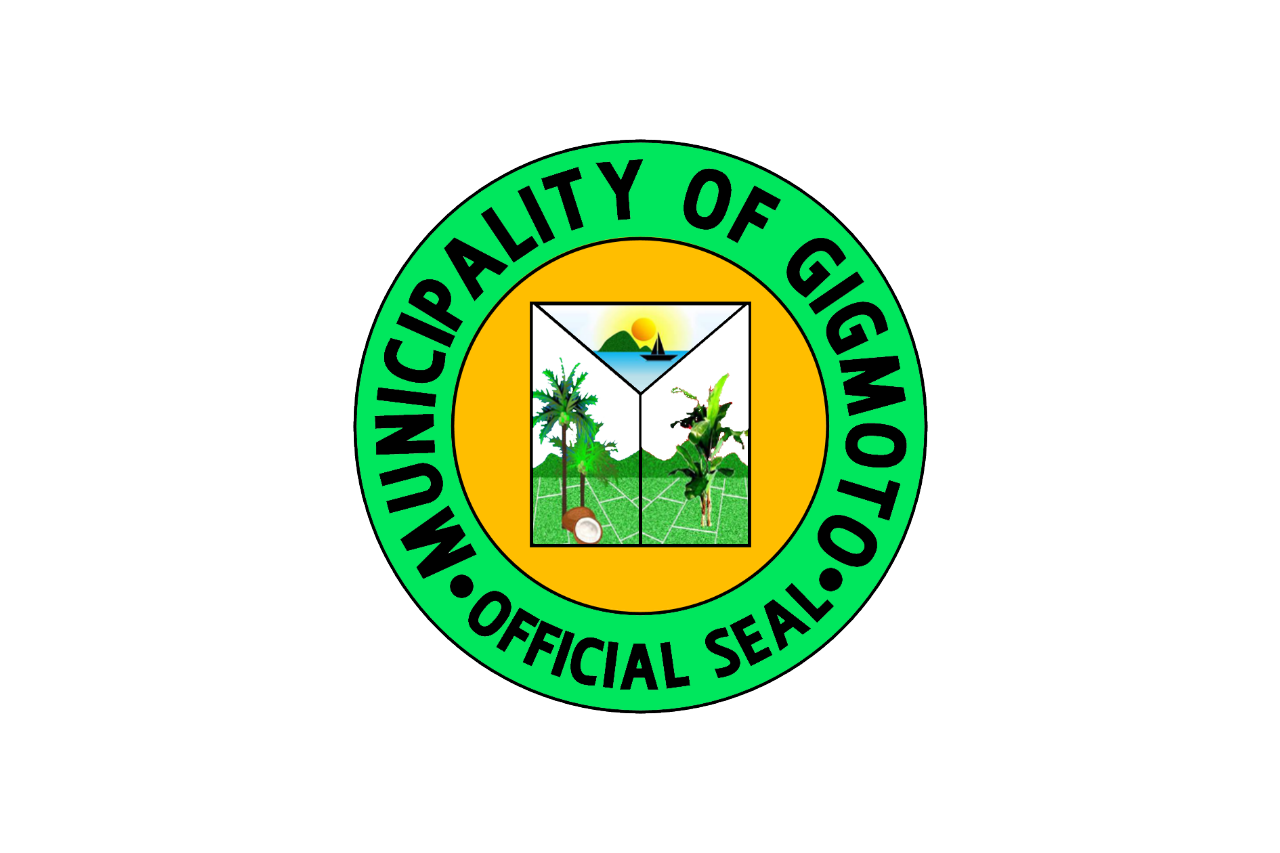
- Flag
- Interactive map of Gigmoto
- Location within the Philippines
- Coordinates: 13°47′N 124°23′E
- Country: Philippines
- Region: Bicol Region
- Province: Catanduanes
- District: Lone district
- Founded: June 15, 1951
- Barangays: 9 (see Barangays)

Government
  - Type: Sangguniang Bayan
  - Mayor: Vicente J. Tayam Jr.
  - Vice Mayor: Engr. Rodrigo Barrameda Tud Turado
  - Representative: Eulogio R. Rodriguez
  - Municipal Council: Members: Jake T. Tolledo; Wilbert C. Jimenez; Nilo S. Tanael; Paulo J. Camacho; Adolfo A. Sarmiento Jr.; Eleazar T. Guerrero; Erma T. Tud; Ruben L. Tenoria
  - Electorate: 7,717 voters (2025)

Area
  - Total: 181.82 km^{2} (70.20 sq mi)
- Elevation: 155 m (509 ft)
- Highest elevation: 643 m (2,110 ft)
- Lowest elevation: 0 m (0 ft)

Population (2024 census)
  - Total: 8,348
  - Density: 45.91/km^{2} (118.9/sq mi)
  - Households: 1,955

Economy
  - Income class: 4th municipal income class
  - Poverty incidence: 29.53% (2023)
  - Revenue: ₱ 203.9 million (2024)
  - Assets: ₱ 223.5 million (2024)
  - Expenditure: ₱ 116.6 million (2024)
  - Liabilities: ₱ 19.62 million (2024)

Service provider
  - Electricity: First Catanduanes Electric Cooperative (FICELCO)
- Time zone: UTC+8 (PST)
- ZIP code: 4804
- PSGC: 0502005000
- IDD : area code: +63 (0)52
- Native languages: Bicol
- Website: www.gigmoto-catanduanes.gov.ph

Gigmoto, officially the Municipality of Gigmoto, is a municipality in the province of Catanduanes, Philippines. According to the 2024 census, it has a population of 8,348 people, making it the least populated municipality in the province.

== Etymology ==
The name "Gigmoto" originated from the Bicol word himbot that means “just in time”. This is supposedly related to the romantic venture of a young man from Baras seeking to court a maiden from the town of Viga. Competing with several other suitors, the man traveled northbound to win the love of the maiden. He was overtaken by the night, so he slept in that place. In the morning he proceeded to Viga, arriving there just before nightfall. After staying for a period of time in Viga, the man from Baras won the heart of the woman. When the lovers were bound for Baras, they stayed overnight at Gigmoto – “just in time” for their first romantic night of being together.

As years went by Himbotan was changed to Higmoto. Years thereafter, believing that with the “H” Higmoto seemed to be a Japanese word, the “H” was changed to “G” – thus the name Gigmoto.

== History ==
The first families to settle there were the Tanaels, followed by the Dayawons, both from Baras. The Tolledos, the Tatings and the Tatads came next. Other families from Baras, Bato and from the town of Virac had come and ultimately made Gigmoto the biggest barrio of the Municipality of Baras.

The town was created from the barrios of Sicmil and Sioron from Viga and the barrios of San Vicente, Gigmoto, Biong and Dororian from Baras.

On June 15, 1951, the government officials for the newly created town were appointed by the then Congressman Severiano de Leon who authored the bill creating the municipality with the approval of President Elpidio Quirino. Mr. Juan Q. Sarmiento who happened to be the first public school teacher became the first mayor with Andres Dayawon as vice mayor. Messrs. Maximo Tapalla, Apolinar Tatad, Marcelino Dayawon and Apolinar Joson were then appointed municipal councilors. Mr. Candido Tuboro became the first municipal treasurer. Fr. Andres Tablizo was the parish priest and Mr. Serafin Rodulfo was the first principal.

== Geography ==
Gigmoto is 51 kilometres (32 mi) from the provincial capital town Virac.

=== Barangays ===
Gigmoto is politically subdivided into 9 barangays. Each barangay consists of puroks and some have sitios.

- Biong
- Dororian
- Poblacion District I
- Poblacion District II
- Poblacion District III
- San Pedro
- San Vicente
- Sicmil
- Sioron

=== Climate ===
Climate data for Gigmoto
Month	Jan	Feb	Mar	Apr	May	Jun	Jul	Aug	Sep	Oct	Nov	Dec	Year
Mean daily maximum °C (°F)	29.3 (84.7)	29.6 (85.3)	30.5 (86.9)	31.4 (88.5)	32.3 (90.1)	32.6 (90.7)	32.3 (90.1)	32.4 (90.3)	32.2 (90.0)	31.4 (88.5)	30.7 (87.3)	29.7 (85.5)	31.2 (88.2)
Daily mean °C (°F)	25.7 (78.3)	25.7 (78.3)	26.4 (79.5)	27.2 (81.0)	28.1 (82.6)	28.4 (83.1)	28.2 (82.8)	28.3 (82.9)	27.9 (82.2)	27.3 (81.1)	27.0 (80.6)	26.3 (79.3)	27.2 (81.0)
Mean daily minimum °C (°F)	22.1 (71.8)	21.9 (71.4)	22.3 (72.1)	23.1 (73.6)	23.9 (75.0)	24.2 (75.6)	24.1 (75.4)	24.2 (75.6)	23.7 (74.7)	23.3 (73.9)	23.3 (73.9)	22.9 (73.2)	23.2 (73.9)
Average rainfall mm (inches)	420 (16.5)	345 (13.6)	334 (13.1)	148 (5.8)	200 (7.9)	224 (8.8)	319 (12.6)	209 (8.2)	331 (13.0)	687 (27.0)	944 (37.2)	731 (28.8)	4,892 (192.5)
Source: Climate-Data.org

Gigmoto has a tropical rainforest climate (Af) with heavy to very heavy rainfall year-round and with extremely heavy rainfall from October to December.

== Demographics ==
Population census of Gigmoto
Year	Pop.	±% p.a.
1960	5,697	—
1970	5,133	−1.04%
1975	5,950	+3.01%
1980	6,137	+0.62%
1990	6,487	+0.56%
1995	6,736	+0.71%
2000	7,055	+1.00%
2007	7,569	+0.97%
2010	8,003	+2.05%
2015	8,368	+0.85%
2020	8,712	+0.85%
2024	8,348	−1.02%
Source: Philippine Statistics Authority

In the 2024 census, the population of Gigmoto was 8,348 people, with a density of 46 inhabitants per square kilometre or 120 inhabitants per square mile.

== Economy ==
Poverty incidence of Gigmoto (%)

Source: Philippine Statistics Authority

== Education ==
The Gigmoto Schools District Office governs all educational institutions within the municipality. It oversees the management and operations of all private and public, from primary to secondary schools.

=== Primary and elementary schools ===
- Biong Elementary School
- Dororian Elementary School
- Gigmoto Central Elementary School
- San Pedro Elementary School
- Sioron Elementary School
- Dominador C. Guerrero Elementary School

=== Secondary schools ===
- Dororian National High School
- Gigmoto Rural Development High School
- Sicmil Integrated School

== Notable personalities ==
- Francisco Tatad, Filipino journalist and politician

== Gallery ==
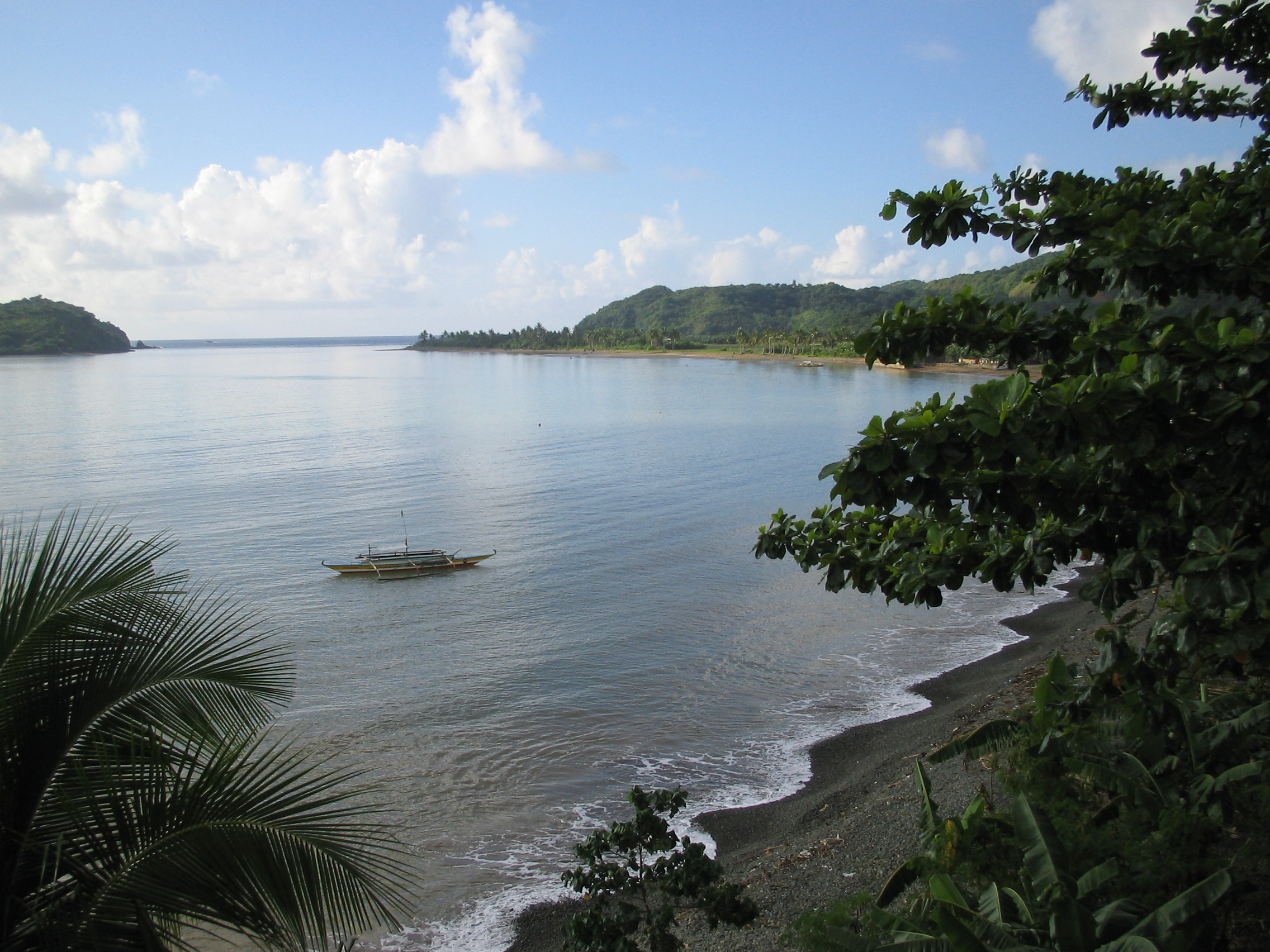
Gigmoto coast

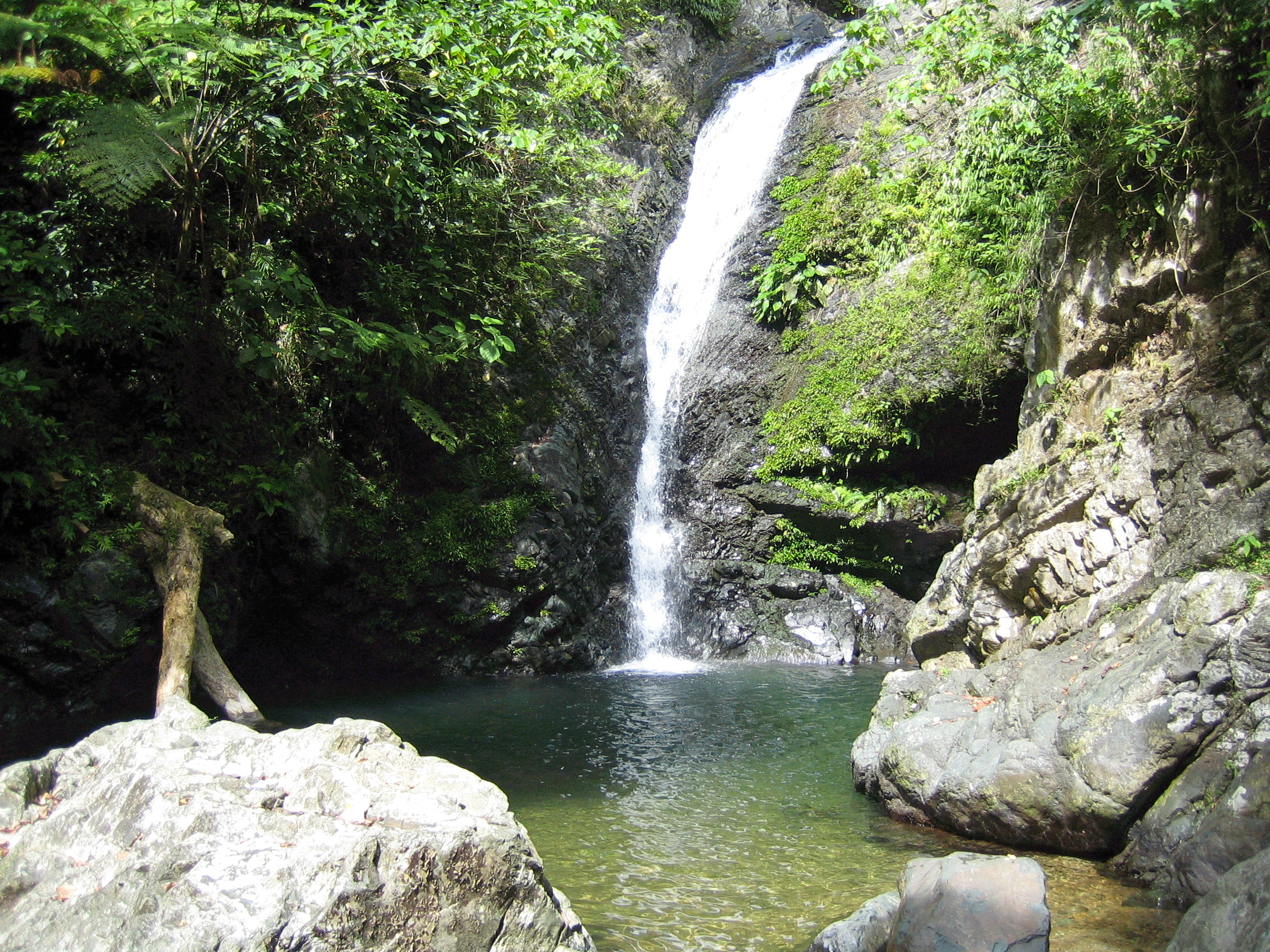
Nahulugan Falls

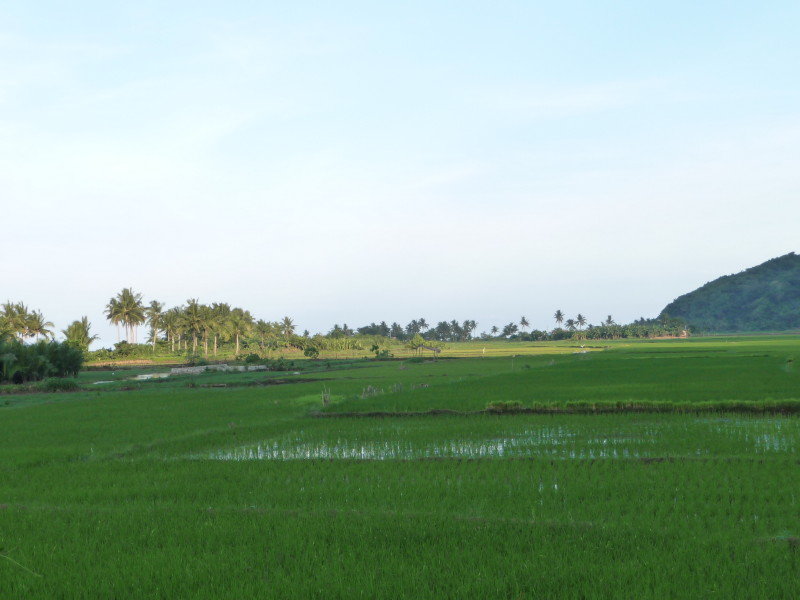
Ricefield at Barangay Biong
