= Juban, Sorsogon =

Municipality in Sorsogon, Philippines

Juban
- Municipality
- Municipality of Juban
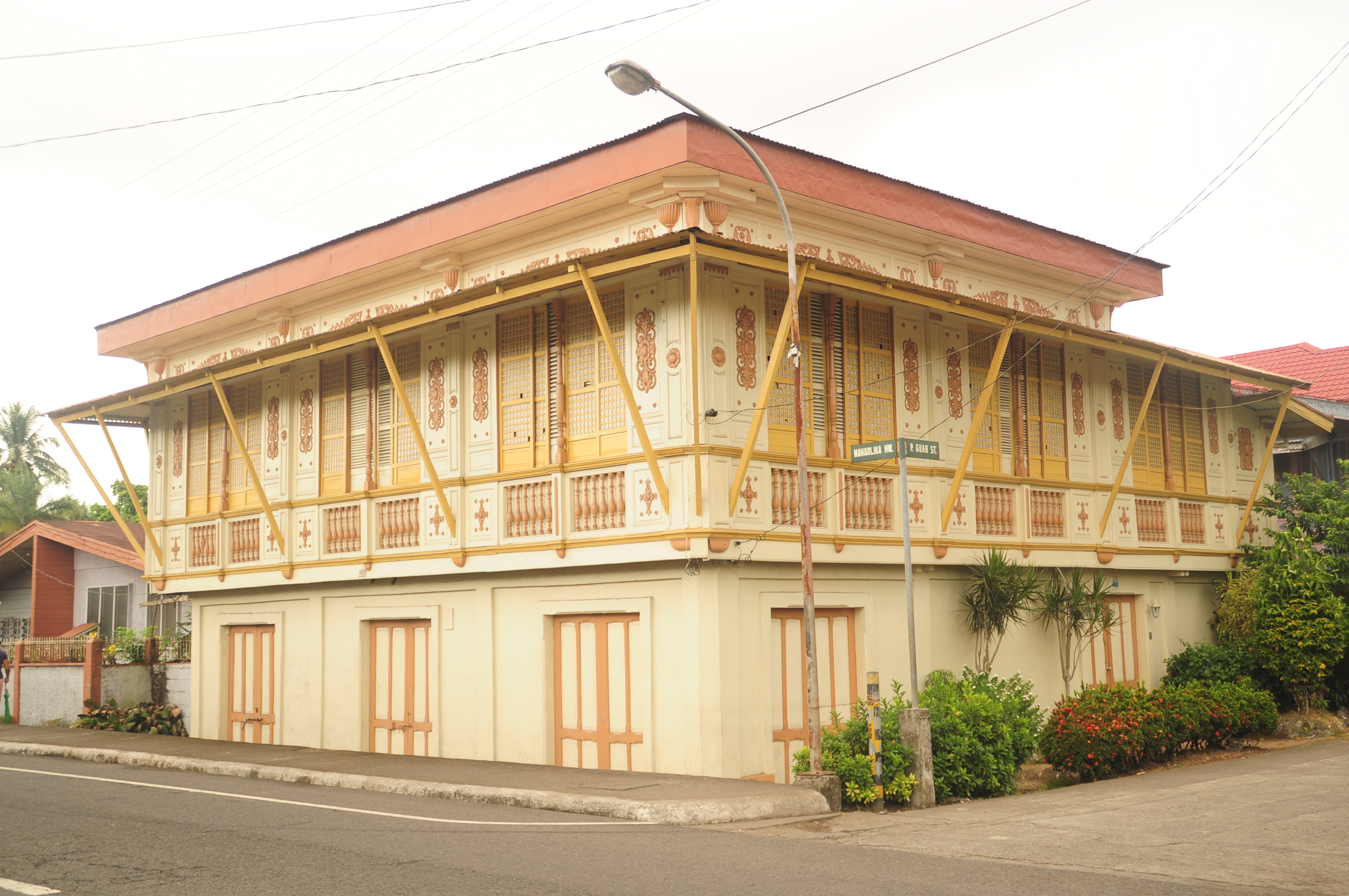
- Ancestral house

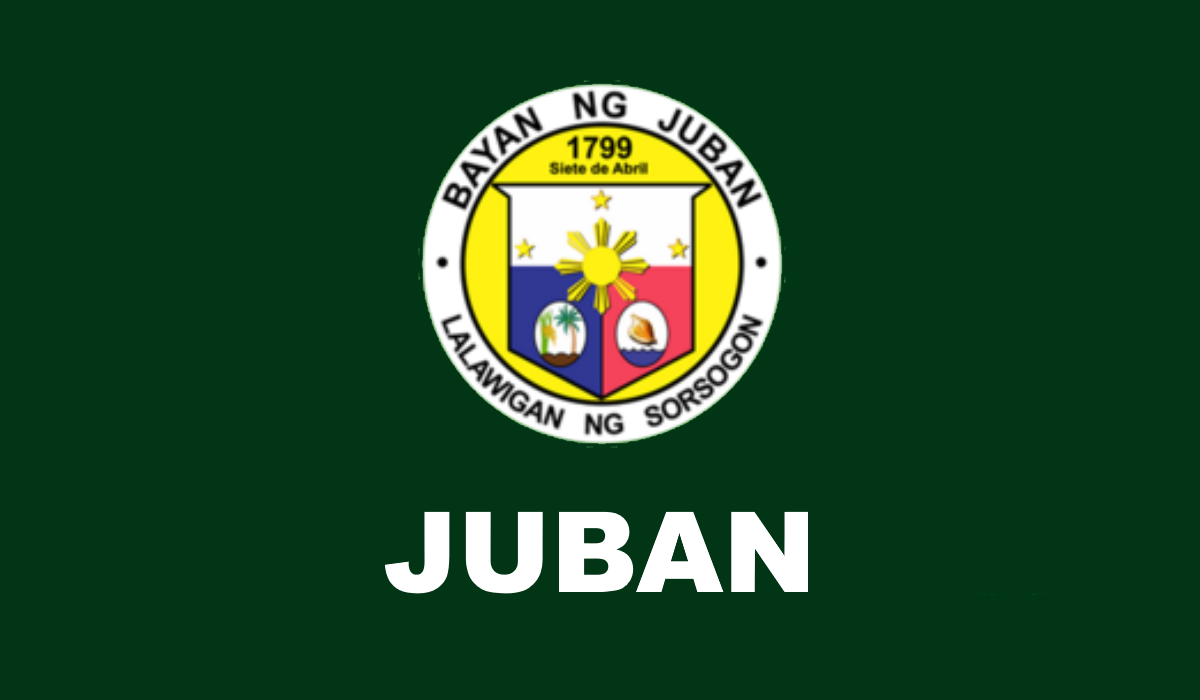
- Flag Seal

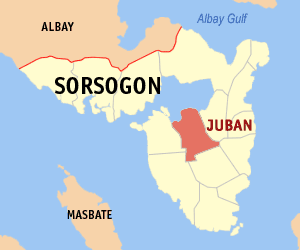
- Map of Sorsogon with Juban highlighted
- Interactive map of Juban
- Location within the Philippines
- Coordinates: 12°50′52″N 123°59′22″E
- Country: Philippines
- Region: Bicol Region
- Province: Sorsogon
- District: 2nd district
- Founded: 7 April 1799
- Barangays: 25 (see Barangays)

Government
  - Type: Sangguniang Bayan
  - Mayor: Rogel "Botox" Fulleros
  - Vice Mayor: Felipe G. Guasa
  - Representative: Manuel “Wowo” L. Fortes, Jr.
  - Municipal Council: Members: Atty. Gershon F. Cariño; Danilo L. Dolosa; Ryan G. De Jesus; Roy F. Balbedina; Nenita R. Desder; Achilles H. Alindogan; Rey Romeo L. Guab; Aida L. Guevarra
  - Electorate: 24,717 voters (2025)

Area
  - Total: 121.49 km^{2} (46.91 sq mi)
- Elevation: 160 m (520 ft)
- Highest elevation: 833 m (2,733 ft)
- Lowest elevation: 7 m (23 ft)

Population (2024 census)
  - Total: 35,978
  - Density: 296.14/km^{2} (767.00/sq mi)
  - Households: 7,719
- Demonym: Jubangnon

Economy
  - Income class: 2nd municipal income class
  - Poverty incidence: 39.36% (2023)
  - Revenue: ₱ 196.5 million (2024)
  - Assets: ₱ 582.4 million (2024)
  - Expenditure: ₱ 187.4 million (2024)
  - Liabilities: ₱ 127.3 million (2024)

Service provider
  - Electricity: Sorsogon 1 Electric Cooperative (SORECO 1)
- Time zone: UTC+8 (PST)
- ZIP code: 4703
- PSGC: 0506210000
- IDD : area code: +63 (0)56
- Native languages: Sorsogon language Tagalog
- Patron saint: St Anthony of Padua

Juban, officially the Municipality of Juban, is a municipality in the province of Sorsogon, Philippines. According to the 2024 census, it has a population of 35,978 people.

The old houses of Juban are a key heritage feature of the town. These homes, built during the Spanish period, show the early architecture and history of the province. They remain an important part of Juban’s identity and cultural landscape.

The 1818 census showed 396 native families paying tribute and they were coexisting with 18 Spanish-Filipino families in the area.

== Geography ==
Juban is 22 kilometres (14 mi) from Sorsogon City and 603 kilometres (375 mi) from Manila.

=== Barangays ===
Juban is politically subdivided into 25 barangays. Each barangay consists of puroks and some have sitios.

- Añog
- Aroroy
- Bacolod
- Binanuahan
- Biriran
- Buraburan
- Calateo
- Calmayon
- Caruhayon
- Catanagan
- Catanusan
- Cogon
- Embarcadero
- Guruyan
- Lajong
- Maalo
- North Poblacion
- Puting Sapa
- Rangas
- Sablayan
- Sipaya
- South Poblacion
- Taboc
- Tinago
- Tughan

=== Climate ===
Climate data for Juban, Sorsogon
Month	Jan	Feb	Mar	Apr	May	Jun	Jul	Aug	Sep	Oct	Nov	Dec	Year
Mean daily maximum °C (°F)	27 (81)	28 (82)	29 (84)	31 (88)	31 (88)	30 (86)	29 (84)	29 (84)	29 (84)	29 (84)	29 (84)	28 (82)	29 (84)
Mean daily minimum °C (°F)	22 (72)	21 (70)	22 (72)	23 (73)	24 (75)	25 (77)	25 (77)	25 (77)	25 (77)	24 (75)	23 (73)	23 (73)	24 (74)
Average precipitation mm (inches)	65 (2.6)	44 (1.7)	42 (1.7)	39 (1.5)	87 (3.4)	150 (5.9)	184 (7.2)	153 (6.0)	163 (6.4)	154 (6.1)	127 (5.0)	100 (3.9)	1,308 (51.4)
Average rainy days	13.9	9.2	11.0	12.5	19.6	24.3	26.5	25.0	25.5	24.4	19.4	15.1	226.4
Source: Meteoblue (modeled/calculated data, not measured locally)

== Demographics ==
Population census of Juban
Year	Pop.	±% p.a.
1903	7,043	—
1918	12,234	+3.75%
1939	11,960	−0.11%
1948	11,967	+0.01%
1960	12,918	+0.64%
1970	16,286	+2.34%
1975	16,809	+0.64%
1980	19,660	+3.18%
1990	20,671	+0.50%
1995	23,803	+2.68%
2000	26,848	+2.61%
2007	28,989	+1.06%
2010	30,335	+1.67%
2015	32,320	+1.21%
2020	35,297	+1.87%
2024	35,978	+0.46%
Source: Philippine Statistics Authority

== Economy ==
Poverty incidence of Juban (%)

Source: Philippine Statistics Authority

== Education ==
The Juban Schools District Office governs all educational institutions within the municipality. It oversees the management and operations of all private and public, from primary to secondary schools.

=== Primary and elementary schools ===
- Anog Elementary School
- Bacolod Elementary School
- Biriran Elementary School
- Calateo Elementary School
- Calmayon Elementary School
- Caruhayon Elementary School
- Catanagan Elementary School
- Catanusan Elementary School
- Cogon Elementary School
- Embarcadero Elementary School
- Grefalda Elementary School
- Guruyan Elementary School
- Holy Family Center of Studies
- Jagusara Elementary School
- Jose G. Alindogan Elementary School
- Maalo Elementary School
- Mario G. Guarina Elementary School
- Putingsapa Elementary School
- R.P. Tabuena Elementary School
- Sablayan Elementary School
- Sangkayon Elementary School
- Sipaya Elementary School
- Taboc Elementary School
- Tampi Elementary School
- The Little Child of St. Anthony of Padua Parochial School
- Tublijon Elementary School

=== Secondary schools ===
- Biriran National High School
- Guruyan High School
- Juban National High School
- Juban Institute
- Lajong National High School
- Olimpio A. Guarin Jr. National High School
- Sablayan High School

== Notable personalities ==
- Mario Guariña – Filipino senator from 1916 to 1919 and governor of Sorsogon from 1908 to 1912
- Eddie Garcia - Filipino actor, television personality, and filmmaker
