= Albay Bikol language =

Inland Bikol language subgroup spoken in the Philippines

Albay Bikol
- Native to: Philippines
- Region: Bicol
- Native speakers: 700,000; 300,000 of rbl; 260,000 of fbl; 73,600 of ubl; 68,800 of lbl (2009 SIL)
- Language family: Austronesian: Malayo-Polynesian; Philippine; Central Philippine; Bikol languages; Inland Bikol; Albay Bikol

Language codes
- ISO 639-3: Variously: ubl – Boînën (Buhiʼnon) lbl – Libon Bikol rbl – Miraya Bikol fbl – West Albay Bikol
- Glottolog: alba1269

Albay Bikol, or simply Albayanon is a group of languages and one of the three languages that compose Inland Bikol. It is spoken in the southwestern coast of Albay, (Pio Duran, Jovellar) and northwestern Sorsogon. The region is bordered by the Coastal Bikol and Rinconada Bikol speakers. The latter is the closest language of Albay Bikol and is mutually intelligible. They are both included in Inland Bikol group of languages.

Albay Bikol is the only sub-group of the Inland Bikol group with several languages with in it. The member languages in this sub-grouping lack stressed syllables, rare, if there is, and that makes them different and unique from other Bikol languages. The said feature of Albay Bikol is comparable to French and Portuguese languages that rarely use stressed syllables.

== Phonology ==
West Albay Vowels
	Front	Central	Back
Close	i	ɨ	u
Mid	ɛ		ɔ
Open	a		

West Albay Consonants
		Labial	Alveolar	Palatal	Velar	Glottal
Nasal		m	n		ŋ	
Plosive/ Affricate	voiceless	p	t	(tʃ)	k	ʔ
Plosive/ Affricate	voiced	b	d	(dʒ)	ɡ	
Fricative			s	(ʃ)		
Tap			ɾ			
Approximant		w	l	j		

/tʃ/ is borrowed from loanwords.

Sounds [dʒ, ʃ] are heard from borrowings as a realization of sequences ⟨di, si⟩.

Boînën Vowels
	Front	Central	Back
Close	i		u
Mid		ə	
Open		a	

Boînën Consonants
	Labial	Dental	Alveolar	Post- alveolar	Palatal	Velar	Glottal
Nasal	m		n			ŋ	
Plosive	p b	t̪	d			k ɡ	ʔ
Fricative				s			
Tap				ɾ			
Approximant	w	l̪			j	ɰ	

== Dialectal variation ==
"Were you there at the market for a long time?" translated into Albay Bikol languages, Coastal Bikol and Rinconada Bikol.

Coastal Bikol	Boînën (Lake Buhi)	Libon	Oasnon/West Miraya	Daraga/East Miraya	Rinconada Bikol
Nahaloy ka duman sa saod?	Naëg̓ëy ika adto sa saran?	Naoban ika adtu sa sawod?	Naëlëy ka idto sa sëd?	Naëlay ka didto sa sâran?	Naëban ika sadto saran?

== Orthography ==
Boînën has the following orthography for native vocabulary:

Aa Bb Dd Ëë Gg G̓g̓ Ii Kk Ll Mm Nn NGng Oo Pp Rr Ss Tt Ww Yy.

Ë is used for /ə/, G̓ for /ɰ/, and O for /ʊ/.

Cc, Ee, Ff, Hh, Jj, Ññ, Qq, Uu, Vv, Xx, Zz only occur in loans and proper names.

A circumflex accent is used for glottal stop at the end of a word or before a consonant, as in the name Boînën /bʊiʔnən/. Glottal stop is not written at the beginning of a word or between vowels; instead, a tie bar is used to mark the absence of a glottal stop in sequences where it might occur. This includes identical vowels, ⟨a͡a ë͡ë i͡i o͡o⟩, and sequences that begin with /a/: ⟨a͡ë a͡i a͡o⟩. For a front or back vowel followed by a central vowel, a Y or W is used: ⟨iya, iyë, owa, owë⟩. This vowel hiatus frequently corresponds to a Tagalog ⟨h⟩ (e.g. Boînën ka͡oy, Tagalog kahoy 'wood'). Both diacritics can occur, as in ba͡â 'flood'. Glottal stop can occur in the sequences that would otherwise take a tie bar (other than ⟨ii⟩, as /iʔi/ does not occur), and in addition occurs in ⟨ia ië⟩.

Hiatus	Glottal stop
a͡a	aa
ë͡ë	ëë
i͡i	
o͡o	oo
a͡ë	aë
a͡i	ai
a͡o	ao
iya	ia
iyë	ie
owa	
owë	
oi	

== See also ==
- Languages of the Philippines
