= Ocampo, Camarines Sur =

Municipality in Camarines Sur, Philippines

Ocampo Mabatobato
- Municipality
- Municipality of Ocampo
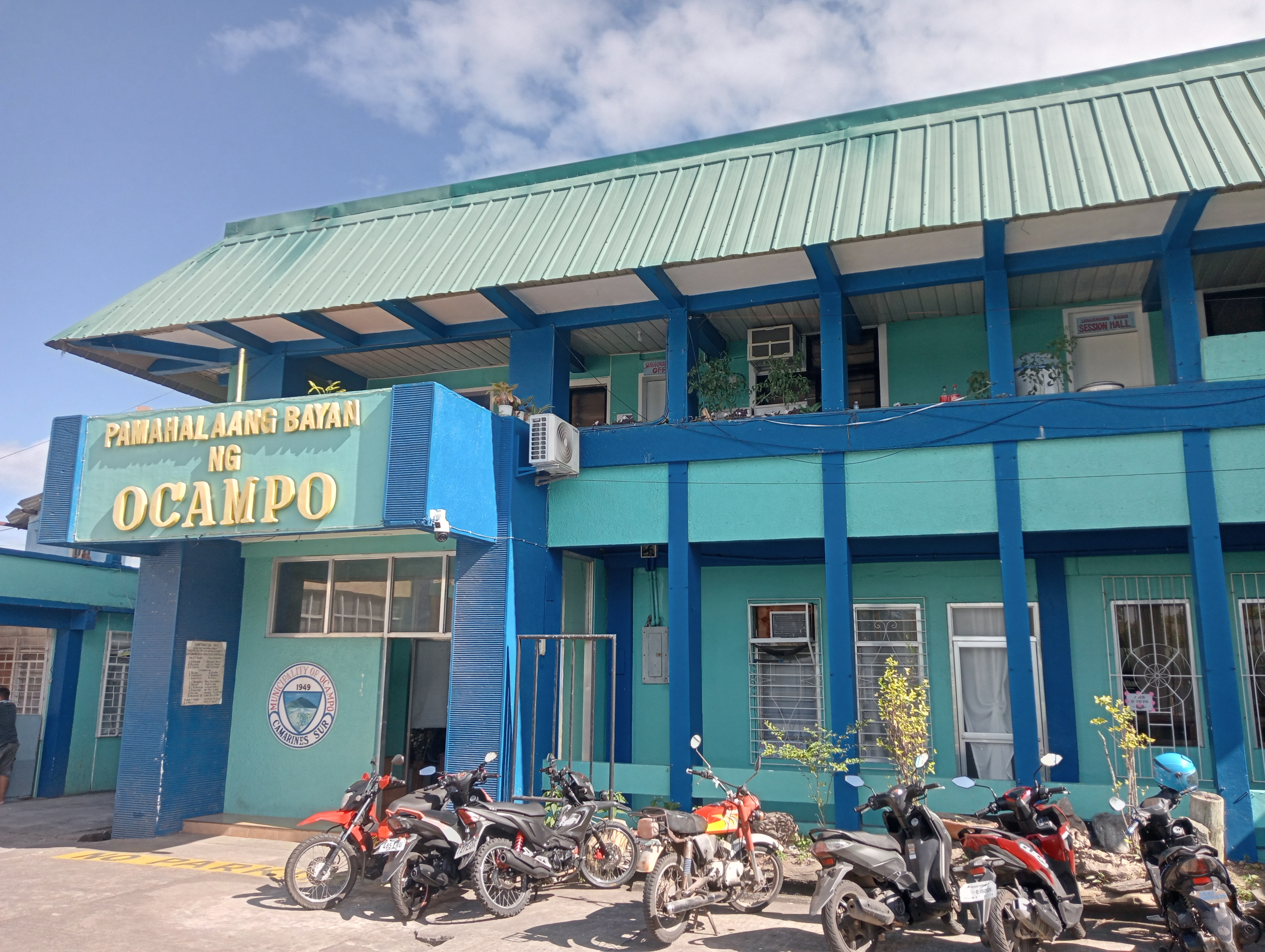
- Municipal Hall

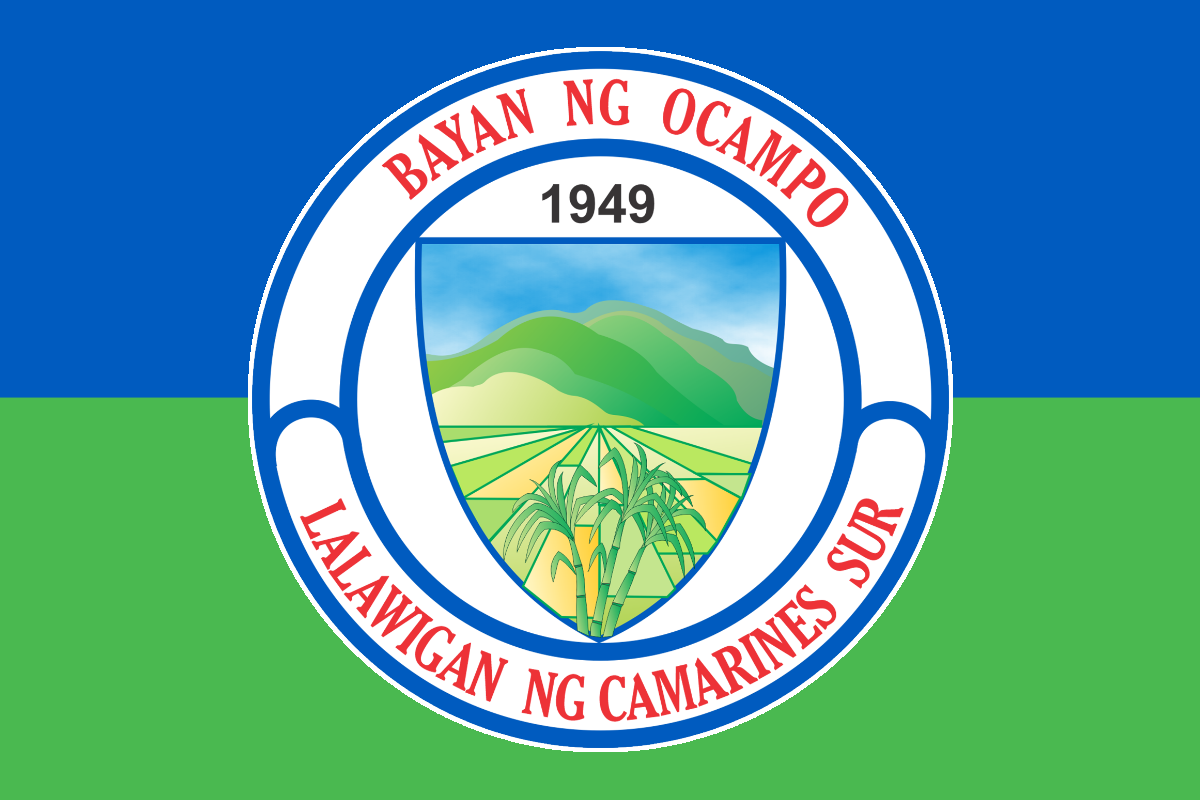
- Flag
- Motto: Padagos Ocampo!
- Map of Camarines Sur with Ocampo highlighted
- Interactive map of Ocampo
- Location within the Philippines
- Coordinates: 13°33′34″N 123°22′34″E
- Country: Philippines
- Region: Bicol Region
- Province: Camarines Sur
- District: 3rd district
- Founded: 1949
- Barangays: 25 (see Barangays)

Government
  - Type: Sangguniang Bayan
  - Mayor: Ronald Allan J. Go
  - Vice Mayor: Fidel R. Carido, Jr.
  - Representative: Nelson S. Legacion
  - Municipal Council: Members: Eliseo C. Garcia; Kenneth Sean A. Bihag; Charlo V. Brandes; Bernard C. Aquiler; Teresa Michele S. Soriano; Jose V. Dacuya; Midel P. Tanay; Ruel N. Irlanda
  - Electorate: 30,473 voters (2025)

Area
  - Total: 118.33 km^{2} (45.69 sq mi)
- Elevation: 109 m (358 ft)
- Highest elevation: 521 m (1,709 ft)
- Lowest elevation: 23 m (75 ft)

Population (2024 census)
  - Total: 49,535
  - Density: 418.62/km^{2} (1,084.2/sq mi)
  - Households: 10,967

Economy
  - Income class: 2nd municipal income class
  - Poverty incidence: 29.91% (2023)
  - Revenue: ₱ 211 million (2024)
  - Assets: ₱ 522.5 million (2024)
  - Expenditure: ₱ 172.9 million (2024)
  - Liabilities: ₱ 83.51 million (2024)

Service provider
  - Electricity: Camarines Sur 4 Electric Cooperative (CASURECO 4)
- Time zone: UTC+8 (PST)
- ZIP code: 4419
- PSGC: 0501725000
- IDD : area code: +63 (0)54
- Native languages: Central Bikol; Tagalog
- Website: ocampo.camarinessur.gov.ph

Ocampo, officially the Municipality of Ocampo (Central Bikol: Banwaan kan Ocampo; Rinconada Bikol: Banwāan ka Ocampo; Tagalog: Bayan ng Ocampo), is a municipality in the province of Camarines Sur, Philippines. According to the 2024 census, it has a population of 49,535 people.

== Etymology ==
Formerly, the town was named Mabatobato due to huge rocks located in the area. It was then renamed Ocampo in honor of Don Julian Ocampo.

== History ==
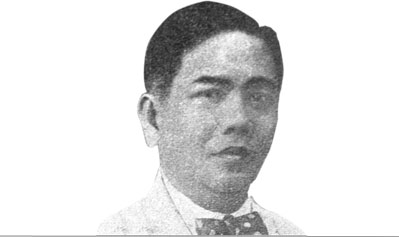
Don Julian Ocampo, former governor of Camarines Sur, is the namesake of the town.

The municipality of Ocampo traced its existence as the former "Mission de Mabatobato" launched by the Franciscan friars in 1735. The place was named "Mabatobato" because of the presence of huge rocks scattered all over the place believed to have erupted from Mt. Isarog. As a mission, it has four barrios; Ayugan, Tinablanan, Pinit and Moriones.

In the early 1800s, people from neighboring towns began to flock the area to settle and till the vast areas of lands suited for agriculture. The place began to flourish that the people began to dream of transforming the settlement into a new municipality. Cabeza de Barangay Michael Alcantara and Don Jose Barangbang requested and pleaded to the Bishop of Caceres to make the barrio into a town. The request was granted.

In 1917, Mabatobato was annexed to the municipality of Pili to help it recover from the Spanish–American War and for effective governance. By 1922 it was made into a new parish. Baptisms and burials were first recorded that year. The place began to flourish again and influx of immigrants from neighboring towns as well as from Batangas and Tayabas were observed.

After three decades, the leaders and the people of Mabatobato began to clamor for independence and to govern themselves once again. In 1948, during the incumbency of Congressman Sebastian C. Moll, Jr., 2nd District Camarines Sur, the dream to separate had been brewed. President Elpidio Quirino signed Executive Order No. 243 dated 15 July 1949 entitled: "Organizing Certain Barrios of the Municipality of Pili, Camarines Sur, into an Independent Municipality under the name of OCAMPO".

Mabatobato was renamed in honor of Don Julian Ocampo who was the Governor of Camarines Sur in the 1930s. Upon the appointment and qualification of the first municipal officials, Ocampo officially became an independent municipality on August 10, 1949.

== Geography ==
Ocampo is 14 kilometres (8.7 mi) from the provincial capital town of Pili and 464 kilometres (288 mi) from the country's capital city of Manila.

=== Barangays ===
Ocampo is politically subdivided into 25 barangays. Each barangay consists of puroks and some have sitios.

- Ayugan
- Cabariwan
- Cagmanaba
- Del Rosario
- Gatbo
- Guinaban
- Hanawan
- Hibago
- La Purisima Nuevo
- May-Ogob
- New Moriones
- Old Moriones
- Pinit
- Poblacion Central
- Poblacion East
- Poblacion West
- Salvacion
- San Antonio
- San Francisco
- San Jose Oras
- San Roque Commonal
- San Vicente
- Santa Cruz
- Santo Niño
- Villaflorida

=== Climate ===
Climate data for Ocampo, Camarines Sur
Month	Jan	Feb	Mar	Apr	May	Jun	Jul	Aug	Sep	Oct	Nov	Dec	Year
Mean daily maximum °C (°F)	33 (91)	32 (90)	35 (95)	37 (99)	38 (100)	36 (97)	35 (95)	33 (91)	35 (95)	34 (93)	33 (91)	32 (90)	34 (94)
Mean daily minimum °C (°F)	27 (81)	27 (81)	29 (84)	31 (88)	32 (90)	32 (90)	31 (88)	29 (84)	30 (86)	29 (84)	28 (82)	28 (82)	29 (85)
Average precipitation mm (inches)	36.66 (1.44)	58.6 (2.31)	37.91 (1.49)	76.31 (3.00)	98.34 (3.87)	151.99 (5.98)	288.39 (11.35)	291.41 (11.47)	186.77 (7.35)	363.21 (14.30)	97.5 (3.84)	292.1 (11.50)	1,979.19 (77.9)
Average rainy days	18	23	16	17	25	28	31	26	27	29	24	29	293
Source: World Weather Online

== Demographics ==
Population census of Ocampo
Year	Pop.	±% p.a.
1960	14,572	—
1970	18,757	+2.55%
1975	19,283	+0.56%
1980	24,794	+5.15%
1990	30,876	+2.22%
1995	34,898	+2.32%
2000	36,316	+0.86%
2007	39,759	+1.26%
2010	43,523	+3.35%
2015	45,934	+1.03%
2020	51,073	+2.26%
2024	49,535	−0.73%
Source: Philippine Statistics Authority

In the 2024 census, the population of Ocampo was 49,535 people, with a density of 420 inhabitants per square kilometre or 1,100 inhabitants per square mile.

=== Language ===
The Partido variant of Central Bikolano is the primary language spoken in the entire town. Riŋkonāda or Rinconada Bikol is spoken by a minority of the population, along with the Naga variant of Central Bikolano. Tagalog and English are also spoken and understood.

==== Isarog Agta Language ====
In 2010, UNESCO released its 3rd world volume of Endangered Languages in the World, where 3 critically endangered languages were in the Philippines. One of these languages in the Isarog Agta language which has an estimated speaker of 5 people in the year 2000. The language was classified as Critically Endangered, meaning the youngest speakers are grandparents and older, and they speak the language partially and infrequently and hardly pass the language to their children and grandchildren anymore. If the remaining 150 people do not pass their native language to the next generation of Isarog Agta people, their indigenous language will be extinct within a period of 1 to 2 decades.

The Isarog Agta people live within the circumference of Mount Isarog, though only 5 of them still know their indigenous language. They are one of the original Negrito settlers in the entire Philippines. They belong to the Aeta people classification, but have distinct language and belief systems unique to their own culture and heritage.

=== Religion ===
The religious groups in the locality are: Roman Catholic, Seventh Day Adventist, The Church of Jesus Christ of Latter Day Saints, Jehovah's Witnesses, Iglesia Ni Cristo, Word International Ministries and other groups of Born-Again Christians.

== Economy ==
Poverty incidence of Ocampo (%)

Source: Philippine Statistics Authority

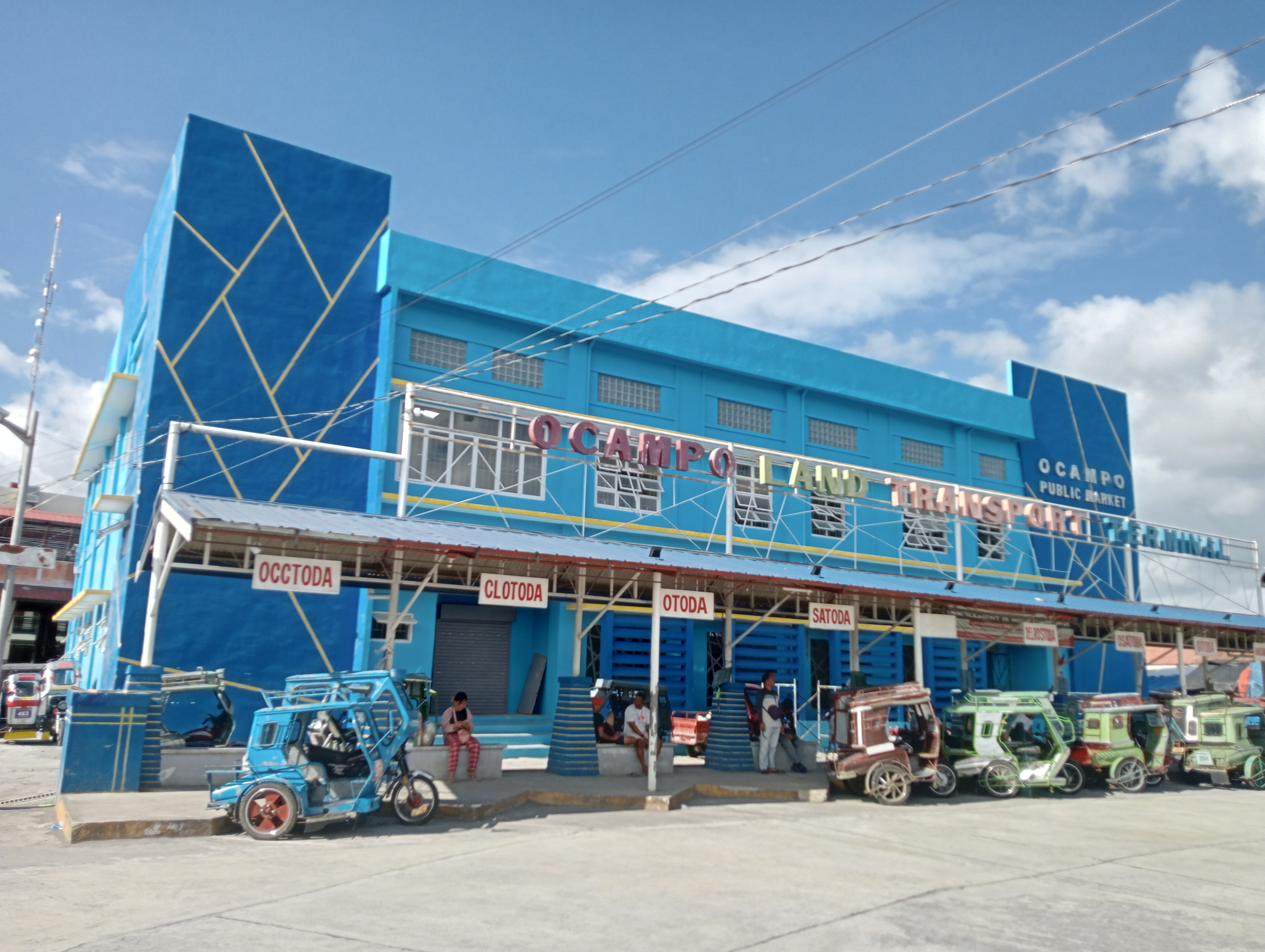
Ocampo Public Market & Terminal

Commercial establishments include internet shops, bank, pawnshops, hardware stores, groceries, drug stores, eateries, computer shops, bakeries, motorcycle dealers, agri-dealers, gas stations and several ricemills. Various businesses are sprouting.

Local products include palay, corn, root crops, sugarcane, coconut, and vegetables. Livestock and poultry products are also available.

CASURECO IV supplies power requirement in the town.

Ocampo was formerly included in the Metro Naga area before the designation was discontinued in 2017.

== Tourism ==
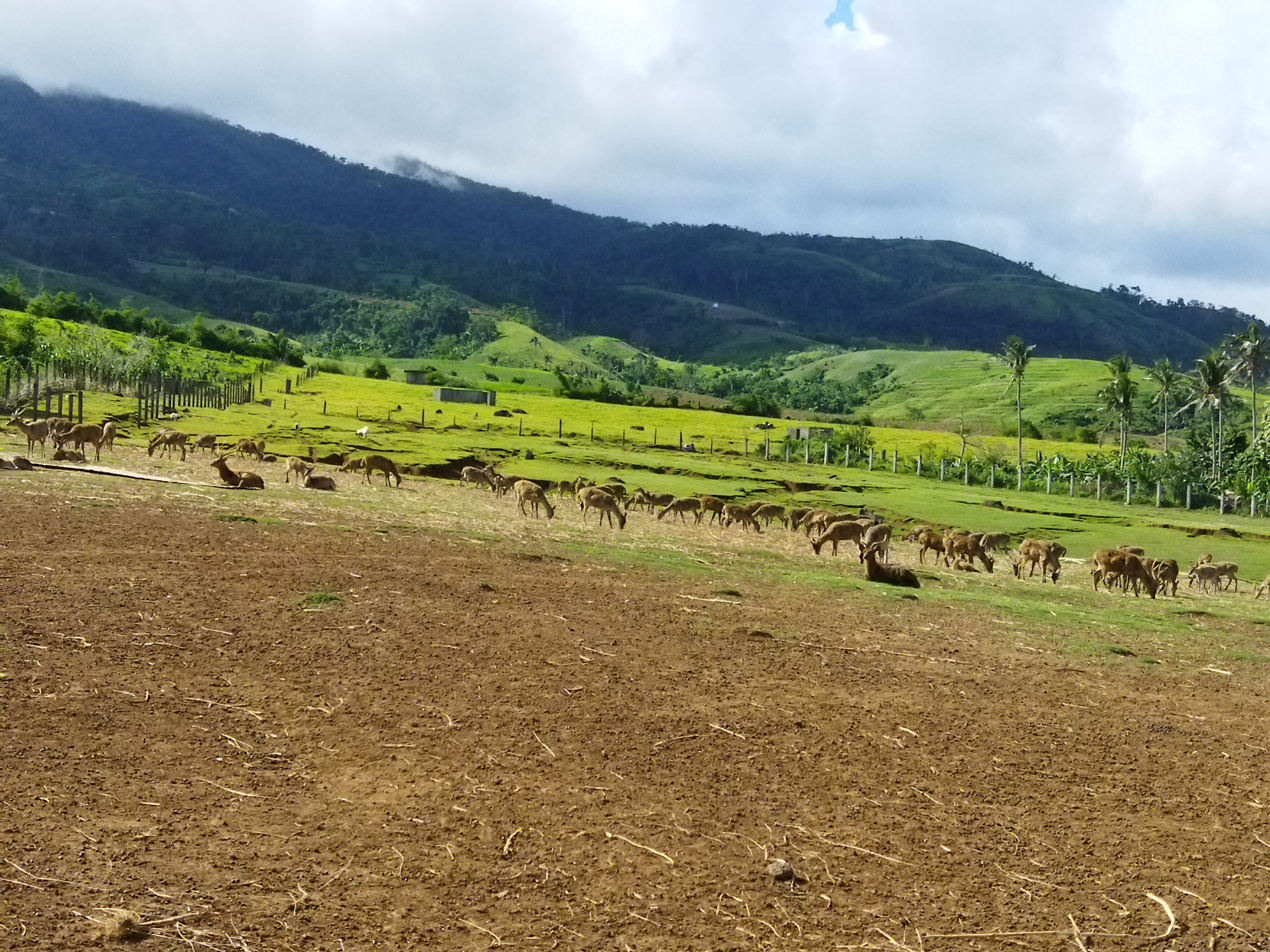
Deer farm in Ocampo

Tourist destinations include the province-owned: Ocampo Deer Farm in Barangay Santa Cruz, Bamboo Farm in Barangay Hanawan and Murokburok Spring in Barangay Gatbo. There's also Tera Mater Resort, the first resort in the town, located in Barangay New Moriones and a newly opened resort in Barangay San Antonio.

Ocampo Deer Farm is situated at an elevated area about four kilometers up in the forests of Mt. Isarog, in Barangay Santa Cruz, the 28-hectare reindeer farm is considered as the original reindeer farm of the Philippines. It was stocked entirely with Australian species such as Blackbuck Antelope, Fallow Deer, Chital Deer, Red Deer and Elk.

The farm was started late in 1996 with only 208 heads of five species from Australia. As of today, the number remains at 220 heads. Its goal was to make the province a supplier of deer meat (venison) which is a delicacy in class restaurants while the hides can be used as material for bags belts and other goods, and the antlers can be extracted for medicinal value.

Pacific Santa's Inc., founded by Santa R-Kayma Klaws, is entering an exclusive management agreement with the provincial government to micro-manage and promote the farm.

The Bicol Strawberry Farm owned by the Libreja family is found in Barangay Pinit.

=== Fiestas and festivals ===
The town fiesta of Ocampo is celebrated in the month August in commemoration of the town's patron saint, Saint Bernard Abbot. The only festival at Ocampo is the Himoloan Festival which showcases the locally produced products of the town. It is celebrated annually during the month of August a week before the town fiesta. During this time, various activities are done.

== Transportation ==
The town is the gateway to 4th District of Camarines Sur, and via Hanawan junction, Consocep falls northward and Iriga City southward. Accessible by land transportation, via National Highway going to Lagonoy, Camarines Sur. From Naga City, the easiest way to go to the town is to ride a bus going to Lagonoy from the Naga City Central Bus Terminal and disembark at Ocampo Poblacion bus stop.

== Education ==
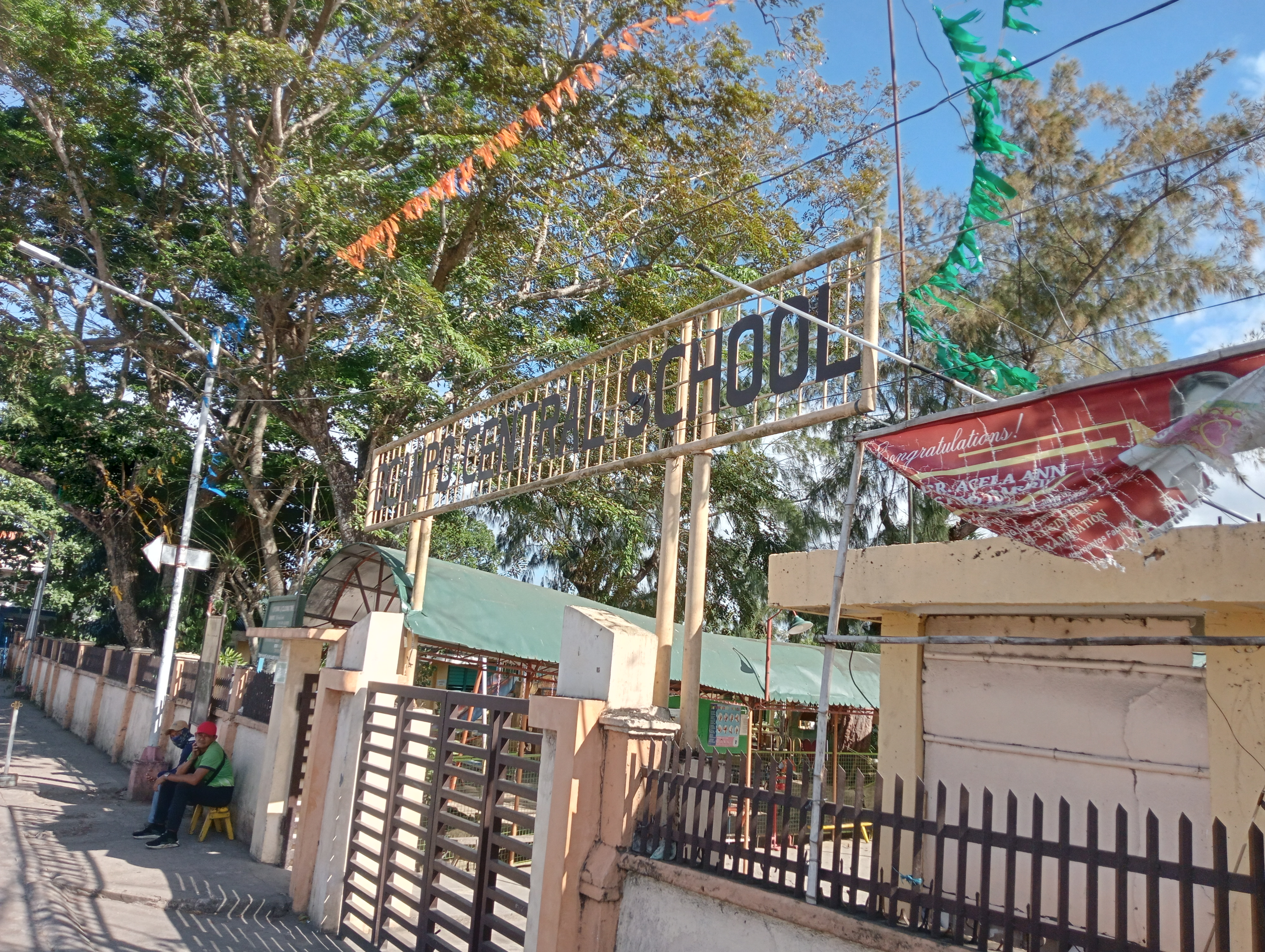
Ocampo Central School

The Ocampo Schools District Office governs all educational institutions within the municipality. It oversees the management and operations of all private and public, from primary to secondary schools.

=== Primary and elementary schools ===
- Ayugan Elementary School
- Cabariwan Elementary School
- Cagmanaba Elementary School
- Del Rosario Elementary School
- Gatbo Elementary School
- Guinaban Elementary School
- Hanawan Elementary School
- Hibago Elementary School
- La Purisima Nuevo Elementary School
- Little Blessings Learning Center School
- May-Ogob Elementary School
- Moriones Elementary School
- New Moriones Elementary School
- Ocampo Central School
- Ocampo Evangelical School
- Ocampo Holy Saviour School
- Pinit Elementary School
- San Antonio Elementary School
- San Jose Oras Elementary School
- San Roque Commonal Elementary School
- Santa Cruz Elementary School
- Santo Niño Elementary School
- Villaflorida Elementary School

=== Secondary schools ===
- Gatbo National High School
- Genesis Colleges, Inc.
- Hanawan National High School
- Ocampo National High School
- Malate-Olos High School

=== Technical and vocational schools ===
- IConnect Global
- Genesis Colleges, Inc.

== Notable personalities ==
- Kyline Alcantara - Filipino actress and singer
- Bugoy Drilon - Filipino singer

== Gallery ==
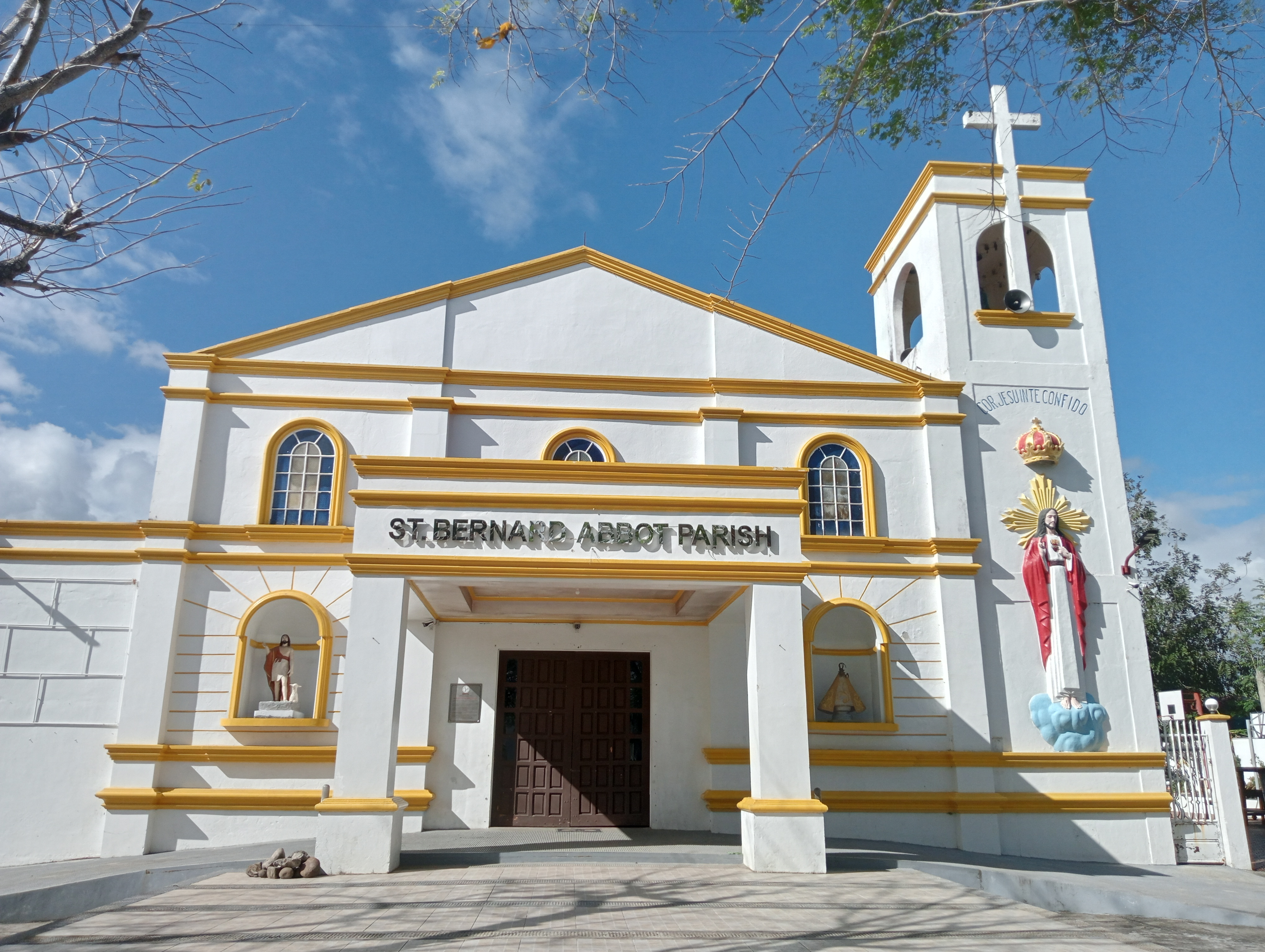
St. Bernard Abbot Parish Church

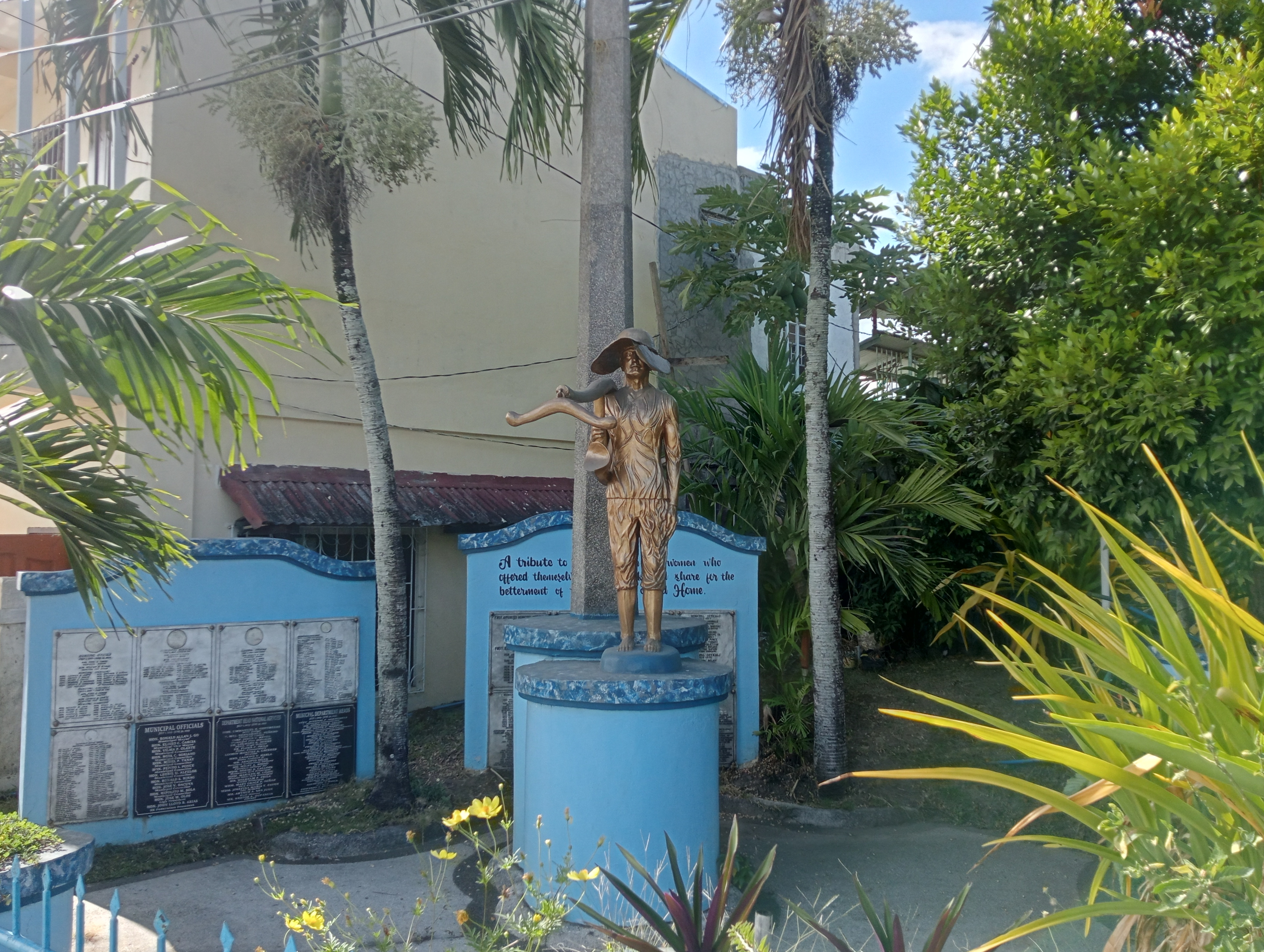
Ocampo Town Plaza

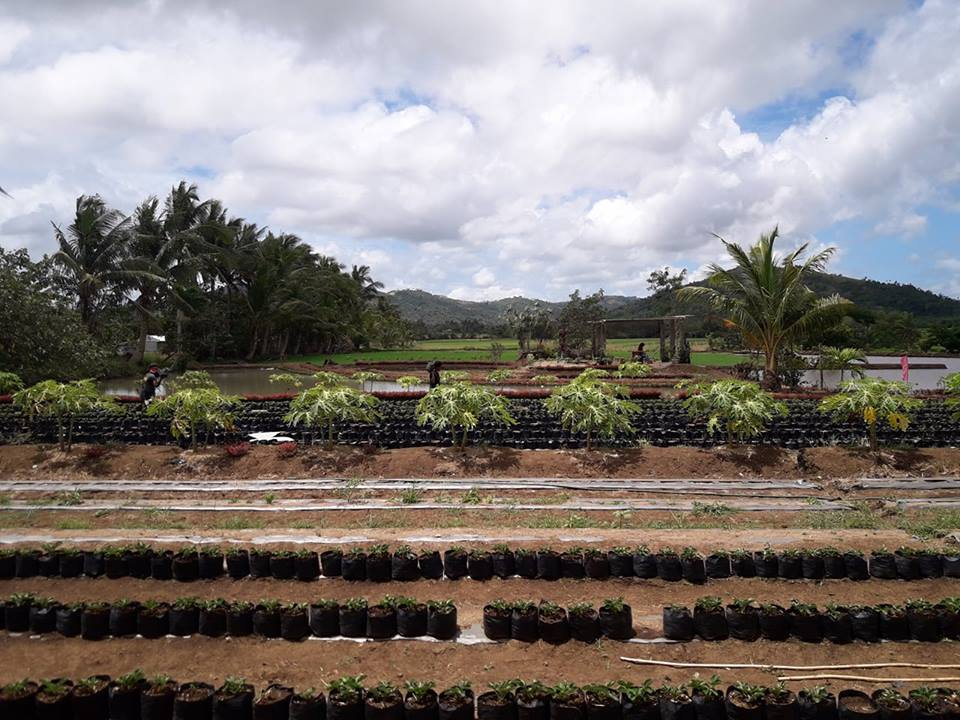
Strawberry farm in Ocampo

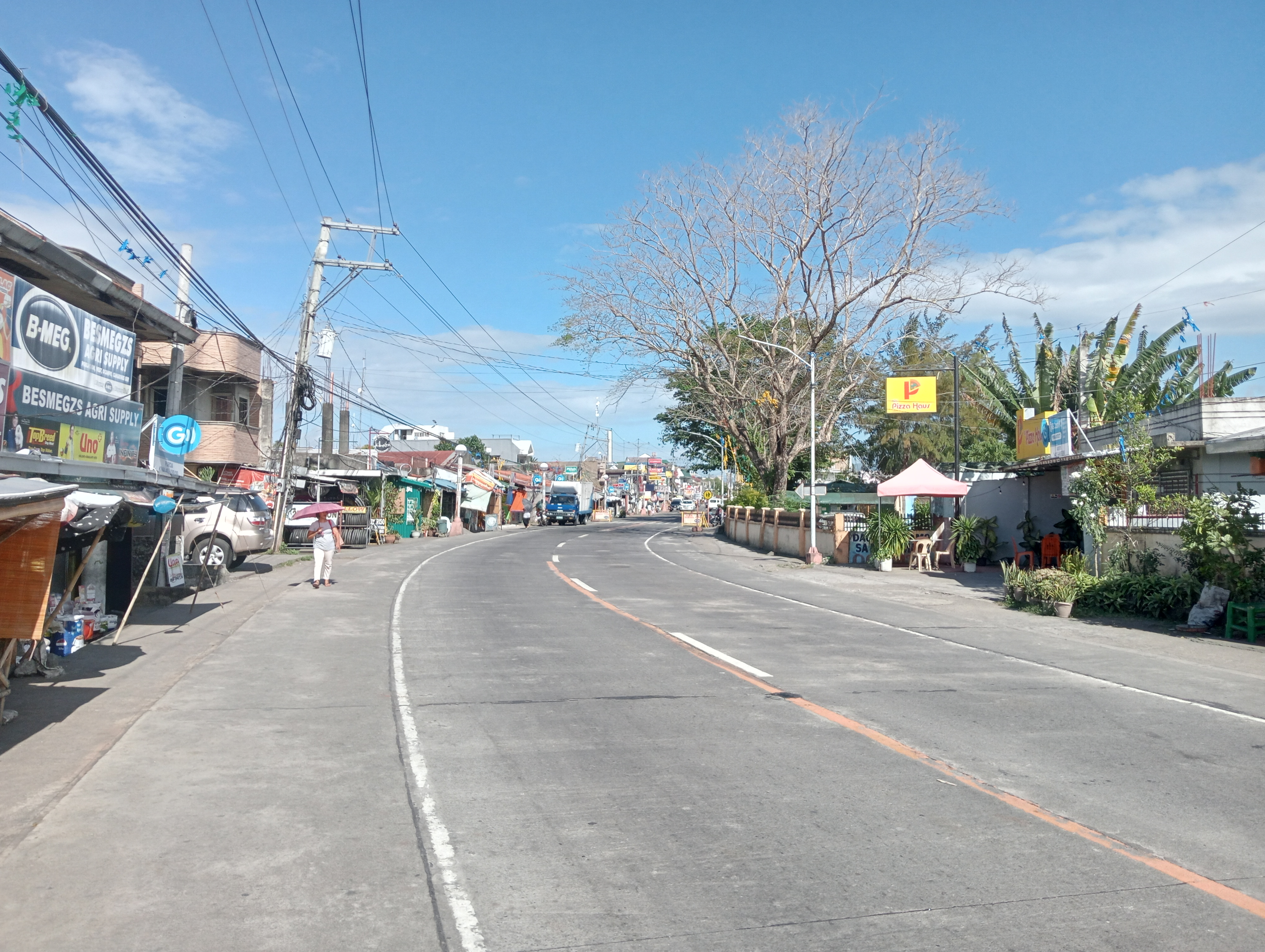
Gov. Jose T. Fuentebella Highway at Ocampo Town Proper

== See also ==
- List of renamed cities and municipalities in the Philippines
