= Pandan Bikol language =

Bikol language spoken in the Philippines

Pandan Bikol
- Native to: Philippines
- Region: Pandan and north-east Catanduanes
- Ethnicity: Bicolano
- Native speakers: (78,000 cited 2000 census)
- Language family: Austronesian: Malayo-Polynesian; Philippine; Central Philippine; Bikol languages; Pandan Bikol

Language codes
- ISO 639-3: cts
- Glottolog: nort2883

Pandan Bikol, or Northern Catanduanes Bicolano, is one of the three groups of the Bikol languages. It is spoken in Pandan and northeastern portion of Catanduanes.

== Examples ==
=== Wh-questions ===
- What? – anoha, ano
- Who? – sînoha, sino?
- Where? – siin, sin
- When? – sano?
- Why? – tâyon, akin, bakin, anoha ta, ano ta
- How? – paináno?
- How much? – mamila, amamila, apila, bagaano, tigpila, atigpila
- How many? – pila?
- Who are you? – sîno ka, sinoha ka
- What is your name? – anoha yan ngaran mo?
- When is your birthday? – Sano ka namundag? / Kaano ka namundag?
- Where do you live? – Siin ka ga-estar? Taga siin ka?

=== Animals ===
- Cat – kuting, kurasmag, kusmag
- Dog – ayam, gamadya, gadya
- Cow – baka
- Carabao – karbaw
- Pig – orig, tibos (male brooding pig)
- Rat – ilaga
- Ant – habon, amonggod
- Chicken – manok, mardos
- Lizard – tagaw
- Gecko – tuko
- Snake – haras
- Bird – iwata

=== Counting ===
- One – sado, uno
- Two – dawha, dos
- Three – tatlo, tres
- Four – apat, kwatro
- Five – lima, singko
- Six – anom, sais
- Seven – pito,syete
- Eight – waro, otso
- Nine – siyam, nuwebe
- Ten – sampuro, dyes
- One hundred – sanggatos
- One thousand – sanribo

=== Common adjectives ===
- Beautiful – magayon
- Ugly – pangit, kalain
- Hot – mainit, maaringahot
- Cold – malipot
- Good – madjag
- Bad – maraot, malain
- Great – matibay, maurag
- Sick – igakarudog, gakarudog
- Fast – maispid, apura
- Slow – maluway
- High – harangkaw
- Low – hababa
- Deep – hararom
- Wide – harapad
- Loose – haruga
- Narrow – siot, piot
- Heavy – magubat
- Dark – madurom, maitom
