= Southern Catanduanes Bikol language =

Bikol languages of the Philippines

Southern Catanduanes Bikol
- Virac
- Native to: Philippines
- Region: Catanduanes
- Native speakers: (140,000 cited 2000 census)
- Language family: Austronesian: Malayo-Polynesian; Philippine; Central Philippine; Bikol languages; Coastal Bikol; Southern Catanduanes Bikol

Language codes
- ISO 639-3: bln
- Glottolog: sout2912

Southern Catanduanes Bikol, or Virac is one of the Bikol languages of Catanduanes in the Philippines.
