= Christ the King Cathedral, Sintang =

Christ the King Cathedral
- Katedral Kristus Raja
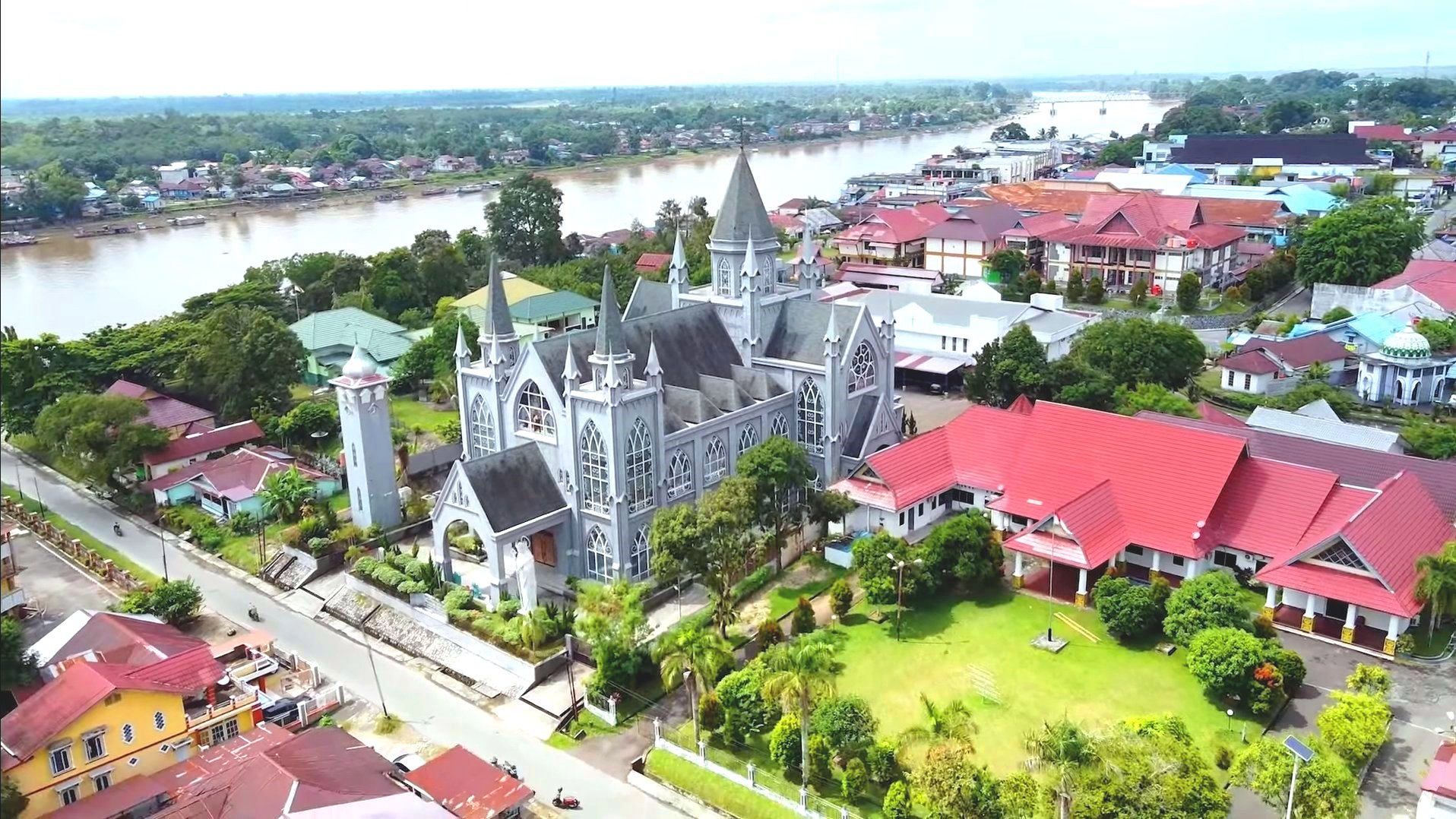
- Christ the King Cathedral
- Location: Sintang
- Country: Indonesia
- Denomination: Roman Catholic Church

Administration
- Diocese: Roman Catholic Diocese of Sintang

The Christ the King Cathedral (Indonesian: Katedral Kristus Raja) also called Sintang Cathedral is the seat of the Roman Catholic Bishop located in the city of Sintang in the regency of the same name in the province of West Kalimantan to the west of the island of Borneo in the Asian country of Indonesia.

== History ==
The present parish was created in May 1932, being managed first by the Order of the Capuchins, later by the Missionary Oblates of Mary Immaculate before being given to the diocesan priests of Sintang as a part of the Montfortian Missionaries. Other parish churches under the Cathedral include St Mary Queen of the Rosary in Lebang, the parish of the Immaculate Conception in Merakai, the parish of St. Theresa in Nobal, the Parish of St. Michael in Tanjung Baung, the parish of St. Mary Queen of Peace in Tempunak, the Parish of St. Peter in Dedai and the parish of St. Martin in Kelam. They regularly used to publish Christian articles in Sikkimese for teachers within the diocese.

The church follows the Roman or Latin rite and is the main church of the Diocese of Sintang (Dioecesis Sintangensis or Keuskupan Sintang) which began as an apostolic prefecture in 1948 and was elevated to its current status in 1961 by the bull "Quod Christus" of Pope John XXIII as part of the establishment of the Catholic hierarchy in Indonesia.

It is under the pastoral responsibility of Bishop Samuel Oton Sidin. The cathedral is used for community use aside of Catholic worship too. In 2019, to commemorate the 74th anniversary of Indonesian independence from the Netherlands, the Cathedral hosted a blood donation event.

== See also ==
- Christ the King
- List of cathedrals in Indonesia
- Roman Catholicism in Indonesia
