= Rozario Menezes =

Most Reverend Rozario Menezes
- Bishop of Lae
- Archdiocese: Madang
- Diocese: Lae
- Appointed: 10 October 2018
- Predecessor: Christian Conrad Blouin
- Successor: Incumbent

Orders
- Ordination: 4 November 1999
- Consecration: 15 December 2018 by John Ribat

Personal details
- Born: 30 August 1969 (age 57) Virajpet, Karnataka, India
- Denomination: Roman Catholic
- Coat of arms

Bishop Rozario Menezes, S.M.M. is the current serving bishop of the Roman Catholic Diocese of Lae, Papua New Guinea.

== Early life and education ==
Rozario was born on 30 August 1969 in Virajpet, Karnataka, India. He studied psychology and counselling at the International Institute of Integral Human Sciences in Montreal, Canada. He did his philosophical and theological studies at Pontifical Athenaeum Dharmaram Vidya Kshetram.

== Priesthood ==
On 31 May 1992, Rozario became a professed member of the Missionaries of the Company of Mary and was ordained a priest on 4 November 1999.

== Episcopate ==
Rozario was appointed bishop of Roman Catholic Diocese of Lae on 10 October 2018 by Pope Francis and consecrated by John Ribat on 15 December 2018.

== See also ==
- List of Catholic bishops of India
