= Diocese of Sintang =

Roman Catholic diocese in West Kalimantan, Indonesia

Diocese of Sintang Dioecesis Sintangensis Keuskupan Sintang
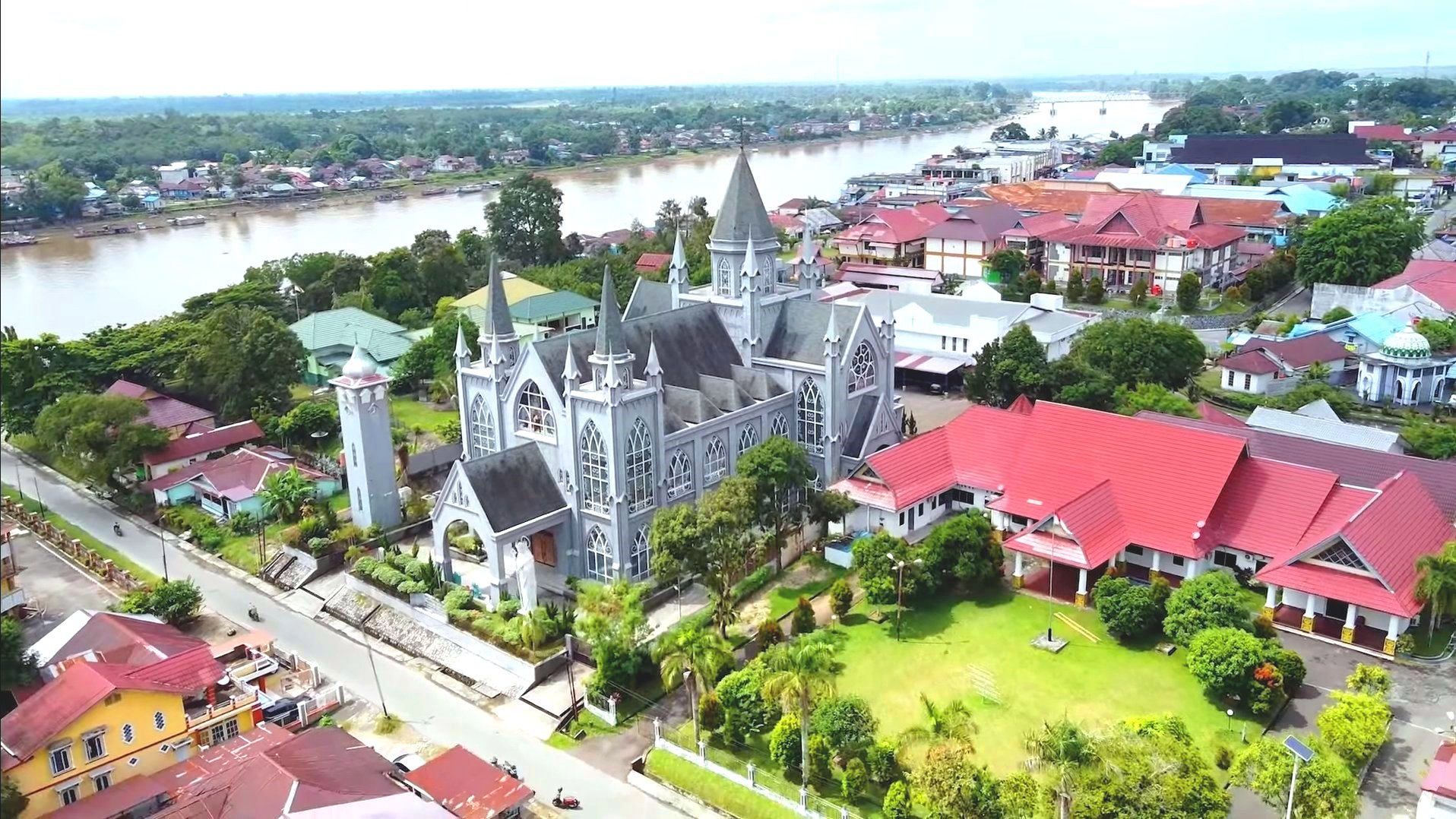

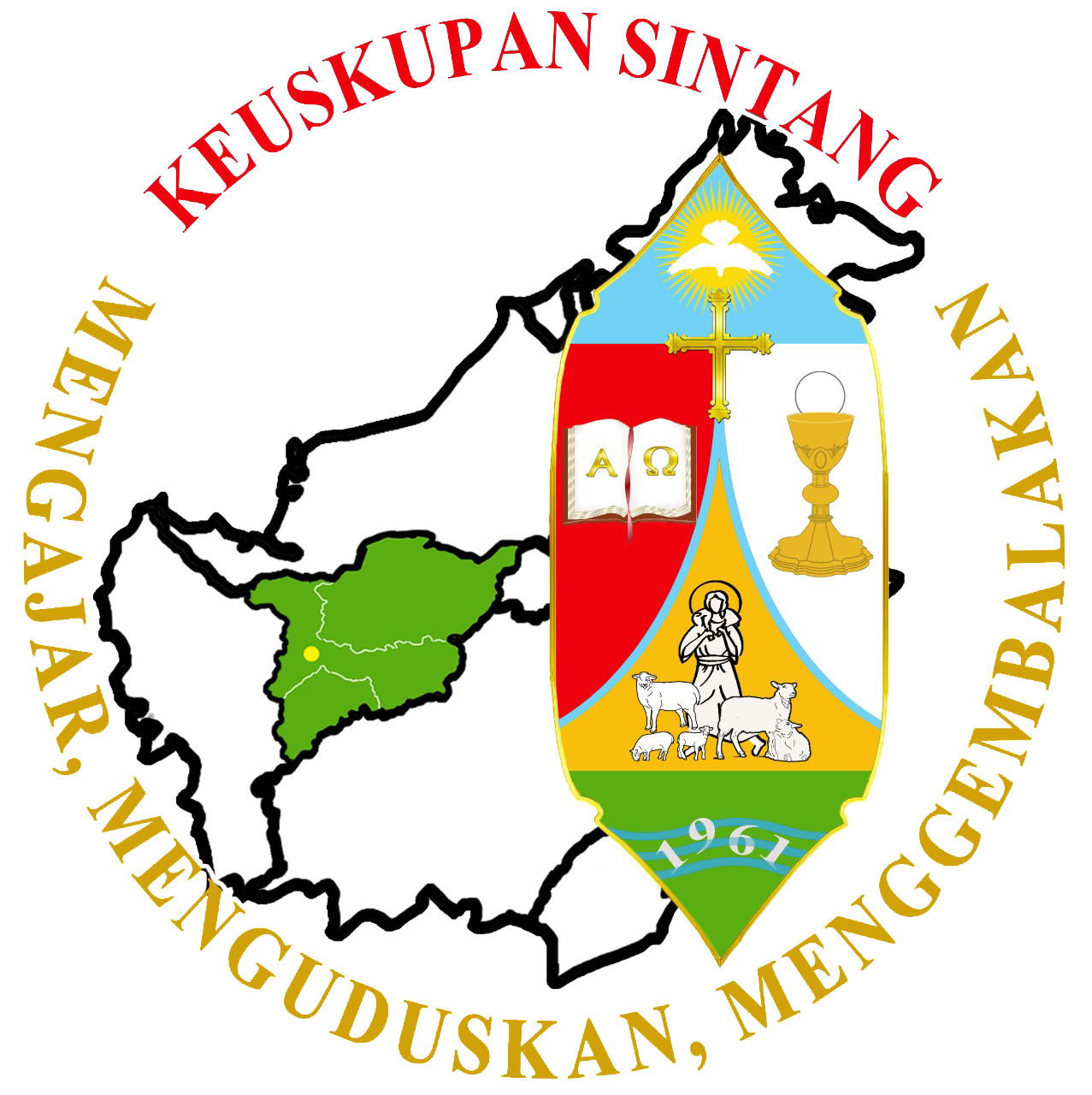
- Coat of arms

Location
- Country: Indonesia
- Ecclesiastical province: Pontianak
- Metropolitan: Pontianak

Statistics
- Area: 62,103 km^{2} (23,978 sq mi)
- Population: Total; Catholics: (as of 2023); 910,223; 267,250 (29.4%)
- Parishes: 37

Information
- Rite: Latin Rite
- Cathedral: Christ the King Cathedral in Sintang Regency

Current leadership
- Pope: Leo XIV
- Bishop: Samuel Oton Sidin OFM.Cap
- Metropolitan Archbishop: sede vacante
- Vicar General: Leonardus Miau

Website
- Website of the Diocese

The Roman Catholic Diocese of Sintang (Latin: Sintangen(sis)) is a diocese located in the city of Sintang in the ecclesiastical province of Pontianak in Indonesia.

== History ==
- March 11, 1948: Established as the Apostolic Prefecture of Sintang from the Apostolic Vicariate of Pontianak
- April 23, 1956: Promoted as Apostolic Vicariate of Sintang
- January 3, 1961: Promoted as Diocese of Sintang

== Leadership ==
=== Bishops of Sintang (Roman rite) ===
- Bishop Samuel Oton Sidin, O.F.M. Cap. (21 December 2016 – present)
- Bishop Agustinus Agus (October 29, 1999 – June 3, 2014); previously Apostolic Administrator (1996–1999); appointed Metropolitan Archbishop of Pontianak by Pope Francis
- Bishop Isak Doera (December 9, 1976 – January 1, 1996)
- Bishop Lambert van Kessel, S.M.M. (May 16, 1961 – May 25, 1973)

=== Prefects Apostolic of Sintang (Roman Rite) ===
- Fr. Lambert van Kessel, S.M.M. (later Bishop) (Apostolic Administrator April 23, 1956 – May 16, 1961)
- Fr. Lambert van Kessel, S.M.M. (later Bishop) (June 4, 1948 – April 23, 1956)
