= Rincon =

Rincon or Rincón (Spanish for corner) may refer to:

- Rincon (meadow)
- Rincon (abandoned meander)

== People ==
- Rincon (surname)
- Rincón (footballer, born 1977), born Gilvan Santos Souza, Brazilian football striker
- Rincón (footballer, born 1980) (1980-2013), born Claudiney Ramos, Equatoguinean football defensive midfielder
- Rincón (footballer, born 1987), born Carlos Eduardo de Castro Lourenço, Brazilian football centre-back
- Rincon (footballer, born 1994), born Rincon Teixeira da Rocha, Brazilian football forward

== Places ==
=== South America and Caribbean ===
Argentina

- Rincón, Catamarca, a town in Catamarca Province
- Rincón de Los Sauces, a town in Neuquén Province
- Rincón, Córdoba, a town in Río Segundo Department, Córdoba Province

Bonaire

- Rincon, Bonaire, a town on the island of Bonaire

Costa Rica

- Rincón de Sabanilla, a district in San Pablo canton

Dominican Republic

- Rincón, Dominican Republic, a municipal district in La Vega Province

Falkland Islands

- Rincon Grande, East Falkland

Panama

- Rincón, Chiriquí

Puerto Rico

- Rincón, Puerto Rico, a municipality
  - Rincón barrio-pueblo, a barrio of Ríncon
- Rincón, Cayey, Puerto Rico, a barrio
- Rincón, Cidra, Puerto Rico, a barrio
- Rincón, Gurabo, Puerto Rico, a barrio
- Rincón, Sabana Grande, Puerto Rico, a barrio

=== North America ===
Mexico

- Rincón de Romos, a town in Aguascalientes

United States

- Rincon (surfspot), at the beach along Rincon Point, California
- Rincon, California, an Indian Reservation on the East end of Valley Center, California
- Rincon, Riverside County, California, a ghost town within the Rancho El Rincon land grant
- Rincon Creek (Southern California), a creek that marks the boundary between Santa Barbara and Ventura Counties, California
- Rincon de Los Esteros, a Mexican land grant in the present Santa Clara County, California
- Rincon Formation, a sedimentary geologic unit in California
- Rincon Hill, San Francisco, California, a neighborhood and landform
- Rincon Island (California), an artificial island off Mussel Shoals (also called "Little Rincon") in Ventura County, California
- Rincon Oil Field, an oil field northwest of Ventura, California
- Rincon Parkway, the portion of California State Route 1 along the north coast of Ventura County, California
- Rincon Point (Santa Barbara County), a cape on the Santa Barbara Channel in California
- Rancho El Rincon (Arellanes), a Mexican land grant in present day Santa Barbara and Ventura Counties, California
- Rincon, Georgia
- Rincon, New Mexico, a census-designated place in Doña Ana County, New Mexico
- Rincon Mountains, a mountain range in Arizona
- Rincon School in San Antonio, Texas
- Rincon High School in Tuscan, Arizona

Cuba

- Rincón (Camajuaní), an agricultural settlement in Camajuaní, Villa Clara
- Rincón, Havana, a settlement in Havana; see List of town tramway systems in North America § Cuba

=== Africa ===
- Rincón (Morocco), a Mediterranean town in Morocco

=== Europe ===
Spain

- Rincón de la Victoria, a municipality in the Málaga province, Andalusia
  - CD Rincón, a football club located in the city
- Rincón de Soto, a village in the La Rioja community

== Other ==
- Chilean recluse spider, known in Spanish as araña de rincón
- Honda Rincon, all-terrain vehicle (ATV) made by Honda from 2003-present
- Rincon, the development code-name of Microsoft's Internet Explorer 7
- Rincon 1, a satellite built at the University of Arizona

== See also ==
- El Rincón (disambiguation)
