= José Alberto Rozo Gutiérrez =

Colombian Roman Catholic bishop (1937–2018)

José Alberto Rozo Gutiérrez S.M.M.
- Vicar Apostolic of Puerto Gaitán
- Church: Catholic Church
- See: Apostolic Vicariate of Puerto Gaitán
- In office: 22 December 1999 – 2 March 2012
- Predecessor: Vicariate established
- Successor: Luis Horacio Gomez González
- Other post: Titular Bishop of Arsennaria (1999-2018)

Orders
- Ordination: 19 August 1962
- Consecration: 19 March 2000 by Beniamino Stella

Personal details
- Born: 22 February 1937 Cáqueza, Cundinamarca Department, Colombia
- Died: 24 May 2018 (aged 81)

José Alberto Rozo Gutiérrez, S.M.M. (22 February 1937 – 24 May 2018) was a Roman Catholic bishop.

Rozo Gutiérrez was born in Colombia and was ordained to the priesthood in 1962. He served as Vicar Apostolic of the Apostolic Vicariate of Puerto Gaitán, Colombia, as a Titular Bishop of Arsennaria, from 1999 to 2012.
