= Rozo =

Rozo may refer to:

== People ==
- José Alberto Rozo Gutiérrez (1937–2018), Colombian Catholic bishop
- Marcelo Rozo (born 1989), Colombian golfer
- Rómulo Rozo (1899–1964), Colombian sculptor

== Places ==
- Rozo Point, Cholet Island, Antarctica

== Other ==
- Rozo FC, Turks and Caicos football club
- RozoFS, distributed file system
