= El Rincón =

El Rincón may refer to:

- El Rincón, Durango, Mexico
- El Rincón, Herrera, Panama
- El Rincón, Veraguas, Panama
- El Rincón, a neighborhood of Suba, Bogotá, Colombia

== See also ==
- Rincon (disambiguation)
