= Rinconada Bikol language =

Bikol language spoken in the Philippines

Rinconada Bikol
- Rinconada
- Pronunciation: /riŋkonɑːdɑ biːkol/
- Native to: Philippines
- Region: Bicol
- Native speakers: (230,000 cited 2000 census)
- Language family: Austronesian: Malayo-Polynesian; Philippine; Central Philippine; Bikol languages; Inland Bikol; Rinconada Bikol
- Dialects: Sinabukid; Sinaranəw
- Writing system: Latin (Rinconada Bicol alphabet); Baybayin (historical)

Official status
- Official language in: Regional language in the Philippines
- Regulated by: Komisyon sa Wikang Filipino

Language codes
- ISO 639-3: bto
- Glottolog: irig1242
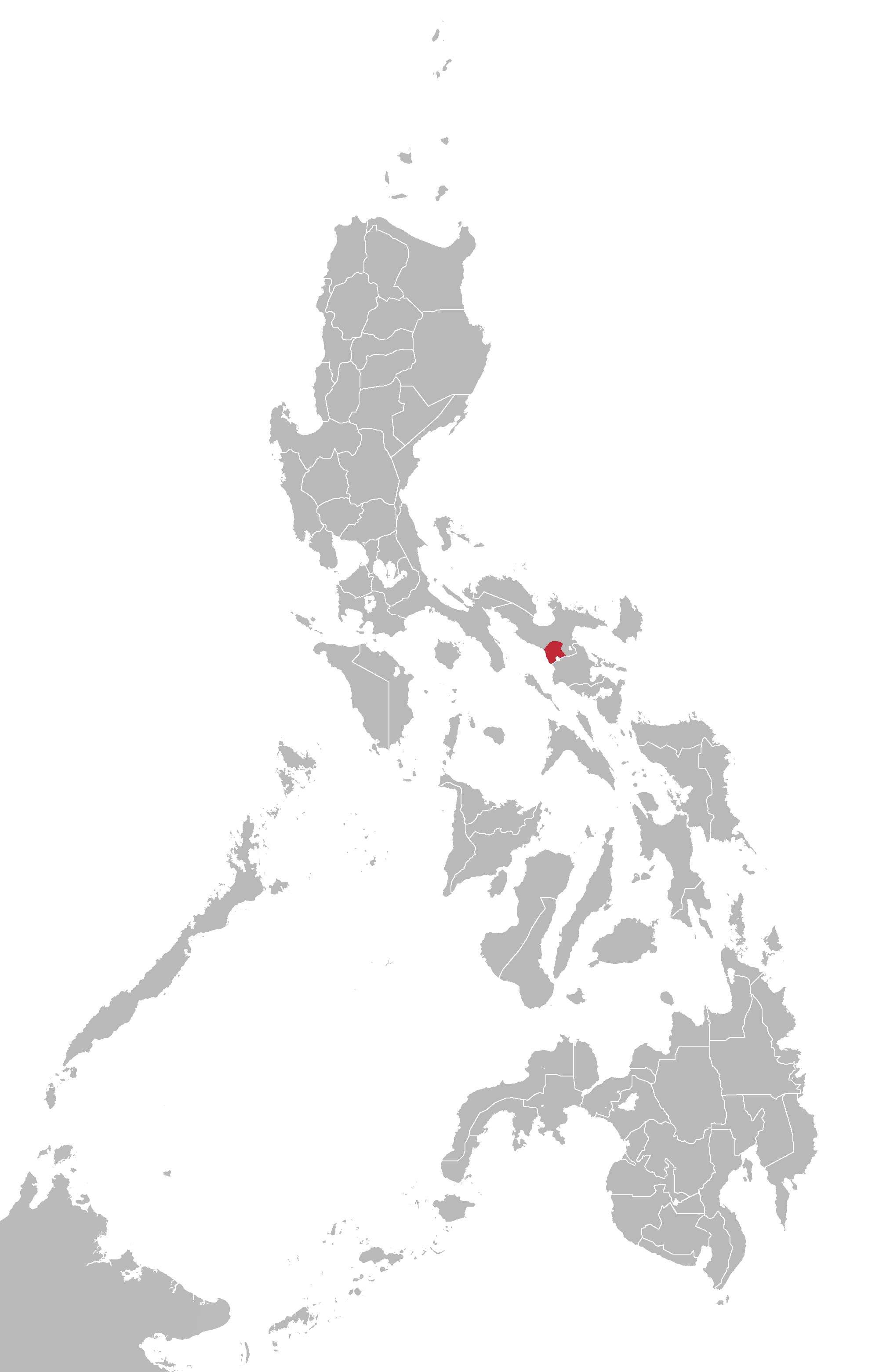
- Geographic extent of Rinconada based on Ethnologue

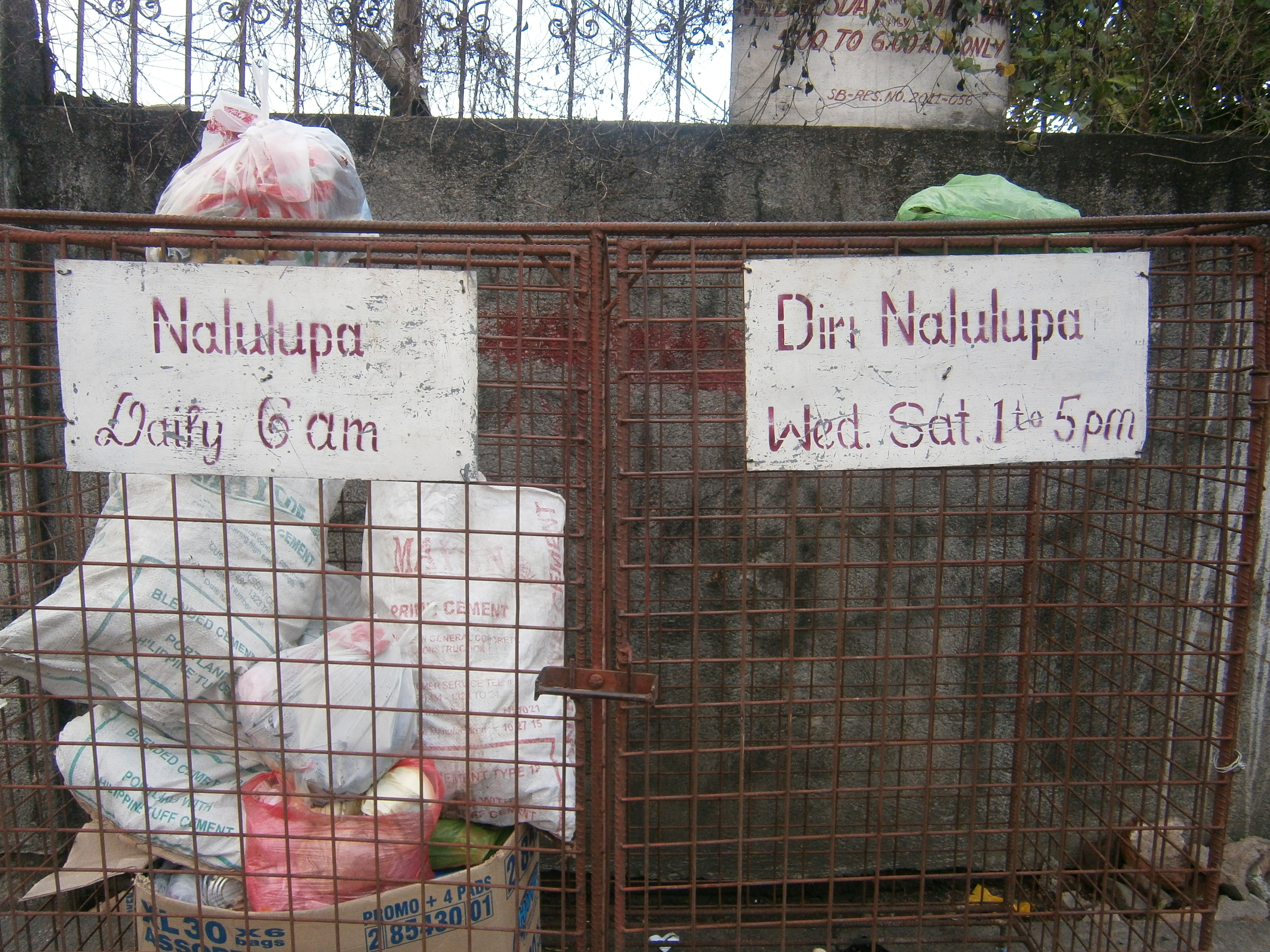
Signage in English and Rinconada in Baao; the Rinconada text means "biodegradable" and "non-biodegradable"

Rinconada Bikol or simply Rinconada, spoken in the province of Camarines Sur, Philippines, is one of several languages that compose the Inland Bikol (or Southern Bicol) group of the Bikol macrolanguage. It belongs to the Austronesian language family that also includes most Philippine languages, the Formosan languages of Taiwanese aborigines, Malay, the Polynesian languages and Malagasy.

Rinconada is surrounded by and shares common features with other Bikol languages. It is bordered by Coastal Bikol to the north, Buhinon to the east, and West Miraya language immediately to the south. The language's closest relatives outside the Bicol region are Aklanon, Waray-Waray, and to a lesser extent Tagalog, especially the variants used in Batangas and Marinduque.

Rinconada Bikol is also used by the indigenous population of Agta (Ŋod for camaraderie) in the surrounding mountainous areas of Mount Iriga (old name is Mount Asog) as most of them today are fluent in the language. The Austronesian people that have migrated to the foot of Mount Asog from lowland Nabua introduced the language to the Negritos when they began conducting trade and commerce. Consequently, it has become the native language of many, replacing their original language known as "Inagta". Also known to linguists as Mount Iriga Agta, it is currently considered an endangered language. Inagta is said to have 86% intelligibility with Rinconada Bikol and a lexical similarity of 76%.

== Name ==
5th congressional district of Camarines Sur

The name Rinconada is derived from the Rinconada District in Camarines Sur where the language originated, developed and is largely spoken. However, the precise origins of how the term Rinconada was assigned to the area are still unclear. Popular wisdom ascribes the name to have come from the Spanish arrinconada, 'cornered', from the root rincón, which means 'corner or small district'. Rinconada might have been given by the Spaniards to the then-newly explored and established colony in the southeastern corner of Luzon Island; natives formerly called the area Sumagang (Sumagaŋ), meaning 'far east'.

Adding credence to the theory of a Spanish origin are the localities of La Rinconada in Spain and La Rinconada in Chile, which was also a former Spanish colony.

== Dialects ==
The language is divided into two main dialects and subdivided into six variants:

=== Sinabukid (highland dialect) ===
(Strong accent, flat intonation only, and with /ə/)

- Agta variant
- Iriga variant

=== Sinaranəw (lakeside dialect) ===
(Soft accent with different types of intonation, and without /ə/)

- Nabua – Balatan variant
- Baao variant
- Bula – Pili variant
- Bato variant

=== Dialectal variation ===
Iriga variant Highland dialect	Agta variant Highland dialect	Nabua – Balatan variant Lakeside dialect	Bato variant Lakeside dialect	Baao variant Lakeside dialect	Bula – Pili variant Lakeside dialect	Central Bikol translation	Filipino/Tagalog translation	English translation
Namāmaɣəw iyā sadtō gilid ka sālog ku nabaretāan niyā na inarādo naŋgad ku igin niyā su ragâ, dāwâ ədâ pa ka tubig adtoŋ umā nirā.	Namāmaɣəw iyā sadtō iris ka sālog ku nabaretāan niyā na inarādo naŋgad ku igin niyā su ragâ, dāwâ ədâ pa ka katbag adtoŋ umā nirā.	Namāmaɣow 'yā sadtō gilid ka sālog ku nabaretāan niyā na inarādo naŋgad ku igin niyā su ragâ, dāwâ udâ pa ka tubig adtoŋ umā nirā.	Namāmaɣow iyā sadtō gilid ka sālog ku nabaretāan niyā na inarādo naŋgad ku akos niyā su ragâ, dāwâ udâ pa ka tubig adtoŋ umā nirā.	Namāmaɣow siyā sadtō gilid ka sālog ku nabaretāan niyā na inarādo jāday ku igin niyā su ragâ, dāwâ udâ pa ka tubig adtoŋ umā nindā.	Namāmaɣow siyā sadtō gilid ka sālog ku nabaretāan niyā na inarādo dayday ku igin niyā su ragâ, dāwâ udâ pa ka tubig adtoŋ umā nindā.	Namamahaw siya duman sa gilid nin salog kan mabaretaan niyang inarado giraray kan aki niya an daga, dawa dai pa nin tubig itong uma ninda.	Nag-aalmusal siya sa may tabí ng ilog nang mabalitaan niyang inararo mulî ng kaniyang anák ang lupà, kahit walâ pang tubig ang kaniláng bukirín.	He was eating breakfast by the river when he heard news his child ploughed the land again, even as their rice field had not water yet.

== Phonology ==
=== Consonants ===
Table of Rinconada Bikol consonant phonemes
	Bilabial		Alveolar		Post-alveolar/Palatal		Velar		Glottal
Nasal		m		n		(ɲ) ⟨ny, ñ⟩		ŋ ⟨ng⟩	
Stop	p	b	t	d			k	ɡ	ʔ
Affricate					(tʃ) ⟨ts, ty, ch⟩	(dʒ) ⟨dy, j⟩			
Fricative			s		(ʃ) ⟨sy, sh⟩				
Approximant		w		l		j ⟨y⟩		(ɥ)	
Rhotic				ɾ ⟨r⟩					

Notes:

- /ɲ/, /tʃ/, /dʒ/, and /ʃ/ are only found in loanwords, especially from Spanish.
- /ɥ/ is only found intervocalically between any of the vowels: /a, i, u/ and an /ɨ/. For example, ⟨pala⟩ + ⟨-ən⟩ = ⟨palaɥən⟩.

=== Vowels ===
Table of Rinconada Bikol vowel phonemes
	Front	Central	Back
Close	i ⟨i⟩	ɨ ⟨ə, ë, ö, ü⟩	u ⟨u⟩
Mid	(e ⟨e⟩)		(o ⟨o⟩)
Open		a ⟨a⟩	

Notes:

- /e/ and /o/ are only found in loanwords, especially from Spanish.
- /ɨ/ is only found in the highland dialect of Iriga city. Several related Inland Bikol languages also have the same vowel.

=== Diphthong (saɣəy) ===
Rinconada Bikol has several diphthongs or gliding vowels.

Rinconada Bikol diphthongs
-
[ja]	yamən	'play'	[aw]	balaw	'fermented shrimp or krill'
[je]	babayē	'woman/female'	[ew]	sigew	'spine'
[ji]	tayî	'stitch'	[iw]	isiw	'chick'
[jo]	payō	'head'	[ow]	aldow (Sinaranəw dialect)	'sun'
[ju]	tayû	'nice/pretty'	[uw]	taluw (Sinaranəw dialect)	'scared'
[jə]	yəkyək	'armpit'	[əw]	sabəw	'soup'
-
[wa]	īwas	'wide, spacious'	[ɤa]	labāɣan	'laundry'
[we]	suwê	'upside down'	[ɤe]	pondoɣē	'stop it, please'
[wi]	lāwig	'broad'	[ɤi]	lāɣî	'race, ethnicity'
[wɔ]	tawō	'human/person'	[ɤo]	kaɣon	'box'
[wu]	rawut (Sinaranəw dialect)	'locked'	[ɤu]	daɣun	'leaf'
[wə]	pāwət	'stressful'	[ɤə]	baɣəw	'cold cooked rice'
-
[aɪ̯]	maray	'good'	[oɪ̯]	kawoy (Sinaranəw dialect)	'wood/tree'
[ui̯]	baluy (Sinaranəw dialect)	'house'	[əɪ̯]	sabləy	'hang'

=== Diacritics (kul-it) ===
Rinconada uses a variation of the Latin alphabet modeled on the Tagalog alphabet. But unlike the modern Tagalog–Filipino, Rinconada retains and uses diacritics (kul-it in Rinconada Bikol and kudlit in Tagalog). This is to highlight the meaning of the words and to differentiate homonyms. In return, the diacritics provide Rinconada Bikol with a unique orthography among Philippine languages. Diacritics for this language are limited to the macron and circumflex which is unlike other languages, for example Vietnamese which has several. However, due to technical difficulties and a scarcity of resources, diacritics are sometimes not available. Thus, two Rinconada alphabets were created to meet the needs of the speakers: the native and the simplified. Both can be used at the same time depending on the situation, purpose and availability of resources.

=== Glottal stop (rəgsad) ===
The Rinconada name for the letter which represents the glottal stop is rəgsad. This can only be found in the native form of alphabet, and it is limited to final vowels or vowels at the end of a word. Rəgsad is represented by the circumflex ( ˆ ).

For examples of the glottal stop, consider the Rinconada words salâ ('wrong') and turô ('drop of water/fluid'), often simply sala and turo in the simplified alphabet and in Filipino and English orthographies.

- With rəgsad and kul-it, the translation of the phrase I love you in Rinconada is Payabâ ko ikā ('love me you' in word-for-word translation).

=== Alphabet ===
==== Native ====
The Rinconada native alphabet has six short vowels, six long vowels, and seventeen consonants, a total of twenty-nine letters representing all phonemes in Rinconada Bikol. A long or stressed vowel is written with a macron (a diacritic placed above a vowel). It also includes the velar nasal special character /ŋ/ that represents "ng". The native alphabet contains phonemes that are native to Rinconada, thus making it the standard Rinconada Bikol alphabet.

Majuscule Forms (also called uppercase or capital letters)
A	Ā	B	K	D	E	Ē	Ə	ə̄	G	H	Ɣ	I	Ī	J	L	M	N	Ŋ	O	Ō	P	R	S	T	U	Ū	W	Y
Minuscule Forms (also called lowercase or small letters)
a	ā	b	k	d	e	ē	ə	ə̄	g	h	ɣ	i	ī	j	l	m	n	ŋ	o	ō	p	r	s	t	u	ū	w	y

Example of a Filipino proverb written in the Rinconada native alphabet:

A dirî tattaoŋ maglīlî sa pinaŋgalinan, dirî makaaābot sa pig-iyānan. (Tagalog: Ang hindi marunong lumingon sa pinanggalingan ay hindi makararating sa paroroonan.)

Letter	Rinconada	English translation
A	aləp	hungry
Ā	ārak	to flaunt
B	bādô	dress/cloth
K	kamət	hand
D	dəlag	escape
E	erak	pity
Ē	kalē	canal
Ə	əŋət	angry
ə̄	ə̄lâ	sit
G	gab-ī	night
H	sahâ	offshoot
Ɣ	baɣog	feeds
I	ikā	you (singular)
Ī	īkaw	earring
J	tadjok	hit by a sharp pointed tool or thing
L	lətəw	floating
M	matā	eye
N	nəknək	small mosquitoes
ŋ	ŋipən	tooth
O	oroŋ	nose
Ō	ōmol; sōdô	a person who is not funny anymore; remote area or place
P	parəy	rice (unmilled)
R	rayô	far
S	saləg	floor
T	tagbâ	a method of harvesting using a bolo or knife
U	uran	rain
Ū	ūri	late
W	warak	scattered
Y	yabâ	love

Notes:

- Exceptions to the rules of the native alphabet are formal names like Juan Dela Cruz and placenames such as Laguna, Cebu and Manila. Those names must retain their official and simplified spelling instead of their native spellings Huwan Delā Krus, Lagūna, Sebū and Manīla. With the exception of names and places, all words in the native alphabet must be written with their respective spellings with their designated diacritics.

==== Simplified ====
The Rinconada Simplified alphabet is just the same as the Philippine alphabet. It has 28 letters:

Majuscule Forms (also called uppercase or capital letters)
A	B	C	D	E	F	G	H	I	J	K	L	M	N	Ñ	Ng	O	P	Q	R	S	T	U	V	W	X	Y	Z
Minuscule Forms (also called lowercase or small letters)
a	b	c	d	e	f	g	h	i	j	k	l	m	n	ñ	ng	o	p	q	r	s	t	u	v	w	x	y	z

The letters F, V and Z are included because they are native to other Philippine languages like Itawis and Ibanag. The letters C, Ñ, and Q are also included, but their usages are limited to foreign names, Filipinized words of foreign origins or loans, especially from Spanish, English and Arabic.

The simplified alphabet does not use diacritics like the macron ⟨◌̄⟩ for stressed and long vowels, the circumflex ⟨◌̂⟩ for glottal stop, or the letters for velar nasal ⟨ŋ⟩, schwa ⟨ə⟩, or velar fricative ⟨ɣ⟩, as they do not appear on a standard QWERTY keyboard. The velar nasal ⟨ŋ⟩ is replaced by the digraph ⟨ng⟩, and the two latter sounds can be replaced by ⟨o⟩ and ⟨h⟩, ⟨w⟩, and ⟨y⟩ respectively. Even with the absence of diacritics in the modern and simplified alphabet, pronunciations in the spoken language are not altered. Moreover, the long vowel sound in a word should not be omitted. One example is bə̄ət ('kind') and bəət ('want, like'). The word bə̄ət in the native alphabet is written as bəət in the simplified alphabet, making the two words the same in spelling albeit with different meanings. In this case, the pronunciation of the words depends on their place and usage in a sentence. To avoid confusion and aid in ease of reading, it is strongly recommended to use the native alphabet in writing Rinconada Bikol.

== Features and geographic distribution ==
- The Nabua-Balatan variant features high pitch intonation. It is the direct descendant of Rinconada Bikol but it has lost some features of the original spoken language. Speakers can be found throughout the municipalities of Nabua and Balatan.
- The Iriga variant, on the other hand, has the most speakers. The speakers are concentrated in the district's center, Iriga City, in some of the important barangays of Buhi (West and East Sta. Justina and De Los Angeles), and the urban barangay of Matacon, located in Polangui, Albay. The Iriga variant has a flat intonation and is spoken rapidly.
- The Bato variant, on the other hand, has a distinctive mellow intonation. It is said that regardless of one's mood, the Bato speaker always sounds sleepy, as if they are chanting. The Bato variant is primarily spoken in Bato, Camarines Sur and is also spoken in Agos, Polangui, Albay.
- The Agta variant is the smallest of the group. The speakers are exclusively the indigenous population of Agta/Aeta, the aboriginal people of different tribes surrounding Mount Iriga and Buhi lake. Like Iriga, the Agta variant also has a flat intonation; they speak the language with a distinct form of pronunciation which can be traced to the group's extinct language.
- The variants of Baao and Bula-Pili are considered twins. They have the same accent and only slight differences in vocabulary. Of the two variants, Baao often uses rising intonation, while Bula-Pili is moderately flat but both use high pitch when reasoning. The latter variant is used entirely in Bula and in the southern half of the provincial capital town of Pili. It also has a significant number of speakers in Ocampo and Minalabac in Camarines Sur. The two variants have borrowed some vocabulary from Coastal Bikol; at the same time, Bikol-Partido (a dialect of Coastal Bikol) can be heard with borrowed vocabulary from the two variants.

List of phrases and expressions that are unique to each variant:

Baao variant: Gaorag na!
Nabua – Balatan variant: Labinā kan.
Agta variant: Mayaŋ na ŋod.
Bato variant: Ay tarā?
Bula – Pili variant: Paiŋōrag.
Iriga variant: Labinā man nâ!

== Short imperatives ==
Like other Visayan and Bikol languages, Rinconada Bikol has a short form for the imperative.

e.g.:
The phrase iyəwən mo ('grill it') is often shortened to iyəwā and the command phrase punāsan mo a salmiŋ ('wipe the mirror') can be shortened to punāsa a salmiŋ.

A special form is used when talking to elderly people in a polite manner. The letters "ā/a" after the root word of the verb are replaced by the letters "e/ē" if the statement is politely delivered. The letter "e" or "ē" stands for tābî which means 'please' in English, or po in Tagalog.

Example 1:

iyəw is a root word that means 'grill'.
iyəwən means 'grill it'.
iyəwən mo roughly means 'you, grill it'.
iyəwā is the shortened form of the command 'iyəwən mo'.
iyəwē is the shortened polite form of iyəwən mo tābî ('grill it please').

Example 2:

punas is a root word that means 'wipe'.
punasan means 'wipe it'.
punasan mo roughly means 'you, wipe it'.
punāsa is a shortened form of the command punāsan mo.
punāse is the shortened polite form of punāsan mo tābî ('wipe it please').

Example 3:

īmo is a root word that means 'prepare'.
imōɣon means 'prepare it'.
imōɣon mo means 'you, prepare it'.
imōɣa is the shortened form of the command imōɣon mo.
imōɣe is the shortened polite form of imōɣon mo tābî ('please prepare it').

== Pronouns ==
	Absolutive	Ergative	Oblique
1st person singular	akō	ko	kanakə, saakə
2nd person singular	ikā, kā	mo	kanimō, saimō
3rd person singular	iyā, siyā	niyā	kaniyā, saiyā
1st person plural inclusive	kitā	tā	kanatə, saatə
1st person plural exclusive	kamī	namə, amə	kanamə, saamə
2nd person plural	kamō	ninyō	kaninyō
3rd person plural	sirā, sindā	nirā, ninda	kanirā, saindā, kandā

== Lexicon ==
=== Sentences ===
- What is your name? – Onō a ŋaran mo?
- My name is Joseph. – Usē a ŋaran ko. (Usē is a rinconadised form of Spanish José)
- Where do you come from? – Tagasārî ikā?
- I'm from Pili, Camarines Sur. – Taga-Pili, Camarines Sur akō.
- I love you so much. – Payabâ takā sa igô./Payabâ ko ikā sa igô.
- Do you like me? – Bəət mo 'kō?
- What are you doing? – Onō a ginigībo mo?
- I will go home. – Migpaulî na 'kō.
- John is my brother – Ŋod ko si Uwan. (Uwan is a rinconadised form of Spanish Juan)
- Do you want to eat breakfast? – Bəət mo na'ŋ mamaɣəw?
- I'm already eating – Nagkākaən na 'kō.
- What time is it?/May I know what time it is? – Onōŋ ōras na?/Onōŋ ōras na tābî?
- I will go out – Migluwas akō.
- I can't sleep. – Dirî akō makatorog.
- Are you afraid of the dark? – Nakatātakot ikā sa maŋitŋit?
- He said he will pick me up/fetch me. – Sabi niyā susuŋkātən konō 'kō.
- How old are you? – Gaamnō na ikā (naykā) kaguraŋ?
- When will you be back? – Kūnu ikā migbalik?

=== Family titles ===
- Amâ – father
- Inâ – mother
- Itay – dad
- Inay – mom
- Mānoy – older brother
- Mānay – older sister
- Tāta – uncle
- Nāna – aunt

=== Question words ===
- Onō – what
- Isay – who
- Kūnu – when
- Ŋātâ (Sinabukid)/Taōno (Sinaranëw) – why
- Sārî – where
- Paōno – how
- Arî – which
- Pirā – how many
- Mamirā – how much
- Gaamnō – indefinite question, used to describe the degree or extent to which something is covered, such as period or age, vastness or immensity, etc.

=== Greetings ===
General greetings:

- Maray na aldəw – Good day (from sunrise to sunset)
- Maray na gab-ī – Good evening (from sunset to sunrise)

The spoken greetings can be shortened to Aldəw and Gab-ī as they are similar to the two-syllable words bonjour and bonsoir of the French language.

Specific greetings:

- Maray na ramrag – Good morning (from 6:00 a.m. to 11:00 a.m.)
- Maray na mudtū – Good noon (from 11:00 a.m. to 1:00 p.m.)
- Maray na apon – Good afternoon (from 1:00 p.m. to 6:00 p.m.)
- Maray na gab-ī – Good evening (from 6:00 p.m. to 11:00 p.m.)
- Maray na lawəd – Good midnight (from 11:00 p.m. to 1:00 a.m.)
- Maray na mararamrāgən – Good dawn (from 1:00 a.m. to 6:00 a.m.)

People of Rinconada classify dim or dark hours as nighttime and light hours as daytime. As such, even with the introduction of modern standard time, they consider the hours of 12 midnight until 6 o'clock in the morning nighttime. Therefore, the general greeting from 6:00 a.m. to 6:00 p.m. is Maray na aldəw, and Maray na gab-ī for the hours that start from 6:00 p.m. to 6:00 a.m., e.g. Maray na mudtū tabî kaninyō ŋāmin!

Occasional greetings:

- Mamə̄yaŋ Pagkaməndag! – Happy birthday!
- Mamə̄yaŋ Bāgoŋ Taon! – Happy New Year!
- Mamə̄yaŋ Anibersāryo! – Happy anniversary!

== Uniqueness and distinction ==
The vocabulary of Rinconada Bikol is rich in words with short or unstressed /i/. In fact, most root words with /i/ are unstressed. However, not all words with /i/ should be read and pronounced as such since there are several words that have stressed /ī/, especially loanwords, e.g. sīli ('chili'). Native words (root words) with stressed /ī/ are seldom or rare.

The language retains the proto-Philippine schwa vowel /ə/ that has disappeared in most Philippine languages like Cebuano, Tagalog and even the neighboring Coastal Bikol language. In Nabua, Camarines Sur, (where the language is believed to have originated), the vowel also disappeared through normal development and evolution. However, it was preserved by those who moved and migrated to the highland part of Rinconada around Mount Iriga (formerly Mount Asog) due to severe flooding in the lowlands, particularly in Nabua and Bula, thus preserving the vowel which has survived to this day in the Sinabukid dialect.

People who are new to the highland accent may find the Sinabukid dialect sounds like Ilokano, Pangasinense, or Karay-a of Antique province. The vowel can also be heard from the population in towns and cities speaking the Albay Bikol group of languages. The native word for this vowel in Rinconada is gəpə, and this has divided the language into two dialects – Sinabukid or Highland (with /ə/) and Sinaranəw or Lakeside (without /ə/).

Aside from the vowel /ə/, another notable aspect of Rinconada language is the occurrence of the extra consonant phoneme /ɣ/. This consonant bears the sound of mixed letters "h", "y" and "w". The neighboring language of Buhinon also uses this sound - clear evidence of close ties between the two languages. This phoneme has neither a corresponding letter in the Philippine alphabet nor an equivalent character on the Philippine standard keyboard. Thus, Rinconada Bikol speakers have no option but to use "h" as an alternative letter. However, in the spoken Sinaranəw dialect, the consonant /ɣ/ and the vowel /ə/ are often replaced by the letters "w" and "o", respectively.

Examples of ⟨ɣ⟩

1. Mimaɣəw – 'will eat breakfast'
  (Mudtū na, mimaɣəw pa sanā ikā?)
2. Baɣəw – 'cold cooked rice'
  (Naŋagnəw na man na kānən na adī, malākabaɣəw!)
3. Taɣəp – process of separating rice from its outside layer after milling; tahip in Filipino/Tagalog.
  (A pagtaɣəp, əsad na gīboŋ dirî dāpat pinagdə̄dəlagan.)
4. Daɣun – plant leaf.
  (Kadakəl ka daɣun ka tanəm ni Tāta Isko.)
5. Taɣob – cover, protect, or conceal.
  (Pakarāyən mo a pagkātaɣob ka bobon ta mauŋkaŋ ikā sīton!)
- The special consonant phoneme /ɣ/ can easily be distinguished from the sound of letters "h", "w" and y" if it is placed before the vowel phoneme /ə/. It can be compared to the letter "j" in the Spanish phrase Dios Mamajes.

=== Pronunciation of ⟨e⟩ and ⟨ē⟩ ===
The letter ⟨e⟩ in Rinconada is not the typical pronunciation of the vowel /e/ in other languages - such as the word beg and bell in English, or the word metung in Kapampangan meaning 'one' - [ɛ] in IPA (open- or low-mid front unrounded vowel). The letter ⟨e⟩ in Rinconada is pronounced similar to the letter sequence ⟨ee⟩ in English, or the letter ⟨i⟩ of most languages, but the mouth is more open and the tongue is a bit relaxed. In IPA it is [e], a close- or high-mid front unrounded vowel. So its pronunciation lies in between that of leed's [i] and led's [ɛ].

The difference between the letters ⟨e⟩ and ⟨ē⟩ is that the latter pronounced longer or prolonged.

Example: mutēte (IPA: /muteːte/) - 'chide, scold'.

=== Rules for [j] ===
Unlike other letters in the Rinconada native alphabet, the letter /j/ is always accompanied by /d/ if it is in the middle of a word. Otherwise, single /j/ is used. Moreover, it is the only non-gliding consonant that cannot be found at the end of a word in native Rinconada vocabulary.

Some words in native Rinconada and Rinconadized words of foreign origin with /j/:

- jamantē – 'diamond' (from Spanish diamante)
- jāday – 'again, always'
- jāryo – 'newspaper' (from Spanish diario)
- jōlen – 'marble (toy)'
- pastidjō – 'nuisance' (from Spanish fastidio)
- idjəw – a large and non-venomous snake
- oodjon – no counterpart in English and Filipino (nearest meaning: 'jealous' or 'envious')
- sudjâ – 'prompted, investigated, an action for questioning'
- kadjapā – a thorny plant abundant in Bicol region, kulitis in Tagalog (scientific name Amaranthus spinosus)
- padjak – a bicycle converted into a tricycle, powered by human force (a mode of transportation known in Metro Manila as kuliglig)
- sodjaŋ – 'a sliver of wood, metal or bamboo in the skin'
- lokadjô – a word used to address a disliked person discussed in conversation; it is a word included in Bikol Angry Speech Register
- paŋadjî – 'prayer'

=== The consonant [h] ===
Through language evolution, Rinconada Bikol almost lost the phoneme /h/, hence it is rare. It is often absent in most Rinconada words that are usually present in other Philippine languages.

There is no real /h/ sound in Rinconada. It is either silent or glided and sounds like a long tonal vowel, or vowel lengthening. The letter /h/ is omitted since it is silent; on the other hand, it is glided when in between vowels. The Tagalog words such as hangin, higop and hanggan are almost the same as the Rinconada words, but the letter [h] is eliminated since it is not pronounced. The corresponding equivalents are aŋin, igop and aŋgan; the same is the case with other Bikol words like harani, harayo, and habo, which are arāni, arayô, and abə in Rinconada, while the glided /h/ sound can be found in between the same vowels as in baha, saha, kohol, and mohon.

The disappearance of the phoneme [h] is an occurrence comparable (though not to the same degree) to that in the Kapampangan language. Nevertheless, Rinconada Bikol speakers can pronounce it with clarity and emphasis whenever they speak other languages where it is present.

== Vocabulary ==
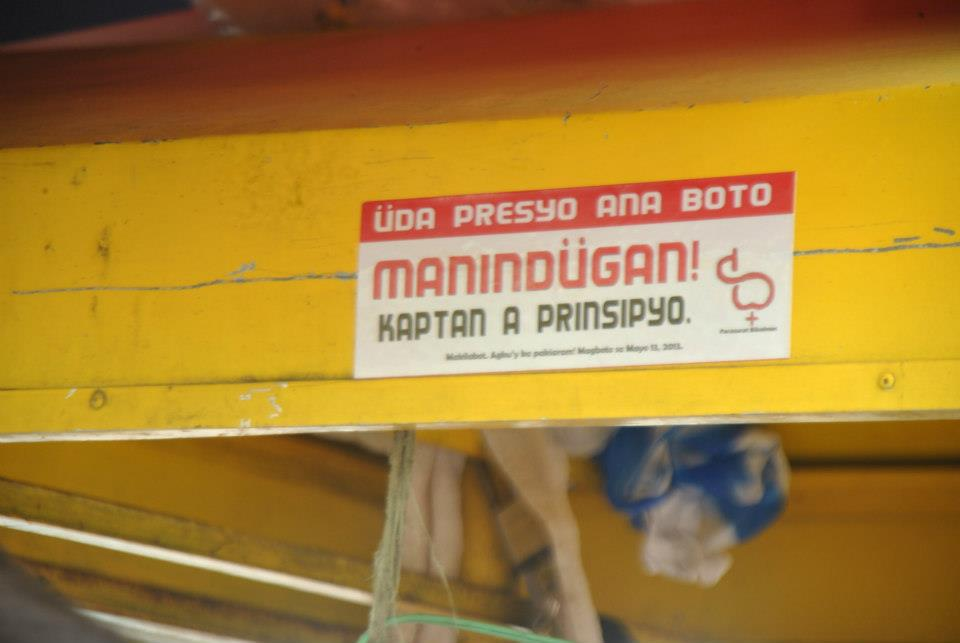
An election campaign sticker in Rinconada Bikol written in simplified alphabet. (Note the use of umlaut (ü) instead of the schwa vowel ⟨ə⟩ to aid the Sinaranəw speakers in reading the message.)

For centuries under Spanish rule, Rinconada adopted many words from Spanish. There are a considerable number of Latin loans (sometimes obscured by being subject to Rinconada phonology and grammar), for example: estar ('address or dwelling place', from estar meaning 'stay'), soltēro ('single' but only applicable to male individuals, from soltero), ɣūben ('young' from joven), and ilyābe ('key', from llave).

Older generations tend to use Spanish loanwords more often while younger generations tend to use Tagalog words and rinconadized words from English, especially modern terminology with no counterpart in native Rinconada Bikol vocabulary.

Example:

Bawas-bawāsan mo man ŋanî a pagkātiŋ mo lalô na kin arāni na a eksam. ('Limit your habit of escaping class sessions especially when examination is approaching near').

The Tagalog word bawas-bawāsan is inâ-ināan in Rinconada and the word lalô is used in favor of the native word orog. The words kātiŋ and eksam are rinconadized words of the English cutting (cutting classes or leaving the room during school hours without permission), and exam (examination) respectively. However, the native word for cutting classes is ləəm.

== Angry speech register ==
The angry register is unique to Bicol languages as it cannot be found in other Austronesian languages inside and outside the Philippines. It is generally used only among same-age speakers or by older speakers to younger listeners, as usage by younger speakers in addressing their elders would constitute great disrespect. On occasion, the angry register is used in sarcasm or humor, but the majority of its usage is in anger.

Rinconada Bikol has contributed much to this unique feature of spoken Bicolano languages.

Examples:

	Normal Register	Angry Register Sinabukid pronunciation	Angry Register Sinaranəw pronunciation
eye	matā	malsək	malsok
clothing	badô	lamakdô	lamakdô
eat	kaən	ablô, gətək	ablô, gotok
mouth	ŋaŋā	ŋurāpak	ŋurāpak
sleep	torog	tusmag	tusmag
drink	inom	til-ab, lablab	til-ab, lablab
child	igin	wagə̂	wagû
chicken	manok	soltok, galtok	soltok, galtok
dog	ayam	damāyə̂	daŋab, damāyô
throw	baribad	barambaŋ	barambaŋ
mountain	bukid	luskid	luskid
run	dalagan	kurībaw	kurībaw
water	tubig	kal-eg	kal-eg
rain	uran	dunag	dunag
rice	bəgas	lasgas	lasgas
hungry	aləp	gəsləp, gəlsək	guslup, gulsuk
woman	babayī	babaknit, siknit	babaknit, siknit
ear	taliŋā	taliŋəgŋəg	taliŋogŋog
old	guraŋ	gusnab, gusgus	gusnab, gusgus

== Sainigin ==
Sainigin is a select vocabulary for babies and newborns. It is used by parents to communicate with their babies easily and to train them how to talk, hence, an introductory language. It is often described as language for babies and commonly called sainigin or "baby talk". Words are limited to two syllables and feature basic commands. Several letters are absent such as "r", "g", "s", "j", and "h". Sainigin literally means 'talking or acting like a baby'.

Normal words	Sainigin words	English equivalent
inom	māmam	drink
kaən	pāpâ	eat
ə̄la	lālâ	sit
atî	āâ	dirty
ədə̂	dōdô	bowel
bādô	dādô	cloth
turog	nānok	sleep
wāwâ	kakâ	spit it out
tabid, īyî	wīwî	urinate
ədâ na	nāna	no more
erak	wāwa	pity

== Numerals ==
Numbers and words (in the native alphabet) are as follows:

0	pōlô																		
1	əsad	11	samsad	21	darwamsad	31	tolomsad	41	pamsad	51	limamsad	61	nəmsad	71	pitomsad	81	walomsad	91	yamsad
2	darwā	12	samdarwā	22	darwamdarwā	32	tolomdarwā	42	pamdarwā	52	limamdarwā	62	nəmdarwā	72	pitomdarwā	82	walomdarwā	92	yamdarwā
3	tolō	13	samtolō	23	darwamtolō	33	tolomtolō	43	pamtolō	53	limamtolō	63	nəmtolō	73	pitomtolō	83	walomtolō	93	yamtolō
4	əpat	14	sampat	24	darwampat	34	tolompat	44	pampat	54	limampat	64	nəmpat	74	pitompat	84	walompat	94	yampat
5	limā	15	samlimā	25	darwamlimā	35	tolomlimā	45	pamlimā	55	limamlimā	65	nəmlimā	75	pitomlimā	85	walomlimā	95	yamlimā
6	ənəm	16	samnəm	26	darwamnəm	36	tolomnəm	46	pamnəm	56	limamnəm	66	nəmnəm	76	pitomnəm	86	walomnəm	96	yamnəm
7	pitō	17	sampitō	27	darwampitō	37	tolompitō	47	pampitō	57	limampitō	67	nəmpitō	77	pitompitō	87	walompitō	97	yampitō
8	walō	18	samwalō	28	darwamwalō	38	tolomwalō	48	pamwalō	58	limamwalō	68	nəmwalō	78	pitomwalō	88	walomwalō	98	yamwalō
9	siyam	19	samsiyam	29	darwamsiyam	39	tolomsiyam	49	pamsiyam	59	limamsiyam	69	nəmsiyam	79	pitomsiyam	89	walomsiyam	99	yamsiyam
10	sampōlô	20	darwampōlô	30	tolompōlô	40	pampōlô	50	limampōlô	60	nəmpōlô	70	pitompōlô	80	walompōlô	90	yampōlô	100	saŋgatos

There are no written records to indicate that Rinconada has native words for two-digit numbers (11–99). On the other hand, there is also no proof that the language has no indigenous words for those numbers. It is intriguing that Rinconada has native words for three-digit numbers (e.g. sanggatos for 100) but not for two-digit numbers. Utilization and adaptation of foreign terminology during the 333 years of Spanish colonization could be one of the reasons why the native terminology may not have been passed to the new generations. Noting that an established language needs a complete numbering system in words, thus the reconstruction of words for 11 to 99 is necessary but needs to follow and retain the indigenous or original structural form of Rinconada's orthography.

=== Structure ===
The number words for 1 to 10 and 100 are all native Rinconada while numbers 11 to 99 are all reconstructed. However, the reconstructed numbers are based on the original structure. Sampōlô (number ten) or sampu in Tagalog is the only two-digit number that has a native word with a perfect indigenous structural form. The evolution of the word sampōlô from əsadnapōlô follows the orthography of Rinconada and developed naturally over the years. Being said, it is imperative that all reconstructed numbers must follow the same format of the number 10.

The word sampōlô is derived from a portmanteau of the words əsad + na + pōlô (əsadnapōlô) which is the based tenth of one. In the evolution of this number, the schwa letter ⟨ə⟩ of əsadnapōlô became silent and so the word became sadnapōlô. As with other Philippine languages, /na/ became /ŋ/, replacing the last consonant of the first word (which is /d/), and became the connector to the second word (which is pōlô) – thus, /d/ was omitted and the word became saŋ. The connector /ŋ/ becomes /m/ naturally if the next letter is /p/ or /b/, which is also the case in other Philippine languages. The word thus became sampōlô.

Structure of sampōlô (10):

1. əsad + na + pōlô = əsadnapōlô
2. əsadnapōlô – /ə/ = sadnapōlô
3. sadnapōlô – /d/ = sanapōlô
4. /na/ replaced by /ŋ/ = saŋpōlô
5. /ŋ/ replaced by /m/ before /p/ = sampōlô.

From sampōlô, all two-digit numbers were given a name that was copied from it. The numbers 40 (pampōlô) and 60 (nəmpōlô) follow the same pattern as sampōlô. The exception to the naming system of numbers is the number zero (0). Though zero (0) is a single digit, there is no native word for it. Since sampōlô (10) is a combination of 1 and 0, the word pōlô was taken from it to represent zero (0) rather than using sīro or sēro. As a result, Rinconada has a complete basic set of numbers without using foreign words.

The number referenced in Php 356,817,142,590 can be translated into Rinconada Bikol as:

Toloŋgatos limamnəm na bilyon, waloŋgatos sampitoŋ milyon, saŋgatos pamdarwaŋ rībo ag limaŋgatos yampōloŋ pīso.

In English it is:

'Three hundred fifty six billion, eight hundred seventeen million, one-hundred forty two thousand and five hundred ninety pesos'.

In Filipino it is:

Tatlong daan limampu't anim na bilyon, walong daan at labing pitong milyon, sandaan at apatnapu't dalawang libo at limang raan siyamnapung piso.

- Rinconada numbers in words are very simple in structure. Translations are shorter than both Filipino and English languages.

=== Comparison chart ===
Decimal Numbers	1	2	3	4	5	6	7	8	9	10
PAN, circa 4000 BC	*isa	*DuSa	*telu	*Sepat	*lima	*enem	*pitu	*walu	*Siwa	*puluq
Tagalog	isá	dalawá	tatló	ápat	limá	ánim	pitó	waló	siyám	sampu
Cebuano	usá	duhá	tuló	upat	limá	unom	pitó	waló	siyám	napulu
Rinconada	əsad	darwā	tolō	əpat	limā	ənəm	pitō	walō	siyam	sampōlô
Chamorro	maisa, håcha	hugua	tulu	fatfat	lima	gunum	fiti	guålu	sigua	månot, fulu
Malay	satu	dua	tiga	empat	lima	enam	tujuh	lapan	sembilan	sepuluh
Javanese	siji	loro	telu	papat	limo	nem	pitu	wolu	songo	sepuluh
Tongan	taha	ua	tolu	fā	nima	ono	fitu	valu	hiva	-fulu
Samoan	tasi	lua	tolu	fā	lima	ono	fitu	valu	iva	sefulu
Māori	tahi	rua	toru	whā	rima	ono	whitu	waru	iwa	tekau (archaic: ngahuru)
Marquesan	e tahi	e 'ua	e to'u	e fa	e 'ima	e ono	e fitu	e va'u	e iva	'onohu'u

== Intelligibility ==
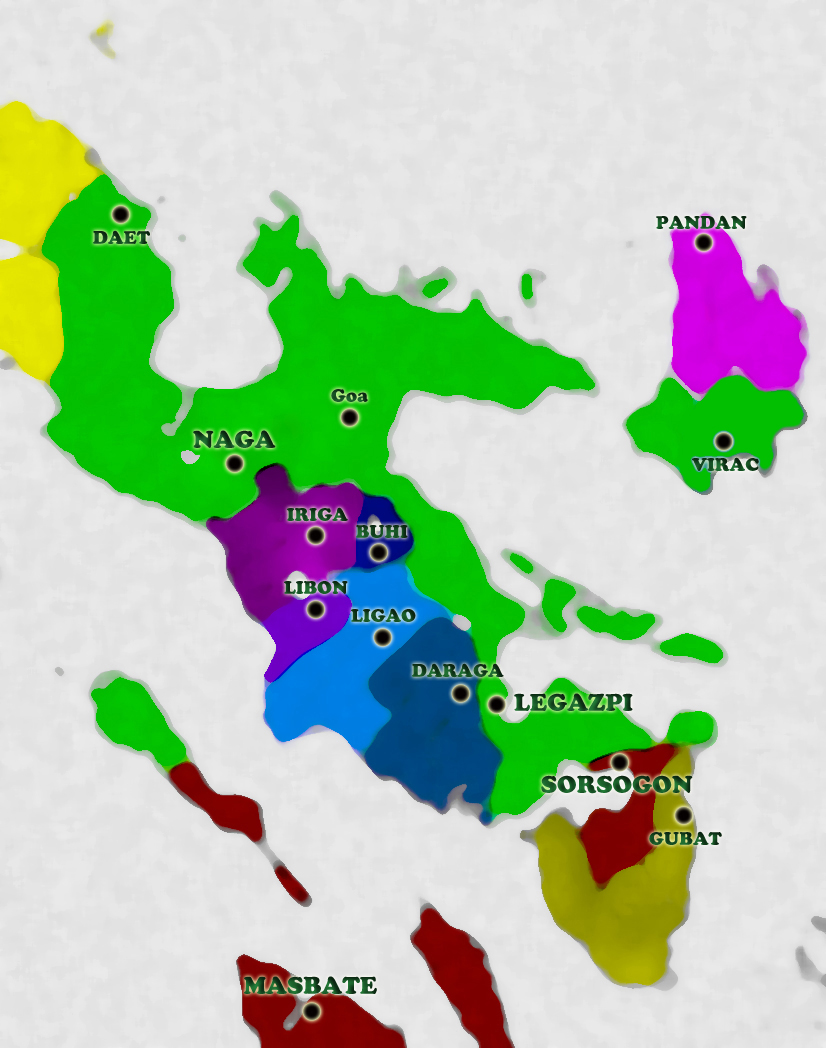
Coverage of Rinconada Bikol language (purple) Coverage of Albay Bikol languages: Buhinon Bikol (dark blue) Libon Bikol (violet) West Miraya Bikol (light blue) East Miraya Bikol (blue-gray)

Although properly considered separate languages, speakers of Rinconada Bikol or Rinconada can communicate with Albay Bikol speakers with ease and without code-switching. A student from Ligao City (West Miraya speaker) studying at a university in Iriga City can understand Rinconada (any variant) and can be understood by Rinconada speakers as well. The same thing will happen if a local tourist from Rinconada visits the Cagsawa Ruins in Albay or visits Donsol, Sorsogon (East Miraya speaker) for the annual whale shark sightings. The difference between Rinconada and Albay Bikol (both are included in the Inland Bikol group) is comparable to German and Yiddish or Portuguese and Galician, while the differences between variants are comparable to those between English US, English British and English Australian. The mutual intelligibility of Rinconada and Albay Bikol is 80% to 85%, while intelligibility between variants is 95% to 98%.

== Status ==
Rinconada Bikol is a minority language in the Bicol region despite having hundreds of thousands of speakers. It is currently not used in commercial media (print, radio, television) despite the fact that there are numerous prominent Rinconada speakers in the music and entertainment industry, media, and Philippine politics. It is not among the recognized regional languages in the Philippines and remains unknown to many Filipinos as it is poorly documented, researched and promoted.

Currently, the major obstacle to the diffusion of the usage and teaching of Rinconada is the lack of written material in Rinconada Bikol language, namely books, newspapers, software, magazines, etc. Thus, Rinconada, along with other Inland Bikol languages and the minor indigenous languages of Bicol region, remains essentially a spoken language.

Due to the everyday exposure of younger generations to Filipino/Tagalog and English in mass media and on social networking sites, native words that are rarely used are now disappearing and being replaced by their counterparts from other languages. If it cannot be stopped by any means, this trend is more likely to continue and might endanger the language in the near future.

=== Publication ===
The only dictionary written for the language is Rinconada: Bikol-Filipino-English Phrasebook: with Mini-dictionary (2001) of Jason Lobel and Grace Bucad of Nabua, Camarines Sur. Several books were successfully written and published by native speakers and non-speakers alike. Some were published by Frank Peñones, Jason Chancoco, Rizaldy Manrique, Jonher Cañeba and Kristian Cordero of Iriga City. In 2004, Ragang Rinaranga: mga rawitdawit, published by Frank Peñones, was the first anthology written in Rinconada Bikol.

On June 25, 2013, the Camarines Sur Polytechnic Colleges (CSPC), a state college in Nabua, Camarines Sur, established the Center for Rinconada Studies to serve as the research center for the Rinconada Bikol language and heritage.

== Distribution ==
Rinconada is spoken by the majority in Bula, Baao, Nabua, Balatan, Iriga and Bato in Camarines Sur (politically the fifth district of Camarines Sur province except the municipality of Buhi, where the majority speaks Buhinon). The language is dominant and the lingua franca in the southern half of the provincial capital town of Pili, the west barangays of Ocampo, and the far west barangays of Buhi; it can also be heard in neighboring places such as the northern barangays of Polangui and Libon in Albay.

Figure:

Town/City	Population	Percentage
Baao, Cam. Sur	54,971	100%
Balatan, Cam. Sur	28,699	100% (25% of the population is bilingual with Coastal Bikol)
Bato, Cam. Sur	48,306	100%
Buhi, Cam. Sur	24,603	1/3 of the population
Bula, Cam. Sur	68,011	100%
Iriga City	105,919	100%
Nabua, Cam. Sur	80,111	100%
Pili, Cam. Sur	41,153	(half of the population)
Polangui, Albay	27,435	(1/3 of the population)
Total	479,208

Based on the population of towns and cities with a concentration of Rinconada Bikol speakers, the total number is 479,208 or almost half a million. This number is based on the population of the fifth district of Camarines Sur (Rinconada) and neighboring towns of Polangui and Pili, in which Rinconada Bikol is their de facto daily language. Moreover, the total number does not include speakers outside the Rinconada area. Some linguists place the native speaker population at an estimated 600,000 because there are many speakers outside the region who have left in search of better job opportunities. An example of this are the Filipinos enlisted in the US Navy who are from Nabua, Camarines Sur, comprising 10% of all Filipino US Servicemen. Most of these Rinconada speakers now reside mostly in San Diego, California.
