= Apostolic Prefecture of Vichada =

Former Latin Catholic jurisdiction in Colombia (1956-1999)

Prefecture Apostolic of Vichada Praefectura Apostolica Vichada

Location
- Country: Peru
- Metropolitan: Exempt directly to the Holy See

Statistics
- Area: 102,900 km^{2} (39,700 sq mi)

Information
- Denomination: Catholic Church
- Sui iuris church: Latin Church
- Rite: Roman Rite

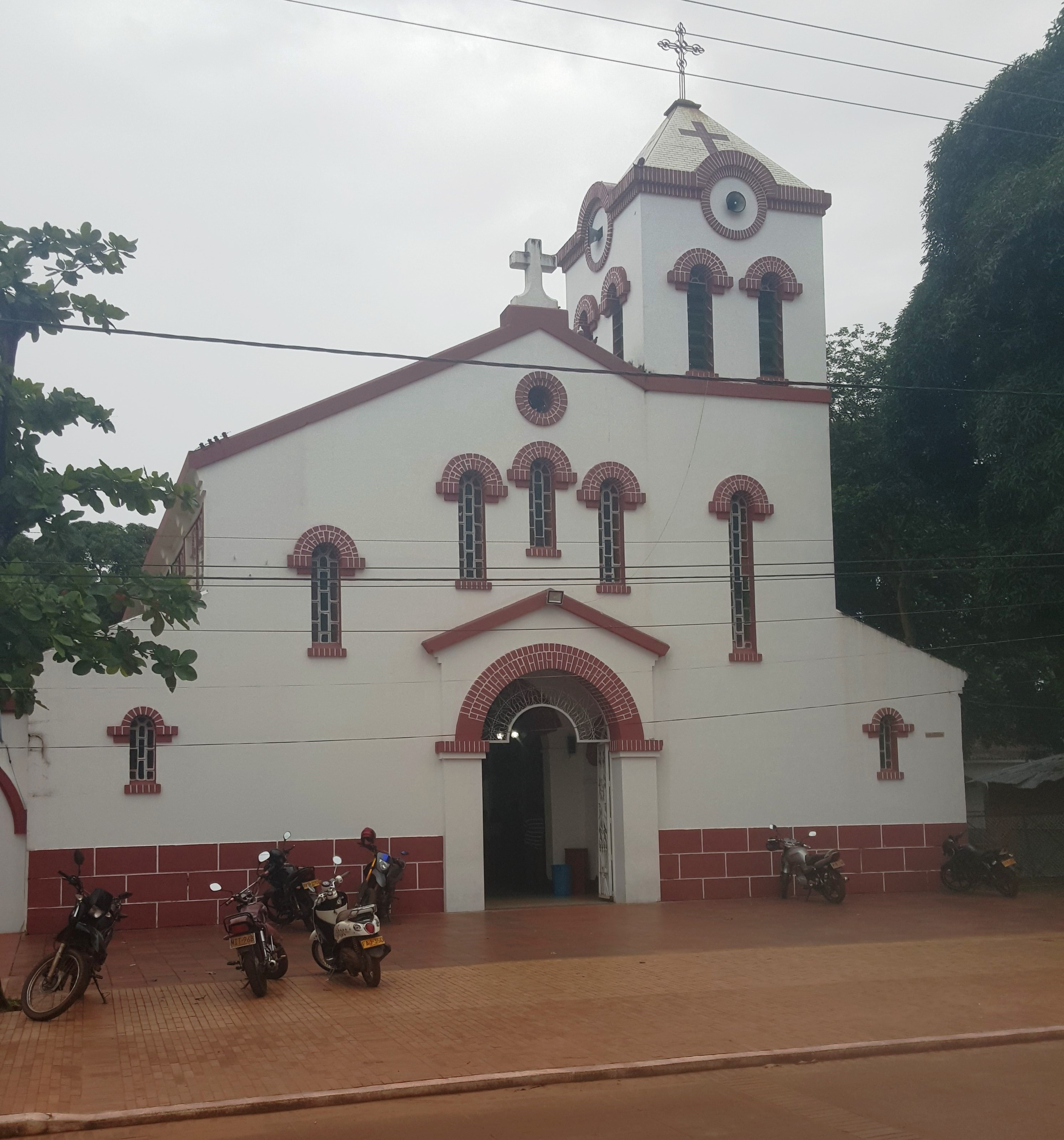
Cathedral of Our Lady of Carmen

The Prefecture Apostolic of Vichada (Latin: Praefectura Apostolica Vichada) was a Latin Church ecclesiastical jurisdiction or apostolic prefecture of the Catholic Church in Vichada Department, Colombia. It was suppressed in 1999.

== History ==
- April 7, 1956: Established as Apostolic Prefecture of Vichada, on territory split off from the Apostolic Vicariate of Villavicencio.
- December 22, 1999: Suppressed to Apostolic Vicariate of Inírida and to establish two other new Apostolic vicariates: Apostolic Vicariate of Puerto Carreño and Apostolic Vicariate of Puerto Gaitán.

== Ordinaries ==
all incumbents were missionary members of the Missionaries of the Company of Mary (S.M.M.)
Apostolic Prefects of Ucayali

- Fr. Emiliano Pied, S.M.M. (July 31, 1956 – 1962)
- Fr. Alfonso Cuypers, S.M.M. (January 22, 1963 – 1969)
- Fr. Lucreciano Onofre Gonsález, S.M.M. (March 28, 1969 – 1974)
- Fr. José Aurelio Rozo Gutiérrez, S.M.M. (May 6, 1977 – December 22, 1999)

== See also ==
- Catholic Church in Colombia
