= Rincon (surname) =

Rincón, Rincon is a Spanish surname. It may refer to these notable people:

- Alvaro Efrén Rincón Rojas (born 1933), Colombian Roman Catholic bishop
- Ann Rincon, American electronic design automation engineer
- Antonio del Rincón (1566–1601), novo-Hispanic Nahuatl-language grammarian
- Carolina Rincón, Mexican actress
- César Rincón, Colombian matador
- Daniel Rincón, Colombian road cyclist
- Francisco del Rincón, Spanish archbishop
- Freddy Rincón, Colombian football midfielder
- Hipólito Rincón, retired Spanish footballer and radio commentator
- Hugo Rincón, Spanish footballer
- Juan Rincón, Venezuelan baseball player
- Miguel Rincón Rincón, Peruvian convicted terrorist
- Oliverio Rincón, Colombian road cyclist
- Ricardo Rincón, Mexican baseball player
- Tomás Rincón, Venezuelan footballer
- Yoreli Rincón, Colombian footballer who has played for the Swedish club LdB Malmö
- Brazilian footballers:
  - Diogo Rincón, Diogo Augusto Pacheco da Fontoura, nicknamed Rincón
  - Gilvan Santos Souza, nickname Rincón, who plays for Santa Clara
  - Carlos Eduardo de Castro Lourenço, nickname Rincón, player for Troyes AC
