= Diocese of Lae =

Latin Catholic diocese in Papua New Guinea

Coordinates: 6.7310°S 147.0007°E

Diocese of Lae Dioecesis Laënsis
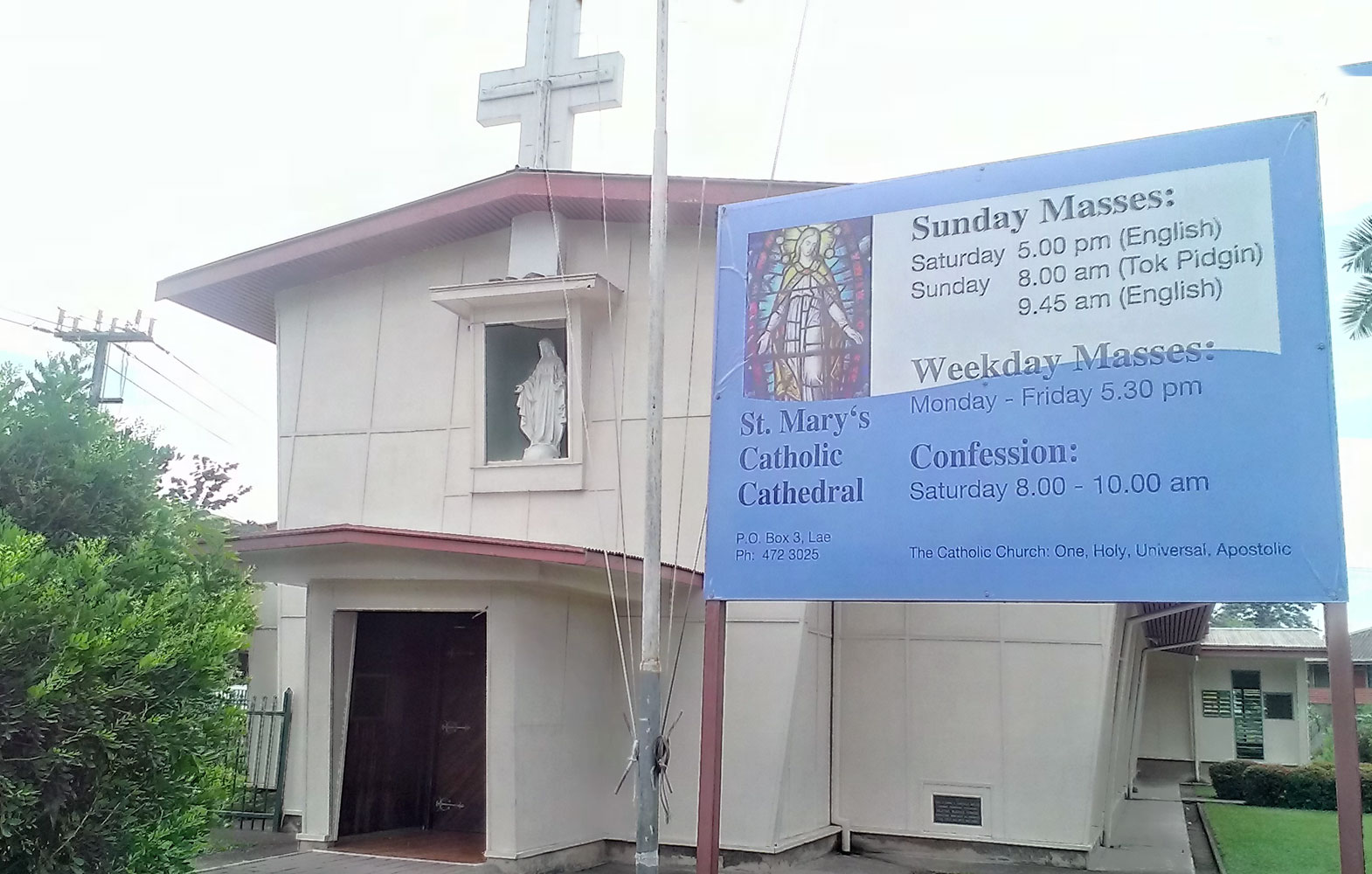
- St. Mary's Catholic Cathedral, Lae

Location
- Country: Papua New Guinea

Statistics
- Population: Total; Catholics: (as of 2013); 657,000; 36,400 (5.5%)
- Parishes: 18

Information
- Denomination: Catholic Church
- Sui iuris church: Latin Church
- Rite: Roman Rite
- Established: 15 November 1966

Current leadership
- Pope: Leo XIV
- Bishop: Rozario Menezes SMM

The Diocese of Lae is a Latin Catholic suffragan diocese of the Archdiocese of Madang, in Papua New Guinea. It was erected as a Vicariate Apostolic in 1959 and elevated to the status of a diocese in 1966.

== Ordinaries ==
- Henry van Lieshout, CMM (1966-2007)
- Christian Conrad Blouin, CMM (2007-2018)
- Rozario Menezes, SMM (2018–présent)

== See also ==
- List of Catholic dioceses in Papua New Guinea and Solomon Islands

== External links and references ==
- "Diocese of Lae". Catholic-Hierarchy.
