= Apostolic Vicariate of Puerto Carreño =

Catholic missionary jurisdiction in Colombia

Apostolic Vicariate of Puerto Carreño Vicariatus Apostolicus Portus Carreniensis Vicariato Apostólico de Puerto Carreño

Location
- Country: Colombia
- Headquarters: Puerto Carreño, Vichada Department, Colombia

Statistics
- Area: 57,000 km^{2} (22,000 sq mi)
- Population: Total; Catholics: (as of 2022); 51,600; 40,100 (77.1%)
- Parishes: 7

Information
- Denomination: Catholic Church
- Sui iuris church: Latin Church
- Rite: Roman Rite
- Established: 22 December 1999; 26 years ago
- Cathedral: Catedral Nuestra Señora del Carmen
- Secular priests: 18 (10 Diocesan, 8 Religious Orders)

Current leadership
- Pope: Leo XIV
- Vicar Apostolic: Álvaro Mon Pérez, C.Ss.R.
- Bishops emeritus: Álvaro Efrén Rincón Rojas, C.Ss.R.

Map

The Vicariate Apostolic of Puerto Carreño (Latin: Apostolicus Vicariatus Portus Carreniensis) in the Catholic Church is located in the city of Puerto Carreño in Colombia.

== History ==
On 22 December 1999 Blessed John Paul II established the Vicariate Apostolic of Puerto Carreño when the Prefecture Apostolic of Vichada was suppressed.

== Leadership ==
=== Apostolic Vicars of Puerto Carreño ===
- Álvaro Efrén Rincón Rojas, C.Ss.R. (22 December 1999 – 10 June 2010), resigned
- Francisco Antonio Ceballos Escobar, C.Ss.R. (10 June 2010 – 22 April 2020), appointed Bishop of Riohacha
  - Apostolic Administrator Raúl Alfonso Carrillo (25 April 2020 – 8 June 2023), Vicar Apostolic of Puerto Gaitán
- Álvaro Mon Pérez, C.Ss.R. (30 March 2023 – Present)

==== Pro-Vicar Apostolic ====
- Francisco Antonio Ceballos Escobar, C.Ss.R. (2008-2010), appointed Vicar Apostolic here

== See also ==
- Roman Catholicism in Colombia
