= Isak Doera =

Indonesian Catholic bishop

Mgr. Isak Doera
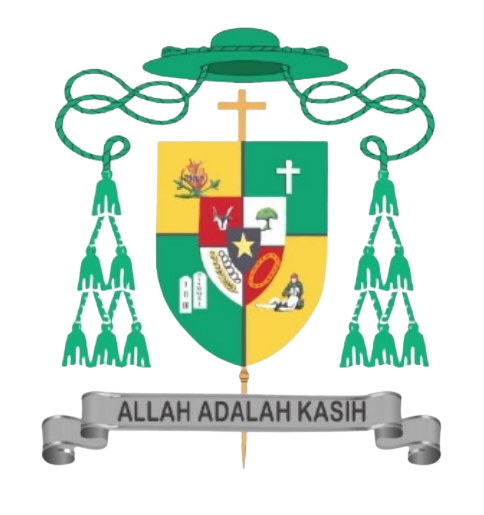
- Coat of arms of Mgr. Isak Doera
- Church: Catholic Church
- Appointed: May 19, 1977
- Predecessor: Lambertus van Kessel
- Successor: Agustinus Agus
- Other post

Orders
- Ordination: January 18, 1959
- Consecration: May 19, 1977

Personal details
- Born: Isak Doera; September 29, 1931 Jopu, Wolowuru, Ende, East Nusa Tenggara
- Died: May 19, 2012 (aged 80) Jakarta
- Denomination: Catholic

Isak Doera (September 29, 1931 – May 19, 2012) was an Indonesian Roman Catholic bishop.

Ordained in 1959, Doera was named a bishop of the Roman Catholic Diocese of Sintang, Indonesia in 1976. He resigned in 1996. He died on May 19, 2012, in Jakarta due to complications of his diseases and nervous problems.
