= Henry van Lieshout =

Henry van Lieshout (19 May 1932 in Venlo – 24 December 2009 in Lae) was the first Roman Catholic Bishop of the Roman Catholic Diocese of Lae, Papua New Guinea.

Born in the Netherlands, van Lieshout was ordained to the priesthood on 12 July 1959. On 15 November 1966, Pope Paul VI appointed him the first bishop of the Lae Diocese and he was ordained on 5 March 1967; Bishop van Lieshout retired on 15 January 2007.
