= Bou-Râs =

Bou-Râs is a town in located in Tissemsilt, Algeria, North Africa, located at latitude 33.6667°, longitude 1.8333° and an elevation above sea level of 956 metres. It is on the Oued Hassi Bou Râs river.

During the Roman Empire the town was called Arsennaria, a civitas of the Roman province of Mauretania Caesariensis.
