= José Vicente Huertas Vargas =

Colombian catholic priest (1940–2023)

His Excellency José Vicente Huertas Vargas
- Bishop Emeritus of Garagoa
- Metropolis: Tunja
- Appointed: 23 June 2000
- Term ended: 15 June 2017
- Predecessor: Guillermo Alvaro Ortiz Carrillo
- Successor: Julio Hernando García Peláez

Orders
- Ordination: 11 February 1967
- Consecration: 4 August 2000 by Beniamino Stella

Personal details
- Born: 12 April 1940 Ramiriquí, Colombia
- Died: 10 August 2023 (aged 83) Bogotá, Colombia

José Vicente Huertas Vargas (12 April 1940 – 10 August 2023) was a Colombian Roman Catholic prelate. He was bishop of Garagoa from 2000 to 2017.

Catholic Church titles
Preceded by Guillermo Alvaro Ortiz Carrillo	Bishop of Garagoa; 2000–2017	Succeeded by Julio Hernando García Peláez
