= Luis Horacio Gomez González =

Colombian Roman Catholic bishop

- Vicar Apostolic of Puerto Gaitán
- Church: Catholic Church
- See: Apostolic Vicariate of Puerto Gaitán
- In office: 10 July 2014 – 8 April 2016
- Predecessor: José Alberto Rozo Gutiérrez
- Successor: Raúl Alfonso Carrillo
- Other post: Titular Bishop of Liberalia (2014-2016)

Orders
- Ordination: 30 November 1991
- Consecration: 21 August 2014 by Ettore Balestrero

Personal details
- Born: 18 October 1958 Salamina, Caldas Department, Colombia
- Died: 17 April 2016 (aged 57)

Luis Horacio Gómez González (18 October 1958 – 17 April 2016) was a Roman Catholic bishop.

Ordained to the priesthood in 1991, Gómez González served as bishop of the Apostolic Vicariate of Puerto Gaitán, Colombia from 2014 until 2016.
