= Beniamino Stella =

Italian prelate of the Catholic Church (born 1941)

His Eminence Beniamino Stella
- Prefect Emeritus of the Congregation for the Clergy
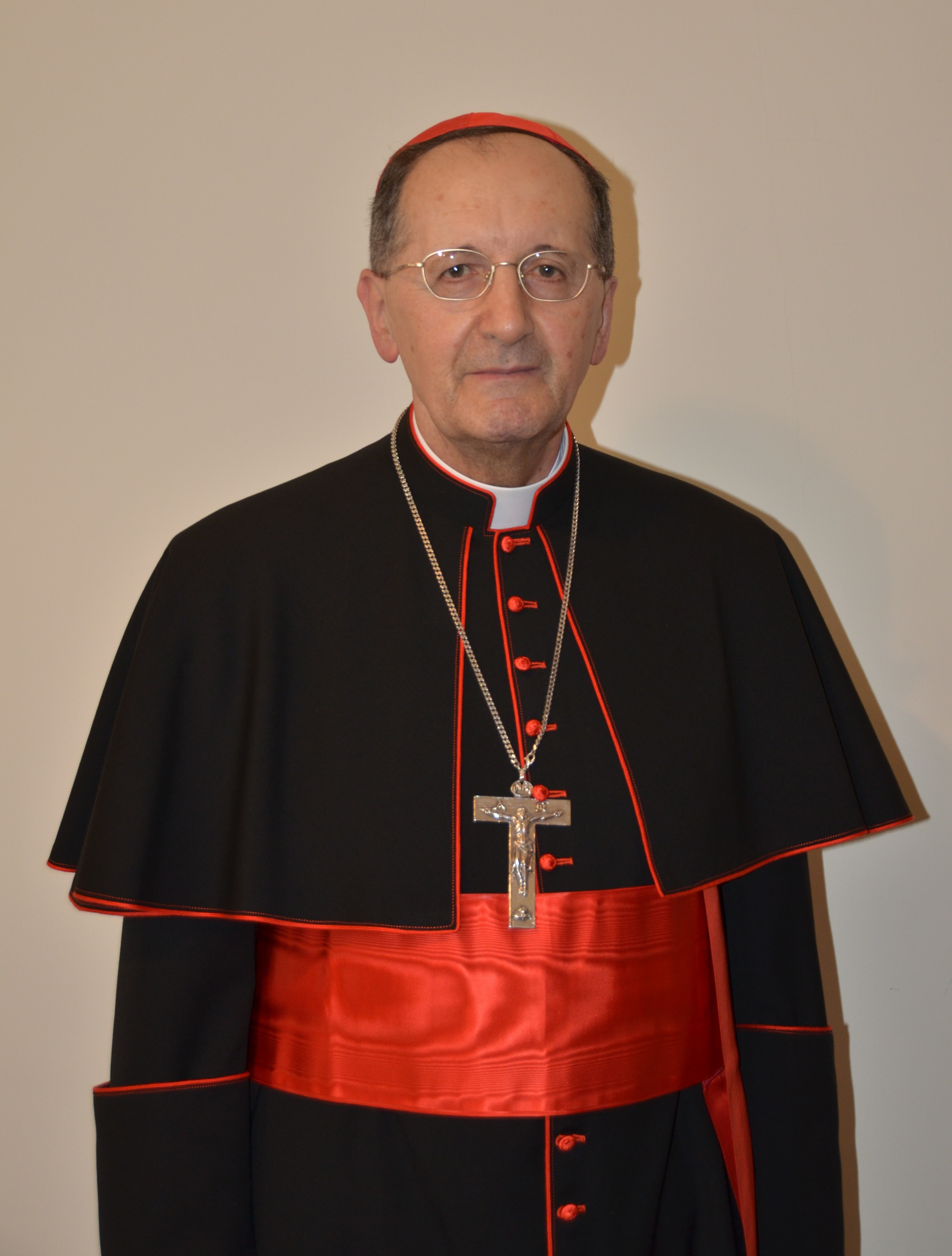
- Cardinal Stella in 2014
- Church: Roman Catholic Church
- Installed: 21 September 2013
- Term ended: 2 August 2021
- Predecessor: Mauro Piacenza
- Successor: Lazarus You Heung-sik
- Other post: Cardinal Bishop of Porto–Santa Rufina (2020–present)
- Previous posts: Titular Archbishop of Midila (1987–2014); Apostolic Pro-Nuncio to the Republic of the Congo (1987–1992); Apostolic Delegate to Chad (1987–1992); Apostolic Nuncio to Cuba (1992–1999); Apostolic Nuncio to Colombia (1999–2007); President of the Pontifical Ecclesiastical Academy (2007–2013); Cardinal Deacon of Santi Cosma e Damiano (2014–2020)

Orders
- Ordination: 19 March 1966 by Constantino Stella
- Consecration: 5 September 1987 by Pope John Paul II
- Created cardinal: 22 February 2014 by Pope Francis
- Rank: Cardinal deacon (2014–2020); Cardinal bishop (2020–present)

Personal details
- Born: Beniamino Stella; 18 August 1941 (age 85) Pieve di Soligo, Treviso, Kingdom of Italy
- Denomination: Roman Catholic
- Education: Pontifical Roman Seminary; Pontifical Lateran University; Pontifical Ecclesiastical Academy

Styles of Beniamino Stella
- Reference style: His Eminence
- Spoken style: Your Eminence
- Religious style: Cardinal
- Informal style: Cardinal

Ordination history of Beniamino Stella
History
Priestly ordination
- Ordained by: Costantino Stella
- Date: 19 March 1966
Episcopal consecration
- Principal consecrator: Pope John Paul II
- Co-consecrators: Eduardo Martinez Somalo; Jean Pierre Marie Orchampt
- Date: 5 September 1987
Cardinalate
- Elevated by: Pope Francis
- Date: 22 February 2014
Episcopal succession
Bishops consecrated by Beniamino Stella as principal consecrator
- Bernard Nsayi: 16 September 1990
- José Alberto Rozo Gutierrez, S.M.M: 19 March 2000
- Alvaro Efrén Rincón Rojas, C.SS.R: 24 March 2000
- José Vicente Huertas Vargas: 4 August 2000
- Héctor Javier Pizarro Acevedo, O.A.R: 27 January 2001
- Eulises González Sánchez: 10 March 2001
- Camilo Fernando Castrellón Pizano, S.D.B: 6 June 2001
- Misael Vacca Ramirez: 10 August 2001
- Fidel León Cadavid Marin: 22 September 2001
- Carlos Germán Masa Ruiz: 26 April 2003
- Ricardo Antonio Tobón Restrepo: 24 June 2003
- Luis Albeiro Cortés Rendón: 27 June 2003
- Luis Alberto Parra Mora: 11 December 2003
- Edgar Hernando Tirado Mazo, M.X.Y.: 31 March 2004
- Luis Felipe Sanchez Aponte: 22 April 2004
- Juan Vicente Cordoba Villota, S.J: 28 August 2004
- Jaime Enrique Duque Correa, M.X.Y: 25 February 2006
- Guillermo Orozco Montoya: 10 March 2006
- José Alejandro Castaño Arbeláez, O.A.R: 27 January 2007

Beniamino Stella (born 18 August 1941) is an Italian prelate of the Catholic Church. After working in the diplomatic corps of the Holy See, he served as prefect of the Congregation for the Clergy from 2013 to 2021. He was raised to the rank of cardinal by Pope Francis in 2014.

== Early years ==
Beniamino Stella was born in Pieve di Soligo, Province of Treviso, Italy. After finishing secondary education, he entered the Pontifical Roman Seminary and studied philosophy and theology at the Pontifical Lateran University.

He was ordained a priest of the Diocese of Vittorio Veneto on 19 March 1966 by his uncle, Archbishop Costantino Stella of L'Aquila. That same year, to prepare for a diplomatic career he entered the Pontifical Ecclesiastical Academy. While there he also earned a degree in canon law from the Pontifical Lateran University.

== Diplomatic service ==
He joined the diplomatic service of the Holy See in 1970 and held posts in the nunciatures in the Dominican Republic from 1970 to 1973 and in Zaire as secretary from 1973 to 1976. He was made a chaplain of His Holiness on 5 September 1974. From 1976 to 1978, he served in the Second Section of the Secretariat of State; then in Malta as auditor. In 1978, after Malta's prime minister Dom Mintoff declared the nuncio, Antonio del Giudice persona non grata, Stella headed the nunciature as chargé d'affaires. In 1983, he was assigned to the Council for the Public Affairs of the Church. He was assigned the rank of nunciature counselor on 1 February 1983.

On 21 August 1987, Pope John Paul II appointed Stella titular archbishop of Midila as well as Apostolic Pro-Nuncio to the Republic of the Congo and Apostolic Delegate to Chad. (Note: On 10 January 1989, his title changed from Apostolic Delegate to Apostolic Pro-Nuncio to Chad.) Stella received his episcopal consecration from the Pope on 5 September. On 15 December 1992, he was named Apostolic Nuncio to Cuba. On 11 February 1999, he was appointed Apostolic Nuncio to Colombia.

On 13 October 2007 Pope Benedict XVI appointed him President of the Pontifical Ecclesiastical Academy.

== Congregation for the Clergy ==
Pope Francis nominated him Prefect of the Congregation for the Clergy on 21 September 2013. On 16 December 2013 he was appointed as a member of the Congregation for Bishops.

In an interview on 27 February 2019, Stella revealed that, for approximately ten years, the Congregation of the Clergy had been responsible for matters concerning priests who violate their vows of celibacy. Regarding violation of the celibacy policy, Stella stated "In such cases there are, unfortunately, Bishops and Superiors who think that, after having provided economically for the children, or after having transferred the priest, the cleric could continue to exercise the ministry."

Pope Francis accepted Stella's resignation as prefect of the congregation on 11 June 2021 and appointed Lazarus You Heung-sik as his successor, with the proviso that Stella would stay on until You was able to move to Rome and take office. You took up his new post on 2 August.

== Cardinal ==
In the consistory of 22 February 2014, he was created Cardinal-Deacon of Santi Cosma e Damiano.

On 10 March 2015, Pope Francis appointed Stella a member of the Pontifical Committee for International Eucharistic Congresses.

He was named a member of the Pontifical Commission for the Vatican City State on 11 June 2016, of the Secretariat for Communications on 13 July 2016, of the Congregation for Divine Worship and the Discipline of the Sacraments on 28 October 2016, of the Congregation for the Doctrine of the Faith on 22 November 2016, and of the Congregation for the Evangelization of Peoples on 4 October 2017.

On 1 May 2020, Stella was raised to the order of cardinal bishop and assigned the suburbicarian see title of Porto-Santa Rufina.

He has served as the postulator for the canonization cause of Pope John Paul I since 2016.

Stella is ineligible to vote in the 2025 papal conclave since he is over the age of 80, but he is still able to participate in the pre-conclave meetings of cardinals. According to reports, during one of these meetings, Stella criticized the late Pope Francis for "bypassing the long-standing tradition of the church" by allowing the Catholic laity to serve in the Roman Curia. His remarks allegedly surprised other cardinals, as Stella was viewed as one of Francis' most trusted advisors. The same reports also mentioned Stella as a strong supporter of Cardinal Pietro Parolin for the papacy.

== See also ==
- Cardinals created by Francis

== Sources ==
Diplomatic posts
Preceded by John Bulaitis	Apostolic Pro-Nuncio to the Republic of the Congo; 7 November 1987 – 15 December 1992	Succeeded by Diego Causero
Preceded by Faustino Sainz Muñoz	Apostolic Nuncio to Cuba; 15 December 1992 – 11 February 1999	Succeeded by Luis Robles Díaz
Preceded by Paolo Romeo	Apostolic Nuncio to Colombia; 11 February 1999 – 13 October 2007	Succeeded by Aldo Cavalli
Educational offices
Preceded by Justo Mullor García	President of the Pontifical Ecclesiastical Academy; 13 October 2007 – 21 September 2013	Succeeded by Giampiero Gloder
Catholic Church titles
Preceded by Mauro Piacenza	Prefect of the Congregation for the Clergy; 21 September 2013 – 1 August 2021	Succeeded by Lazarus You Heung-sik
Preceded by Giovanni Cheli	Cardinal Deacon of Santi Cosma e Damiano; 22 February 2014 – 1 May 2020	Succeeded by Mario Grech
Preceded by Roger Etchegaray	Cardinal Bishop of Porto-Santa Rufina; 1 May 2020 – present	Incumbent
