= El Rincón, Durango =

El Rincón
- Location within Durango Location within Mexico
- Coordinates: 25.3289°N 105.7657°W
- Country: Mexico
- State: Durango

Government
  - none: none
- Time zone: UTC-6 (Central)

El Rincón is a town in the municipality of Tepehuanes in the Mexican state of Durango.

A small town that rests upon the crest of a mountainside. Home to roughly 400 people. The surrounding town, Tepehuanes, is the hub of transport, education, and supplies for El Rincón. Every so often, rodeos are held on top of a hill. It is by the town of Arroyo Chico. The Tepehuanes river runs to the north and west of the pueblo. It is a few hours drive from the city of Durango, Durango.

Some small stores are located within the small town. Supplies are brought in by trucks off the interstate a few miles away.
