= Álvaro Efrén Rincón Rojas =

Colombian Roman Catholic bishop (born 1933)

His Excellency Álvaro Efrén Rincón Rojas C.Ss.R.
- Apostolic Vicar Emeritus of Puerto Carreño
- Church: Roman Catholic Church
- Province: Immediately subject to the Holy See
- See: Apostolic Vicar of Puerto Carreño
- Appointed: 22 December 1999
- Term ended: 10 June 2010
- Predecessor: Vicariate established
- Successor: Francisco Antonio Ceballos Escobar
- Other post: Titular Bishop of Bettonium (since 1999)

Orders
- Ordination: 25 April 1962
- Consecration: 24 March 2000 by Beniamino Stella

Personal details
- Born: 14 April 1933 (age 93) El Calvario, Meta, Colombia
- Education: Pontificia Universidad Javeriana

Álvaro Efrén Rincón Rojas, C.Ss.R. (born 14 April 1933) is a Colombian Roman Catholic prelate who served as the first Apostolic Vicar of the Apostolic Vicariate of Puerto Carreño from 1999 until his retirement in 2010.

== Early life and education ==
Rincón Rojas was born on 14 April 1933 in El Calvario, Meta, in the Diocese of Villavicencio. He entered the Redemptorists and completed his philosophical studies at the minor seminary in Piedecuesta and his theological studies at the major seminary in Bogotá. He also pursued studies at the Pontificia Universidad Javeriana in Columbia with licentiate degree in theology.

He made his religious profession with the Redemptorists before being ordained a priest on 25 April 1962.

== Priestly ministry ==
Following his ordination, Rincón Rojas worked in parish ministry and formation within the Redemptorist congregation. He served as rector of seminaries, parish priest, missionary, and held several positions in the Apostolic Vicariate of Sibundoy, including delegate vicar and chancellor before his episcopal appointment.

== Episcopal ministry ==
On 22 December 1999, Pope John Paul II appointed Rincón Rojas the first Apostolic Vicar and Titular Bishop of Bettonium, following the erection of the Apostolic Vicariate of Puerto Carreño.

He received episcopal consecration on 24 March 2000 from Archbishop Beniamino Stella, with Bishops Fabio de Jesús Morales Grisales and Rodrigo Arango Velásquez serving as co-consecrators.

During his tenure, he oversaw the development of the newly created apostolic vicariate, focusing on evangelization and pastoral work in the sparsely populated Vichada region.

Pope Benedict XVI accepted his resignation on 10 June 2010 upon reaching the age limit for bishops. He was succeeded by Francisco Antonio Ceballos Escobar. As per 2025, he is residing at the Basilica of The Lord of the Miracles in Buga, Valle del Cauca.
