= Samuel Oton Sidin =

21st-century Indonesian Catholic bishop

Samuel Oton Sidin OFM Cap
- Bishop Diocese of Sintang
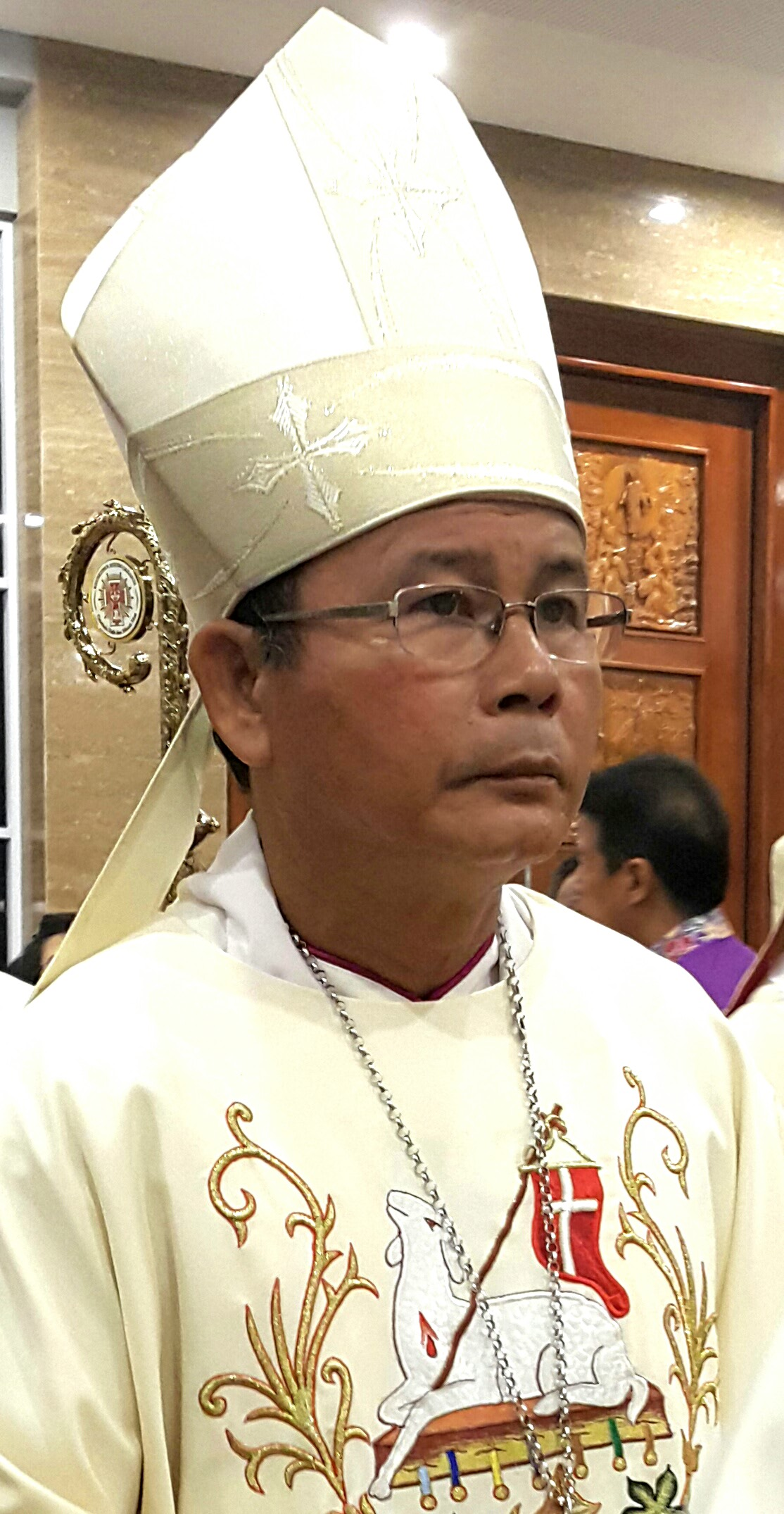
- Sidin in 2017
- Church: Roman Catholic Church
- Diocese: Diocese of Sintang
- In office: 2017–
- Predecessor: Agustinus Agus
- Previous post: Capuchin Priest

Orders
- Ordination: 18 July 1982
- Consecration: 1 July 1984
- Rank: Bishop

Personal details
- Born: 12 December 1954 (age 71) Pontianak, West Kalimantan
- Coat of arms

Samuel Oton Sidin OFM Cap (born 12 December 1954) is the Indonesian Roman Catholic bishop of Diocese of Sintang, being appointed in 2017.

Sidin was born in Pontianak, Indonesia, and attended seminary Nyarumkop and entered the order of Capuchin friars in 1977. He completed his philosophical and theological studies at the inter-diocesan seminary in Pematangsiantar in Medan. Sidin was ordained to the priesthood on 1 Jul 1984. He had taken his vows as a Capuchin friar two years earlier on 18 July 1982. Sidin held multiple positions as a Capuchin priest, being the parochial vicar in Nyarumkop from 1984–1985, being the provincial minister of Pontianak from 1997 to 2003, and from 2003 to 2008 had been in charge of missionary efforts among the Dayak people of Borneo. He was also the pastor of St. Francis of Assisi parish in Tebet, Jakarta until his ordination as bishop. After being ordained in 2017 at the age of 62 Sidin was installed as bishop of Sintang succeeding Agustinus Agus who had been appointed archbishop three years earlier. He is a member of the Order of Friars Minor Capuchin.
