= Christian Conrad Blouin =

Canadian-born Papua New Guinean Roman Catholic bishop (1941–2019)

Christian Conrad Blouin (1 November 1941 – 12 January 2019) was a Papua New Guinean Roman Catholic bishop.

== Early life ==
Blouin was born in Canada and was ordained to the priesthood in 1969. He served as bishop of the Roman Catholic Diocese of Lae, Papua New Guinea, from 2007 to 2018.

== See also ==
· · ·
