= Arsennaria =

Roman Empire - Mauretania Caesariensis (125 AD)

Arsennaria was an ancient Roman town of the Roman province of Mauretania Caesariensis in North Africa, and an ancient episcopal see of the Roman Catholic Church.

== Town Remains ==
The ruins of the city are tentatively located at Bou-Râs in modern Algeria. (36.334326n, 0.873111e)

Arsennaria flourished from 330BC – AD640.

== Bishopric ==
The only known bishop of this town from antiquity is Philo, who took part in the synod assembled in Carthage in 484 by the Vandal King Huneric, after which Filone was exiled.

Although the diocese did not survive past the Muslim conquest of the Maghreb, Arsennaria survives today as a titular bishopric, and the current titular bishop is Joseph Bùi Công Trác, auxiliary bishop of Hồ Chi Minh City.
