= Rincón (footballer, born 1977) =

Brazilian footballer

Personal information
- Full name: Gilvan Santos Souza
- Date of birth: 20 April 1977 (age 49)
- Place of birth: Mairi, Brazil
- Height: 1.79 m (5 ft 10 1/2 in)
- Position: Striker

Team information
- Current team: Santa Clara
- Number: 16

Senior career*
Years	Team	Apps	(Gls)
2001	Treze		
2002	Santa Cruz		
2002–2006	Marítimo	?	(?)
2004–2005	→ Paços de Ferreira (loan)	32	(18)
2006	→ Gil Vicente (loan)	0	(0)
2007	Treze	NA	
2007	ASA	NA	
2007–2008	Vizela	29	(9)
2008–	Santa Clara	32	(9)
- * Club domestic league appearances and goals as of 16:03, 8 September 2009 (UTC)

Gilvan Santos Souza (born 20 April 1977), known as Rincón, is a Brazilian footballer who plays for Santa Clara.

Rincón scored 18 goals for Paços de Ferreira to win promotion to Portuguese Liga. He scored 5 goals in 20 league matches for Marítimo at Portuguese Liga 2005–06 before back to Brazil.

In mid-2007, he returned to Portugal for Liga de Honra side Vizela.

== Honours ==
- Liga de Honra: 2005
