= Company of Mary =

Catholic missionary religious congregation

The Company of Mary (Latin: Societas Mariae Monfortana; abbreviated SMM), commonly known as the Montfort Missionaries, is a missionary religious congregation within the Catholic Church. The community was founded by Saint Louis de Montfort in 1705 with the recruitment of his first missionary disciple, Mathurin Rangeard. The congregation is made up of priests and brothers who serve both in the native lands and in other countries. The Montfortian Family comprises three groups: the Company of Mary, the Daughters of Wisdom and the Brothers of Saint Gabriel.

== History ==
As early as 1700 Montfort had conceived the idea of founding a society of missionaries. Five months after his ordination, in November 1700, Montfort wrote: "I am continually asking in my prayers for a poor and small company of good priests to preach missions and retreats under the standard and protection of the Blessed Virgin".

In 1713 he went to Paris with a view to recruit members for his community. The director of the seminary Du St-Esprit promised to send him such young priests as would feel called to do missionary work. During the intervals between his missions Montfort wrote the Rule of the Company of Mary though no official membership would develop before his death. After de Montfort died in 1716, two young priests and occasional collaborators, Father Adrien Vatel and Father Rene Mulot continued his mission. From 1718 to 1781 the "Mulotins", although few in number, gave over 430 missions throughout western France, most of which lasted a month.

After the French Revolution Montfort's community was reorganised by Father Gabriel Deshayes, elected superior general in 1821. He received from Pope Leo XII a brief of praise for the Company of Mary and for the Daughters of Wisdom, which had also been formed by de Montfort with the help of Blessed Marie Louise Trichet. Father Dalin who was superior general from 1837 to 1855, obtained canonical approbation of both congregations. Hitherto the missionaries had but one residence, the mother-house at Saint-Laurent-sur-Sèvre (where de Montfort and Trichet are buried) in the Pays de la Loire region. During Dalin's administration as general, several establishments were made in France. Under his successor, Father Denis (1855–1877) the community accepted the direction of a seminary at Pontchâteau in the Diocese of Nantes, from where priests were sent to Haiti, the company's first attempt at foreign missions.

The anti-clerical sentiment which arose in the French government in the late 19th century, resulted in the enacting of the Jules Ferry laws which led to many religious congregations which operated schools to leave France. The Montfortian novices took refuge in the Netherlands, where a novitiate and a scholasticate were established. In 1883, a school was also begun at Schimmert. That same year saw the establishment of the first house in Canada. The beatification of de Montfort, in 1888, gave a new stimulus to the company's expansion. A novitiate and a scholasticate were founded near Ottawa (1890); a mission school at Papineauville, Quebec (1900) and missions in Denmark. In 1901 the company took charge of what was then the apostolic vicariate of Nyassa Land (Malawi) where the congregation ministers to this day. The 20th century witnessed the expansion of the company throughout the world, and its members now serve on every continent.

== Vows ==
As members of a religious congregation Montfortians embrace the evangelical counsels, taking the three traditional religious vows of poverty, chastity and obedience.

== Religious formation ==
=== Post novitiate ===
Post novitiate is where the newly professed religious deepens his commitment as a member of the Montfortians and decides whether or not to make a lifelong commitment to vowed life. For those with a vocation to be a brother suitable training is pursued in his particular field of interest. It is normal for a brother to make his perpetual profession to the Congregation after 3 or 4 years. The Company of Mary asserts that

The Brothers in particular enrich the Mission with their talents as builders especially, as agriculturists, secretaries, leaders in catechesis and in liturgy: services that they continue to offer with the help of the computer and the internet.

Those called to Holy Orders study for a degree in theology, taking courses in philosophy if they have no experience of that discipline. At the end of this period of formation, which, according to Canon Law, may last between 3 and 6 years perpetual profession (final vows) is made and ordination to the diaconate follows and then to the presbyterate between six months and a year later. In exceptional circumstances, temporary vows may be extended beyond the 6-year period, but for no more than 3 years.

== Structure ==
As with all religious congregations in the Latin branch of the Catholic Church, the Montfortians are led by a superior general who calls a general chapter according to the constitutions of the company.

== Communities ==
- Belgium Vice-province: Marian apostolate, parishes, mission in Democratic Republic of Congo
- Canada Vice-province: parishes in Quebec, retreats, Marian shrine in Montreal and parish missions
- Colombia Province: seminary in Bogotá, parishes and a mission in the Vichada region
- France Province: parishes, missions in Argentina and Spain from where Spanish members have gone to Ecuador, missions in the Bahamas, Haiti, Réunion and Madagascar
- Germany General delegation: parishes, teaching, religious publications
- India Delegation: formation houses, education, tribal peoples, justice and peace
- Indonesia Vice-province: indigenous peoples, those affected by HIV, education
- Italy Province: parishes, retreats, parochial missions, publishing, missions in Madagascar, Malawi, Peru and Zambia
- Netherlands Province: missions in Brazil, Indonesia and Uganda, three parishes in Denmark with a presence in Mozambique
- Papua New Guinea Province (staffed solely by brothers and sisters): education, health care, those affected by HIV
- The Philippines General delegation: parish, rural communities on Cebu
- Portugal General delegation: parishes and international shrine of Our Lady of Fatima
- United Kingdom Vice-province: parish missions, retreats, immigrants, missions in Malawi and Uganda (where the work is primarily with those affected by AIDS)
- The United States Province: parishes, retreats, parish missions, publishing of religious periodicals, missionary work in Nicaragua

== Notable members ==
=== Bishops ===
- José Alberto Rozo Gutiérrez (1937–2018), titular bishop of Arsennaria and Vicar Apostolic of Puerto Gaitán (1999–2012)
- Thomas Luke Msusa (b. 1962), Bishop of Zomba (2004–2013), Archbishop of Blantyre (2013–present)
- Rui Valério (b. 1964), Military Ordinary of Portugal (2018–2023), Patriarch of Lisbon (2023–present)
- Rozario Menezes (b. 1969), Bishop of Lae (2018–present)

== See also ==
- Saint Louis de Montfort
- Daughters of Wisdom
