= Panay (disambiguation) =

Panay is the sixth-largest and fourth-most populous island in the Philippines.

Panay may also refer to

== Places ==
=== Philippines ===
- Panay, Capiz, a municipality on Panay island
- Panay River on Panay island
- Panay Gulf in Western Visayas, near Panay island
- Panay (Catanduanes), a small island in Bicol Region

=== Iran ===
- Panay, Iran

=== Uzbekistan ===
- Panay, Uzbekistan - populated place in Uzbekistan

== People ==
- Panos Panay, born 1972, Cypriot entrepreneur
- Panos Panay (Microsoft), a Microsoft vice-president

== Other ==
- Panay (film), a 2015 Taiwanese film
- Panay Sikat, the regional morning show of ABS-CBN Iloilo in the Philippines
- USS Panay (three different ships)
- Panay incident

== Animals ==
- Panay cloudrunner, mammal
- Panay striped babbler, bird
- Panay giant fruit bat
- Panay forest frog
- Panay monitor lizard
