= San Jose, Viga =

Barangay in Catanduanes, Philippines

San Jose (Oco) Barrio Oco, Pueblo de Oco
- Barangay
- The aerial view of San Jose Oco overlooking the stretch of the Oco River.
- Interactive map of San Jose (Oco)
- Coordinates: 13°51′20.9″N 124°17′6.9″E
- Country: Philippines
- Region: Bicol Region
- Municipality: Viga
- Congressional district: Lone district of Catanduanes
- Established: 1969

Government
  - Barangay Captain: Vicente Tuquero Tolod

Area
  - Total: 158.23 km^{2} (61.09 sq mi)

Population (2024)
  - Total: 1,112
  - Density: 7.028/km^{2} (18.20/sq mi)
- ZIP code: 4805

Barangay San José or most commonly known as Barangay Oco (PSGC: 052010023) is one of the thirty-one (31) barangays of Viga in the province of Catanduanes, Philippines. It lies for about 43 kilometres (27 mi) away from the Provincial Capital Virac, 3.5 kilometres (2.2 mi) from town proper of Viga and with the distance of 16 kilometres (9.9 mi) to the nearby town of San Miguel. According to the latest census, it has a population of 1,163 inhabitants (up from 1,040 in Census 2007). In the August 2015 census, the population grew +0.33% from 1,163 to 1,183 inhabitants.

The Barrio Oco was renamed Barangay San Jose with the passage of R.A. No. 5561 on June 21, 1969.

== Etymology ==
The site of the original settlement of Viga was at Caviga-e now called Viga. It was believed that a group of tribesmen led by certain “Abines” from the mainland was the first settlers. Due to frequent Moro depredations, they fled some four kilometers inland and settled in the place where most of the inhabitants were found to be relatively shorter in stature than ordinary natives, akin to pygmies, the primitive inhabitants who originally settled in northern Luzon. They called the place “Oco” in reference to short people or dwarfs.

In the latter part of the 16th century, a group of Spaniards, believed to be part of Juan de Salcedo’s expedition, reached the place and subdued the natives. They built a military encampment just at the junction called “Burdang” where streams meet and formed the Oco River, and extended up to the lowlands. The Spaniards named the settlement Pueblo de Oco, which means “Town of Oco”.

The Moros stopped their plundering, and the settlers returned to the lowlands, where the soil was more fertile. They selected an area where herbaceous giant gabi-like plants, which they called “Marviga” abundantly grew. The settlers became a mixed-race population as a result of intermarriage among native tribesmen.

An Augustinian friar named Francisco Putiocan became the first Catholic Priest and recognized leader. The Spaniards called the settlement “Viga”, a shortened name for Marviga. With the advent of the Spanish civil rule, the inhabitants were easily converted to the Catholic faith. As time went on, however, they felt the strain of Spanish cruelties. When the Philippine Revolution broke out, many able-bodied natives joined the nationalistic movement and fought the colonizer. They were known as the insurrectos and closely identified with the revolutionary movement called Katipunan.

Caviga-e is now the poblacion of the town of Viga, while Pueblo de San Jose de Oco is now Barangay San Jose. The Barrio Oco was renamed Barangay San Jose with the passage of R.A. No. 5561 on June 21, 1969.

St. Joseph the Worker Parish Church was founded in 1811 located in San Jose Oco.

== Geography ==
San Jose Oco overlooking the stretch of Oco River and Bordang Bridge at the foreground.

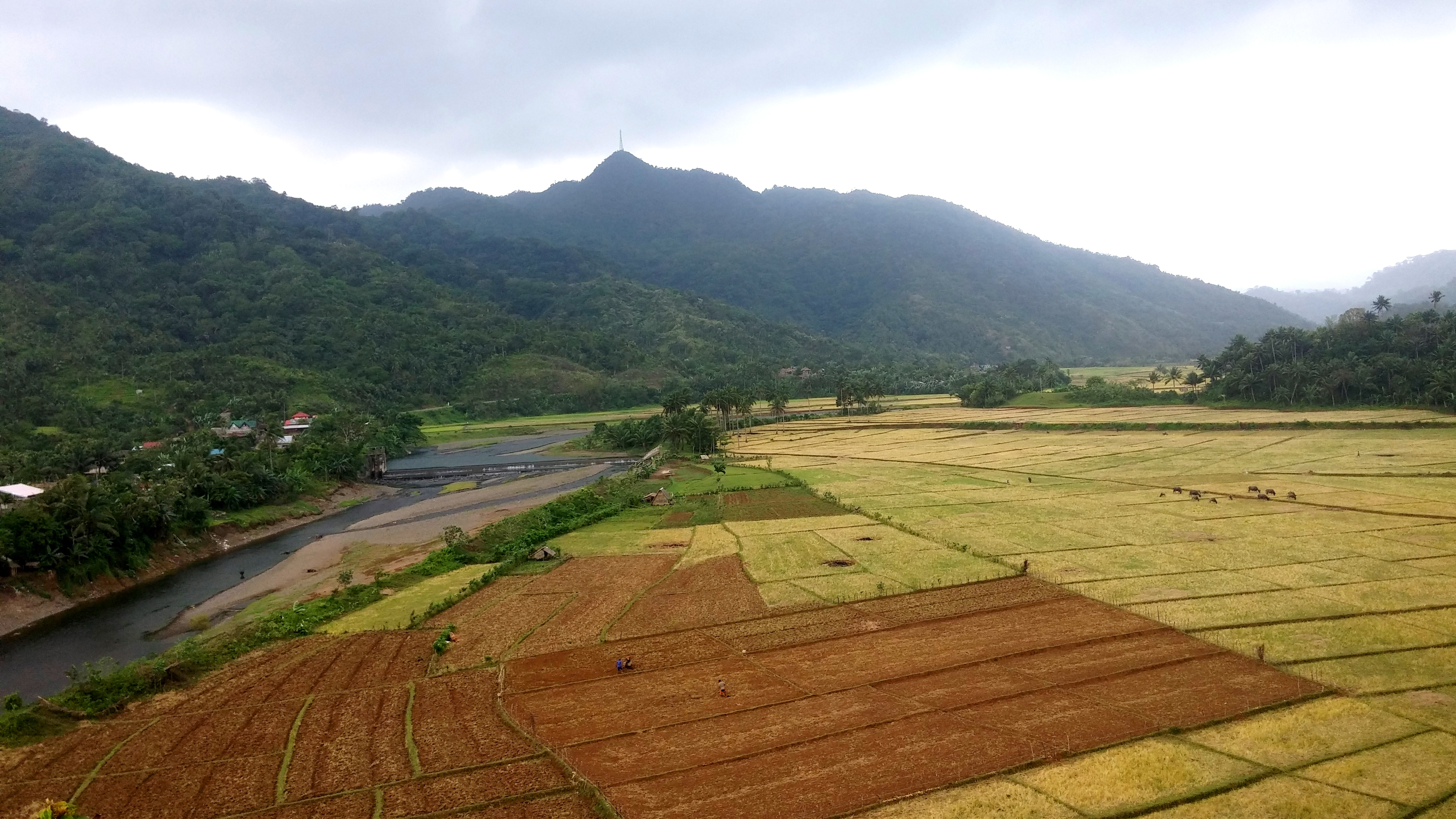
San Jose Oco Rice Plantation

San Jose Oco is mostly rugged and mountainous terrain. The nearest prominent mountains of significant importance include the ranges Magkanumpor and Magsumoso. It has a vast area of rice paddies. It is among the agricultural barangays of the municipality of Viga, considered the rice granary of the province. The two types of agricultural products raised are food and crops. The food crops being raised are palay, corn, banana, camote, and other root crops. The export crops are mainly Abacá. It is the principal source of livelihood for the Oconons.

== Demography ==
Population census of San Jose (Oco)
Year	Pop.	±% p.a.
2007	1,040	—
2010	1,163	+4.15%
2015	1,183	+0.33%
Source: National Statistics Office

According to the 2010 Census, it has a population of 1,163 inhabitants, grew from 1,040 in the 2007 Census. According to the August 2015 census, the population grew by at least 0.33%, bringing the total to 1,183 inhabitants.

=== Viga Interior Barangays ===
Composed of 10 Barangays and has a total population of 8,425.

- Almojuela
- Burgos
- Del Pilar
- Osmeña
- P. Vera (Summit)
- Quezon
- Rizal
- Roxas
- Sagrada
- San Jose Oco †

== Education ==
=== Elementary School ===
List of public elementary schools in Viga Interior

School ID	Name of School	Year Established	Location	District	Curricular Class	Class Organization
113317	Almojuela Elementary School	1978	Almojuela	Viga West	Kinder & Elementary	Combined Monograde and Multigrade
113319	Burgos Elementary School	1920	Burgos	Viga West	Kinder & Elementary	Monograde
113320	Del Pilar Elementary School	1972	Del Pilar	Viga West	Kinder & Elementary	Combined Monograde and Multigrade
113323	Osmeña Elementary School	1984	Osmeña	Viga West	Kinder & Elementary	Combined Monograde and Multigrade
113324	P. Vera Elementary School	1963	Pedro Vera	Viga West	Kinder & Elementary	Combined Monograde and Multigrade
113325	Quezon Elementary School	1972	Quezon	Viga West	Kinder & Elementary	Monograde
113326	Rizal Elementary School	1993	Rizal	Viga West	Kinder & Elementary	Monograde
113327	Roxas Elementary School	1968	Roxas	Viga West	Kinder & Elementary	Combined Monograde and Multigrade
113328	Sagrada Elementary School	1945	Sagrada	Viga West	Kinder & Elementary	Monograde
113329	San Jose (Oco) Elementary School	1940	San Jose (Oco)	Viga West	Kinder & Elementary	Monograde
113333	Summit Elementary School	1965	Pedro Vera (Summit)	Viga West	Kinder & Elementary	Combined Monograde and Multigrade

=== National High School ===
The table below contains the list of all the public senior high schools found in Catanduanes, as published by the Department of Education (DepEd). Included on the list are the municipalities, school ID, school names, and program offerings.

San Jose Oco National High School is the only public school offering Senior High School curriculum in Viga Interior.

School ID	Name of School	Year Established	Location	District	Education	Programs	Specialization
302097	San Jose National High School	1967	San Jose (Oco)	Viga West	Senior High	General Academic Strand & Technical Vocational Livelihood	Cookery (NCII), Bread and Pastry Production (NC II), Food and Beverage Services (NC II)

== See also ==
- Viga, Catanduanes
- Catanduanes, Philippines
