= Palumbanes =

Palumbanes Group of Islands
- Location within Catanduanes Location within Luzon Location within Philippines

Geography
- Coordinates: 14°01′N 124°02′E
- Adjacent to: Philippine Sea
- Major islands: Parongpong Island; Tignob Island; Calabagio Island

Administration
- Philippines
- Region: Bicol Region
- Province: Catanduanes
- Municipality: Caramoran

The Palumbanes or Palumbanes Islands, also known locally as “Parompong” (Porongpong), is a group of islands in the Philippine Sea located in the northern part of Caramoran, province of Catanduanes, Bicol Region, Philippines.

Palumbanes is accessible by motorboat and is less than an hour away or 13km away from the shoreline of the municipality of Caramoran. The islands are picture-perfect especially during summer. It has the view of a beautiful sunrise, green-contoured mountains, smiling children, and great off-white sand. It is considered as the fishing paradise of the north.

The island group is composed of three islands: Parongpong Island, the largest, followed by Tignob Island and Calabagio Island.

== Geography ==
Palumbanes is situated at a coordinate of 14°01′N 124°02′E.

== See also ==
- Caramoran, Catanduanes
- Catanduanes, Philippines
- Catanduanes State University

== Notes ==
- Palumbanes Islands - The Grand Adventure Nobody's Talking About
