= Joseph Santiago =

Member of the Philippine House of Representatives from Catanduanes' Lone District
- In office June 30, 2001 – June 30, 2010
- Preceded by: Leandro Verceles, Jr.
- Succeeded by: Cesar Sarmiento

Commissioner of the National Telecommunications Commission
- In office December 16, 1998 – February 8, 2001
- Appointed by: Joseph Estrada; Gloria Macapagal Arroyo
- Preceded by: Ponciano Cruz, Jr.
- Succeeded by: Agustin Bengzon

Personal details
- Born: December 19, 1964 (age 61)
- Party: Nationalist People's Coalition
- Education: San Beda College of Law

Joseph A. Santiago (born December 19, 1964) is a Filipino politician. A member of the Nationalist People's Coalition, he has been elected to three terms as a Member of the House of Representatives of the Philippines, representing the Lone District of Catanduanes. First elected in 2001, he was re-elected in 2004 and 2007.

A graduate of the San Beda College of Law, Santiago was formerly an executive with the Pilipino Telephone Corporation. In 1998, he was appointed by President Joseph Estrada as commissioner of the National Telecommunications Commission, and he served in that capacity until his election to Congress. From 1997 to 1998, Santiago served as team manager of the Mobiline Cellulars professional basketball team in the Philippine Basketball Association.

Preceded by Leandro Verceles, Jr.	Representative, Lone District of Catanduanes; 2001–2010	Succeeded by Cesar V. Sarmiento
