= Panay (Catanduanes) =

Island in Catanduanes, Philippines

Panay Island
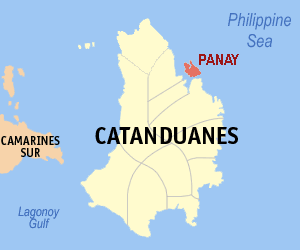
- Location within Catanduanes province

- Location within Catanduanes Location within Luzon Location within Philippines

Geography
- Coordinates: 13°57′46″N 124°19′58″E
- Adjacent to: Philippine Sea

Administration
- Philippines
- Region: Bicol Region
- Province: Catanduanes
- Municipalities: Bagamanoc; Panganiban

Demographics
- Population: 1,578 (as of 2020)

Additional information

Panay is a small island in the Philippines, located northeast of Catanduanes Island in the Bicol Region. It is often confused with the much larger Panay Island in Western Visayas. The island is politically under the province of Catanduanes and subdivided between the municipalities of Bagamanoc and Panganiban.

== History ==
Panay is shared by two municipalities: Bagamanoc and Panganiban. The two towns agreed on their borders on June 12, 1952 and was approved by their provincial board on July 12, 1952. The 3rd Congress of the Philippines approved the border changes on June 12, 1954 with Republic Act No. 1038.

A former United States Coast Guard LORAN station is located at the north of the island, in Quiragay, Bagamanoc. Built and operated in World War II, it was eventually handed over to the Philippine Coast Guard in March 1971 and decommissioned on December 31 that same year. Catanduanes Governor Araceli Wong proposed that the island be the site of a naval base. In 2017, Congressman Cesar Sarmiento proposed the construction of a Coast Guard base on Panay. Funds were allocated, but construction was halted due to a dispute on the ownership of the land on which the former LORAN station sits. The Provincial Assessor’s Office later surveyed the land to determine which boundaries were already titled to the Philippine Coast Guard.

== See also ==
- List of islands of the Philippines
