= Maygñaway River =

River in Catanduanes, Philippines

- Matalag River mouth Maygñaway River (Luzon) Maygñaway River (Philippines)

Location
- Country: Philippines
- Region: Bicol
- Province: Catanduanes

Physical characteristics
- Mouth: Philippine Sea
  - coordinates: 13°41′14″N 124°3′31″E

The Maygñaway River is a river on the island of Catanduanes in the Philippines. It drains into the Philippine Sea.
