= Abaca Festival =

Annual festival in Virac, Catanduanes, Philippines

Coordinates: 13.58°N 124.23°E

- Observed by: Catanduanes, Philippines
- Observances: Cultural dance, parade, musical, jobs fair, sporting events
- Date: 4th week of May
- Frequency: Annual

The Abaca Festival, formally known as Catanduanes Abaka Festival, is an annual festival held in Virac, Catanduanes, Philippines during the fourth week of May. It celebrates the abacá fiber, the Manila hemp industry, and the resilient spirit and culture of Catanduanes.

== Background ==
Catanduanes Island is the native habitat of the endemic abacá plant (a banana relative), which is cultivated for its strong fiber. Philippine Fiber Industry and Development Authority declared Catanduanes as the highest abacá producing province in 2010. Between 2009 and 2013, The Philippine Rural Development Program and the Department of Agriculture reported that Bicol Region produced 39% of Philippine abacá, while Catanduanes produced 92%.

On April 15, 2022, President Rodrigo Duterte signed Republic Act No. 11700, declaring Catanduanes as the abacá capital of the Philippines.

== Events ==
The main features of the festival are: Padadyaw Ginamlangan or Padadyaw kan Abaka, Pinukpok Fashion Show, Urag Catandungan sports competitions, Kantang Catandungan or Musika kan Isla, Festival Dance Competition, Binibini and Ginoong Bikol, Hagyan sa Kabitoonan and Jobs Fair.

== See also ==
- Virac, Catanduanes
- Catanduanes
- Catandungan Festival
