= Catandungan Festival =

Annual festival in Catanduanes, Philippines

- Official name: Catandungan Festival
- Observed by: Catanduanes, Philippines
- Observances: Carnival, Parade, Street Dancing (Pantomina)
- Date: 3rd weekend of October nearest October 24
- Frequency: annual

The Catandungan Festival is a festival held each year in Virac, Catanduanes, Philippines, every third weekend of October nearest October 24, which is when Catanduanes was founded as a province, independent from Albay.

== Events ==
The Festival features the "Pantomina Catanduanes", a colorful street dance competition during the festival period. Pantomina is a popular dance not just in the province but also to the whole provinces of Bicol region. Its movements are intended to be reminiscent of a mating dance between a rooster and hen.

== See also ==
- Virac, Catanduanes
- Catanduanes
- Abaca Festival
