= San Miguel, Catanduanes =

Municipality in Catanduanes, Philippines

San Miguel
- Municipality
- Municipality of San Miguel
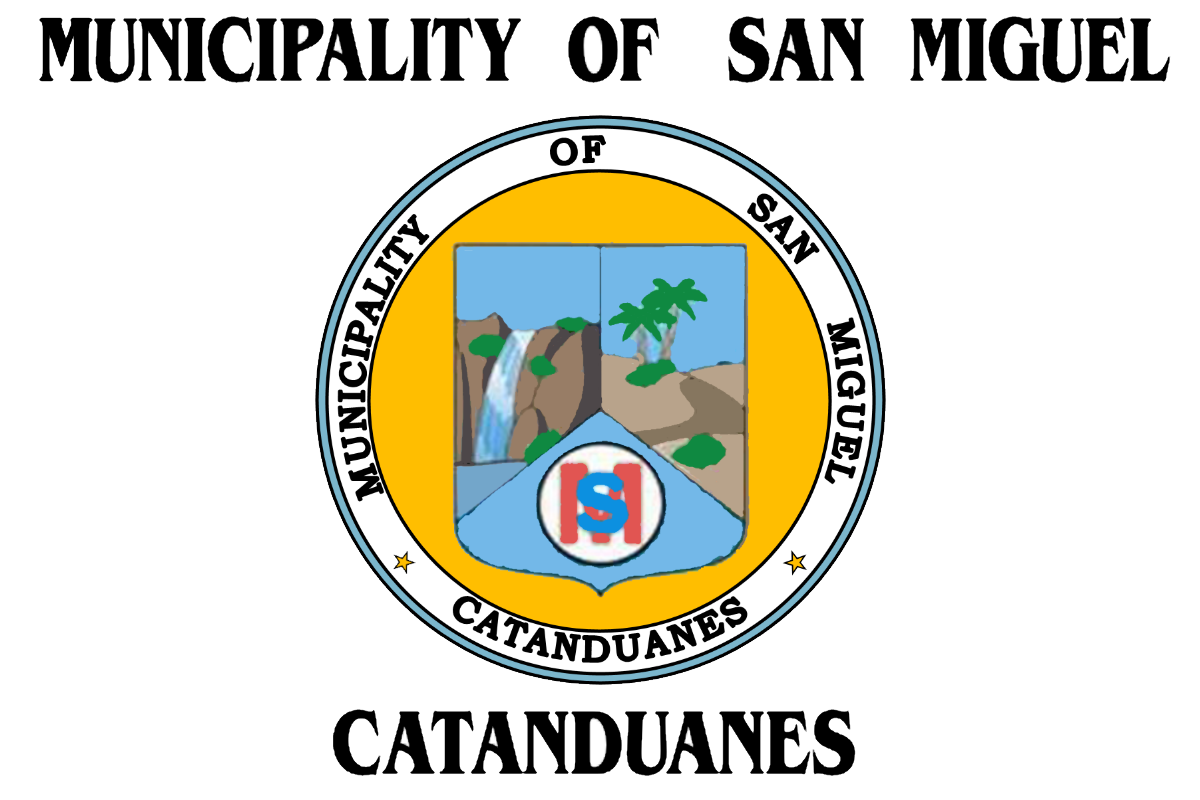
- Flag

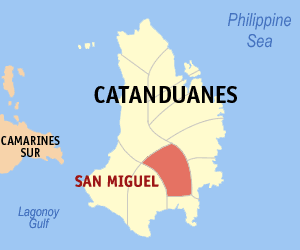
- Map of Catanduanes with San Miguel highlighted
- Interactive map of San Miguel
- Location within the Philippines
- Coordinates: 13°38′28″N 124°18′03″E
- Country: Philippines
- Region: Bicol Region
- Province: Catanduanes
- District: Lone district
- Founded: August 23, 1952
- Barangays: 24 (see Barangays)

Government
  - Type: Sangguniang Bayan
  - Mayor: Antonio Tapanan Teves "Halalan 2025 SAN MIGUEL, CATANDUANES Election Results". ABS-CBN News. COMELEC Election Returns. 2025-05-15.
  - Vice Mayor: Noel S. Morales
  - Representative: Eulogio R. Rodriguez
  - Municipal Council: Members: Manuel T. Sumulat; Miguel M. Sacris; Antonio I. Tuazon; Susan B. Bernal; Antonio T. Torrenueva; Romel T. Tapel; Delia B. Soriao; Nestor G. Teves
  - Electorate: 12,122 voters (2025)

Area
  - Total: 129.94 km^{2} (50.17 sq mi)
- Elevation: 231 m (758 ft)
- Highest elevation: 692 m (2,270 ft)
- Lowest elevation: 0 m (0 ft)

Population (2024 census)
  - Total: 14,578
  - Density: 112.19/km^{2} (290.57/sq mi)
  - Households: 3,415

Economy
  - Income class: 4th municipal income class
  - Poverty incidence: 32.2% (2023)
  - Revenue: ₱ 122.5 million (2024)
  - Assets: ₱ 247.5 million (2024)
  - Expenditure: ₱ 118 million (2024)
  - Liabilities: ₱ 45.05 million (2024)

Service provider
  - Electricity: First Catanduanes Electric Cooperative (FICELCO)
- Time zone: UTC+8 (PST)
- ZIP code: 4802
- PSGC: 0502009000
- IDD : area code: +63 (0)52
- Native languages: Bicol
- Website: www.sanmiguel-catanduanes.gov.ph

San Miguel, officially the Municipality of San Miguel, is a municipality in the province of Catanduanes, Philippines. According to the 2024 census, it has a population of 14,578 people.

== History ==
San Miguel, which was formerly part of the Municipality of Bato, was first inhabited by the early mountaineers and the part of the Malayan race that were pushed to the open valley with the coming of the Spanish Colonizers.

San Miguel became a separate municipality through then President Elpidio Quirino's Executive Order No. 803 dated August 23, 1952, comprising twelve barangays at that time. The first town mayor was Torribio Taopa who was chosen through a plebiscite in 1952 until the first local elections in 1953, which he won.

The present mayor is SP Antonio Tapanan Teves.

== Geography ==
San Miguel is located at the mid-south part of the province of Catanduanes, the only inland municipality of the island. It is bounded on the north by the municipality of Caramoran, on the east by the municipality of Baras and Gigmoto, on the west by the municipality of Virac and on the south by the municipality of Bato. San Miguel is 12 kilometres (7.5 mi) from Virac.

=== Barangays ===
San Miguel is politically subdivided into 24 barangays. Each barangay consists of puroks and some have sitios.

- Balatohan
- Salvacion (Patagan)
- Boton
- Buhi
- Dayawa
- Atsan (District I)
- Poblacion District II
- Poblacion District III
- J. M. Alberto
- Katipunan
- Kilikilihan
- Mabato
- Obo
- Pacogon
- Pagsangahan
- Pangilao
- Paraiso
- Santa Elena (Patagan)
- Progreso
- San Juan (Aroyao)
- San Marcos
- Siay
- Solong
- Tobrehon

=== Climate ===
Climate data for San Miguel, Catanduanes
Month	Jan	Feb	Mar	Apr	May	Jun	Jul	Aug	Sep	Oct	Nov	Dec	Year
Mean daily maximum °C (°F)	27 (81)	27 (81)	28 (82)	30 (86)	31 (88)	30 (86)	29 (84)	29 (84)	29 (84)	29 (84)	28 (82)	27 (81)	29 (84)
Mean daily minimum °C (°F)	22 (72)	22 (72)	23 (73)	24 (75)	25 (77)	25 (77)	25 (77)	25 (77)	25 (77)	24 (75)	24 (75)	23 (73)	24 (75)
Average precipitation mm (inches)	138 (5.4)	83 (3.3)	74 (2.9)	50 (2.0)	108 (4.3)	165 (6.5)	202 (8.0)	165 (6.5)	190 (7.5)	186 (7.3)	188 (7.4)	183 (7.2)	1,732 (68.3)
Average rainy days	16.8	11.9	13.5	13.8	20.5	25.2	27.4	26.2	26.1	24.7	20.7	18.5	245.3
Source: Meteoblue

== Demographics ==
Population census of San Miguel
Year	Pop.	±% p.a.
1960	10,111	—
1970	10,455	+0.33%
1975	11,222	+1.43%
1980	11,281	+0.10%
1990	11,587	+0.27%
1995	12,052	+0.74%
2000	12,205	+0.27%
2007	12,996	+0.87%
2010	14,107	+3.03%
2015	15,006	+1.18%
2020	15,680	+0.93%
2024	14,578	−1.73%
Source: Philippine Statistics Authority

In the 2024 census, the population of San Miguel was 14,578 people, with a density of 110 inhabitants per square kilometre or 280 inhabitants per square mile.

== Economy ==
Poverty incidence of San Miguel (%)

Source: Philippine Statistics Authority

== Tourist attractions ==
- San Miguel River Park - is the largest fresh-water stream in the entire Catanduanes island, stretching from the middle of the island all the way to the south. It's best explored while on an inflatable tube or a kayak for a refreshing ride. The jump off station is located at Bgy. Kilikilihan, San Miguel.
- Solong Falls - is a waterfall that is surrounded by trees. Located in Brgy. Solong, San Miguel.
- Bontahiya Falls - is another waterfall in San Miguel.

== Education ==
There are two schools district offices which govern all educational institutions within the municipality. They oversee the management and operations of all private and public, from primary to secondary schools. These are the:

- San Miguel North Schools District
- San Miguel West Schools District

=== Primary and elementary schools ===
- Alma Elementary School
- Balatohan Elementary School
- Boton Primary School
- Buhi Elementary School
- Caglatawan Elementary School
- Dayawa Elementary School
- J.M.A.-Tucao Elementary School
- Katipunan Elementary School
- Kilikilihan Elementary School
- Mabato Central Elementary School
- Obo Elementary School
- Pacogon Elementary School
- Pagsangahan Elementary School
- Pangilao Elementary School
- Paraiso-A Elementary School
- Paraiso B Elementary School
- Patagan Elementary School
- San Juan Elementary School
- San Marcos Elementary School
- San Miguel Cenral Elementary School
- Siay Elementary School
- Solong Primary School
- Tobrehon Elementary School

=== Secondary schools ===
- Catanduanes School of Advanced Technology (Annex)
- Mabato National High School (SMRDHS Annex)
- San Miguel Rural Development High School

== Notable personalities ==
- Noemi Tesorero (also known as Mahal), Filipino actress, comedian, and vlogger
