= USS Panay =

Three vessels of the United States Navy have been named USS Panay, after the Visayan island Panay.

- The first USS Panay (1899) was originally a Spanish gunboat, in the Philippines, purchased in 1899, after the American occupation, and in various service until 1914, and sold in 1920. Among those who served upon her were future World War II admirals Chester W. Nimitz and John S. McCain Sr.
- The second USS Panay (PR-5) was a river gunboat launched in 1927, and served on the Yangtze River Patrol (YANGPAT) in China until being sunk by Japanese aircraft on 12 December 1937; sometimes referred to as the 1937 Panay incident.
- The third Panay was the general auxiliary USS Midway (AG-41), renamed in 1943 to make the name Midway available for an aircraft carrier.
