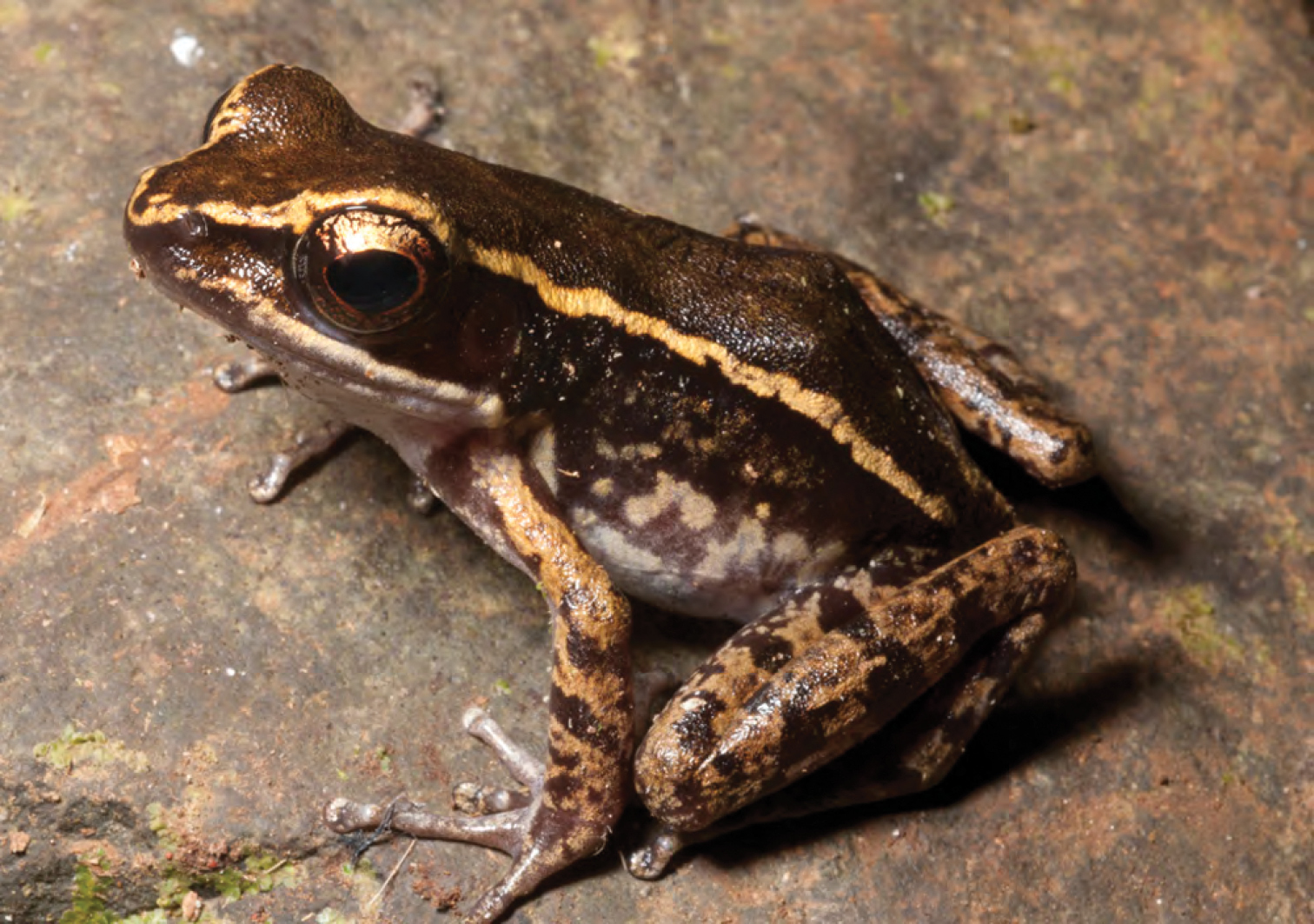

Conservation status
- Least Concern (IUCN 3.1)

Scientific classification
- Kingdom: Animalia
- Phylum: Chordata
- Class: Amphibia
- Order: Anura
- Family: Ranidae
- Genus: Hylarana
- Species: H. similis

Binomial name
- Hylarana similis (Günther, 1873)

Synonyms
- Rana similis (Günther, 1873)

= Hylarana similis =

Species of amphibian

Hylarana similis is a species of true frog in the genus Hylarana. It is native to Luzon and surrounding smaller islands in the Philippines. Its natural habitats are subtropical or tropical dry forests, subtropical or tropical moist lowland forests, rivers, intermittent rivers, freshwater marshes, and intermittent freshwater marshes. It is threatened by habitat loss.
