= Caramoran =

Municipality in Catanduanes, Philippines

- Municipality
- Municipality of Caramoran
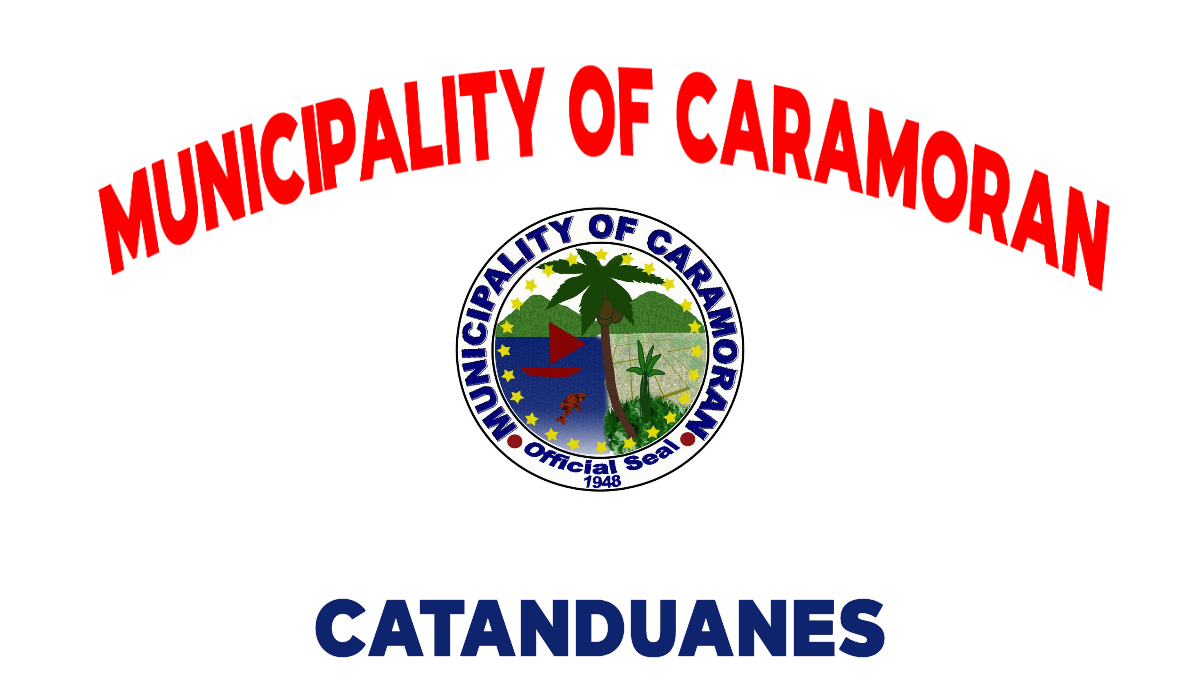
- Flag

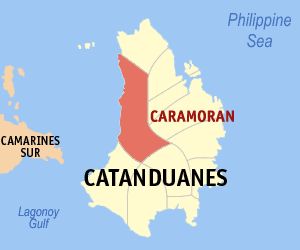
- Map of Catanduanes with Caramoran highlighted
- Interactive map of Caramoran
- Location within the Philippines
- Coordinates: 13°59′N 124°08′E
- Country: Philippines
- Region: Bicol Region
- Province: Catanduanes
- District: Lone district
- Founded: August 29, 1948
- Barangays: 27 (see Barangays)

Government
  - Type: Sangguniang Bayan
  - Mayor: Glenda V. Aguilar
  - Vice Mayor: Chyrrel D. Baro
  - Representative: Eulogio R. Rodriguez
  - Municipal Council: Members: Josue A. Aguilar; Mathew Bernard B. Fernandez; Ferdinand P. Tioxon Jr.; Antonio D. Bien; Maria Idanan; Rodulfo D. Palero; Bonfilio T. Fernandez; Zaldy F. Idanan
  - Electorate: 22,329 voters (2025)

Area
  - Total: 263.74 km^{2} (101.83 sq mi)
- Elevation: 41 m (135 ft)
- Highest elevation: 286 m (938 ft)
- Lowest elevation: 0 m (0 ft)

Population (2024 census)
  - Total: 30,124
  - Density: 114.22/km^{2} (295.82/sq mi)
  - Households: 6,573

Economy
  - Income class: 2nd municipal income class
  - Poverty incidence: 41.43% (2023)
  - Revenue: ₱ 194.8 million (2024)
  - Assets: ₱ 375.7 million (2024)
  - Expenditure: ₱ 188.1 million (2024)
  - Liabilities: ₱ 90.02 million (2024)

Service provider
  - Electricity: First Catanduanes Electric Cooperative (FICELCO)
- Time zone: UTC+8 (PST)
- ZIP code: 4808
- PSGC: 0502004000
- IDD : area code: +63 (0)52
- Native languages: Central Bikol; Tagalog
- Website: www.caramoran-catanduanes.gov.ph

Caramoran, officially the Municipality of Caramoran, is a municipality in the province of Catanduanes, Philippines. According to the 2024 census, it has a population of 30,124 people.

It is a quiet coastal town known for its clean beaches, clear waters, and rich natural scenery.

== History ==
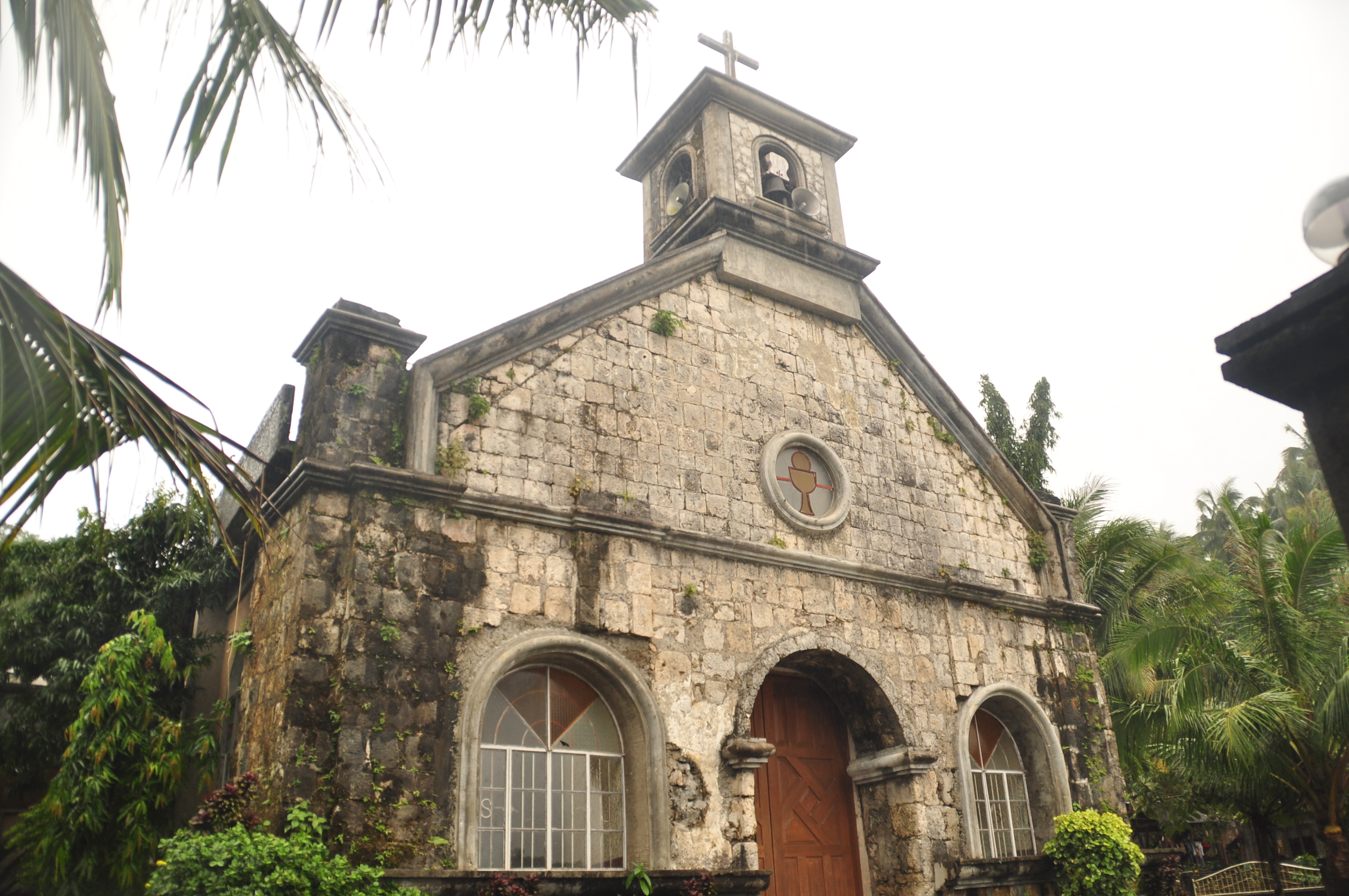
Caramoran Church

The early Spanish missionaries who came to the Philippines landed in Napacahan, a sitio in Tubli and established a parish, which lasted for many years. In the parish church, St. John the Baptist had been venerated until this day as the Patron Saint (feast day June 24).

Early Caramoran history disclosed the fact that the town originated in Napacahan, but due to relentless and repeated Muslim piracy in the 17th to the 18th century, the town was transferred to its present site Caramoran poblacion where the Muslim pirates could not anchor because of barrier reefs.

Over a hundred years after Spanish Sovereignty was established in 1570, Caramoran was founded as a town in 1676 side by side with the Catholic Church.

In the early colonial era, Catanduanes was only composed of two towns. The first, Viga, was founded in 1619 under the incumbency of Governor-General Manuel de Leon. In 1676, he established another town, which is now the municipality of Caramoran.

There are at least two possible origins of the name Caramoran. Old people of the town of Caramoan in Camarines Sur theorized that since their town is only separated almost 2 kilometers by Maqueda Channel from Caramoran in Catanduanes, the place also abound in "cara", the turtle's precious shell made into combs, bowls and decorative articles. Hence, a place where turtle "cara" shells are found in abundance, as in Caramoan. Another version is that this place is where "namo", wild plants that grow on vines with edible roots, are plentiful; Caramoran has this plant growing in abundance. These two towns are both far from their provincial capital and as such the inhabitants are closely knit in many aspects.

The municipal government ceased to exist when Caramoran was fused to the Municipality of Pandan in 1906, only to be resurrected following the incessant demand of the people under the leadership of then Don Camilo Rubio.

The late ex-Congressman Francisco Perfecto filed the bill in congress recreating Caramoran as an independent municipality. On August 29, 1948, then President Elpidio Quirino signed Republic Act No. 159 re-creating the municipality of Caramoran. Cong. Perfecto filed a bill “Outlawing Storm” and this fact made Catanduanes known to the world because the island lies in the typhoon belt.

== Geography ==
Caramoran is located in the northern part of the island province of Catanduanes, 86 kilometres (53 mi) from the capital town of Virac. From Tabaco, Albay, it can be reached by chartering a small passenger/cargo motorboat direct to Caramoran, or commercial ferry services like the M/V Eugenia, Starferry, or the fast sea vessel M/V Calixta to San Andres (Calolbon). From Virac or San Andres, a passenger jeepney or mini bus can be taken to Caramoran.

The municipality has the largest land area of the municipalities in the province. It has a total land area of 26,374 hectares (65,170 acres) which is 16.7% of the total land area of the province.

Caramoran is bounded on the north by the municipality of Pandan, on the east by the municipalities of Viga, Panganiban and Bagamanoc, on the south by the municipalities of San Andres and Virac, on the west by Maqueda Channel.

=== Barangays ===
Caramoran is politically subdivided into 27 barangays. Each barangay consists of puroks and some have sitios.

- Baybay (Poblacion)
- Bocon
- Bothoan (Poblacion)
- Buenavista
- Bulalacao
- Camburo
- Dariao
- Datag East
- Datag West
- Guiamlong
- Hitoma
- Icanbato (Poblacion)
- Inalmasinan
- Iyao
- Mabini
- Maui
- Maysuran
- Milaviga
- Panique
- Sabangan
- Sabloyon
- Salvacion
- Supang
- Toytoy (Poblacion)
- Tubli
- Tucao
- Obi

=== Climate ===
Climate data for Caramoran
Month	Jan	Feb	Mar	Apr	May	Jun	Jul	Aug	Sep	Oct	Nov	Dec	Year
Mean daily maximum °C (°F)	28.9 (84.0)	29.3 (84.7)	30.1 (86.2)	31.3 (88.3)	32.1 (89.8)	32.4 (90.3)	32.1 (89.8)	32.0 (89.6)	32.0 (89.6)	31.1 (88.0)	30.3 (86.5)	29.3 (84.7)	30.9 (87.6)
Daily mean °C (°F)	25.3 (77.5)	25.5 (77.9)	26.0 (78.8)	27.1 (80.8)	27.9 (82.2)	28.2 (82.8)	28.0 (82.4)	27.9 (82.2)	27.7 (81.9)	27.0 (80.6)	26.6 (79.9)	25.9 (78.6)	26.9 (80.5)
Mean daily minimum °C (°F)	21.8 (71.2)	21.7 (71.1)	22.0 (71.6)	22.9 (73.2)	23.7 (74.7)	24.0 (75.2)	23.9 (75.0)	23.9 (75.0)	23.5 (74.3)	23.0 (73.4)	23.0 (73.4)	22.6 (72.7)	23.0 (73.4)
Average rainfall mm (inches)	356 (14.0)	261 (10.3)	246 (9.7)	146 (5.7)	195 (7.7)	215 (8.5)	274 (10.8)	205 (8.1)	299 (11.8)	571 (22.5)	771 (30.4)	651 (25.6)	4,190 (165.1)
Source: Climate-Data.org

Caramoran has a tropical rainforest climate (Af) with heavy to very heavy rainfall year-round and with extremely heavy rainfall in January.

== Demographics ==
Population census of Caramoran
Year	Pop.	±% p.a.
1903	1,914	—
1948	9,619	+3.65%
1960	13,384	+2.79%
1970	17,540	+2.74%
1975	18,055	+0.58%
1980	19,386	+1.43%
1990	20,999	+0.80%
1995	21,963	+0.84%
2000	23,790	+1.73%
2007	25,618	+1.03%
2010	28,063	+3.37%
2015	30,056	+1.32%
2020	32,114	+1.40%
2024	30,124	−1.52%
Source: Philippine Statistics Authority

In the 2024 census, the population of Caramoran was 30,124 people, with a density of 110 inhabitants per square kilometre or 280 inhabitants per square mile.

== Economy ==
Poverty incidence of Caramoran (%)

Source: Philippine Statistics Authority

The main sources of livelihood of the town are growing rice, coconuts, and lasa and fishing. The white beaches and clean sea water of Toytoy and Sabang, the water falls of Ab-haw, Awinis and Garagag are some of the attractions, and together with the Hilacan River, are the main source of water for irrigation.

== Education ==
There are two schools district offices which govern all educational institutions within the municipality. They oversee the management and operations of all private and public, from primary to secondary schools. These are the:

- Caramoran North Schools District
- Caramoran South Schools District

=== Primary and elementary schools ===
- Bocon Elementary School
- Buenavista Elementary School
- Camburo Elementary School
- Caramoran Central Elementary School
- Dariao Elementary School
- Datag Central Elementary School
- Guiamlong Elementary School
- Hitoma-Bulalacao Elementary School
- Inalmasinan Elementary School
- Iyao Elementary School
- Mabini Elementary School
- Marian Formation Center
- Maui Elementary School
- Obi Elementary School
- Panique Elementary School
- Sabloyon Elementary School
- Salvacion Elementary School
- San Jose Elementary School
- Supang Elementary School
- Tubli Elementary School
- Tucao-Maysuram Elementary School

=== Primary and elementary schools ===
- Caramoran Rural Development High School
- Caramoran School of Fisheries
- Dariao National High School
- Milaviga Integrated School
- Palumbanes Integrated School
- Supang-Datag National High School
- Tubli National High School
