= Legislative districts of Catanduanes =

Legislative district of the Philippines

The legislative districts of Catanduanes are the representations of the province of Catanduanes in the various national legislatures of the Philippines. The province is currently represented in the lower house of the Congress of the Philippines through its lone congressional district.

== History ==
Catanduanes was represented as part of Albay's second district from 1907 to 1931, and fully comprised that province's fourth district from 1931 to 1946. It started electing its own representative in 1946, after becoming a full-fledged province in 1945. From 1978 to 1984 it was part of the representation of Region V.

Beginning in 2019, the districts used in appropriation of members is coextensive with the legislative districts of Catanduanes. Prior to 2019 when the province was just one congressional district, the Commission on Elections divided the province into two provincial board districts.

== Current District ==
Legislative Districts and Congressional Representatives of Catanduanes
District	Current Representative	Party	Population (2020)	Area
Lone	Eulogio Rodriguez, Jr. (since 2022); Bato	PFP	271,879	1,492.16 km^{2}

== At-Large (defunct) ==
Period	Representative
Regular Batasang Pambansa; 1984–1986	Jose M. Alberto

== See also ==
- Legislative districts of Albay
