= Catanduanes Provincial Board =

Legislative body of the province of Catanduanes, Philippines

Catanduanes Provincial Board Sangguniang Panlalawigan ng Catanduanes

Type
- Type: Unicameral
- Term limits: 3 terms (9 years)

Leadership
- Presiding Officer: Robert Fernandez, Lakas-CMD since June 30, 2025

Structure
- Seats: 13 board members 1 ex officio presiding officer
- Political groups: Lakas (7) NPC (3) Nonpartisan (1) Vacancy (2)
- Length of term: 3 years
- Authority: Local Government Code of the Philippines

Elections
- Voting system: Multiple non-transferable vote (regular members); Indirect election (ex officio members)
- Last election: May 12, 2025
- Next election: May 8, 2028

Meeting place
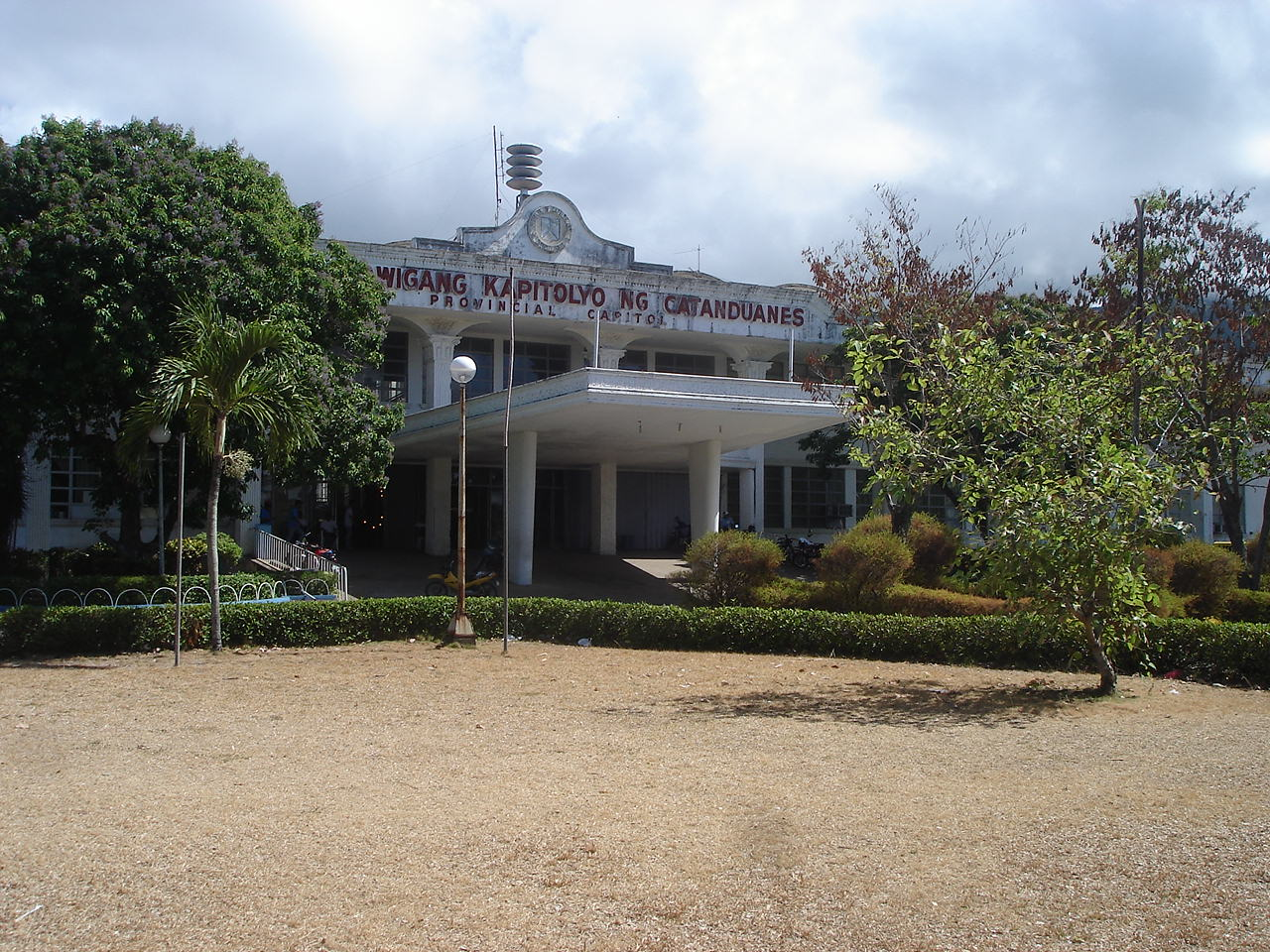
- Catanduanes Provincial Capitol, Virac

The Catanduanes Provincial Board is the Sangguniang Panlalawigan (provincial legislature) of the Philippine province of Catanduanes.

The members are elected via plurality-at-large voting: the province is divided into two districts, each having five seats. A voter votes up to five names, with the top five candidates per district being elected. The vice governor is the ex officio presiding officer, and only votes to break ties. The vice governor is elected via the plurality voting system province-wide.

Aside from the regular members, the board also includes the provincial federation presidents of the Liga ng mga Barangay (ABC, from its old name "Association of Barangay Captains"), the Sangguniang Kabataan (SK, youth councils) and the Philippine Councilors League (PCL) as ex officio members. They join the board once they are elected as president of their respective league or federation shortly after the start of their terms following the regular local elections (in the case of PCL) or the barangay and SK elections (in the case of ABC and SK).

== District apportionment ==
The districts used in appropriation of members is not coextensive with the legislative district of Catanduanes; unlike congressional representation which is at-large, Catanduanes is divided into two districts for representation in the Sangguniang Panlalawigan.

The first district includes the western side of the province, encompassing the capital, Virac, as well as the municipalities of Caramoran and San Andres. The second district comprises the eastern municipalities of Bagamanoc, Baras, Bato, Gigmoto, Pandan, Panganiban, San Miguel, and Viga.

In 2025, both districts gained 1 additional seat each after the Department of Finance upgraded the province's income classification to 2nd class, from 3rd class.

Elections	Seats per district		Ex officio seats	Total seats
Elections	1st	2nd	Ex officio seats	Total seats
1992–1998	3	3	3	9
1998–2025	4	4	3	11
2025–present	5	5	3	13

== List of members ==
=== Current members ===
These are the members after the 2023 barangay and SK elections and the 2025 local elections.

The names of regular members are listed in order of their rank in the local election in their respective district.

- Vice Governor: Robert Fernandez (Lakas)

Seat	Board member	Party	Term number	Start of term	End of term
1st district	Santos Zafe	Lakas	3	June 30, 2019	June 30, 2028
1st district	Fred Benedict Gianan	Lakas	1	June 30, 2025	June 30, 2028
1st district	Jose Romeo Francisco	Lakas	2	June 30, 2022	June 30, 2028
1st district	Xyrell Albaniel	Lakas	1	June 30, 2025	June 30, 2028
1st district	Giovanni Balmadrid	NPC	1	June 30, 2025	June 30, 2028
2nd district	Edwin Tanael	Lakas	3	June 30, 2019	June 30, 2028
2nd district	Lorenzo Templonuevo, Jr.	NPC	1	June 30, 2025	June 30, 2028
2nd district	Josevan Balidoy	Lakas	2	June 30, 2022	June 30, 2028
2nd district	Dean Roberto Vergara	Lakas	2	June 30, 2022	June 30, 2028
2nd district	Arnel Turado	NPC	1	June 30, 2025	June 30, 2028
ABC	Tito Villamor	Nonpartisan	1	January 12, 2024	January 1, 2026
PCL	Vacant (Note: Vacant pending the election of a new set of officers of the province's Philippine Councilors League.)				
SK	Vacant (Note: Vacated by Fred Benedict Gianan upon election as regular member of the Sangguniang Panlalawigan.)	Nonpartisan	–	TBD	TBD

=== Vice Governor ===
Election year	Name	Party
1992	Severo Alcantara	NPC
1995	Teofisto Verceles	Lakas
1998	Alfred Aquino	Lakas
2001	Cesar Sarmiento	Reporma
2004	Vincent Villaluna	Independent
2007	Alfred Aquino	NPC
2010	Jose Teves Jr.	Lakas
2013	Jose Teves Jr.	Lakas
2016	Shirley Abundo	NPC
2019	Shirley Abundo	PFP
2022	Peter Cua	PDP–Laban
2025	Robert Fernandez	Lakas

=== 1st District ===
- Municipalities: Caramoran, San Andres, Virac
- Population (2020): 147,114

Election year	Member (party)	Member (party)	Member (party)	Member (party)	Member (party)
1992	Alfred Aquino (LDP)	Fredeswindo Gianan (LDP)	Jesus Tacorda (PDP-Laban)	—	—
1995	Alfred Aquino (LDP)	Catalino Gabao, Jr. (NPC)	Evelyn Lucero-Gutierrez (LP)	—	—
1998	Rafael Zuniega (Lakas-NUCD)	Catalino Gabao, Jr. (Lakas-NUCD)	Evelyn Lucero-Gutierrez (Lakas-NUCD)	Fredeswindo Gianan (Lakas-NUCD)	—
2001	Rafael Zuniega (Aksyon)	Natalio Popa, Jr. (Independent)	Angeles Tablizo, Jr. (Reporma)	Fredeswindo Gianan (Aksyon)	—
2004	Rafael Zuniega (Reporma)	Shirley Abundo (Lakas)	Rosemarie Zafe (Kampi)	Fredeswindo Gianan, Jr. (NPC)	—
2007	Nel Asanza (NPC)	Shirley Abundo (Lakas)	Ariel Molina (NPC)	Natalio Popa, Jr. (Lakas)	—
2010	Nel Asanza (Independent)	Shirley Abundo (Lakas)	Rafael Zuniega (Nacionalista)	Jose Romeo Francisco (NPC)	—
2013	Nel Asanza (Independent)	Jorge Reyes (Liberal)	Giovanni Balmadrid (Liberal)	Jose Romeo Francisco (Liberal)	—
2016	Rafael Zuniega (UNA)	Natalio Popa, Jr. (Independent)	Giovanni Balmadrid (NPC)	Jose Romeo Francisco (NPC)	—
2019	Rafael Zuniega (UNA)	Natalio Popa, Jr. (PFP)	Giovanni Balmadrid (NPC)	Santos Zafe (PDP–Laban)	—
2022	Rafael Zuniega (NPC)	Jan Ferdinand Alberto (Independent)	Jose Romeo Francisco (Lakas)	Santos Zafe (Lakas)	—
2025	Xyrell Albaniel (Lakas)	Fred Benedict Gianan (Lakas)	Jose Romeo Francisco (Lakas)	Santos Zafe (Lakas)	Giovanni Balmadrid (NPC)

=== 2nd District ===
- Municipalities: Bagamanoc, Baras, Bato, Gigmoto, Pandan, Panganiban, San Miguel, Viga
- Population (2020): 124,765

Election year	Member (party)	Member (party)	Member (party)	Member (party)	Member (party)
1992	Carlos Aguilar (Lakas–NUCD)	Lilia Evangelista (Lakas–NUCD)	Francisco de los Santos (LDP)	—	—
1995	Carlos Aguilar (Lakas–NUCD)	Lilia Evangelista (Lakas–NUCD)	Edwin Tanael (Independent)	—	—
1998	Carlos Aguilar (Lakas–NUCD)	Lilia Evangelista (Lakas–NUCD)	Edwin Tanael (Reporma)	Edgar Tapel (Lakas–NUCD)	—
2001	Julieto Barceta (Reporma)	Romeo Tuplano (Lakas)	Edwin Tanael (Reporma)	Pio Tubalinal (Lakas–NUCD)	—
2004	Rene Vega (NPC)	Romeo Tuplano (Lakas)	Roger Pereyra (Lakas)	Edgar Tapel (Reporma)	—
2007	Edwin Tanael (Lakas)	Romeo Tuplano (Lakas)	Roger Pereyra (Lakas)	Francisco Camano, Jr. (NPC)	—
2010	Edwin Tanael (Nacionalista)	Wilfredo Santelices (Nacionalista)	Roger Pereyra (Nacionalista)	Marilyn Tatel (NPC)	—
2013	Edwin Tanael (UNA)	Lorenzo Templonuevo, Jr. (NPC)	Arnel Turado (Lakas)	Marilyn Tatel (Liberal)	—
2016	Vincent Villaluna (NPC)	Lorenzo Templonuevo, Jr. (NPC)	Arnel Turado (NPC)	Joseph Al Randie Wong (Liberal)	—
2019	Edwin Tanael (Independent)	Lorenzo Templonuevo, Jr. (NPC)	Arnel Turado (NPC)	Robert Fernandez (UNA)	—
2022	Edwin Tanael (Lakas)	Josevan Balidoy (PDP–Laban)	Dean Roberto Vergara (Lakas)	Robert Fernandez (PDR)	—
2025	Edwin Tanael (Lakas)	Josevan Balidoy (Lakas)	Dean Roberto Vergara (Lakas)	Lorenzo Templonuevo, Jr. (NPC)	Arnel Turado (NPC)

=== Liga ng mga Barangay member ===
Election year	ABC/LB President	Barangay Captain of
2018	Carlomagno Guerrero I	Bgy. Buenavista, Viga
2023*	Tito Villamor	Bgy. Santa Maria, Panganiban

*Took office in 2024

=== Philippine Councilors League member ===
Election year	PCL President	Councilor in
2019	Alan del Valle (UNA)	San Andres
2022	Joselito Alberto (NPC)	Bato
2025	(TBD)	

=== Sangguniang Kabataan member ===
Election year	SK President	SK Chairperson of
2018	Camille Qua	Bgy. Belmonte, San Andres
2023*	Fred Benedict Gianan	Bgy. Calatagan Proper, Virac

*Took office in 2024
