= Albay's 4th congressional district =

Legislative district of the Philippines

- Former constituency for the House of Representatives of the Philippines and the National Assembly of the Philippines
- Province: Albay

Former constituency
- Created: 1931
- Abolished: 1945

Albay's 4th congressional district is a defunct congressional district that encompassed the island of Catanduanes, a former territory of the province of Albay. It was represented in the House of Representatives of the Philippine Islands from 1931 to 1935, in the National Assembly of the Philippine Commonwealth from 1935 to 1941, and in the House of Representatives of the Philippine Commonwealth from 1945 to 1946. It was created by the 1929 reapportionment that redrew the boundaries of Albay's 2nd congressional district and allocated an additional district for the seven municipalities that comprised the island; the change took effect in 1931. Following the reorganization of a provincial government in Catanduanes in 1945, the district was dissolved and replaced by Catanduanes's at-large congressional district.

== List of members representing the district ==
=== House of Representatives (1916–1935) ===
No.	Portrait	Member	Term of office		Legislature	Party	Electoral history	Constituent LGUs
No.	Portrait	Member	Start	End	Legislature	Party	Electoral history	Constituent LGUs
District created June 1, 1931.
1		Pedro Vera	June 2, 1931	June 5, 1934	9th Legislature	Nacionalista Consolidado	Redistricted from the 2nd district and re-elected in 1931.	1931–1935; Baras, Bato, Calolbon, Pandan, Panganiban, Viga, Virac
2		Jose Surtida	June 5, 1934	November 15, 1935	10th Legislature	Nacionalista Democratico	Elected in 1934.	1931–1935; Baras, Bato, Calolbon, Pandan, Panganiban, Viga, Virac

=== National Assembly (1935–1945) ===
==== Commonwealth ====
No.	Portrait	Member	Term of office		Legislature	Party	Electoral history	Constituent LGUs
No.	Portrait	Member	Start	End	Legislature	Party	Electoral history	Constituent LGUs
(1)		Pedro Vera	November 15, 1935	December 30, 1941	1st National Assembly	Nacionalista Democrata Pro-Independencia	Elected in 1935.	1935–1941; Baras, Bato, Calolbon, Pandan, Panganiban, Viga, Virac
(1)		Pedro Vera	November 15, 1935	December 30, 1941	2nd National Assembly	Nacionalista	Re-elected in 1938.	1935–1941; Baras, Bato, Calolbon, Pandan, Panganiban, Viga, Virac
District dissolved into the two-seat Albay's at-large district for the Second Republic National Assembly.

=== House of Representatives (1945–1973) ===
No.	Portrait	Member	Term of office		Legislature	Party	Electoral history	Constituent LGUs
No.	Portrait	Member	Start	End	Legislature	Party	Electoral history	Constituent LGUs
District re-created May 24, 1945.
3		Francisco Perfecto	June 9, 1945	May 25, 1946	1st Commonwealth Congress	Nacionalista	Elected in 1941. Redistricted to Catanduanes's at-large district.	1945–1946; Baras, Bato, Calolbon, Pandan, Panganiban, Viga, Virac
District dissolved into Catanduanes's at-large district.

== See also ==
- Legislative districts of Albay
