= Albay's 2nd congressional district =

House of Representatives of the Philippines legislative district

- Constituency for the House of Representatives of the Philippines
- Map of Albay's 2nd congressional district

- Location of Albay within the Philippines
- Province: Albay
- Region: Bicol Region
- Population: 477,781 (2020)
- Electorate: 327,382 (2025)
- Major settlements: 5 LGUs: Cities; Legazpi; Municipalities; Camalig; Daraga; Manito; Rapu-Rapu
- Area: 665.94 km^{2} (257.12 sq mi)

Current constituency
- Created: 1907
- Representative: Caloy Loria
- Political party: NUP
- Congressional bloc: Majority

Albay's 2nd congressional district is one of the three congressional districts of the Philippines in the province of Albay. It has been represented in the House of Representatives of the Philippines since 1916 and earlier in the Philippine Assembly from 1907 to 1916. The district consists of Albay's capital city of Legazpi and adjacent municipalities of Camalig, Daraga, Manito and Rapu-Rapu. It is currently represented in the 20th Congress by Carlos Loria of the National Unity Party (NUP).

Prior to the creation of the fourth district effective 1931, the district consisted of Legazpi (formerly Albay), Daraga, Manito, Rapu-Rapu, and the island of Catanduanes, which was then part of the province.

== List of members representing the district ==
=== Philippine Assembly (1907–1916) ===
No.	Portrait	Member	Term of office		Legislature	Party	Electoral history	Constituent LGUs
No.	Portrait	Member	Start	End	Legislature	Party	Electoral history	Constituent LGUs
District created January 9, 1907.
1		Carlos A. Imperial	October 16, 1907	October 16, 1909	1st Legislature	Progresista	Elected in 1907.	1907–1912; Albay, Bato, Calolbon, Manito, Pandan, Rapu-Rapu, Viga, Virac
2		Silvino Brimbuela	October 16, 1909	October 16, 1912	2nd Legislature	Progresista	Elected in 1909.	1907–1912; Albay, Bato, Calolbon, Manito, Pandan, Rapu-Rapu, Viga, Virac
3		Mariano A. Locsin	October 16, 1912	October 16, 1916	3rd Legislature	Progresista	Elected in 1912.	1912–1916; Albay, Baras, Bato, Calolbon, Manito, Pandan, Rapu-Rapu, Viga, Virac

=== House of Representatives (1916–1935) ===
No.	Portrait	Member	Term of office		Legislature	Party	Electoral history	Constituent LGUs
No.	Portrait	Member	Start	End	Legislature	Party	Electoral history	Constituent LGUs
4		José O. Vera	October 16, 1916	June 3, 1919	4th Legislature	Nacionalista	Elected in 1916.	1916–1922; Albay, Baras, Bato, Calolbon, Manito, Pandan, Rapu-Rapu, Viga, Virac
5		Pedro Martínez Jimeno	June 3, 1919	June 2, 1925	5th Legislature	Nacionalista	Elected in 1919.	1916–1922; Albay, Baras, Bato, Calolbon, Manito, Pandan, Rapu-Rapu, Viga, Virac
5		Pedro Martínez Jimeno	June 3, 1919	June 2, 1925	6th Legislature	Nacionalista Unipersonalista	Re-elected in 1922.	1922–1925; Albay, Baras, Bato, Calolbon, Daraga, Manito, Pandan, Panganiban, Rapu-Rapu, Viga, Virac
6		Francisco A. Perfecto	June 2, 1925	June 5, 1928	7th Legislature	Nacionalista Consolidado	Elected in 1925.	1925–1931; Baras, Bato, Calolbon, Daraga, Legazpi, Manito, Pandan, Panganiban, Rapu-Rapu, Viga, Virac
7		Pedro Vera	June 5, 1928	June 2, 1931	8th Legislature	Nacionalista Consolidado	Elected in 1928. Redistricted to the 4th district.	1925–1931; Baras, Bato, Calolbon, Daraga, Legazpi, Manito, Pandan, Panganiban, Rapu-Rapu, Viga, Virac
8		Jose S. Valenciano	June 2, 1931	June 5, 1934	9th Legislature	Nacionalista Consolidado	Elected in 1931.	1931–1935; Camalig, Daraga, Legazpi, Manito, Rapu-Rapu
9		Justino Nuyda	June 5, 1934	November 15, 1935	10th Legislature	Nacionalista Democratico	Elected in 1934.	1931–1935; Camalig, Daraga, Legazpi, Manito, Rapu-Rapu

=== National Assembly (1935–1945) ===
==== Commonwealth ====
No.	Portrait	Member	Term of office		Legislature	Party	Electoral history	Constituent LGUs
No.	Portrait	Member	Start	End	Legislature	Party	Electoral history	Constituent LGUs
9		Justino Nuyda	November 15, 1935	December 30, 1941	1st National Assembly	Nacionalista Democratico	Re-elected in 1935.	1935–1941; Camalig, Daraga, Legazpi, Manito, Rapu-Rapu
9		Justino Nuyda	November 15, 1935	December 30, 1941	2nd National Assembly	Nacionalista	Re-elected in 1938.	1935–1941; Camalig, Daraga, Legazpi, Manito, Rapu-Rapu
District dissolved into the two-seat Albay's at-large district for the Second Republic National Assembly.

=== House of Representatives (1945–1973) ===
No.	Portrait	Member	Term of office		Legislature	Party	Electoral history	Constituent LGUs
No.	Portrait	Member	Start	End	Legislature	Party	Electoral history	Constituent LGUs
District re-created May 24, 1945.
(8)		Jose S. Valenciano	June 9, 1945	May 25, 1946	1st Commonwealth Congress	Nacionalista	Elected in 1941.	1945–1949; Camalig, Daraga, Legazpi, Manito, Rapu-Rapu
10		Toribio Perez	May 25, 1946	December 30, 1949	2nd Commonwealth Congress	Liberal	Elected in 1946.	1945–1949; Camalig, Daraga, Legazpi, Manito, Rapu-Rapu
10		Toribio Perez	May 25, 1946	December 30, 1949	1st Congress	Liberal	Elected in 1946.	1945–1949; Camalig, Daraga, Legazpi, Manito, Rapu-Rapu
(9)		Justino Nuyda	December 30, 1949	December 30, 1965	2nd Congress	Nacionalista	Elected in 1949.	1949–1957; Camalig, Legazpi, Manito, Rapu-Rapu
(9)		Justino Nuyda	December 30, 1949	December 30, 1965	3rd Congress	Nacionalista	Re-elected in 1953.	1949–1957; Camalig, Legazpi, Manito, Rapu-Rapu
(9)		Justino Nuyda	December 30, 1949	December 30, 1965	4th Congress	Nacionalista	Re-elected in 1957.	1957–1961; Camalig, Daraga, Legazpi, Manito, Rapu-Rapu
(9)		Justino Nuyda	December 30, 1949	December 30, 1965	5th Congress	Nacionalista	Re-elected in 1961.	1961–1969; Camalig, Legazpi, Locsin, Manito, Rapu-Rapu
11		Carlos R. Imperial	December 30, 1965	January 17, 1973	6th Congress	Nacionalista	Elected in 1965.	1961–1969; Camalig, Legazpi, Locsin, Manito, Rapu-Rapu
11		Carlos R. Imperial	December 30, 1965	January 17, 1973	7th Congress	Nacionalista	Elected in 1969. Term cut short upon the ratification of a new Constitution.	1969–1973; Camalig, Daraga, Legazpi, Manito, Rapu-Rapu
District dissolved into the twelve-seat Region V's at-large district for the Interim Batasang Pambansa, followed by the three-seat Albay's at-large district for the Regular Batasang Pambansa.

=== House of Representatives (1987–present) ===
No.	Portrait	Member	Term of office		Legislature	Party	Electoral history	Constituent LGUs
No.	Portrait	Member	Start	End	Legislature	Party	Electoral history	Constituent LGUs
District re-created February 2, 1987.
(11)		Carlos R. Imperial	June 30, 1987	June 30, 1998	8th Congress	Independent	Elected in 1987.	1987–present Camalig, Daraga, Legazpi, Manito, Rapu-Rapu
(11)		Carlos R. Imperial	June 30, 1987	June 30, 1998	9th Congress	NPC	Re-elected in 1992.	1987–present Camalig, Daraga, Legazpi, Manito, Rapu-Rapu
(11)		Carlos R. Imperial	June 30, 1987	June 30, 1998	10th Congress	NPC	Re-elected in 1995.	1987–present Camalig, Daraga, Legazpi, Manito, Rapu-Rapu
12		Norma Imperial	June 30, 1998	September 29, 2000	11th Congress	LAMMP	Elected in 1998. Died in office.	1987–present Camalig, Daraga, Legazpi, Manito, Rapu-Rapu
Vacant			September 29, 2000	June 30, 2001	11th Congress	—	No special election held to fill vacancy.	1987–present Camalig, Daraga, Legazpi, Manito, Rapu-Rapu
11		Carlos R. Imperial	June 30, 2001	June 30, 2007	12th Congress	NPC	Elected in 2001.	1987–present Camalig, Daraga, Legazpi, Manito, Rapu-Rapu
11		Carlos R. Imperial	June 30, 2001	June 30, 2007	13th Congress	Lakas	Re-elected in 2004.	1987–present Camalig, Daraga, Legazpi, Manito, Rapu-Rapu
13		Al Francis Bichara	June 30, 2007	June 30, 2016	14th Congress	Nacionalista	Elected in 2007.	1987–present Camalig, Daraga, Legazpi, Manito, Rapu-Rapu
13		Al Francis Bichara	June 30, 2007	June 30, 2016	15th Congress	Nacionalista	Re-elected in 2010.	1987–present Camalig, Daraga, Legazpi, Manito, Rapu-Rapu
13		Al Francis Bichara	June 30, 2007	June 30, 2016	16th Congress	Nacionalista	Re-elected in 2013.	1987–present Camalig, Daraga, Legazpi, Manito, Rapu-Rapu
14		Joey Salceda	June 30, 2016	June 30, 2025	17th Congress	Liberal	Elected in 2016.	1987–present Camalig, Daraga, Legazpi, Manito, Rapu-Rapu
14		Joey Salceda	June 30, 2016	June 30, 2025	18th Congress	PDP–Laban	Re-elected in 2019.	1987–present Camalig, Daraga, Legazpi, Manito, Rapu-Rapu
14		Joey Salceda	June 30, 2016	June 30, 2025	19th Congress	Lakas	Re-elected in 2022.	1987–present Camalig, Daraga, Legazpi, Manito, Rapu-Rapu
15		Caloy Loria	June 30, 2025	Incumbent	20th Congress	PDP	Elected in 2025.	1987–present Camalig, Daraga, Legazpi, Manito, Rapu-Rapu
15		Caloy Loria	June 30, 2025	Incumbent	20th Congress	NUP	Elected in 2025.	1987–present Camalig, Daraga, Legazpi, Manito, Rapu-Rapu

== Election results ==
=== 1953 ===
1953 Philippine House of Representatives elections in Albay
Party	Candidate	Votes	%
Nacionalista	Justino Nuyda (incumbent)	10,141	44.84
Liberal	Toribio Perez	8,134	35.96
Nacionalista	Honesto de Vera	3,271	14.46
Liberal (ind.)	Gregorio Sabater	1,069	4.73
Independent	Jose Crisol	3	0.01
Nacionalista	Antonio Azaña	0	0.00
Total votes		22,618	100.00
Nacionalista hold			

=== 1965 ===
1965 Philippine House of Representatives elections in Albay
Party	Candidate	Votes	%
Nacionalista	Carlos R. Imperial	21,635	50.97
Liberal	Toribio Perez	11,683	27.52
Liberal	Damaceno Ago	7,334	17.28
Independent	Hermel Nuyda	1,797	4.23
Total votes		42,449	100.00
Nacionalista hold			

=== 2010 ===
2010 Philippine House of Representatives elections in Albay
Party	Candidate	Votes	%
Nacionalista	Al Francis Bichara	117,611	58.01
Liberal	Amelia Bonita Apin	58,600	28.90
Independent	Ricardo Ayala	13,214	6.52
Valid ballots		189,425	93.43
Invalid or blank votes		13,326	6.57
Total votes		202,751	100.00
Nacionalista hold			

=== 2013 ===
2013 Philippine House of Representatives elections in Albay
Party	Candidate	Votes	%
Nacionalista	Al Francis Bichara	133,333	69.75
Independent	Walter Magdato	13,133	6.87
Invalid or blank votes		44,681	23.38
Total votes		191,147	100.00
Nacionalista hold			

=== 2016 ===
2016 Philippine House of Representatives elections in Albay
Party	Candidate	Votes	%
Liberal	Joey Salceda	171,339	
Independent	Jose Maria Los Baños	5,518	
Independent	Danilo Maravillas	3,869	
Independent	Josue Joshua Martinez Jr.	3,546	
Independent	Virgilio Goyena	2,051	
Invalid or blank votes		32,611	
Total votes		218,934	100.00
Liberal gain from Nacionalista			

=== 2019 ===
2019 Philippine House of Representatives elections in Albay
Party	Candidate	Votes	%
PDP–Laban	Joey Salceda	187,252	94.64
Independent	Virgilio Goyena	10,603	5.35
Invalid or blank votes		29,560	
Total votes		227,884	
PDP–Laban hold			

=== 2022 ===
2022 Philippine House of Representatives elections in Albay
Party	Candidate	Votes	%
PDP–Laban	Joey Salceda	225,851	94.16
Independent	Virgilio Goyena	5,677	2.37
PLM	Opinyon de Leoz	4,427	1.85
Katipunan	Danilo Maravillas	2,295	0.96
Independent	Domingo Arao	1,614	0.67
Total votes		239,864	100.00
PDP–Laban hold			

=== 2025 ===
2025 Philippine House of Representatives elections in Albay
Party	Candidate	Votes	%
PDP–Laban	Carlos Loria	143,436	50.58
Lakas	Christopher Co	140,126	49.42
Total votes		283,562	100.00
Turnout		296,740	90.64
PDP–Laban gain from Lakas			

== See also ==
- Legislative districts of Albay
