= List of members of the House of Representatives of the Philippines (I) =

This is a complete list of past and present members of the House of Representatives of the Philippines whose last names begin with the letter I.

This list also includes members of the Philippine Assembly (1907–1916), the Commonwealth National Assembly (1935–1941), the Second Republic National Assembly (1943–1944) and the Batasang Pambansa (1978–1986).

- Fidel Ibañez, member for Cavite (1928–1931)
- Agapito Ignacio, member for Rizal's 1st district (1919–1922)
- Rolleo Ignacio, member for Oriental Mindoro (1984–1986)
- Jesus Ilagan, member for Nueva Ecija's 2nd district (1949–1953)
- Luzviminda Ilagan, member for Gabriela party-list (2007–2016)
- Mauricio Ilagan, member for Tarlac's 1st district (1909–1912)
- Eddie Ilarde, member for Rizal's 1st district (1965–1969), and Region IV (1978–1984)
- Carlos Imperial, member for Albay's 2nd district (1907–1909)
- Carlos R. Imperial, member for Albay's 2nd district (1965–1972, 1987–1998, 2001–2007), and Region V (1978–1984)
- Norma Imperial, member for Albay's 2nd district (1998–2000)
- Pedro Insua, member for Tayabas's 1st district (1945–1946)
- Gregorio Ipong, member for Cotabato's 2nd district (1998–2007)
- Clemente Irving, member for Mountain Province (1928–1931)
- Martin Isidro, member for Manila's 1st district (1987–1998)
- Emmanuel Iway, member for Negros Oriental's 1st district (2013–2016, 2025–present)
