= Manito, Albay =

Municipality in Albay, Philippines

Manito
- Municipality
- Municipality of Manito
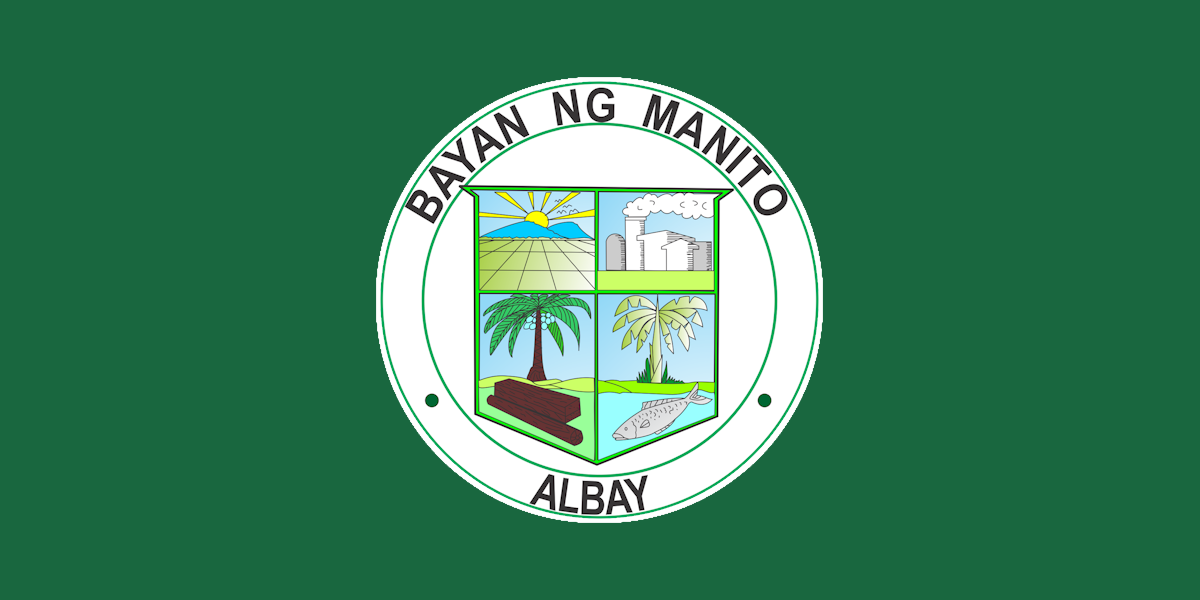
- Flag Seal

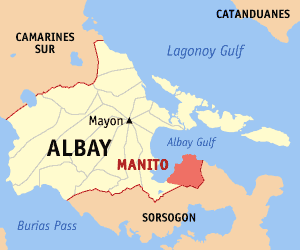
- Map of Albay with Manito highlighted
- Interactive map of Manito
- Location within the Philippines
- Coordinates: 13°07′25″N 123°52′09″E
- Country: Philippines
- Region: Bicol Region
- Province: Albay
- District: 2nd district
- Founded: 1840
- Barangays: 15 (see Barangays)

Government
  - Type: Sangguniang Bayan
  - Mayor: Jerry Arizapa
  - Vice Mayor: Jun Solinap
  - Representative: Caloy Loria
  - Municipal Council: Members: Erwin Daz; William Daen; Badboy Daep; Arly Guiriba; Lorris Jan Balitaon; Nelia Abellano; Mia Asejo; Randy Mardid
  - Electorate: 18,670 voters (2025)

Area
  - Total: 107.40 km^{2} (41.47 sq mi)
- Elevation: 60 m (200 ft)
- Highest elevation: 512 m (1,680 ft)
- Lowest elevation: 0 m (0 ft)

Population (2024 census)
  - Total: 26,425
  - Density: 246.04/km^{2} (637.25/sq mi)
  - Households: 6,133
- Demonym: Manitoeño

Economy
  - Income class: 2nd municipal income class
  - Poverty incidence: 34.42% (2023)
  - Revenue: ₱ 189.9 million (2024)
  - Assets: ₱ 957.4 million (2024)
  - Expenditure: ₱ 90.41 million (2024)
  - Liabilities: ₱ 132 million (2024)

Service provider
  - Electricity: Albay Electric Cooperative (ALECO)
- Time zone: UTC+8 (PST)
- ZIP code: 4514
- PSGC: 0500511000
- IDD : area code: +63 (0)52
- Native languages: Central Bikol; Tagalog
- Catholic diocese: Diocese of Legazpi

Manito, officially the Municipality of Manito (Central Bikol: Banwaan kan Manito; Tagalog: Bayan ng Manito), is a municipality in the province of Albay, Philippines. According to the 2024 census, it has a population of 26,425 people.

It is famous for Nag-aso Lake, also known as the boiling lake, along with several other attractions that draw both local and foreign visitors to the town.

== History ==
The first settlers in the area came from Bacon, Cagraray Island or Casiguran which are geographically situated near Manito. In prehistoric time, the Bicolanos from the above-mentioned places had shown evidence of civilization. Recently artifacts unearthed from this place both by Filipino and foreign anthropologist show that Bicol is indeed inhabited first by Bicolanos, not traders from foreign lands.

The 1818 census showed 240 native families paying tribute and they were coexisting with 4 Spanish-Filipino families in the area.

In 1840, a few settlers the Visayas came and settled in the place near the coast of Manito, because of fear from Moro invaders. They officially established the place and named it Manito, because it was abounding in clinging vine called nito, which belongs to the rattan family and is used as raw material for making baskets. When nito vines are artistically made into baskets, the finished products are natural dark brown in color similar to the color of coffee. The prefix "Ma" means "plenty", then Manito means "plenty of nito".

Later, natives from the neighboring towns of Albay, Bacon, and Rapu-rapu who fled from the Moro raiders found a safer place near the seashore and near the thick west Of Manito. In the past this town was surrounded by thick forest that gave natural fiction — a haven of safety and comfort — to the Visayan settlers. Although they were brave and courageous, they lacked arms and ammunitions to fight the Moros.

In the early years of settlement, the center of this place that soon became the Poblacion had only a few scattered houses. As forests were cut, the cleared areas were planted with abaca and other crops. Due to the abundance of food and money which the people earned through the sale of their forest and agricultural products, Manito became a progressive settlement. But today it is left behind by neighboring towns. Forests are mostly denuded due to cutting in the 1980s, while replanting of trees has been neglected.

== Geography ==
Manito is located at 13°07′25″N 123°52′09″E.

According to the Philippine Statistics Authority, the municipality has a land area of 107.40 square kilometres (41.47 sq mi) constituting 4.17% of the 2,575.77-square-kilometre- (994.51 sq mi) total area of Albay.

Manito is located on the south-eastern tip of Albay, adjoining the south-eastern limit of Legazpi City. The west and NW coast of Manito lies along Poliqui Bay opposite the city of Legazpi. To the north and north-east coast of the municipality lies Albay Gulf. To the east and south of Manito is the province of Sorsogon separated by the Pocdol Mountains, which is also called as the Bacon-Manito Volcanic Complex. Because of topography, the two provinces are not connected along the coast. A mountain pass from barangay Nagotgot connects Manito to Sorsogon City in Sorsogon province.

Southwest of the poblacion is barangay Buyo separated by the Buyo River. The two rivers serve as irrigation for small rice fields and water sources for the residents.

=== Barangays ===
Manito is politically subdivided into 15 barangays. Each barangay consists of puroks and some have sitios.

Currently, there are 14 are classified as rural areas and only the poblacion (town center, also known as Barangay It-ba), is classified as an urban area. The poblacion is situated on the north-western seashore of the town, south of the mouth of the Camanitohan River. Northwest of the town centerk is barangay Cawit, separated by the Caminatohan.

PSGC	Barangay	Population			±% p.a.	
		2024		2010		
050511001	Balabagon	1.9%	507	561	▾	−0.70%
050511002	Balasbas	6.0%	1,581	1,399	▴	0.85%
050511003	Bamban	3.8%	1,010	967	▴	0.30%
050511004	Buyo	15.3%	4,038	3,575	▴	0.85%
050511005	Cabacongan	3.6%	945	946	▾	−0.01%
050511006	Cabit	4.1%	1,093	1,072	▴	0.13%
050511007	Cawayan	6.8%	1,805	1,665	▴	0.56%
050511008	Cawit	3.8%	1,013	1,011	▴	0.01%
050511009	Holugan	4.5%	1,199	1,165	▴	0.20%
050511010	It-ba (Poblacion)	13.6%	3,588	3,192	▴	0.82%
050511011	Malobago	3.6%	958	945	▴	0.09%
050511012	Manumbalay	3.8%	998	812	▴	1.44%
050511013	Nagotgot	9.5%	2,510	2,366	▴	0.41%
050511015	Pawa	8.7%	2,297	2,114	▴	0.58%
050511018	Tinapian	4.4%	1,165	1,029	▴	0.87%
	Total		26,425	22,819	▴	1.02%

=== Climate ===
Climate data for Manito, Albay
Month	Jan	Feb	Mar	Apr	May	Jun	Jul	Aug	Sep	Oct	Nov	Dec	Year
Mean daily maximum °C (°F)	27 (81)	28 (82)	29 (84)	31 (88)	31 (88)	30 (86)	29 (84)	29 (84)	29 (84)	29 (84)	29 (84)	28 (82)	29 (84)
Mean daily minimum °C (°F)	22 (72)	21 (70)	22 (72)	23 (73)	24 (75)	25 (77)	25 (77)	25 (77)	24 (75)	24 (75)	23 (73)	22 (72)	23 (74)
Average precipitation mm (inches)	65 (2.6)	44 (1.7)	42 (1.7)	39 (1.5)	87 (3.4)	150 (5.9)	184 (7.2)	153 (6.0)	163 (6.4)	154 (6.1)	127 (5.0)	100 (3.9)	1,308 (51.4)
Average rainy days	13.9	9.2	11.1	12.5	19.6	24.3	26.5	25.0	25.5	24.4	19.4	15.1	226.5
Source: Meteoblue

== Demographics ==
Population census of Manito
Year	Pop.	±% p.a.
1903	3,798	—
1918	5,205	+2.12%
1939	7,080	+1.48%
1948	7,909	+1.24%
1960	9,746	+1.76%
1970	12,062	+2.15%
1975	13,647	+2.51%
1980	15,416	+2.47%
1990	16,011	+0.38%
1995	18,451	+2.69%
2000	20,420	+2.20%
2007	21,652	+0.81%
2010	22,819	+1.93%
2015	24,707	+1.53%
2020	26,162	+1.21%
2024	26,425	+0.24%
Source: Philippine Statistics Authority

In the 2024 census, Manito had a population of 26,425 people. The population density was 250 per square kilometre (650/sq mi).

== Economy ==
Poverty incidence of Manito (%)

Source: Philippine Statistics Authority

The municipality is a supplier of lasa grass and its final product - soft broom. A significant number of households are engaged in soft broom making as a source of livelihood. Many households are still engaged in cottage industries like basket making in spite of the dwindling supply of nito vines.

In 1982, the municipality of Manito emerged in the limelight by virtue of PD k.20364 establishing Manito as reservation area for Geothermal Exploration and development. In June 1994, the Bacman Geothermal Production Field has started its full operation and in October 1998, President Joseph Estrada inaugurated the additional 1.5 megawatt power/multi-crop drying plant located at Pawa, Manito in support of his food security program.

== Culture ==
=== Town fiesta ===
Saint Raphael the Archangel is the patron saint of Manito where the town fiesta is celebrated every October 24 in his honor.

== Education ==
The Manito Schools District Office governs all educational institutions within the municipality. It oversees the management and operations of all private and public, from primary to secondary schools.

=== Primary and elementary schools ===
- Balabagon Elementary School
- Balasbas Elementary School
- Bamban Elementary School
- Buyo Elementary School
- Cabacongan Elementary School
- Cavit Elementary School
- Cawayan Elementary School
- Hologan Elementary School
- Inang Maharang Elementary School
- Kawit Elementary School
- Malobago Elementary School
- Manito Central School
- Manumbalay Elementary School
- Nagotgot Elementary School
- Pawa Elementary School
- Tinapian Elementary School

=== Secondary schools ===
- Cawayan High School
- Manito National High School
- Nagotgot High School
