= Caloy Loria =

Filipino politician and businessman

Carlos Andes Loria
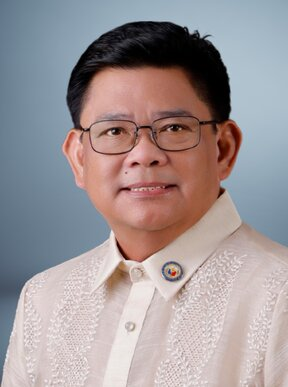
- Official portrait, 2025

Member of the Philippine House of Representatives from Albay's 2nd District
- Incumbent
- Assumed office June 30, 2025
- Preceded by: Joey Salceda

Personal details
- Born: November 12, 1965 (age 60) Legazpi, Albay, Philippines
- Party: NUP (2025–present)
- Other political affiliations: PDP (2024–2025)
- Spouse: Roslyn Loria
- Profession: Businessman, politician

Carlos Andes Loria (born November 12, 1965) is a Filipino businessman and politician currently serving as the representative of the 2nd congressional district of Albay in the House of Representatives of the Philippines. A member of the National Unity Party, he won the seat in the 2025 midterm elections, defeating former Ako Bicol Party-list lawmaker Christopher Co of Lakas–CMD.

== Early life and education ==
Carlos Loria was born on November 12, 1965, in Legazpi City, Albay, Bicol Region, Philippines. He grew up in Barangay Bano, Legazpi City.

== Political career ==
In the 2025 Philippine midterm elections, Loria ran under PDP–Laban and won as representative of Albay's 2nd district.

Following his election, Loria voiced opposition to a controversial ₱1-billion proposal to install artificial lighting at Mayon Volcano, one of the Philippines' most iconic natural landmarks. Instead, he advocated for redirecting the funds toward essential social services, including water access, health care, nutrition, and poverty alleviation programs.

=== As congressman (2025-Present) ===
In the 20th Congress, Rep. Loria filed House Bill No. 2996 to establish a Special Economic Zone in the City of Legaspi for the purpose of Legazpi City Special Economic Zone Authority aimed to accelerate Legazpi City economic transformation by providing a robust legal and institutional framework for promoting investment and creating of employment.

=== House bills filed (20th Congress) ===
Bill No.	Title	Date Filed	Primary Referral	Status
House Bill No. 2998	AN ACT ESTABLISHING MICRO, SMALL, AND MEDIUM ENTERPRISES AND STARTUP INNOVATION HUBS IN THE SECOND DISTRICT OF ALBAY AND APPROPRIATING FUNDS THEREFOR	4 August 2025	Tourism	Pending with the Committee on MICRO, SMALL AND MEDIUM ENTERPRISE DEVELOPMENT since 2025-08-06
House Bill No. 2997	AN ACT DECLARING THE RAPU-RAPU ISLAND IN THE MUNICIPALITY OF RAPU-RAPU, PROVINCE OF ALBAY, AN ECOTOURISM SITE AND APPROPRIATING FUNDS THEREFOR	4 August 2025	Micro, Small and Medium Enterprise Development	Pending with the Committee on TOURISM since 2025-08-06
House Bill No. 2996	AN ACT ESTABLISHING A SPECIAL ECONOMIC ZONE IN THE CITY OF LEGAZPI IN THE PROVINCE OF ALBAY TO BE KNOWN AS THE LEGAZPI SPECIAL ECONOMIC ZONE, CREATING FOR THE PURPOSE THE LEGAZPI SPECIAL ECONOMIC ZONE AUTHORITY, AND APPROPRIATING FUNDS THEREFOR	4 August 2025	Economic Affairs	Pending with the Committee on ECONOMIC AFFAIRS since 2025-08-06

==== Personal life ====
He is married to Roslyn Loria.
