= Carlos R. Imperial =

Filipino lawyer and politician (1930–2010)

The Honorable Carlos del Rosario Imperial
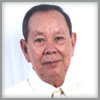
- Official portrait, 2004

Member of the Philippine House of Representatives from Albay's 2nd District
- In office December 30, 1965 – September 23, 1972
- Preceded by: Justino Nuyda
- Succeeded by: Post Abolished (Position next held by Himself)
- In office June 30, 1987 – June 30, 1998
- Preceded by: Post Created
- Succeeded by: Norma B. Imperial
- In office June 30, 2001 – June 30, 2007
- Preceded by: Norma B. Imperial
- Succeeded by: Al Francis Bichara

Member of the Interim Batasang Pambansa
- In office June 12, 1978 – June 5, 1984
- Constituency: Region V

Personal details
- Born: July 15, 1930 Daraga, Albay, Philippine Islands
- Died: April 11, 2010 (aged 79)
- Party: Lakas (2004–2010)
- Other political affiliations: NPC (1992–2004); Independent (1987–1992); KBL (1978–1987); Nacionalista (1965–1978)
- Spouse: Norma B. Imperial
- Education: Ateneo de Manila University; Harvard University

Carlos "Papay" del Rosario Imperial (July 15, 1930 – April 11, 2010) was a 2nd district representative of Albay in the Philippines. He belongs to the Imperial clan of politicians, ambassadors, jurists and executives.

== Early life and education ==
Carlos Imperial was born in Sagpon, Daraga, Albay. His father, Domingo Imperial, became a senator during the American and Commonwealth period. Carlos Imperial finished his elementary and secondary education at Ateneo de Manila University with the degree of Bachelor of Literature in 1951. He took law at the same university where in 1956, he successfully passed the bar examination obtaining the third highest score with a rating of 89.45%. He went on to earn his Master of Law at Harvard University in the United States.

== Political career ==
His political career started when he was elected as the barrio captain of Sagpon in 1963 up to the time he ran for Congress. He became the President of the Association of Barrio Councils of Daraga in 1963.

In 1965, Imperial ran successfully for representative of Albay's 2nd district under the banner of the Nacionalista Party of Senate President Ferdinand Marcos; Imperial was re-elected in 1969. He ran for membership of the Interim Batasang Pambansa representing Region V under the banner of the administration party, the Kilusang Bagong Lipunan, and won. He ran and won as representative of Albay's 2nd district as an Independent Politician in 1987. After his tenure in office, his wife, Norma Imperial, served as representative of the same district. Imperial ran and won again in 2001 and 2004. He lost to Al Francis Bichara during the 2007 election.

== Death ==
Imperial died on April 11, 2010. The Imperials remain an important political family in Albay.
