= Viga, Catanduanes =

Municipality in Catanduanes, Philippines

Viga
- Municipality
- Municipality of Viga
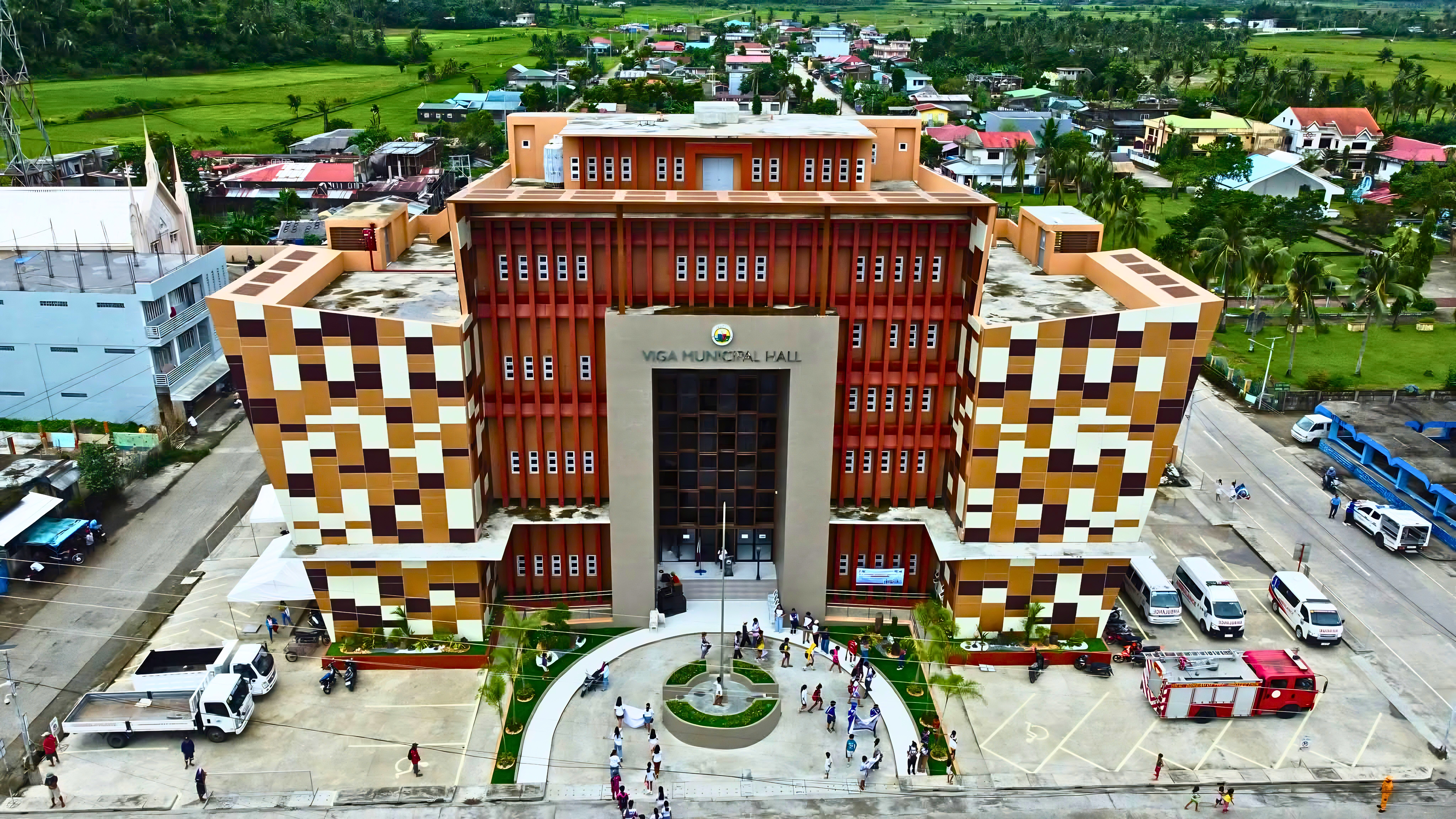
- Viga New Municipal Hall

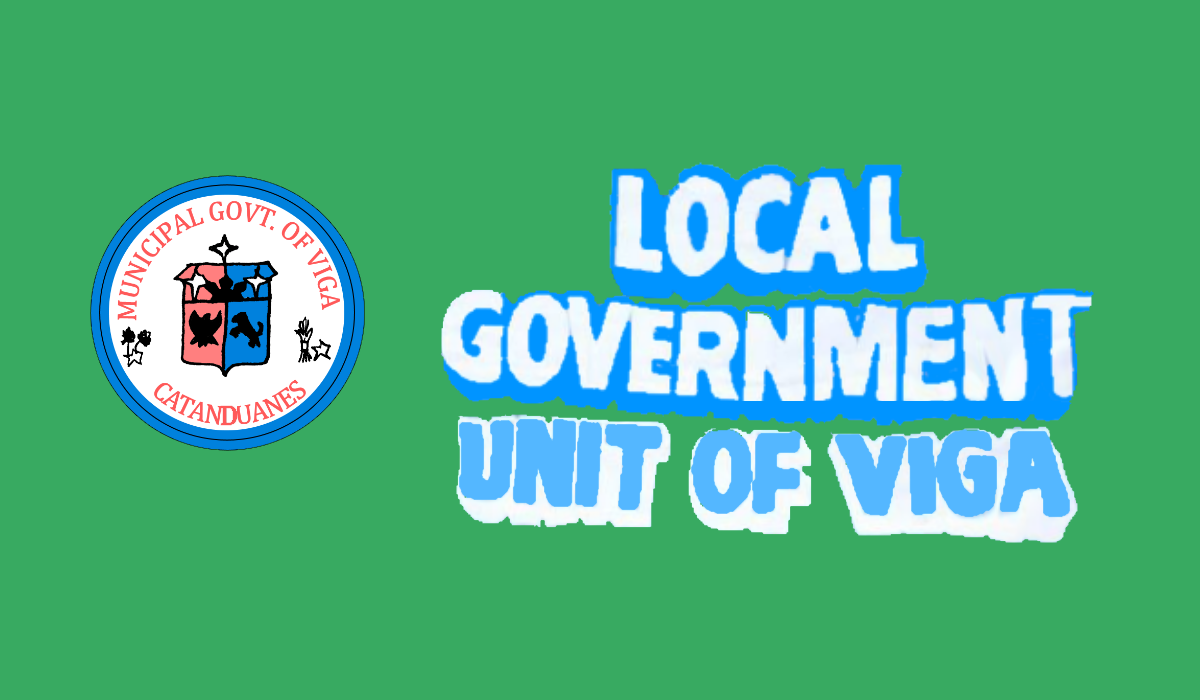
- Flag
- Nickname: Rice Granary of Catanduanes
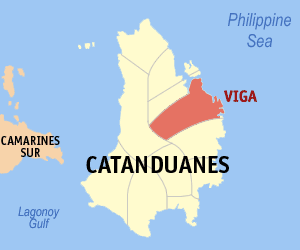
- Map of Catanduanes with Viga highlighted
- Interactive map of Viga
- Location within the Philippines
- Coordinates: 13°52′N 124°18′E
- Country: Philippines
- Region: Bicol Region
- Province: Catanduanes
- District: Lone district
- Founded: 1661
- Barangays: 31 (see Barangays)

Government
  - Type: Sangguniang Bayan
  - Mayor: Jennifer M. Tuplano
  - Vice Mayor: Emeterio M. Tarin
  - Municipal Council: Members: Cesar O. Cervantes; Patrick Ian T. Aquino; Elmo T. Tusi; Willie T. Dulay; Henry O. Olonan; Gener T. Litong; Jasper Adrian T. Sidlacan; Kenneth Francis Odi
  - Electorate: 16,503 voters (2025)

Area
  - Total: 158.23 km^{2} (61.09 sq mi)
- Elevation: 87 m (285 ft)
- Highest elevation: 459 m (1,506 ft)
- Lowest elevation: −1 m (−3.3 ft)

Population (2024 census)
  - Total: 21,364
  - Density: 135.02/km^{2} (349.70/sq mi)
  - Households: 4,896
- Demonym: Viganon

Economy
  - Income class: 3rd municipal income class
  - Poverty incidence: 35.61% (2023)
  - Revenue: ₱ 157.7 million (2024)
  - Assets: ₱ 389.2 million (2024)
  - Expenditure: ₱ 146.8 million (2024)
  - Liabilities: ₱ 137 million (2024)

Service provider
  - Electricity: First Catanduanes Electric Cooperative (FICELCO)
- Time zone: UTC+8 (PST)
- ZIP code: 4805
- PSGC: 0502010000
- IDD : area code: +63 (0)52
- Native languages: Bicol
- Website: www.vigacatanduanes.gov.ph

Viga, officially the Municipality of Viga, is a municipality in the province of Catanduanes, Philippines. According to the 2024 census, it has a population of 21,364 people.

Its locals are known for their skills in crafting wooden boats called balakwitan, used for fishing and transport. They are also known for making sakayan, a small, paddled boats suited for swamp areas.

== History ==
The site of the original settlement of Viga was at Caviga-e now called Viga. It was believed that a group of tribesmen led by "Abines" from the mainland were the first settlers. Due to frequent Moro raids, they fled inland and settled in a place where the primitive inhabitants were akin to the province's pygmies. They called this place "Oco" (now barangay San José (Oco)), meaning short people or dwarf. When the Moro threat diminished, the settlers move to the lowlands where the soil was more fertile. They selected the area where herbaceous giant gabi-like plants which they called "Marviga" grew abundantly. The settlers were of mixed stock as result of the inter-marriages between the natives and the migrating tribesmen.

In the later part of 16th century, a group of Spaniards believed to be a group of Juan de Salcedo’s expedition reached the place and subdued the natives. It then became a Spanish settlement. An Augustinian friar named Francisco Putiocan became the first Catholic Priest and recognized leader. The Spaniards called the settlement "Viga", shortened from "Marviga". This name was subsequently adopted as the official name of the municipality.

During the Spanish colonization, the inhabitants were converted to the Catholic faith. The year 1818 census shows that Eiga (Now Viga) had 647 native families and 3 Spanish-Filipino families.

As time went on they felt however, the strain of Spanish civil rule cruelties, when the Philippine Revolution broke out, many able-bodied natives joined the nationalistic movement and fought the colonizer.

When the Americans came, Viga was virtually liberated from the Spanish rule, civil government was established. When the Second World War broke out, Viga become the center of guerilla movement in the province. A pitched and running battle between the guerillas and escaping Japanese forces were simultaneously fought at Bangguerohan and Cabatangan where the latter was defeated.

In 1951, the barrios of Sicmil and Sioron were transferred to then newly created town of Gigmoto.

== Geography ==
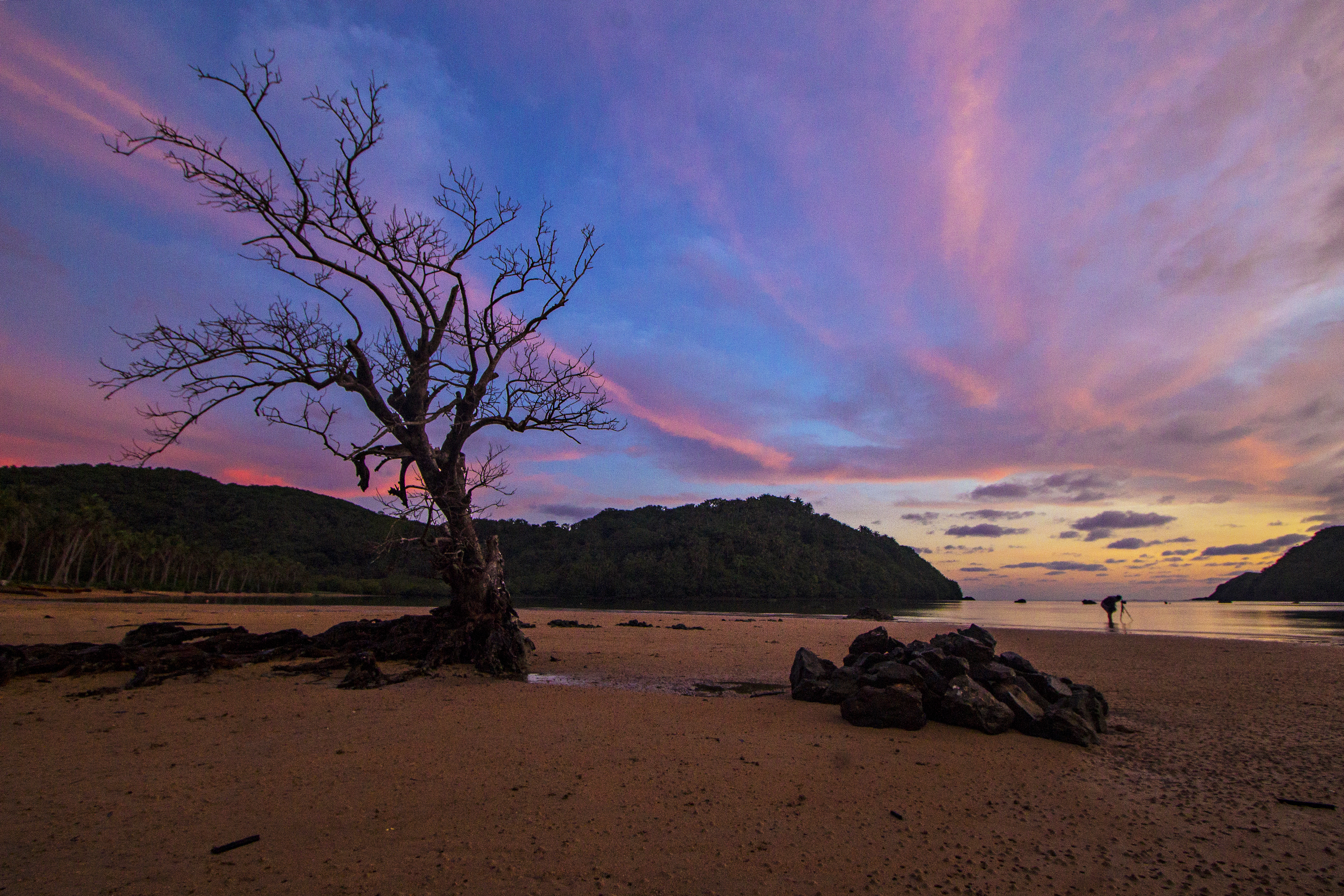
Viga coast

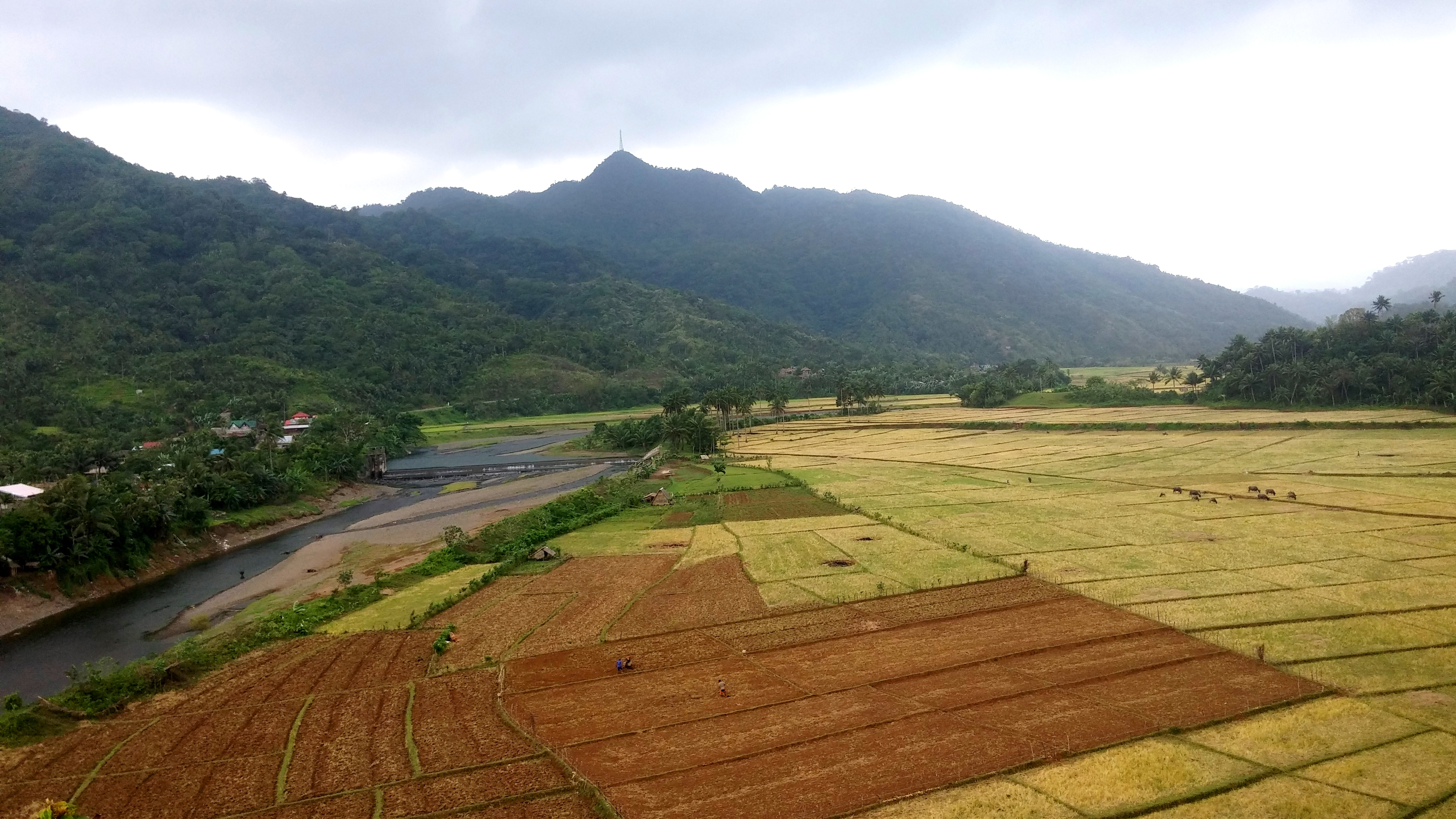
San Jose Oco, Rice Plantation

Viga is one of the eleven towns in the province of Catanduanes, located in the north-eastern portion of the island. It occupies approximately 8.96% of the total land area of the island and 0.0406% of the entire country. It is nestled in one of the widest inland plains of the island, between three neighboring towns and the Philippine Sea. To the south is the town of Gigmoto, to the west is the town of Caramoran. It is 50 kilometres (31 mi) north from the capital town of Virac.

Viga is mostly rugged and mountainous terrain. Its slope characteristics are 29% gently sloping to undulating, 3% classified rolling to hilly, 18% very hills and mountains, 6% level to very gently sloping, 13% steep hills and mountainous, and 13% plains. The prominent mountain forms with important significance include the ranges are Summit and Magsumoso. The largest coastal plain is the contiguous wetlands over which lays the widest area of rice paddies and a vast swamp full of nipa and mangroves.

Viga is an agricultural municipality, considered as the rice granary of the province. The two types of agricultural products raised are the food and export crops. The food crops being raised are palay, corn, banana and other root crops. The export crops are mainly Abaca and coconut. The area planted with these crops and the production derived there from is the principal source of livelihood by the inhabitants.

=== Forest and vegetation ===
Viga is a biodiversity hotspot. Its lush rainforest is home to Philippine brown deer (Rusa marianna), flying foxes, and other endemic bat species, warty pigs, civets, cobras, giant pythons, monitor lizards, sailfin lizards and other endemic animals. Exotic bird species such as Philippine hornbill, rail, parrot, bittern, egret, pheasant, coot, lapwing, plover, Philippine duck, quail, owl, oriole, kingfisher, swiftlets and many more are also found. In fact, a record of "Philippines Birding Trip Reports" has found out many bird species in several portions such as the watershed and timberland forests reserve where scattered deer populations are also usually reported. Unfortunately, one bird subspecies, the Catanduanes Bleeding-heart (Gallicolumba luzonica rubiventris) had experienced over-exploitation in the late 20th century. Although most forests are still intact, this species has suffered over-hunting. It is very rare and believed to be near extinction or already extinct as its last reported specimen was collected in 1971.

The Southern giant slender-tailed cloud rat (budkon/bugkon) which is found only in Catanduanes and the southern half of Luzon Island, is still widely reported. It is critically endangered as humans hunt them for food and for some extent, as pets. In mainland Luzon, sightings of this wonderful creature is already rare while in Marinduque, it is generally considered extinct.

=== Flora and fauna ===
The Catanduanes narrow-mouthed frog (Kaloula kokacii), an arboreal amphibian which is found only in Catanduanes and some parts of Bicol, enjoys its diversity but being carefully monitored. Clearing of some forests may pose a threat to amphibian species. An amphibian Hylarana similis is found only in Catanduanes and Luzon islands. One of the very recent species found in Catanduanes and portions of Bicol region is the new loam-swimming skink, a legless reptile with its assigned scientific name Brachymelesmakusog. The rich dipterocarp forest also harbors numerous tropical plant species including the threatened species of pitcher plants and rafflesia as well as endemic banana varieties. Many highly valuable hardwood trees such as yakal, apitong, palosapis, and molave are still found in the forests though local reports indicate that these species are already threatened. Mangrove forests exist in several coastal areas, but the largest locations are in Banquerohan (Viga-Panganiban).

=== Marine diversity ===
The marine environment of Viga is also ecologically rich as its terrestrial zones. Coastal reefs harbor many endangered and threatened types of mollusks such as giant Triton, cowries, abalone, cone snails, conches, octopuses, squids, and nautiluses. Marine mammals are also reported to frequent on its coasts such as species of dolphins and whales which appear in March–June. Many edible marine algae such as caulerpa, valonia, and turbellaria also grow abundantly on its rough coasts. Viga is nestled in the very beginning of the Kuroshio Current; a sea current that runs through Eastern Philippines, Taiwan and Japan. This current performs an array of physical and biological functions in countless marine life like migration and breeding. This explains why migratory fish tracks are usually encountered in its waters. Tuna migration can be seen on its peak in the months of April and May. Dugongs were once known to swim on coasts but this event is already becoming extremely rare.

Viga coast is one of the best spots for flying fish population; a flying fish can attain its fullest size which may weigh 300 grams (11 ounces). Rabbitfish, a kind of reef fish is one of the most heavily exploited marine tropical fish in the locality. Its fry that comes out in shallow coasts during the breeding season (March–May) are fished in large volumes. Approximately 10 million rabbitfish fries are caught annually. That natural event supplies food for many people but its ecological impact can be devastating. Nature advocates started to strengthen their campaign for an eco-dialogue for this matter. Sea cucumbers are also known to be abundant in many islets of the eastern coasts facing the Pacific Ocean.

=== Climate ===
Climate data for Viga
Month	Jan	Feb	Mar	Apr	May	Jun	Jul	Aug	Sep	Oct	Nov	Dec	Year
Mean daily maximum °C (°F)	29.0 (84.2)	29.4 (84.9)	30.2 (86.4)	31.1 (88.0)	32.0 (89.6)	32.3 (90.1)	32.0 (89.6)	31.9 (89.4)	31.9 (89.4)	31.1 (88.0)	30.4 (86.7)	29.4 (84.9)	30.9 (87.6)
Daily mean °C (°F)	25.3 (77.5)	25.5 (77.9)	26.1 (79.0)	26.9 (80.4)	27.8 (82.0)	28.1 (82.6)	27.9 (82.2)	27.8 (82.0)	27.7 (81.9)	27.0 (80.6)	26.7 (80.1)	25.9 (78.6)	26.9 (80.4)
Mean daily minimum °C (°F)	21.7 (71.1)	21.6 (70.9)	22.0 (71.6)	22.8 (73.0)	23.6 (74.5)	23.9 (75.0)	23.8 (74.8)	23.8 (74.8)	23.5 (74.3)	23.0 (73.4)	23.0 (73.4)	22.5 (72.5)	22.9 (73.3)
Average rainfall mm (inches)	384 (15.1)	301 (11.9)	286 (11.3)	146 (5.7)	200 (7.9)	224 (8.8)	302 (11.9)	210 (8.3)	318 (12.5)	635 (25.0)	858 (33.8)	691 (27.2)	4,555 (179.4)
Source: Climate-Data.org

Viga has a tropical rainforest climate (Af) with heavy to very heavy rainfall year-round and with extremely heavy rainfall in November and December.

=== Barangays ===
Viga is politically subdivided into 31 barangays. Each barangay consists of puroks and some have sitios.

==== Poblacion Barangays ====
- Asuncion Poblacion
- Peñafrancia Poblacion
- San Isidro Poblacion
- San Jose Poblacion
- San Pedro Poblacion
- San Roque Poblacion
- San Vicente Poblacion †

==== Interior Barangays ====
- Almojuela
- Burgos
- Del Pilar
- Osmeña
- Pedro Vera (Summit)
- Quezon
- Rizal
- Roxas
- Sagrada
- San Jose Oco †

==== Coastal Barangays ====
- Ananong
- Batohonan
- Begonia
- Botinagan
- Buenavista
- Mabini
- Magsaysay
- Ogbong
- Quirino (Abugan)
- Santa Rosa
- Soboc
- Tambongon †
- Tinago
- Villa Aurora

Barangay	Population				Income Class	
	(2015)		(2010)	(2007)		
Almojuela		3.0%	651	556	523	Rural
Ananong	1.9%	409	424	407	Rural	
Asuncion Poblacion	2.6%	556	533	456	Rural	
Batohonan	0.9%	198	180	169	Rural	
Begonia	3.1%	675	653	361	Rural	
Botinagan	1.3%	273	299	307	Rural	
Buenavista	3.6%	779	753	695	Rural	
Burgos	4.6%	1,003	962	904	Rural	
Del Pilar	1.7%	366	360	306	Rural	
Mabini	1.8%	396	382	287	Rural	
Magsaysay	2.8%	612	566	529	Rural	
Ogbong	4.8%	1,042	1,006	844	Rural	
Osmeña	2.0%	422	368	340	Rural	
Pedro Vera (Summit)	6.6%	1,427	1,248	1,156	Rural	
Peñafrancia Poblacion	1.6%	354	339	334	Rural	
Quezon	3.7%	797	714	694	Rural	
Quirino (Abugan)	1.2%	255	228	208	Rural	
Rizal	6.1%	1,329	1,274	1,295	Rural	
Roxas	2.7%	581	541	208	Rural	
Sagrada	3.1%	666	626	659	Rural	
San Isidro Poblacion	1.3%	284	333	311	Rural	
San Jose Poblacion	4.0%	870	909	833	Rural	
San Jose (Oco)	5.5%	1,183	1,163	1,040	Rural	
San Pedro Poblacion	2.6%	571	550	569	Rural	
San Roque Poblacion	3.8%	829	728	656	Rural	
San Vicente Poblacion	3.7%	800	728	684	Rural	
Santa Rosa	2.9%	634	604	559	Rural	
Soboc	4.0%	869	852	713	Rural	
Tambongon	5.4%	1,163	1,190	1,066	Rural	
Tinago	5.0%	1,080	1,058	1,073	Rural	
Villa Aurora	2.5%	550	543	521	Rural	
Viga Municipality	8.3%	21,624	20,669	19,266	4th Class	

== Demographics ==
Population census of Viga
Year	Pop.	±% p.a.
1903	3,938	—
1918	13,424	+8.52%
1939	11,232	−0.85%
1948	11,000	−0.23%
1960	20,880	+5.49%
1970	14,839	−3.35%
1975	16,063	+1.60%
1980	15,863	−0.25%
1990	16,270	+0.25%
1995	18,569	+2.51%
2000	18,105	−0.54%
2007	19,266	+0.86%
2010	20,669	+2.59%
2015	21,624	+0.86%
2020	22,869	+1.19%
2024	21,364	−1.62%
Source: Philippine Statistics Authority

In the 2024 census, the population of Viga was 21,364 people, with a density of 140 inhabitants per square kilometre or 360 inhabitants per square mile.

== Economy ==
Poverty incidence of Viga (%)

Source: Philippine Statistics Authority

Viga is an agricultural municipality, considered as the rice granary of the province. The two types of agricultural products raised are food and export crops. The food crops raised are palay, corn, banana and other root crops. The export crops are mainly Abaca and coconut. The area planted with these crops and the production derived there from is the principal source of livelihood by the inhabitants.

== Education ==
There are two schools district offices which govern all educational institutions within the municipality. They oversee the management and operations of all private and public, from primary to secondary schools. These are the:

- Viga East Schools District
- Viga West Schools District

=== Primary and elementary schools ===
List of public elementary schools in Viga

School ID	Name of School	Year Established	Location	District	Curricular Class	Class Organization
113317	Almojuela Elementary School	1978	Almojuela	Viga West	Kinder & Elementary	Combined Monograde and Multigrade
113318	Ananong Elementary School	1947	Ananong	Viga East	Kinder & Elementary	Combined Monograde and Multigrade
113307	Batohonan Elementary School	1983	Batohonan	Viga East	Kinder & Elementary	Multigrade
113308	Begonia Elementary School	1972	Begonia	Viga East	Kinder & Elementary	Monograde
113309	Botinagan Elementary School	2002	Botinagan	Viga East	Kinder & Elementary	Combined Monograde and Multigrade
113310	Buenavista Elementary School	1965	Buenavista	Viga East	Kinder & Elementary	Monograde
113319	Burgos Elementary School	1920	Burgos	Viga West	Kinder & Elementary	Monograde
113320	Del Pilar Elementary School	1972	Del Pilar	Viga West	Kinder & Elementary	Combined Monograde and Multigrade
113321	Mabini Elementary School	1963	Mabini	Viga West	Kinder & Elementary	Combined Monograde and Multigrade
113311	Magsaysay Elementary School	1966	Magsaysay	Viga East	Kinder & Elementary	Monograde
113322	Ogbong Elementary School	1948	Ogbong	Viga West	Kinder & Elementary	Monograde
113323	Osmeña Elementary School	1984	Osmeña	Viga West	Kinder & Elementary	Combined Monograde and Multigrade
113324	P. Vera Elementary School	1963	P. Vera	Viga West	Kinder & Elementary	Combined Monograde and Multigrade
113325	Quezon Elementary School	1972	Quezon	Viga West	Kinder & Elementary	Monograde
113312	Quirino Elementary School	1971	Quirino (Abugan)	Viga East	Kinder & Elementary	Combined Monograde and Multigrade
113326	Rizal Elementary School	1993	Rizal	Viga West	Kinder & Elementary	Monograde
113327	Roxas Elementary School	1968	Roxas	Viga West	Kinder & Elementary	Combined Monograde and Multigrade
113328	Sagrada Elementary School	1945	Sagrada	Viga West	Kinder & Elementary	Monograde
113329	San Jose (Oco) Elementary School	1940	San Jose (Oco)	Viga West	Kinder & Elementary	Monograde
113330	San Roque Elementary School	1970	San Roque	Viga West	Kinder & Elementary	Monograde
174011	San Vicente Elementary School	2002	San Vicente	Viga West	Elementary	Monograde
113313	Soboc Elementary School	2008	Soboc	Viga East	Kinder & Elementary	Monograde
113331	Santa Rosa Elementary School	1975	Santa Rosa	Viga West	Kinder & Elementary	Monograde
113332	Summit Elementary School	1965	Summit	Viga West	Kinder & Elementary	Combined Monograde and Multigrade
113314	Tambongon Central Elementary School	1928	Tambongon	Viga East	Kinder & Elementary	Monograde
113315	Tinago Elementary School	1919	Tinago	Viga East	Kinder & Elementary	Monograde
113333	Viga Central Elementary School	1936	San Pedro Pob.	Viga West	Kinder & Elementary	Monograde
113316	Villa Aurora Elementary School	1948	Villa Aurora	Viga East	Kinder & Elementary	Combined Monograde and Multigrade

=== Secondary schools ===
The table below contains the list of all the public senior high schools found in Catanduanes published by the Department of Education or DepEd. Included on the list are the municipalities, school ID, school names, and program offerings.

List of public/national high schools in Viga

School ID	Name of School	Year Established	Location	District	Education	Programs	Specialization
302097	San Jose National High School	1967	San Jose (Oco)	Viga West	Senior High	General Academic Strand & Technical Vocational Livelihood	Cookery (NCII), Bread and Pastry Production (NC II), Food and Beverage Services (NC II)
302104	Tambognon National High School	1988	Tambongon	Viga East	Senior High	General Academic Strand & Technical Vocational Livelihood	Bread and Pastry Production (NC II), Cookery (NC II), Housekeeping (NC II), Carpentry (NC II)
302105	Tinago National High School	1972	Tinago	Viga East	-	-	-
302107	Viga Rural Development High School	1972	San Vicente Pob.	Viga West	Senior High	Science, Technology, Engineering, and Mathematics; Accountancy, Business, and Management; & Technical Vocational Livelihood	Electrical Installation and Maintenance (NC II), Hairdressing (NC II), Bread and Pastry Production (NC II), Beauty/ Nail Care (NC II)
