= San Andres, Catanduanes =

Municipality in Catanduanes, Philippines

San Andres Calolbon
- Municipality
- Municipality of San Andres
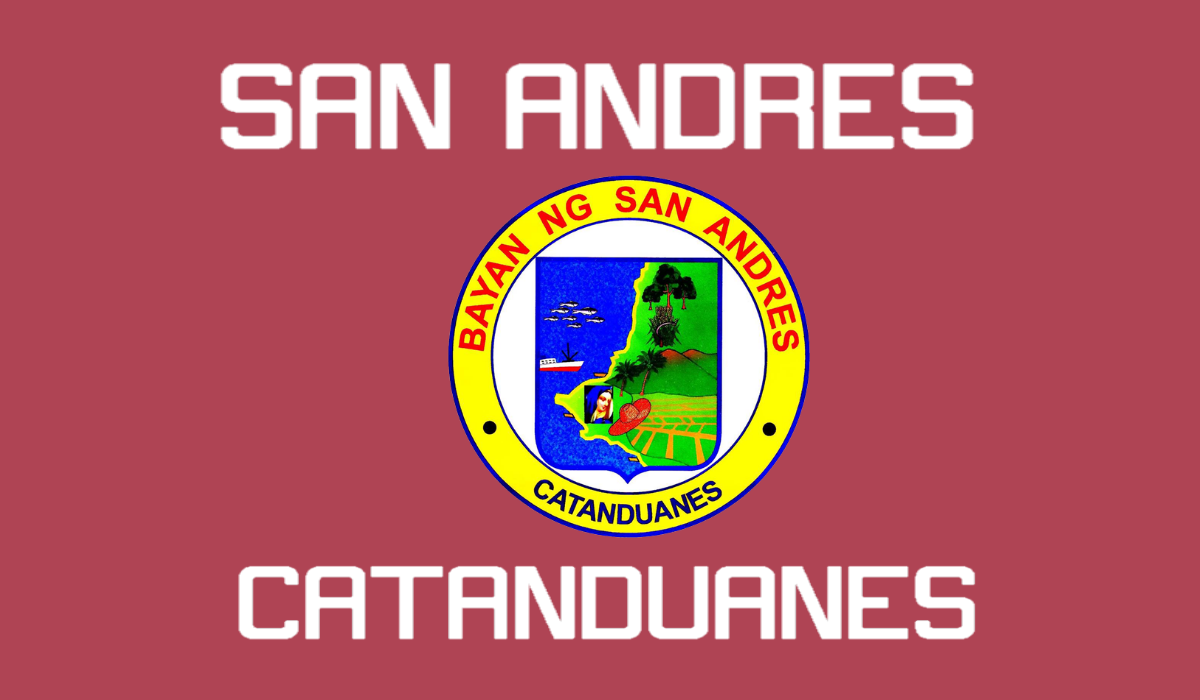
- Flag
- Motto: Calolbon Mahalon. Lalong Pauswagon!
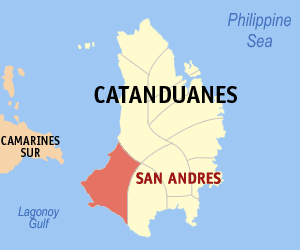
- Map of Catanduanes with San Andres highlighted
- Interactive map of San Andres
- Location within the Philippines
- Coordinates: 13°35′46″N 124°05′57″E
- Country: Philippines
- Region: Bicol Region
- Province: Catanduanes
- District: Lone district
- Founded: 1853
- Named for: St. Andrew the Apostle
- Barangays: 38 (see Barangays)

Government
  - Type: Sangguniang Bayan
  - Mayor: Aly T. Romano
  - Vice Mayor: Felix Romero Jr.
  - Representative: Eulogio R. Rodriguez
  - Municipal Council: Members: Kevin Sernatinger; Joal Cocsin; Alan S. del Valle; Andrew Facundo; San Flores; Leo Martin Mendoza; Jenor Sollegue; Delia Lazaro
  - Electorate: 28,792 voters (2025)

Area
  - Total: 167.31 km^{2} (64.60 sq mi)
- Highest elevation: 579 m (1,900 ft)
- Lowest elevation: 0 m (0 ft)

Population (2024 census)
  - Total: 37,157
  - Density: 222.08/km^{2} (575.20/sq mi)
  - Households: 8,843

Economy
  - Income class: 2nd municipal income class
  - Poverty incidence: 28.52% (2023)
  - Revenue: ₱ 192.1 million (2024)
  - Assets: ₱ 505.7 million (2024)
  - Expenditure: ₱ 176.3 million (2024)
  - Liabilities: ₱ 66.31 million (2024)

Service provider
  - Electricity: First Catanduanes Electric Cooperative (FICELCO)
- Time zone: UTC+8 (PST)
- ZIP code: 4810
- PSGC: 0502008000
- IDD : area code: +63 (0)52
- Native languages: Central Bikol; Tagalog
- Website: www.sanandres-catanduanes.gov.ph

San Andres, officially the Municipality of San Andres, is a municipality in the province of Catanduanes, Philippines. According to the 2024 census, it has a population of 37,157 people.

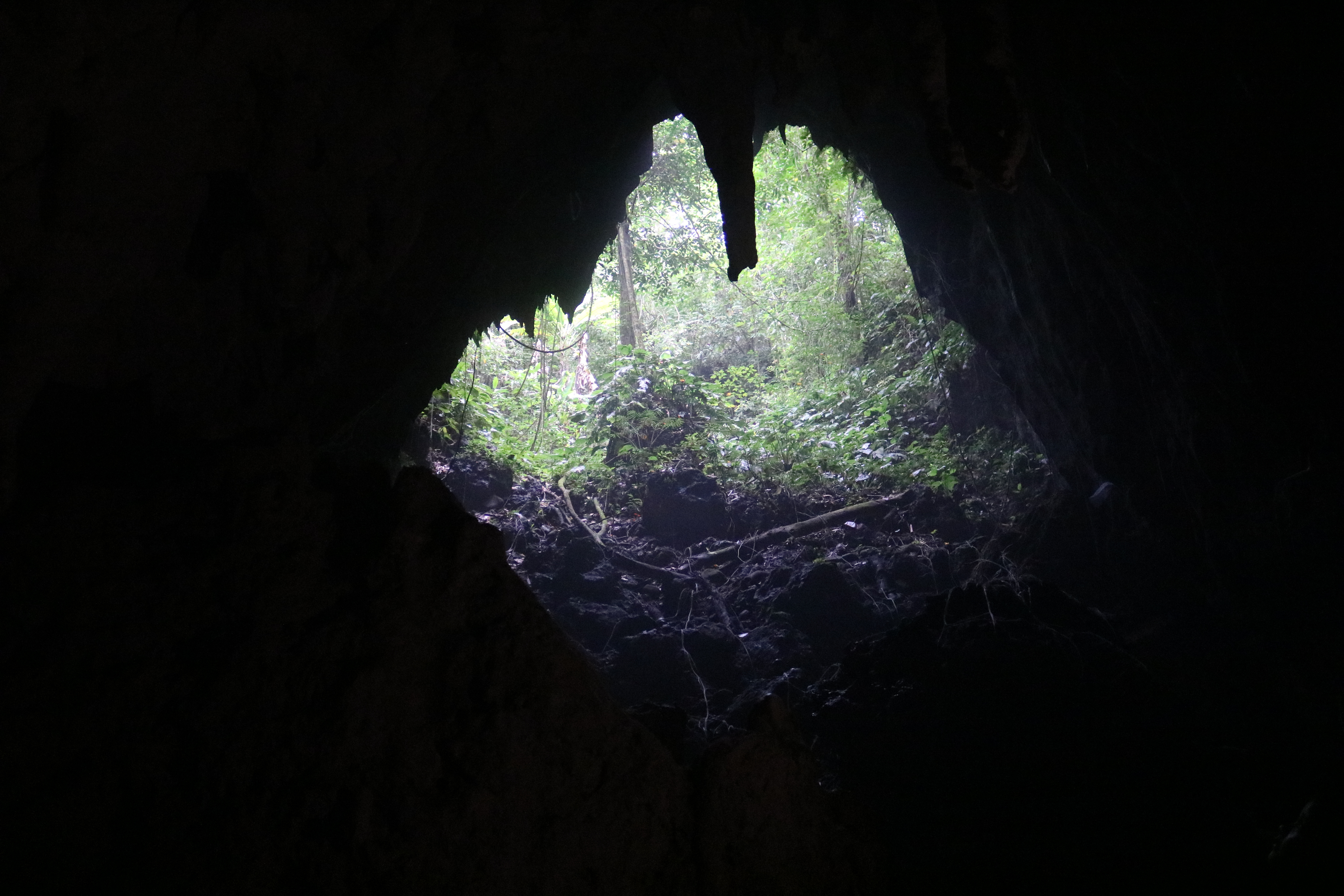
Luyang Cave

It is formerly known as Calolbon.

== History ==
=== Spanish Era ===
The town's first leader on record was Juan Gazang who served for eight years between 1798 and 1806, with the exception of three other capitans- Cristobal (1806), Felix Santelices (1835–1842) and Teodoro Santelices (1843–1847) -the rest served two terms. The last captain was Alipio Vargas (1899–1900). The year 1818 census shows that Calolbon (Now San Andres) had 847 native families and 3 Spanish-Filipino families.

=== American Era ===
The American Era started with a controversial municipal president, Deogracias Belmonte (1901–1903). He was branded as pro-American by the insurrectos headed by Comandante Florencio Eras. Belmonte was almost beheaded on December 8, 1899, in the cemetery of Pandan, Catanduanes. However, the father of then Senator Jose O. Vera saved him from execution.

The term "Municipal President" for town heads was last used by Roberto Iñigo (1931–1935).

During the Commonwealth of the Philippines, the town head of Calolbon was Emiliano Surban (1935–1937) who was the first to assume the title of "Municipal Mayor".

=== World War II ===
Felizardo Santelices was appointed mayor of Calolbon (in 1944–1946) by President Jose P. Laurel.

During the WWII Japanese invasion, Santelices experienced a brutal and almost fatal eventuality. It began on October 5, 1944, when a Japanese tora-tora plane was forced to land on a rice field near the town center. Santelices conducted an inquiry, and although his first urge was to kill the pilot, he sent him instead to the Japanese headquarters in Virac, the capital of Catanduanes, to avoid potential disaster. He knew that Philippine troops and recognized guerrillas would have killed the pilot themselves, and the Japanese reprisal would have been a merciless burning of the town and surrounding areas as well as a massacre of civilians.

The Japanese thanked Santelices for returning the pilot, but the Philippine Commonwealth troops and the recognized guerrillas, accusing him of being pro-Japanese, had the mayor arrested and brought to trial. He was convicted and sentenced to die and to be interred with a Japanese pilot who made a forced landing in the province of Camarines Sur. The condemned Japanese aviator was decapitated first, and Santelices was then placed on the execution block. Seconds before the sword was lowered, the wife of the slayer cried out: "Save him...save him... save him! he is an innocent man!" So, Santelices was freed.

Major Salvador Rodolfo organized the Catanduanes Liberation Forces. It was the backbone of the resistance movement in Catanduanes. It performed numerous ambuscades against the Japanese Imperial Army and conducted intelligence gathering, which was necessary in paving the way for the eventual liberation of the province by the combined American and Filipino troops. During his exploits as a guerilla leader, Rodolfo was rumored several times to have been killed in battle but time and again he keeps on coming back to destroy every vestige of enemy control in the province of Catanduanes, hence he was called “Phantom” or the Man who never dies.

On February 8, 1945, when Rodolfo was about to declare the independence of the province after he and his men killed every Japanese Imperial Army and burned every Japanese garrison in Catanduanes, one of his men approached him and said that there were Japanese reinforcements on board 2 vessels approaching the island. He then talked to his men, most of whom were wounded and exhausted, he said: "Japanese reinforcements are coming. I have two options for you, we can go to the hills and save ourselves and wait there until the Americans arrive, but I assure you that all civilians left behind will be massacred by the incoming Japanese, or we can repeat what happened in the Battle of Thermopylae and stand our ground. Most of us will die, but we will live forever in the pages of history as the men who fought for the liberation of Catanduanes".

With that, everybody decided to stand their ground and fight the incoming Japanese. They went to their posts to wait for the enemy's arrival but then, as if by providence, American planes arrived and bombed the Japanese vessels. Rodolfo declared independence of the entire province on February 8, 1945.

=== Post War Era ===
After Philippine independence in 1946 and Catanduanes became an independent province, the first elected municipal mayor of Calolbon was Jose B. Surban (1947–1948). He was followed by Jose de la Providencia (1948–1951) Francisco Imperial (1952–1955) and Aristeo Arcilla (1956–1963).

During the term of Augusto T. Antonio (1964–1979), Calolbon was wired for electricity, and the town's infrastructure was greatly improved. Augusto T. Antonio was succeeded by Antonio Romano, MD (1980–1986) and then by Pedro Surban (1986–1987) as "Officer in Charge" of the town.

Surban was succeeded by Lydia T. Romano (1987–1995), the first woman ever elected as mayor of Calolbon. Then Joseph Cua succeeded her. After Cua, Dr. Aly Romano, the son of ex-mayors Antonio and Lydia Romano was elected mayor. Then Leo Mendoza succeeded him in 2007. In the 2010 Elections, Dr. Antonio Romano won the mayoral post again after defeating Mendoza with a margin of 1,000 plus votes. Peter C. Cua succeeded Romano in 2013.

=== Republic Act No. 3948 ===
In 1964, a bill was presented to the Philippine Congress to rename the town San Andres in honor of its patron, Saint Andrew the Apostle. This bill was approved as Republic Act No. 3948 on June 18 that same year.

Many Calolbonganons loved the old name, a name used since time immemorial and unique to the entire archipelago. They were upset that there had never been a referendum vote.

"The change of Calolbon to San Andres without consulting the townspeople", said one outspoken native, "is a rape of democracy." But for those who were deeply religious and very much devoted to St. Andrew, the change from Calolbon to San Andres was no different from changing a pagan name to a Christian one.

== Geography ==
San Andres is 18 kilometres (11 mi) from the provincial capital town Virac.

=== Barangays ===
San Andres is subdivided into 38 barangays. Each barangay consists of puroks and some have sitios.

- Agojo
- Alibuag
- Asgad (Juan M. Alberto)
- Bagong Sirang
- Barihay
- Batong Paloway
- Belmonte (Poblacion)
- Bislig
- Bon-ot
- Cabungahan
- Cabcab
- Carangag
- Catagbacan
- Codon
- Comagaycay
- Datag
- Divino Rostro (Poblacion)
- Esperanza (Poblacion)
- Hilawan
- Lictin
- Lubas
- Manambrag
- Mayngaway
- Palawig
- Puting Baybay
- Rizal
- Salvacion (Poblacion)
- San Isidro
- San Jose
- San Roque (Poblacion)
- San Vicente
- Santa Cruz (Poblacion)
- Sapang Palay (Poblacion)
- Tibang
- Timbaan
- Tominawog
- Wagdas (Poblacion)
- Yocti

=== Climate ===
Climate data for San Andres, Catanduanes
Month	Jan	Feb	Mar	Apr	May	Jun	Jul	Aug	Sep	Oct	Nov	Dec	Year
Mean daily maximum °C (°F)	27 (81)	27 (81)	28 (82)	30 (86)	31 (88)	30 (86)	29 (84)	29 (84)	29 (84)	29 (84)	28 (82)	27 (81)	29 (84)
Mean daily minimum °C (°F)	22 (72)	22 (72)	23 (73)	24 (75)	25 (77)	25 (77)	25 (77)	25 (77)	25 (77)	24 (75)	24 (75)	23 (73)	24 (75)
Average precipitation mm (inches)	138 (5.4)	83 (3.3)	74 (2.9)	50 (2.0)	108 (4.3)	165 (6.5)	202 (8.0)	165 (6.5)	190 (7.5)	186 (7.3)	188 (7.4)	183 (7.2)	1,732 (68.3)
Average rainy days	16.8	11.9	13.5	13.8	20.5	25.2	27.4	26.2	26.1	24.7	20.7	18.5	245.3
Source: Meteoblue

== Demographics ==
Population census of San Andres
Year	Pop.	±% p.a.
1903	5,783	—
1918	9,080	+3.05%
1939	14,398	+2.22%
1948	17,370	+2.11%
1960	19,083	+0.79%
1970	23,885	+2.27%
1975	24,848	+0.80%
1980	25,072	+0.18%
1990	26,727	+0.64%
1995	30,242	+2.34%
2000	31,463	+0.85%
2007	33,781	+0.99%
2010	35,779	+2.11%
2015	36,779	+0.53%
2020	38,480	+0.96%
2024	37,157	−0.84%
Source: Philippine Statistics Authority

In the 2024 census, the population of San Andres was 37,157 people, with a density of 220 inhabitants per square kilometre or 570 inhabitants per square mile.

== Religion ==
In 1989, according to the Catholic Directory of the Philippines published by the Catholic Bishops' Conference of the Philippines (CBCP), the town of San Andres had a total population of 18,369, the majority of which were Roman Catholic. Others belonged to diverse religious denominations that include Jehovah's Witnesses, the Iglesia ni Cristo, the Church of Jesus Christ of Latter-day Saints, as well as born-again and Fundamentalist Protestant groups.

The entire town of Calolbon was originally under the jurisdiction of Saint Andrew the Apostle Parish. In the early 1950s, however, Saint Isidore Parish was established in the large neighborhood of Manambrag, and now includes all of the farming community of San Andres plus some barrios from outlying areas of the town. Saint Andrew the Apostle Church currently hosts has a number of Pious Associations, many of which are dedicated to the Blessed Virgin Mary.

=== Clergy ===
Rev. Fr. Cornelio de Jesús (1798–1892) was the first recorded parish priest. He ministered to the town's spiritual needs for 29 years. He was responsible for founding the parish church, which was partially constructed of limestone, and he chose Saint Andrew as its titular patron since most people in Calolbon were fishermen.

The priests who saw the end of the Spanish Rule and the advent of the American Era was Rev. Fr. Pío Imperial (1893–1902). During the next two decades, two dynamic clerics guided and strengthened the Catholic faithful of this town. They were Rev. Fr. Roberto Floranza (1910–1920) and Rev. Fr. Dominiciano Camu (1920–1930). Fr. Floranza concretely improved the church building, as it was badly damaged by a typhoon a month before he assumed his office as cura of the town. Floranza was a talented musician who organized a liturgical choir that was often invited to perform at social gatherings such as biladas and dotocas and at other public events.

=== Our Lady of Sorrows of Paloway ===
Most Rev. Manolo A. de los Santos, the Bishop of Virac, said that the Catholic Bishops' Conference of the Philippines confirmed on June 13, 2008, the existence of a miraculous "growing" century-old stone (now 3 inches in height) in Paloway, San Andres, Catanduanes, Bicol. The stone bears the image of the Blessed Virgin Mary as Our Lady of Sorrows and is said to heal illnesses: “What is unexplainable is not that the stone grew in size over the years, but the fact that the image of the Virgin was never distorted as it grew." Called Batong Paloway ("Stone of Paloway"), it enshrined above the altar of the chapel of Our Lady of Sorrows, a "de facto shrine" in Barangay Paloway.

The image on the stone is actually "Our Lady of the Finger" (Nuestra Señora del Dedo), as it shows Mary pointing her right index finger to the left from underneath her cloak. Originally a Spanish depiction, the title was little known in the Philippines at the time of the stone's discovery, leading the people to associate the Paloway icon with the more familiar Our Lady of Sorrows.

The Church has no official statement on the devotion to the icon, but it does not hinder it. Every Friday, a Mass is being celebrated in Paloway Chapel for the benefit of devotees. On the evening of Maundy Thursday, youth from neighboring parishes go on pilgrimage to visit the icon.

== Economy ==
Poverty incidence of San Andres (%)

Source: Philippine Statistics Authority

== Education ==
There are two schools district offices which govern all educational institutions within the municipality. They oversee the management and operations of all private and public, from primary to secondary schools. These are the:

- San Andres East Schools District
- San Andres West Schools District

=== Primary and elementary school ===
- Agojo Elementary School
- Alibuag Elementary School
- Bagong Sirang Elementary School
- Barihay Elementary School
- Batong Paloway Elementary School
- Bislig Elementary School
- Bon-ot Elementary School
- Cabcab Central Elementary School
- Cabungahan Elementary School
- Caragñag Elementary School
- Catagbacan Elementary School
- Catanduanes Praise Oriented School
- Codon Elementary School
- Comagaycay Elementary School
- Datag Elementary School
- JMA (Asgad) Elementary School
- Hilawan Elementary School
- Jose Rizal Elementary School
- Manambrag Elementary School
- Maygnaway Elementary School
- Palawig Elementary School
- Puting Baybay Elementary School
- San Andres Central Elementary School
- San Isidro Elementary School
- San Jose Elementary School
- San Vicente Elementary School
- Tibang Elementary School
- Timbaan Elementary School
- Tominawog Elementary School
- Yocti Elementary School

=== Secondary school ===
- Cabcab National High School
- Codon National High School
- Lictin Integrated School
- Manambrag National High School
- Mayngaway National High School
- San Andres Vocational School

== See also ==
- List of renamed cities and municipalities in the Philippines
