= Pandan, Catanduanes =

Municipality in the Philippines

Pandan
- Municipality
- Municipality of Pandan
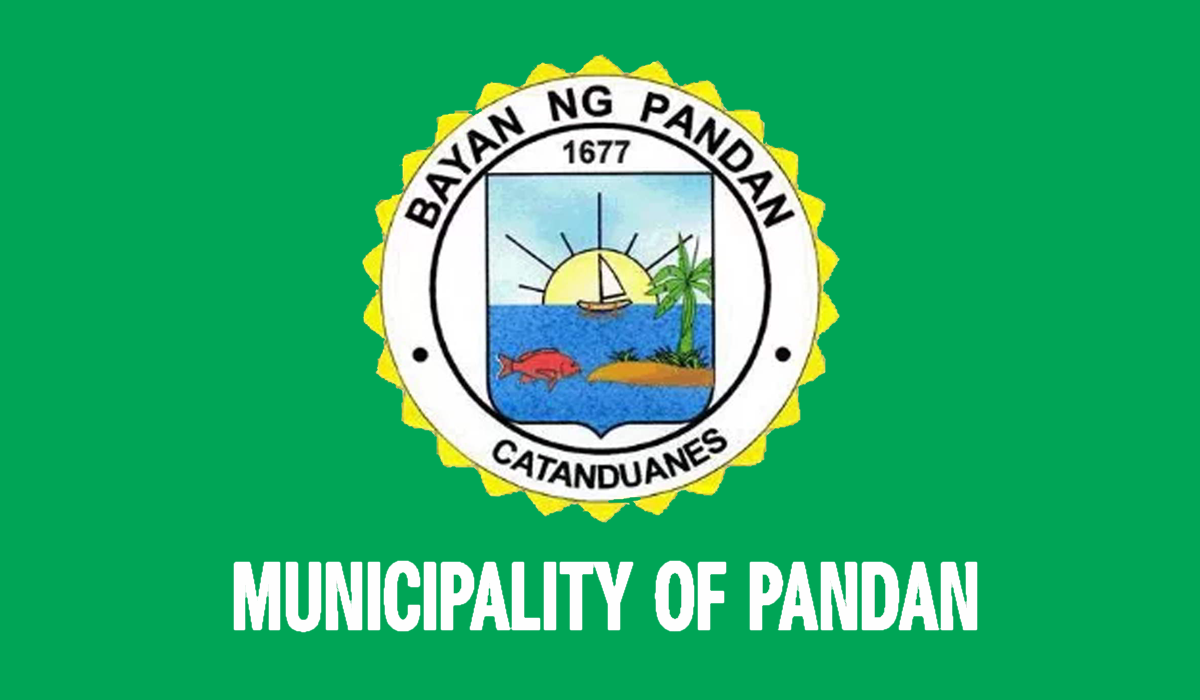
- Flag
- Nickname: Fishing Capital of Catanduanes
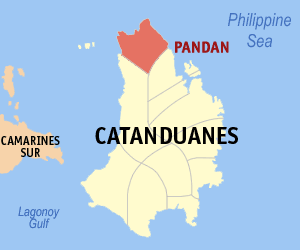
- Map of Catanduanes with Pandan highlighted
- Interactive map of Pandan
- Location within the Philippines
- Coordinates: 14°03′N 124°10′E
- Country: Philippines
- Region: Bicol Region
- Province: Catanduanes
- District: Lone district
- Founded: 1650
- Barangays: 26 (see Barangays)

Government
  - Type: Sangguniang Bayan
  - Mayor: Honesto C. Tabligan II
  - Vice Mayor: Eric T. Rodriguez
  - Representative: Eulogio R. Rodriguez
  - Municipal Council: Members: Erickson F. Niola; Mary Colyn F. Santelices; Janilyn I. Cantar; Agnes I. Gonzales; John O. Alcantara; John Willy D. Tabirara; Florestin C. Tabligan; Eustaquio D. Rodriguez
  - Electorate: 16,837 voters (2025)

Area
  - Total: 119.90 km^{2} (46.29 sq mi)
- Elevation: 63 m (207 ft)
- Highest elevation: 279 m (915 ft)
- Lowest elevation: −2 m (−6.6 ft)

Population (2024 census)
  - Total: 20,796
  - Density: 173.44/km^{2} (449.22/sq mi)
  - Households: 4,694

Economy
  - Income class: 4th municipal income class
  - Poverty incidence: 34.7% (2023)
  - Revenue: ₱ 149.1 million (2022)
  - Assets: ₱ 244.3 million (2022)
  - Expenditure: ₱ 109.4 million (2022)
  - Liabilities: ₱ 54.6 million (2022)

Service provider
  - Electricity: First Catanduanes Electric Cooperative (FICELCO)
- Time zone: UTC+8 (PST)
- ZIP code: 4809
- PSGC: 0502006000
- IDD : area code: +63 (0)52
- Native languages: Bicol
- Website: www.pandan-catanduanes.gov.ph

Pandan, officially the Municipality of Pandan, is a municipality in the province of Catanduanes, Philippines. According to the 2024 census, it has a population of 20,796 people.

== History ==
Formerly the town site was located some two kilometers away south of the present site. Then the people were disturbed by constant depredation of bandits coming from other places.

The present site has been chosen because it was near the sea and the fishermen found it very convenient for their trade, however, being near the sea, it was vulnerable to Moros who always come to get their belongings or even capture some people.

As a defense against such moro raids, the people planted pandan shrubs close to each other to form a formidable defense against invaders. When the Spaniards came, they found the plants around the poblacion in great abundance. When asked what the name of the shrubs was, the people told them that they were pandan shrubs. Thus, the Spaniards called the place Pandan.

=== Historical structures ===
The Pandan Church was built in 1874. the roof was completely razed by fire in a great conflagration of the town in 1920. This was repaired within five years during the incumbency of Father Jose Magno. The roof was again blown completely in 1940 by the strongest typhoon that has ever passed Catanduanes. It took many years to repair it; again, this was destroyed by typhoon Jean in 1947. Complete repair under the management of Father Orias was done near the end of 1953.

=== Old ruins ===
The only old ruin to be found in Pandan is the present Roman Catholic Cemetery. It was constructed during the Spanish era. Formerly, this cemetery was surrounded with concrete walls, which crumbled due to work of time and element. At present, very little portion of the walls remain.

The outstanding events that took place in Pandan during the Spanish regime may be divided into five different aspects, namely, social, political, religious, educational, health and sanitation.

=== Social and political ===
The system of governing the town was carried and through the so-called capitan or gobernadorcillo, which at present is called a municipal mayor. He was assisted in the administration of the town by the coadelieros, cabeza de barangay and aguacil who are now called policemen, councilor and barrio lieutenants or barrio captains now barangay captains respectively.

During those days land taxes were unknown. Once a person had paid his personal tax which amounted to P1.50, he was exempted from paying taxes of any kind.

Rape, robbery and killing were the greatest crimes during those days, and the penalty of offenders was death by hanging. Penalties for minor offenses like failure to clean one's surroundings consisted only of confining the guilty in the tribunal, now called the municipal building. Those found guilty were made to stand in a “pandog” all day long and given several beatings.

One thing unique about the Spanish Administration was the equality with which penalties were administered, because no matter what key positions in town one was holding, once he was guilty of any crime he was punished relentlessly.

=== Religious ===
On e commendable trend of the time was the people's strict adherence to their religious duties and practices. During Sundays at 7:00 o’clock in the evening a curfew bell in the Tribunal would be sounded, after which nobody was expected to be seen lingering around the town, otherwise, if anybody was caught by the cuadelieros (policemen), he was given a hundred lashes. During curfew hours everybody was expected to be in their respective houses singing such holy songs as the so-called “tarahadi”

=== Educational ===
There were very few teachers in the town, because teachers were still to be imported from the mainland. There was no such thing as principal, district supervisor, division superintendent because the administration of the school was solely the teacher's responsibility. During examination time the governor who was the over-all head of the province would just come over and gave oral examination to the pupils.

Severe and inhuman corporal punishment was the order of the day and woe to those who were rather slow in learning their daily lessons. Teaching consisted mostly of religious, a little of handwork and Spanish.

=== Health and sanitation ===
One accomplishment achieved along this line was the rigid enforcement of cleanliness of the immediate vicinity of the house. When one is found delinquent of his duty he is hog-tied and given a hundred lashes.

Whenever the governor of the province visited the town and discovered that some streets were not properly cared for, it was the capitan who suffered the penalty of being fined.

=== American occupation and World War II ===
The first American came to this town in the year 1900 under Captain Mane. The people did not offer resistance to the occupation of the Americans, so there was no fighting between the natives and the Americans. The natives were at first afraid of the American soldiers. They thought that the Americans might abuse them. When the natives observed the Americans began their policy of attraction by giving their foods to the natives. They offered cakes and candies to the children.

The Americans with the help of the prominent people organized the government. The municipal mayor or “capitan” as was called during those days was voted by the male inhabitants who were 21 years old or above. A male may be qualified to vote if he possessed any of the following (1) he must be 21 years old or above; (2) he could read and write; (3) and if he owned a piece of land. The first capitan who was elected was Capitan Eduardo Vera.

The Americans organized public schools. They selected big houses for school buildings. The first teachers were Americans. The most popular among them was Catler. The Americans gave pencils, paper and slates to the pupils in order to encourage the people to get to school. Even the adults were encouraged to go to school. The subjects taught were English, Language, Arithmetic, Reading and Writing. The Americans taught the natives healthful and sanitary living. They taught the people to clean their homes and surroundings and to make toilets. They established a provisional hospital wherein the soldiers and even natives were treated free by the American doctors.

The Americans stayed in the place for about a year. When they left the same system of government was instituted. The mayor or capitan was elected by the qualified voters.

The town was improved when Pedro Vera became the Representative of this province in 1928. Schools, roads and bridges were constructed. The Post Office, the Light House, and the present schools in this town today are some of the improvements done through the effort of Vera. The dike that prevents the destruction of the town was constructed through the effort of Rep. Pedro Vera.

In 1950 there was drought and the people suffered because there was no harvest of rice. In 1935 there was another typhoon, but it was not very strong. the second World War broke out in December 1941.

Pandan is the hometown of Former Senator Jose O. Vera, Rep. Pedro Vera, Former Governor Jorge V. Almojuela, Cardinal Jose T. Sanchez, Former Ambassador and Immigration Commissioner Leandro I. Verceles (the first Bicolano career diplomat), Former Congressman and Governor Leandro B. Verceles, Jr., Former Vice Governor Teofisto I. Verceles and Former Governor Araceli B. Wong. The present mayor is Raul Eubra Tabirar.

== Geography ==
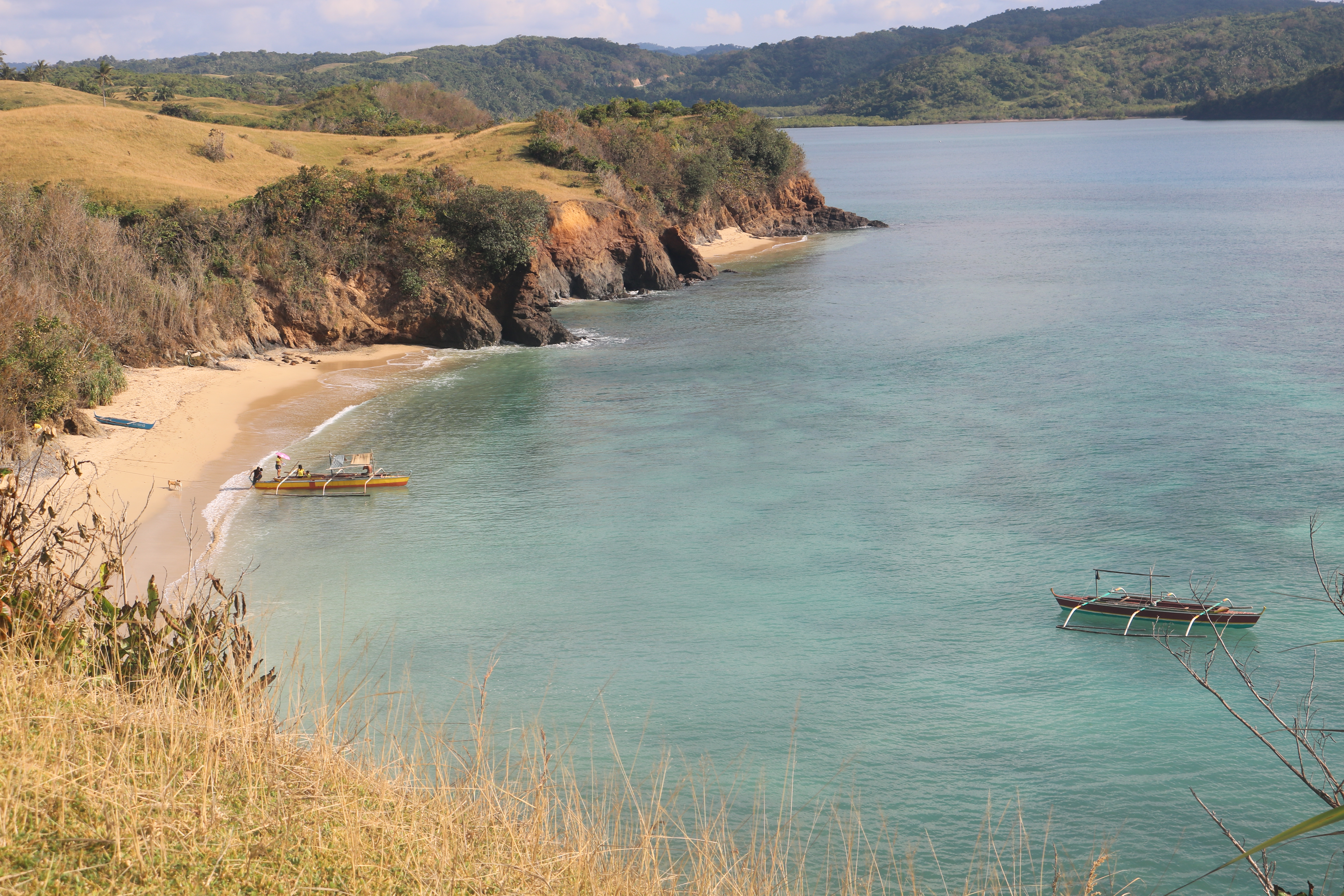
Cagnipa Rolling Hills

The municipality lies on the northern tip of the province, 107 kilometres (66 mi) from the capital town of Virac. Bounded on the south by the municipality of Caramoran, on the west by the Maqueda Channel, on the east by the municipality of Bagamanoc and on the north by the Pacific Ocean. It has a total land area of 11,990 hectares.

Of the 26 barangays that comprise the municipality, four of which actually form the town proper, which are Libod, the biggest barangay in terms of population, Napo, Pandan del Sur and Pandan del Norte. The rest are found usually near the seashore. The rest being inland barangays.

The municipality includes multiple natural sights, which some are the Parway, Mangbang, Parola beaches, the Hinik-Hinik falls (Hinik-hinik is a local term for rain shower) and Minaipit falls, but especially of its being a hometown of Senators, Congressman, Governor, Cardinal and Ambassador.

=== Barangays ===
Pandan is politically subdivided into 26 barangays. Each barangay consists of puroks and some have sitios.

- Bagawang
- Balagñonan
- Baldoc
- Canlubi
- Catamban
- Cobo
- Hiyop
- Libod (Poblacion)
- Lourdes
- Lumabao
- Marambong
- Napo (Poblacion)
- Oga
- Pandan del Norte (Poblacion)
- Pandan del Sur (Poblacion)
- Panuto
- Porot (San Jose)
- Salvacion (Tariwara)
- San Andres (Dinungsuran)
- San Isidro (Langob)
- San Rafael (Bogtong)
- San Roque
- Santa Cruz (Catagbacan)
- Tabugoc
- Tokio
- Wagdas

=== Climate ===
Climate data for Pandan, Catanduanes
Month	Jan	Feb	Mar	Apr	May	Jun	Jul	Aug	Sep	Oct	Nov	Dec	Year
Mean daily maximum °C (°F)	27 (81)	27 (81)	28 (82)	30 (86)	31 (88)	30 (86)	29 (84)	29 (84)	29 (84)	29 (84)	28 (82)	27 (81)	29 (84)
Mean daily minimum °C (°F)	22 (72)	22 (72)	23 (73)	24 (75)	25 (77)	25 (77)	25 (77)	25 (77)	25 (77)	24 (75)	24 (75)	23 (73)	24 (75)
Average precipitation mm (inches)	138 (5.4)	83 (3.3)	74 (2.9)	50 (2.0)	108 (4.3)	165 (6.5)	202 (8.0)	165 (6.5)	190 (7.5)	186 (7.3)	188 (7.4)	183 (7.2)	1,732 (68.3)
Average rainy days	16.8	11.9	13.5	13.8	20.5	25.2	27.4	26.2	26.1	24.7	20.7	18.5	245.3
Source: Meteoblue

== Demographics ==
Population census of Pandan
Year	Pop.	±% p.a.
1903	3,281	—
1918	8,408	+6.47%
1939	15,460	+2.94%
1948	10,253	−4.46%
1960	12,764	+1.84%
1970	14,612	+1.36%
1975	14,862	+0.34%
1980	15,156	+0.39%
1990	15,784	+0.41%
1995	15,725	−0.07%
2000	17,696	+2.56%
2007	19,005	+0.99%
2010	19,393	+0.74%
2015	20,516	+1.08%
2020	21,473	+0.96%
2024	20,796	−0.77%
Source: Philippine Statistics Authority

In the 2024 census, the population of Pandan was 20,796 people, with a density of 170 inhabitants per square kilometre or 440 inhabitants per square mile.

== Culture ==
The people of Pandan are described as generally peaceful, religious, and hospitable. Residents traditionally treat one another as extended family, freely sharing food and other produce without expectation of repayment. Visitors are commonly offered the best available accommodations, with hosts sometimes sleeping on the floor or on a papag (a simple bamboo or wooden bed) so that guests may rest more comfortably. Guests are often given local produce and live chickens to take home.

During celebrations, immediate neighbors are invited bringing among the whole members of the family and this seemed to be incomplete without tuba drinking and little dancing. Pantomina is a long-cherished dance that never changes with time despite the current dance and music. Pandananons has a series of collected pantomina songs which are now famous composed locally, of course it is not only the above songs, Pandananons used to compose, for evidence of which that gained popularity was a song composed by Alfredo dela Rosa, former Municipal Secretary of the Sangguniang Bayan of Pandan, entitled “Islang Catandungan”. This song won first place in the regional contest in Sorsogon sometime on the late 1960s.

== Economy ==
Poverty incidence of Pandan (%)

Source: Philippine Statistics Authority

== Education ==
There are two schools district offices which govern all educational institutions within the municipality. They oversee the management and operations of all private and public, from primary to secondary schools. These are the:

- Pandan East Schools District
- Pandan West Schools District

Municipality of Pandan had a quite high literacy rate and it is improving through the years. Each barangays had their own elementary schools.

=== Primary and elementary schools ===
- Bagawang Elementary School
- Baldoc Elementary School
- Balogñonan Elementary School
- Canlubi Elementary School
- Catamban Elementary School
- Cobo Integrated School
- Hiyop Elementary School
- Jose O. Vera Elementary School
- Lourdes Elementary School
- Lumabao Elementary School
- Marambong Elementary School
- Oga Elementary School
- Pandan Central Elementary School *
- Panuto Elementary School
- Porot Elementary School
- San Andres Elementary School
- San Isidro Elementary School
- San Rafael Elementary School
- Santa Cruz Elementary School
- Tabugoc Elementary School
- Tariwara Elementary School

=== Secondary schools ===
- Cobo Integrated School
- Leandro I. Verceles National High School
- Pandan School of Arts and Trades

=== Higer educational institution ===
- Catanduanes Colleges

== Notable ==
- José O. Vera, filipino politician, judge and film studio executive.
