= Baras, Catanduanes =

Municipality in Catanduanes, Philippines

Baras
- Municipality
- Municipality of Baras
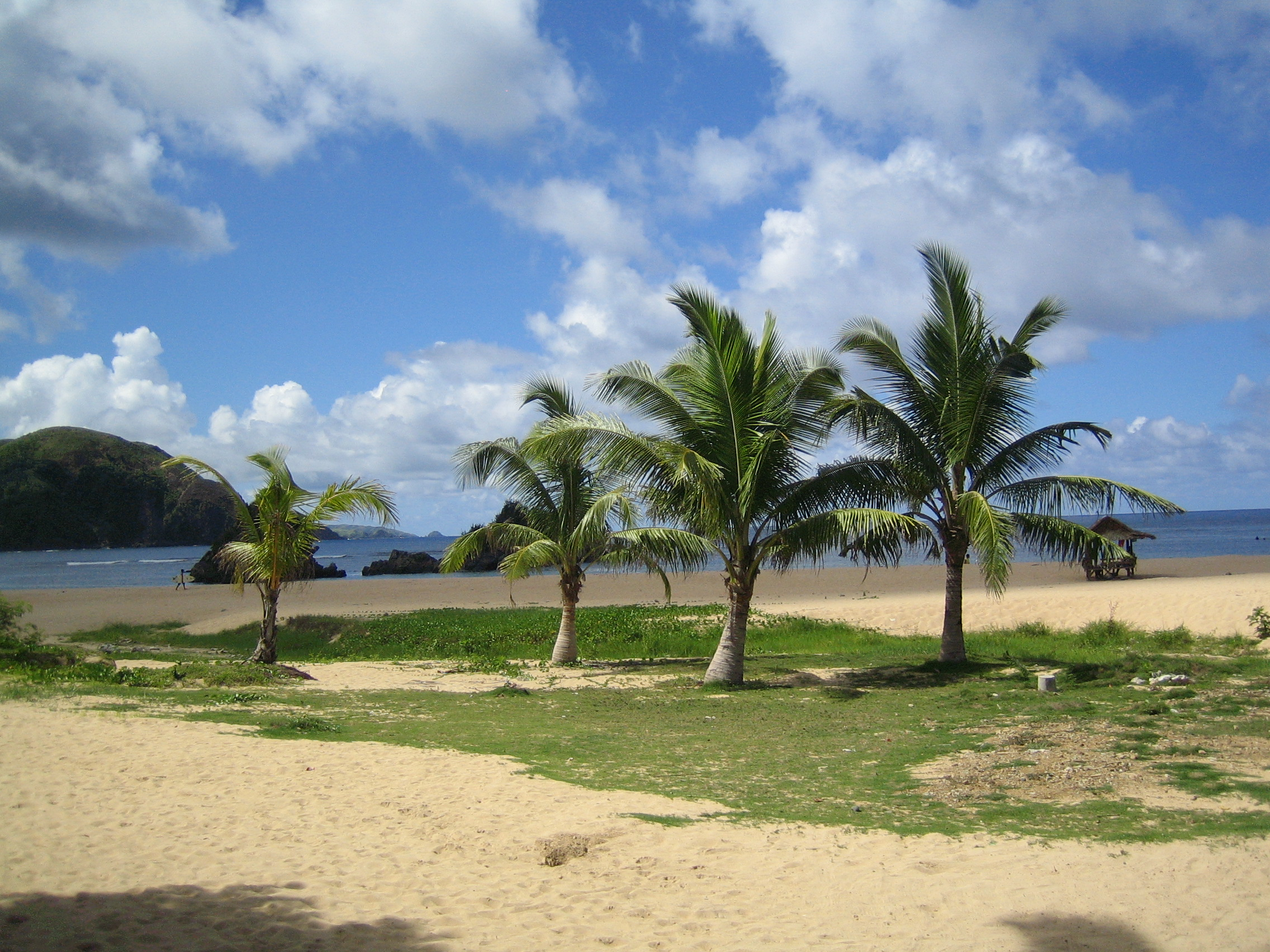
- Puraran beach

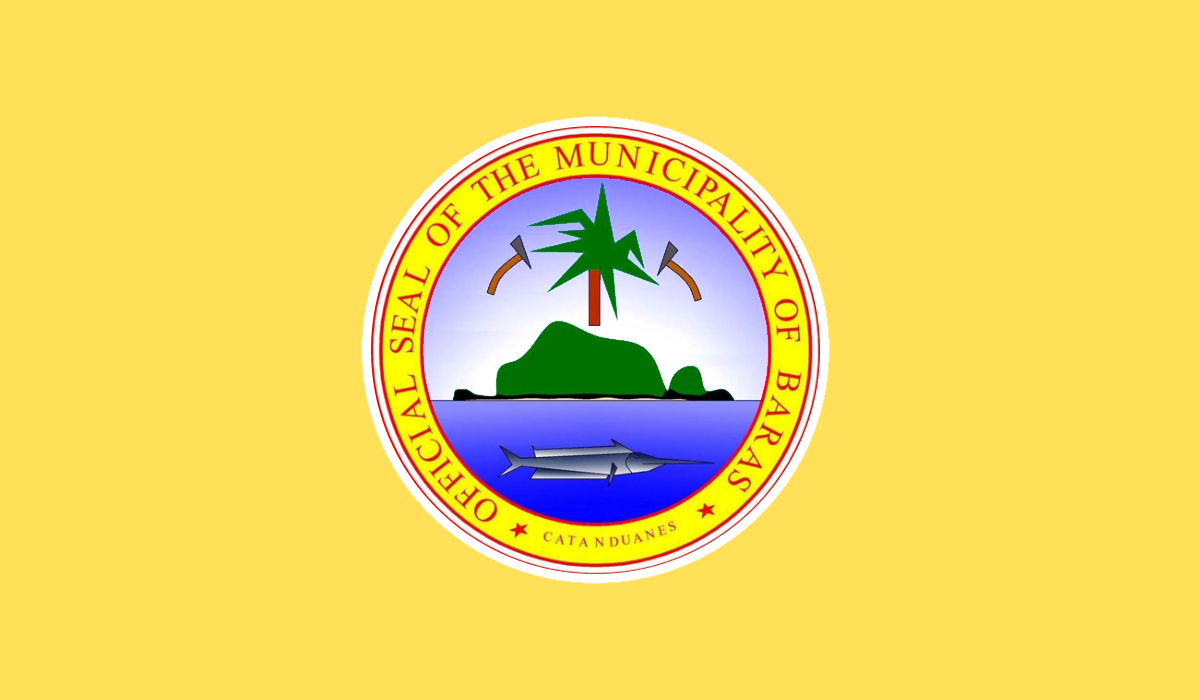
- Flag
- Interactive map of Baras
- Location within the Philippines
- Coordinates: 13°40′N 124°22′E
- Country: Philippines
- Region: Bicol Region
- Province: Catanduanes
- District: Lone district
- Founded: May 11, 1897
- Barangays: 29 (see Barangays)

Government
  - Type: Sangguniang Bayan
  - Mayor: Jose Paolo P. Teves III
  - Vice Mayor: Rico T. Tating
  - Representative: Eulogio R. Rodriguez
  - Municipal Council: Members: Perfecto M. Guerrero Jr.; Jose T. Tayoto; Emerson B. Oliman; Jesus B. Balunsay Jr.; Salve S. Bataanon; Juan V. Timuat Jr.; Edna S. Tomagan; Fidelito T. Soledad
  - Electorate: 10,934 voters (2025)

Area
  - Total: 109.50 km^{2} (42.28 sq mi)
- Elevation: 88 m (289 ft)
- Highest elevation: 561 m (1,841 ft)
- Lowest elevation: 0 m (0 ft)

Population (2024 census)
  - Total: 12,992
  - Density: 118.65/km^{2} (307.30/sq mi)
  - Households: 3,193

Economy
  - Income class: 4th municipal income class
  - Poverty incidence: 29.01% (2023)
  - Revenue: ₱ 114.7 million (2024)
  - Assets: ₱ 275.1 million (2024)
  - Expenditure: ₱ 55.12 million (2024)
  - Liabilities: ₱ 19.36 million (2024)

Service provider
  - Electricity: First Catanduanes Electric Cooperative (FICELCO)
- Time zone: UTC+8 (PST)
- ZIP code: 4803
- PSGC: 0502002000
- IDD : area code: +63 (0)52
- Native languages: Bicol
- Website: www.baras-catanduanes.gov.ph

Baras, officially the Municipality of Baras, is a municipality in the province of Catanduanes, Philippines. According to the 2024 census, it has a population of 12,992 people.

== Etymology ==
The name is derived from the "badas" plant, once abundant in this location. Yet, what kind of vegetation "badas" is, is a subject of conjecture. Some believed that it was a kind of bamboo, now called "bagacay". Others believed it to be some sturdy tree, but the majority believed that it is a wild rattan plant abounding in the surrounding mountains. Nevertheless, one common belief is the fact that this "badas" was a source of materials for making spears, a weapon used by the natives to repel raiders and pirates.

It is also believed that "badas" was a much in-demand material for building the native huts. Because of its abundance in the area, villagers called the place "Cabadasan".

== History ==
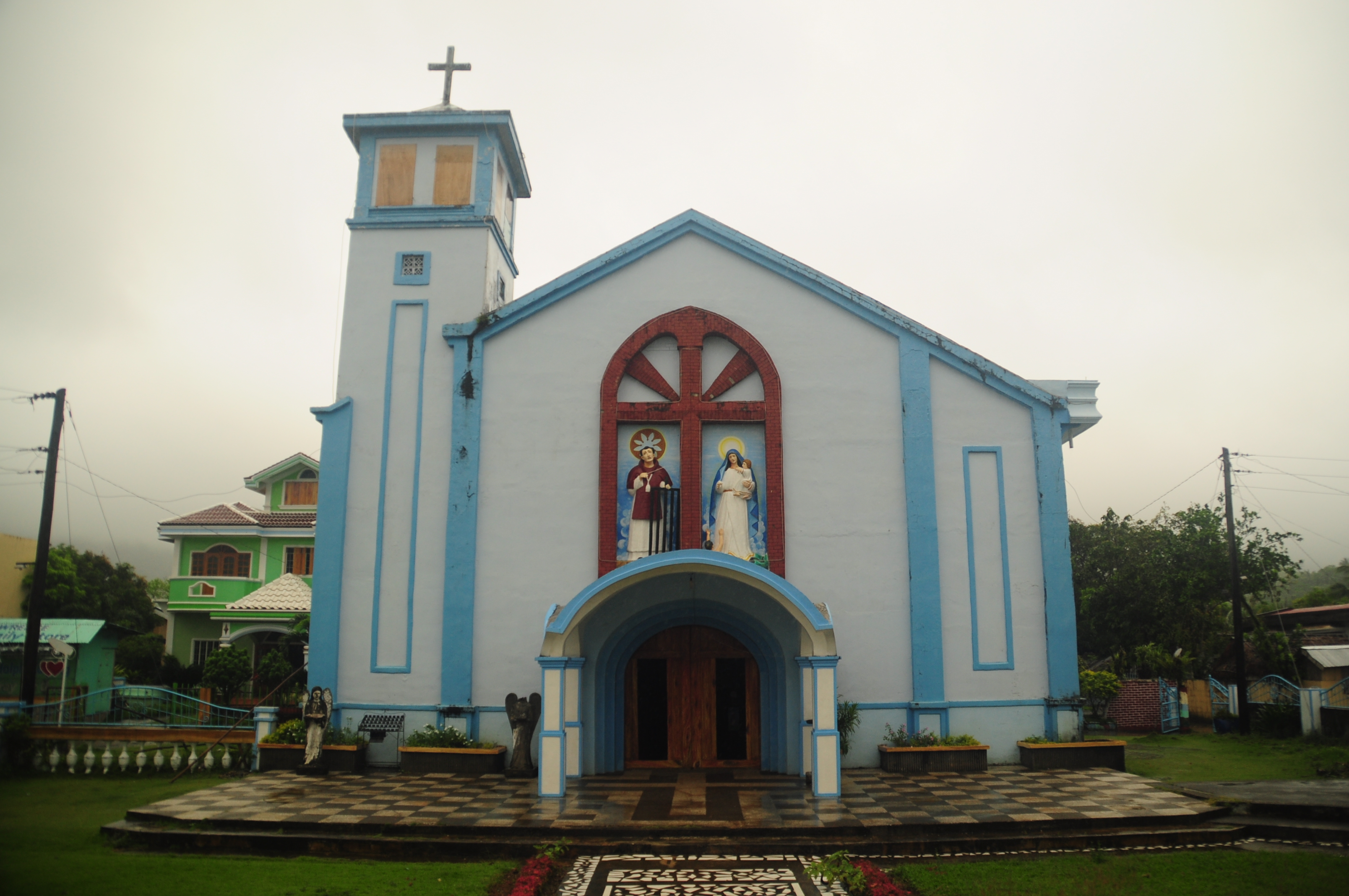
Baras Church, Catanduanes

Once called "BADAS" during the early Spanish Colonization of the archipelago. Some elders recall that Baras, centuries back were once a progressive fishing village located over a small mountain projecting towards the sea on the western side of Baras Bay. The poblacion was its cemetery and the cemetery now was its former poblacion site. The old site was chosen because it was an elevated area overlooking the sea.

The villagers could easily see approaching pirates that occasionally plundered the sea, giving them ample time to evacuate their families and prepare for the encounter. Several Skirmishes had been taught in the present poblacion.

Excavation in the Church Plaza reveals human remains of evaders. The pirates gone; the villagers later settled in what are now Baras. A splintered group of insurrecturs headed by a certain CATALINO CATAKUTAN who was facing the advantage of the insurrection taking place in the Southern Tagalog region, braved the rough seas to set a place in the long quest for Philippine Independence in the Island, forced by the gusty Southeast Monsoon wind they finally set anchor in the once rich fishing village called "Cabadasan" posing as fisherman.

By befriending the villagers and at the same time working on the growing discontent among the people against the tyrannical rule of Capitan CARLOS MACAPUGAY who was then Bat's town executive, the rebel grouped the men folk of the village to form a fierce fighting bond.

Out of this uprising led by Catalino Catakutan, the umbilical cord through which Cabadasan ruled was detached and the town of Baras was born.

Married to Maria Timola from Bato, Capitan Catalino Catakutan, with the burning desire for independence, did not live long to set office in the entire province. The Spaniards caught up with him while attending a wedding feast. Tortured and chained by the neck, he was paraded around the Poblacion of Bato to serve as warning to the people.

He was hanged near the church of Bato. In his stead, Capitan Mariano Teologo was installed as Bara's first town executive on May 11, 1897. Its original barrios were Tilod, Macutal, Paniquihan and Gigmoto.

=== Baras - A Town and then a Barrio ===
Baras was founded as a town on May 11, 1897, and Capitan Mariano Teologo served as its first town executive until the end of 1897. To minister to the town's spiritual needs was Pablo Zuniega, Baras' first parish priest, whose tenure ended in the middle of 1904.

The early year of Baras as a town was a period of difficult adjustment. In 1905, Capitan Quirico Arcilla, the town's fourth executive, started the construction of a semi-permanent municipal building called "TRIBUNAL". A dynamic and a dominant figure in Baras politics, his centering effort in the administration of local affairs as well as his proven integrity, he enabled the town to experience a period of prosperity. In 1906, Capitan Alvaro Vergara succeeded him. In 1907 due to financial difficulties the town was reverted to a barrio status. A few days later after its reversion into a barrio of Bato, its executive appointed Reymundo Tanael as Cabeza (barrio executive). Baras existed as a barrio up to the last days of 1909.

In a period of 3 years as a barrio, cabezas ruled it, namely: Cabeza Raymundo Tanael, Agustin Tanael, Felix Teologo, Lucas Arcilla and Catalino Guerrero. Before the end of the year 1909, civic, religious and business leaders of Baras demanded from the ruling governing power that it be re-created back into a municipality.

And, in 1910, Baras reverted into a town for the second time. Its first executive who was then called by the title of presidente municipal was Quirico Arcilla. Quirico Arcilla was succeeded by Alvaro Vergara in 1912. In 1914, appointed to steer the reign of government was Capitan Juan Pablo, a Tagalog immigrant who found a local belle for his life partner. In the election of 1915, he lost to Pedro Vergara, only to be elected again in 1918. From then, Baras moved on experiencing the test of time as a municipality. In 1927 Flaviano Camu, then constructed Camu Street connecting it to San Lorenzo Street. In 1929 the present sight of barrio Putsan was constructed.

In May 1933, the Bato-Baras Road was opened to traffic. In 1935 the gold boom reached Baras, an American firm headed by a certain Mr. Torchand dug sitio Banog in Agban and started the gold mines in Agban, at the same time the abaca and copra industries, for which Baras had been famous, were at their peak. For some unknown reasons the firm had to close shop at the end of 1938.

On 10 December 1941, or one year after typhoon "Oguis", a Japanese fleet, consisting of an aircraft carrier and a destroyer, landed at Batalay in Bato, swooped down on Barrio Guinsaanan in Baras, releasing three medium-sized bombs hitting Sayao rock off the coast of Guinsaanan, making Baras a ghost town overnight.

After a month with no governing officials reporting to their office, the incumbent Mayor Victor Tanael returned from hiding and normalcy returned once again. Other municipal officials reported to their offices. In the early part of 1943, Mayor Tanael died of sickness and so, the Japanese occupation government appointed Mr. Dionisio Tolledo as Mayor, Atty. Severiano de Leon as Municipal Judge, Mr. Pedro Teston as Chief of Police, Mr. Reynato Magistrado and Jaime Templonuevo as Policemen. They were the only officials appointed.

In the early morning of February 1944, the town folks were surprised by rain of bullets. Major Salvador Rodulfo aka "PHANTOM" of Barangay Tilod, Baras, fresh from his guerilla exploits in Albay, landed at Tilod with soldiers and started organizing independent guerilla outfit, later to be known as the Catanduanes Liberators Battalion. Baras became the sanctuary of the resistance movement in the province.

It was his group who was responsible for the annihilation of all Japanese soldiers in the island, killing most of them and capturing the remaining that were caught alive and raising to the ground their garrisons and hideouts.

Immediately after the liberation of the country from the Japanese warriors in 1945, President Osmeña appointed some Municipal Heads of the town.

In 1951, the barrios of San Vicente, Gigmoto, Biong and Dororian were transferred to then newly created town of Gigmoto.

Under the administration of Mayor Chito Chi, Baras town has just received a Certificate of Recognition for ranking number one in the collection of business taxes among the 5th income class municipalities in the entire Bicol Region that exceeded the target amount. Mayor Chito Chi was defeated by Rodel V. Abichuela, a lawyer by profession, in the elections of 2013.

== Geography ==
Baras is one of the eleven municipalities of the island province of Catanduanes. It is bordered on the north by Gigmoto, on the south by Bato, on the east by Kaladapan Bay and the Philippine Sea, and on the west by San Miguel. Baras is 24 kilometres (15 mi) from the capital town of Virac.

=== Slope ===
The surface landscape within Baras is made up of varying slopes. It is dominated however by slopes ranging 18-30% (Rolling to hilly) with land area of 38.0700 square kilometers or 49.830% and 30-50% (Steep Hills and Mountains) with land area of 29.6200 square kilometers or 38.770%. comprising the last slope surfaces are slopes 0-3% (level to very gently sloping) with land area of 7.2600 square kilometers or 9.500% and 50%-Above (very steep hills and mountains).

=== Land classification ===
Based on the land classification, the Municipality of Baras is divided into Alienable and Disposable lands and Forest lands. Alienable and Disposable Lands occupy land area of about 57.600 square kilometers or 75.390%. On the other hand, Forest Lands occupy only about 18.800 square kilometers or 24.610%

=== Soil classification ===
The municipality of Baras possesses varying soil types particularly Bantog Clay, Mountain soil, Atimodian Clay, and Luciana Clay. Most dominant soil types are Luciana Clay occupying about 56.1700 square kilometers or 73.590% and mountain soil occupying about 17.2800 square kilometers or 22.620%. The least soil types are Bantog Clay with land area of only about 2.1900 square kilometers or 2.860% and Atimodian Clay with land area of only about 0.7600 square kilometers or 0.930%.

=== Barangays ===
Baras is politically subdivided into 29 barangays. Each barangay consists of puroks and some have sitios.

Currently, there are 6 which considered urban barangays and 23 are rural barangays. Urban barangays have a total land area of only 1.0200 square kilometers or 1.332%, made up of Barangays Bagong Sirang, Buenavista, Eastern Poblacion, San Lorenzo, Quezon and Western Poblacion. On the other hand, rural barangays comprise the 96.668%, made up of Barangays Abihao, Agban, Batolinao, Benticayan, Caragumihan, Danao, Genitligan, Guinsaanan, J.M. Alberto, Macutal, Moning, Nagbarorong, Osmena, Paniquihan, P. Teston, Putsan, Sagrada, Rizal, Puraran, San Miguel, Salvacion, Santa Maria and Tilod.

Barangays with smaller land area are Barangays Bagong Sirang, Buenavista, Eastern Poblacion, San Lorenzo, Quezon, Western Poblacion and Santa Maria. On the contrary, barangays with the largest land areas are Agban, Benticayan, Genitligan, J.M. Alberto, San Miguel and Tilod.

- Abihao
- Agban
- Bagong Sirang
- Benticayan
- Buenavista
- Caragumihan
- Batolinao
- Danao
- Sagrada
- Genitligan
- Guinsaanan
- J. M. Alberto
- Macutal
- Moning
- Nagbarorong
- Osmeña
- P. Teston
- Paniquihan
- Eastern Poblacion
- Puraran
- Putsan
- Quezon
- Rizal
- Sagrada
- Salvacion
- San Lorenzo
- San Miguel
- Santa Maria
- Tilod
- Western Poblacion

=== Climate ===
Climate data for Baras
| Month | Jan | Feb | Mar | Apr | May | Jun | Jul | Aug | Sep | Oct | Nov | Dec | Year |
|---|---|---|---|---|---|---|---|---|---|---|---|---|---|
| Mean daily maximum °C (°F) | 29.3 (84.7) | 29.7 (85.5) | 30.5 (86.9) | 31.5 (88.7) | 32.2 (90.0) | 32.4 (90.3) | 32.2 (90.0) | 32.2 (90.0) | 32.1 (89.8) | 31.4 (88.5) | 30.7 (87.3) | 29.8 (85.6) | 31.2 (88.1) |
| Daily mean °C (°F) | 25.6 (78.1) | 25.8 (78.4) | 26.3 (79.3) | 27.3 (81.1) | 28.0 (82.4) | 28.2 (82.8) | 28.1 (82.6) | 28.1 (82.6) | 27.8 (82.0) | 27.3 (81.1) | 26.9 (80.4) | 26.3 (79.3) | 27.1 (80.8) |
| Mean daily minimum °C (°F) | 22.0 (71.6) | 21.9 (71.4) | 22.2 (72.0) | 23.1 (73.6) | 23.9 (75.0) | 24.1 (75.4) | 24.0 (75.2) | 24.1 (75.4) | 23.6 (74.5) | 23.2 (73.8) | 23.2 (73.8) | 22.9 (73.2) | 23.2 (73.7) |
| Average rainfall mm (inches) | 423 (16.7) | 356 (14.0) | 349 (13.7) | 146 (5.7) | 202 (8.0) | 224 (8.8) | 334 (13.1) | 212 (8.3) | 340 (13.4) | 708 (27.9) | 967 (38.1) | 738 (29.1) | 4,999 (196.8) |
Source: Climate-Data.org

Baras has a tropical rainforest climate (Af) with heavy to very heavy rainfall year-round and with extremely heavy rainfall from October to December. It is one of the wettest place in Philippines.

== Demographics ==
Population census of Baras
| Year | Pop. | ±% p.a. |
|---|---|---|
| 1903 | 2,777 | — |
| 1918 | 6,244 | +5.55% |
| 1939 | 10,328 | +2.43% |
| 1948 | 10,275 | −0.06% |
| 1960 | 9,637 | −0.53% |
| 1970 | 9,918 | +0.29% |
| 1975 | 10,338 | +0.84% |
| 1980 | 10,273 | −0.13% |
| 1990 | 9,769 | −0.50% |
| 1995 | 11,843 | +3.67% |
| 2000 | 11,653 | −0.35% |
| 2007 | 11,787 | +0.16% |
| 2010 | 12,243 | +1.39% |
| 2015 | 12,848 | +0.92% |
| 2020 | 13,484 | +1.02% |
| 2024 | 12,992 | −0.89% |
Source: Philippine Statistics Authority

In the 2024 census, the population of Baras was 12,992 people, with a density of 120 inhabitants per square kilometre or 310 inhabitants per square mile.

== Economy ==
Poverty incidence of Baras

Source: Philippine Statistics Authority

== Government ==
=== List of former chief executives ===
==== As a Town ====
Capitan Mariano Teologo ................... 1897-1898
Capitan Vicente Guerrero................... 1899-1900
Capitan Jose Patrocinio Rodulfo..........1901-1903
Capitan Quirico Arcilla .........................1904-1905
Capitan Alvaro Vergara ...................... 1906

==== As a Barrio (Reverted) ====
Cabeza Raymundo Tanael .................. January - July 1907
Cabeza Agustin Tanael ........................ August - December 1907
Cabeza Felix Teologo .......................... January - July 1908
Cabeza Lucas Arcilla ........................... August - December 1908
Cabeza Catalino Guerrero .................. January - December 1909

==== As a Town (Reverted as a Town) ====
Presidente Municipal Quirico Arcilla ........................... 1910-1911
Presidente Municipal Alvaro Vergara .......................... 1912-1913
Presidente Municipal Juan Pablo ................................ 1914-1915
Presidente Municipal Pedro Vergara ........................... 1916-1917
Presidente Municipal Juan Pablo ..................................1918-1919
Presidente Municipal Cristobal Guerrero ......................1920-1921
Presidente Municipal Pablo Tariman ............................ 1922-1923
Presidente Municipal Victoriano Tanael (Successor).....1923-1924
Presidente Municipal Martin Toledana ......................... 1924-1925
Presidente Municipal Antonio Tulay ............................. 1925-1926
Presidente Municipal Flaviano Camu ........................... 1926-1928
Presidente Municipal Roman Rodulfo .......................... 1928-1930
Presidente Municipal Martin Toledana .......................... 1930-1931
Presidente Municipal Honuario Dayawon ...................... 1931-1933
Presidente Municipal Pedro Beraquit ............................ 1934-1936
Municipal Mayor Ramon Templonuevo .......................... 1937-1941
Municipal Mayor Victor Tanael ....................................... 1941-1942
Municipal Mayor Dionisio Tolledo ................................... 1942-1944
Municipal Mayor Silvino Joson ....................................... 1945-1946
Municipal Mayor Placida Beraquit .................................. 1947-1948
Municipal Mayor Godofredo Tayam ................................ 1948-1951
Municipal Mayor Pedro Teston ....................................... 1952-1955
Municipal Mayor Alfredo Tanael ..................................... 1956-1959
Municipal Mayor Pedro Beraquit .................................... 1960-1963
Municipal Mayor Amador Teston .................................... 1964-1967
Municipal Mayor David Templonuevo(Successor)........... September–December, 1967
Municipal Mayor Temis Teves ......................................... 1968-1971
Municipal Mayor Serafin Sarmiento ................................ 1972-1986
Municipal Mayor Jesus Torrente (Officer-In-Charge)....... 1986-1987
Municipal Mayor Serafin Sarmiento ................................ 1988-1995
Municipal Mayor Jorge Tanael ........................................ 1995-1998
Municipal Mayor Serafin Sarmiento ................................ 1998-2001
Municipal Mayor Jose J. Teves, Jr. .................................. 2001-2010
Municipal Mayor Chito S. Chi .......................................... 2010-2013
Municipal Mayor Rodel V. Abichuela ..................................2013-2016
Municipal Mayor Chito S. Chi .......................................... 2016 – present

== Education ==
There are two schools district offices which govern all educational institutions within the municipality. They oversee the management and operations of all private and public, from primary to secondary schools. These are the:

- Baras North Schools District
- Baras South Schools District

=== Primary and elementary schools ===
- Abihao Elementary School
- Agban Central Elementary School
- Baras Central Elementary School
- Benticayan Elementary School
- Caragumihan Elementary School
- Genitligan Elementary School
- Guinsaanan Elementary School
- Macutal Elementary School
- Moning Elementary School
- Paniquihan Elementary School
- Puraran Elementary School
- Putsan-Danao Elementary School
- Salvacion Elementary School
- San Miguel Elementary School
- Sta. Maria Elementary School
- Tilod Elementary School

=== Secondary schools ===
- Agban National High School
- Baras Rural Development High School
