= Bananatex =

Biodegradable fabric made from Abacá banana plant fibres

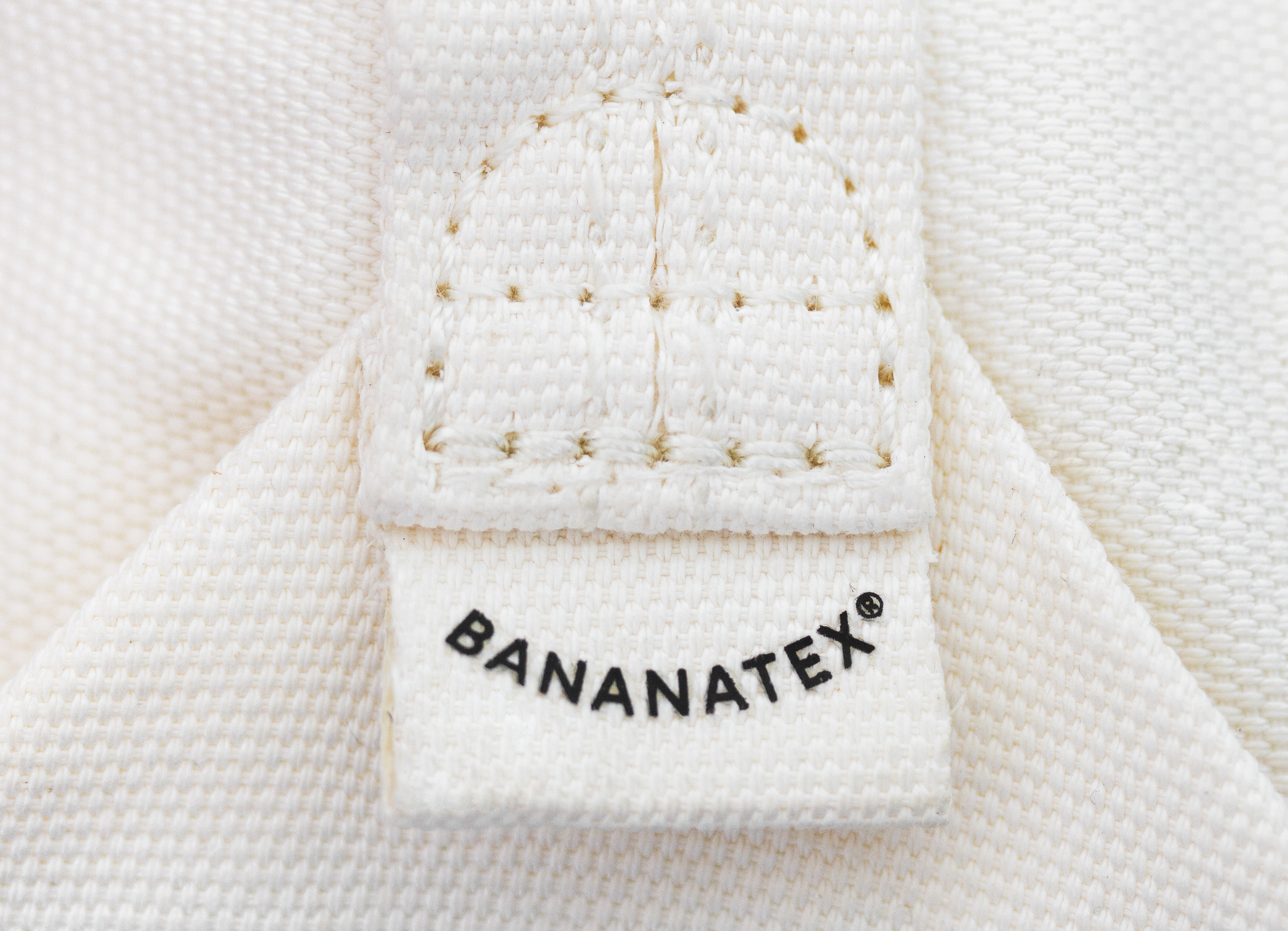
- Type: Fabric
- Inception: October 2018
- Manufacturer: QWSTION
- Available: Yes
- Current supplier: QWSTION
- Website: www.bananatex.info

Bananatex is a natural cellulosic biodegradable "technical" canvas fabric made of Abacá banana plant fibres (also known as Manila hemp). The plants are grown in the Philippines as part of a sustainable forestry project in Catanduanes. Bananatex was developed and is distributed by the Swiss canvas goods company QWSTION and is used in the company's own products as well as in other companies' manufactured goods. Bananatex was developed to have better wear characteristics than cotton while being more sustainable. It is less durable than synthetics like Cordura, and can biodegrade. Bananatex is sold in a range of colours and is available with or without a natural beeswax waterproof coating.

== Development ==
Bananatex was developed over three years by Zürich, Switzerland-based fashion company QWSTION, which was founded in 2008 to research renewable materials to replace synthetic textiles. The company was created to address environmental, economic and social sustainability issues of petroleum-based synthetic materials in the textile manufacturing industry. Bananatex was created in collaboration with a yarn spinning company in Tainan, Taiwan.

== Production process ==
Unlike cotton and some other natural fibres like cotton Abacá plants require no pesticides, herbicides or irrigation. This allows mixed-species, organic plantations in areas which were monoculture oil palm plantations, and in deforested rainforest cut down for lumber. Growing abacá plants can reduce erosion, increase biodiversity and enrich the soil. This is accomplished by interplanting abacá with other plant species and by allowing discarded abacá leaves to decompose and return their nutrients to the soil.

=== Cultivation ===
The Abacá plants are grown in Catanduanes in the Philippine highlands without the use of water or pesticides. The banana plant is harvested up to three times per year.

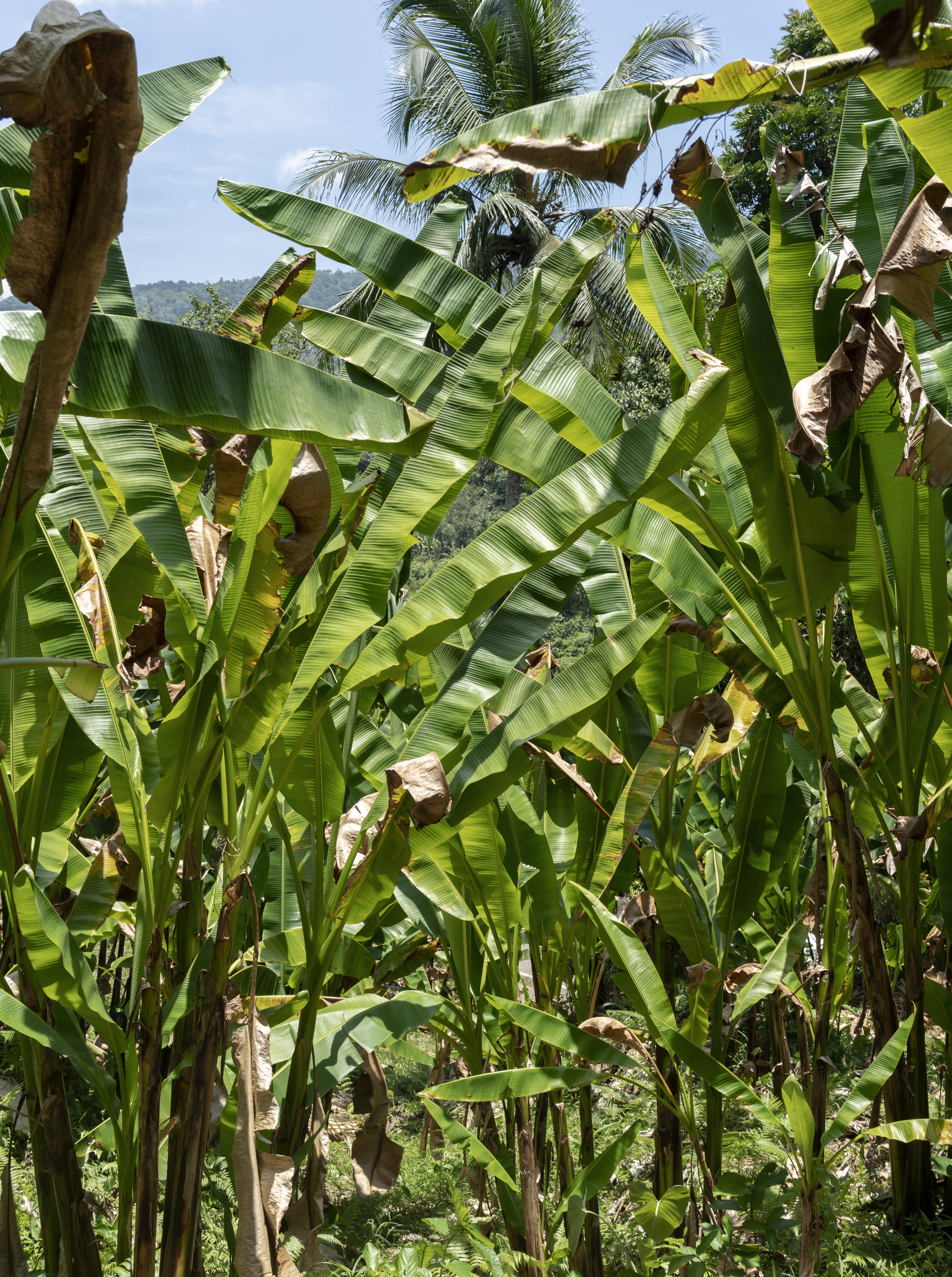
1. Abacá plants have several stalks which can be harvested annually and regenerate fully within a year.

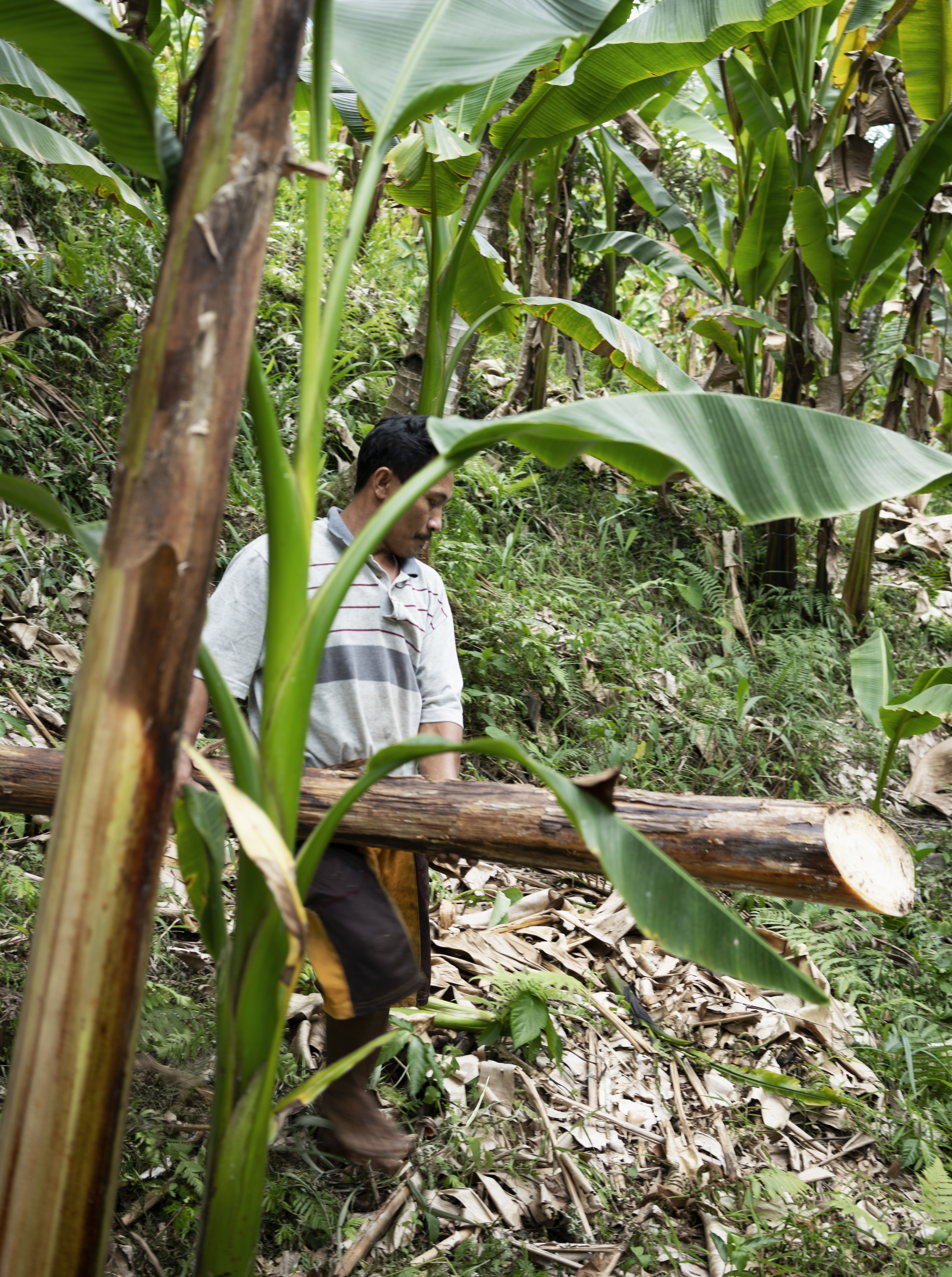
2. Abacá plants are harvested by “topping”, cutting the leaves with a bamboo sickle, cutting or “tumbling” the stalks. The leaves are compost on the ground, creating a fertiliser.

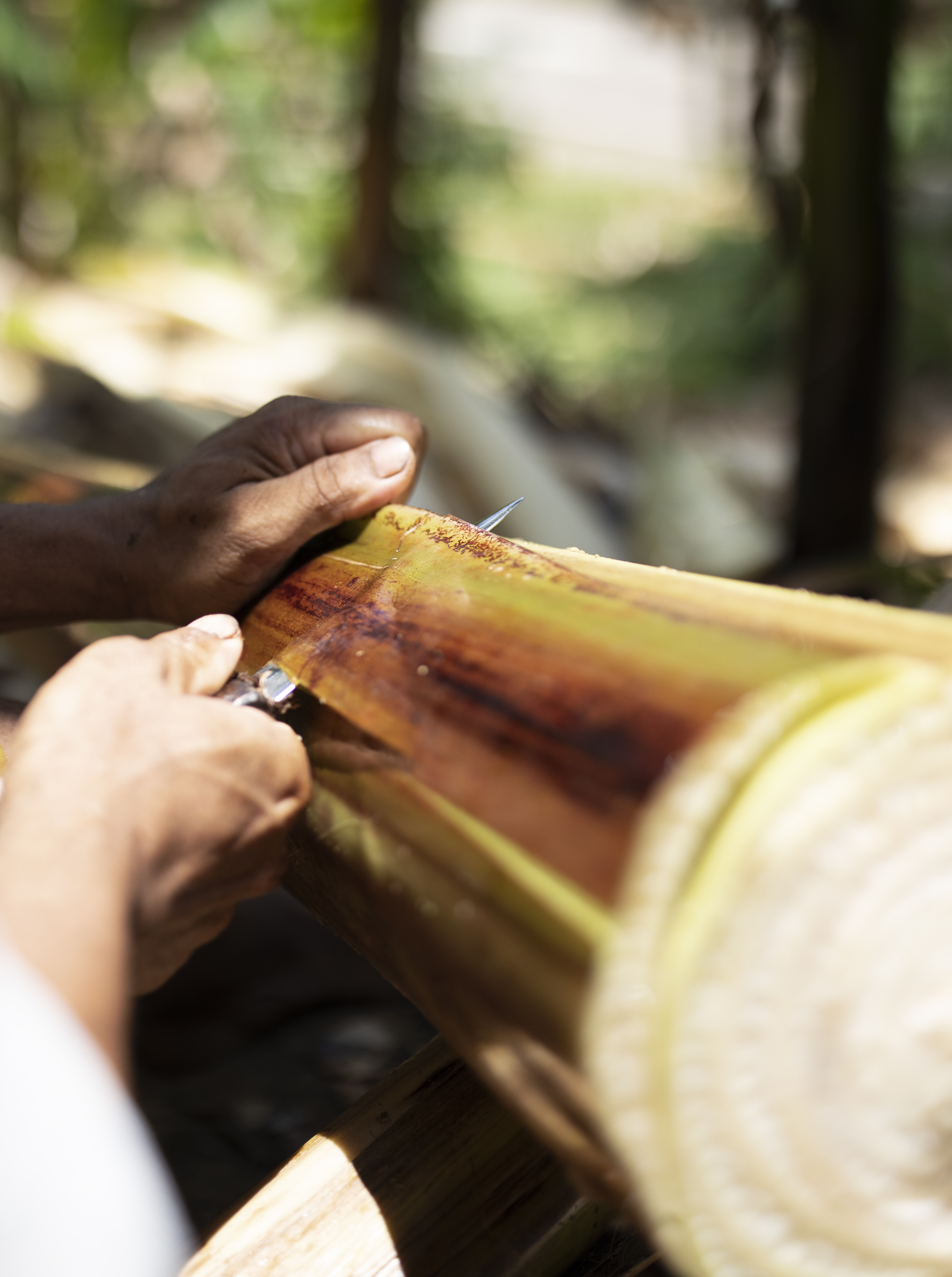
3. The tuxy, the outer layer of the leaf sheath contains primary fibres is separated from the inner layers.

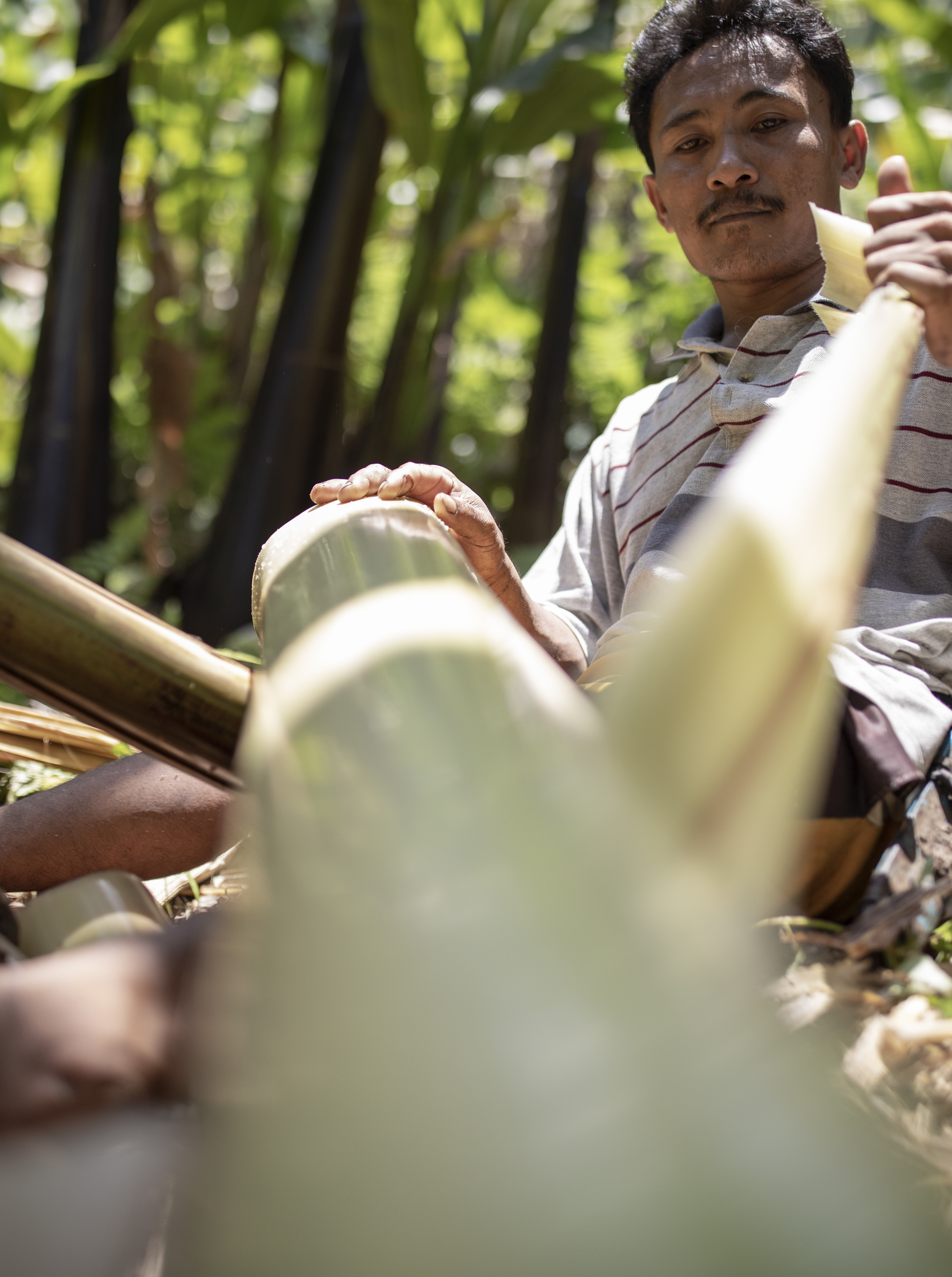
4. The inner layers contain the secondary fibres and pulpy material.

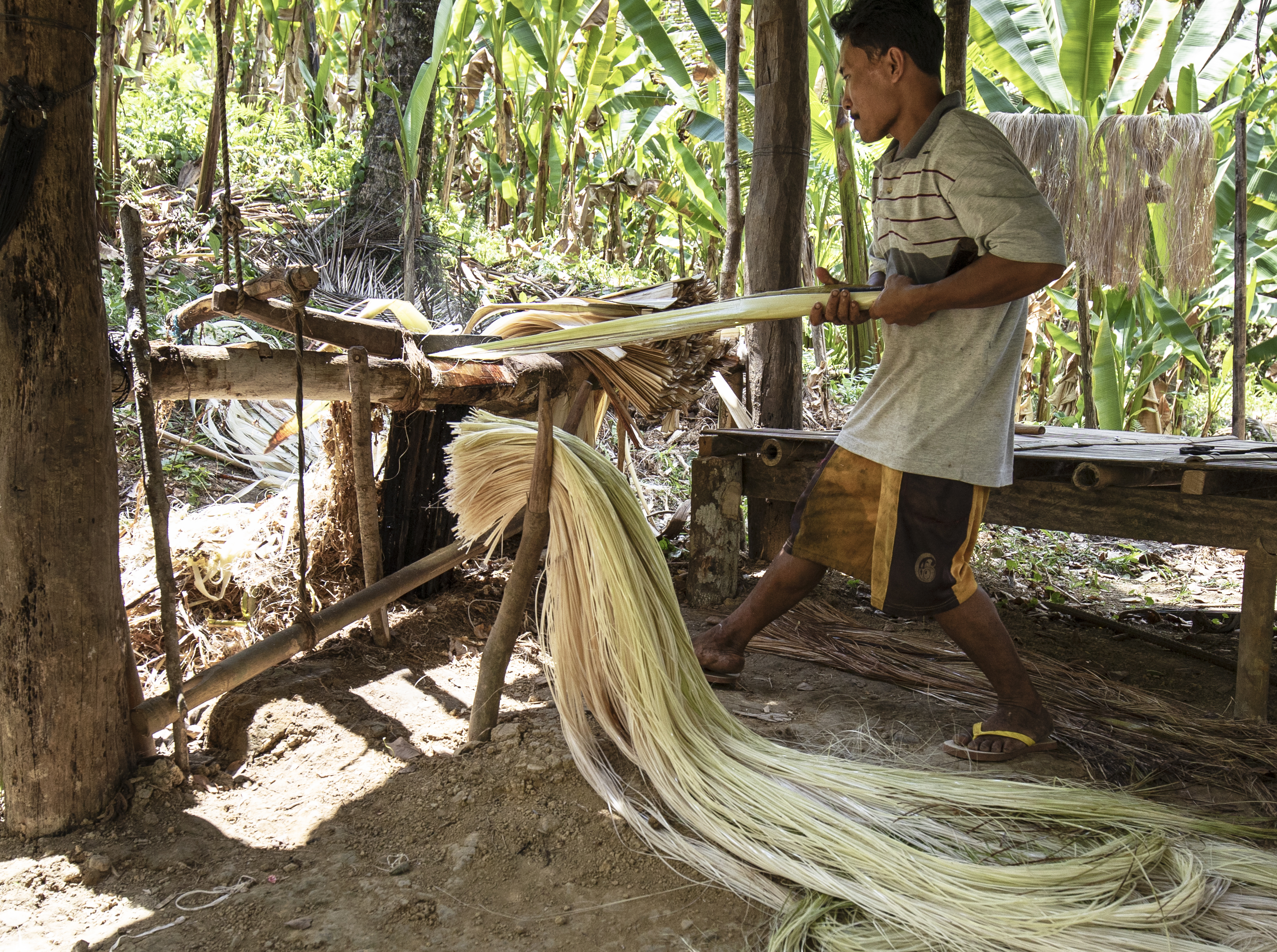
5.The tuxies are separated by hand using a stripping knife at the harvesting site.

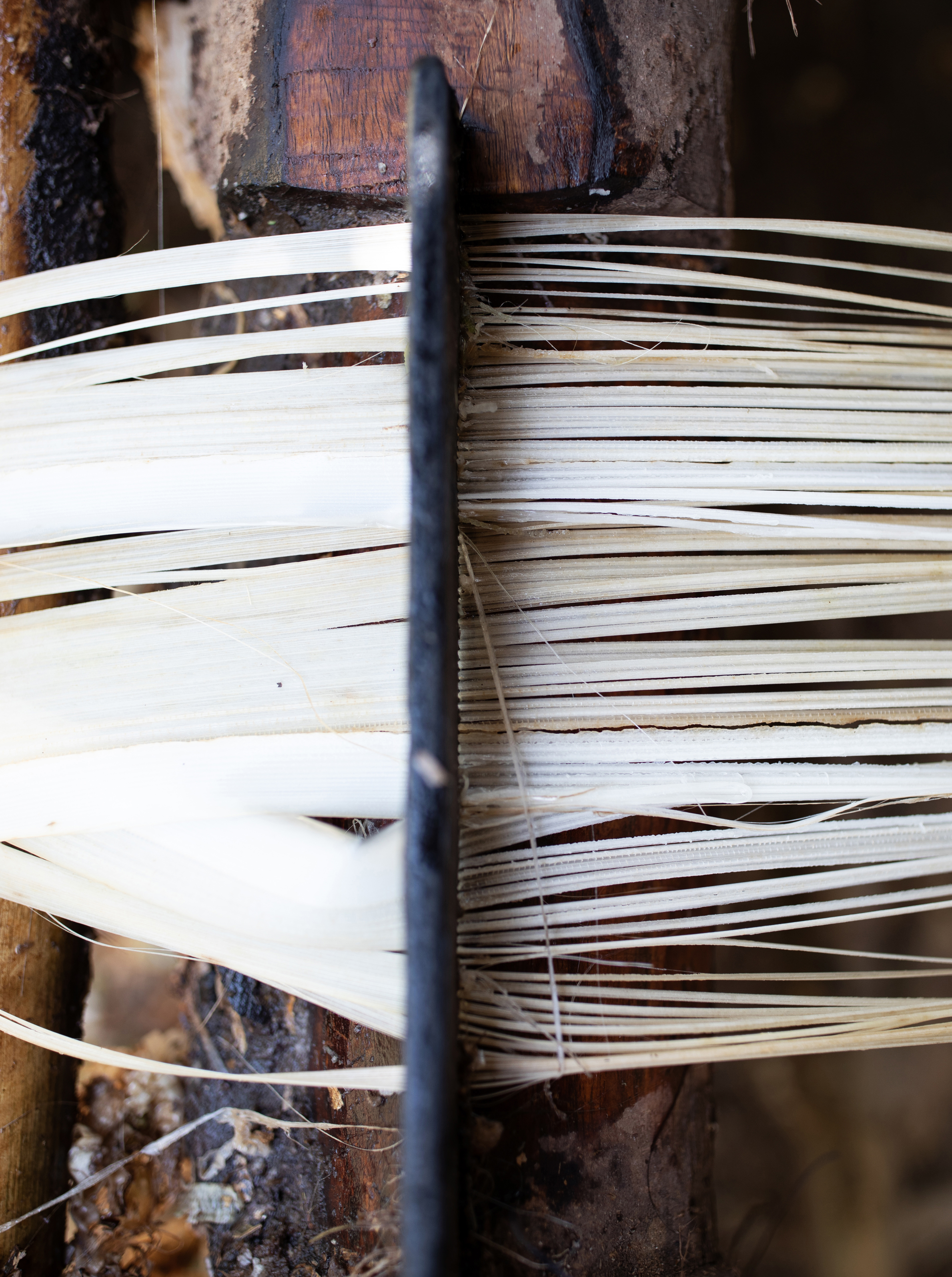
6. The fibres are then “combed” to separate them.

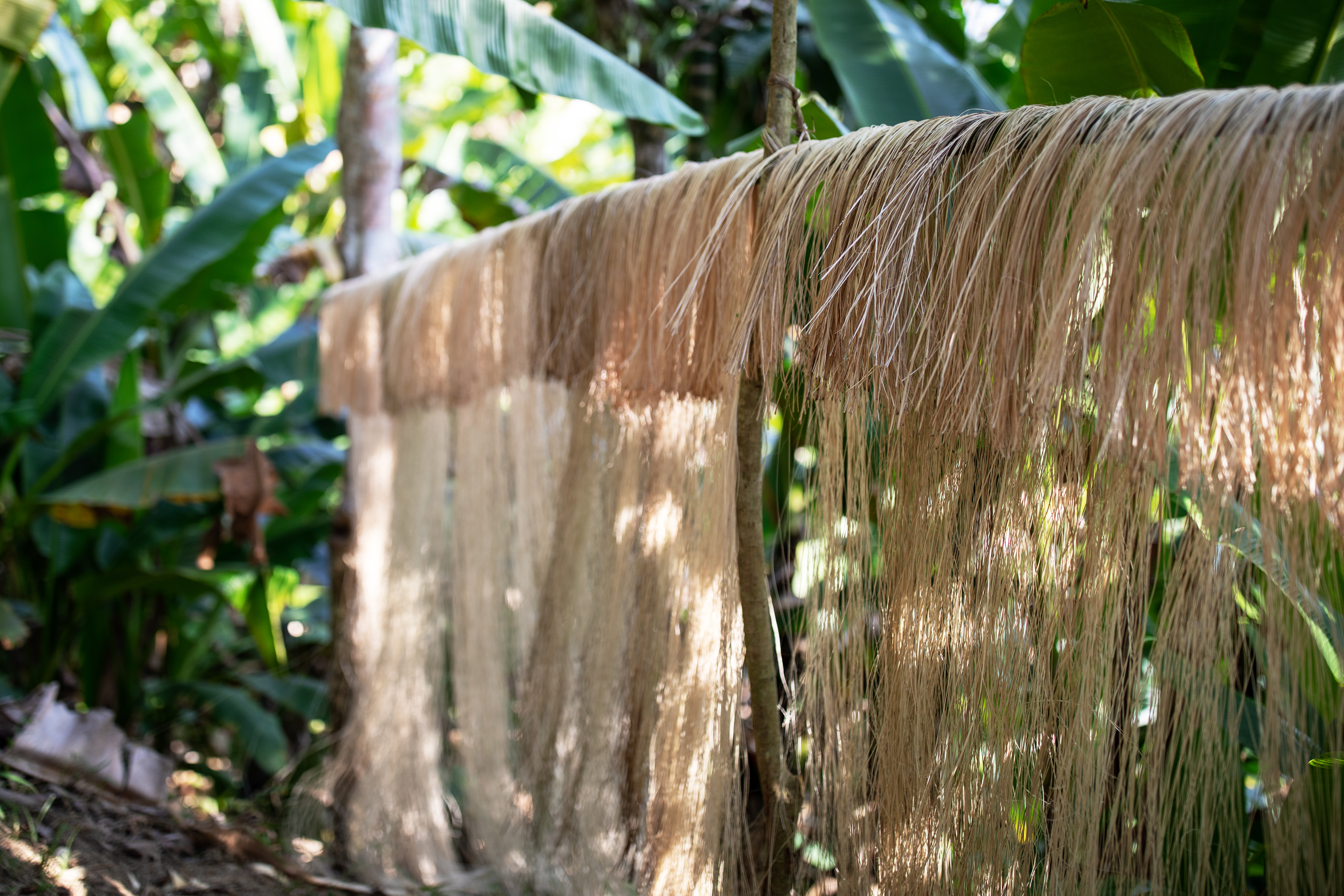
7. The fibres are then air-dried and bundled together before being transported from forest to the trading warehouse of the farmers cooperative.

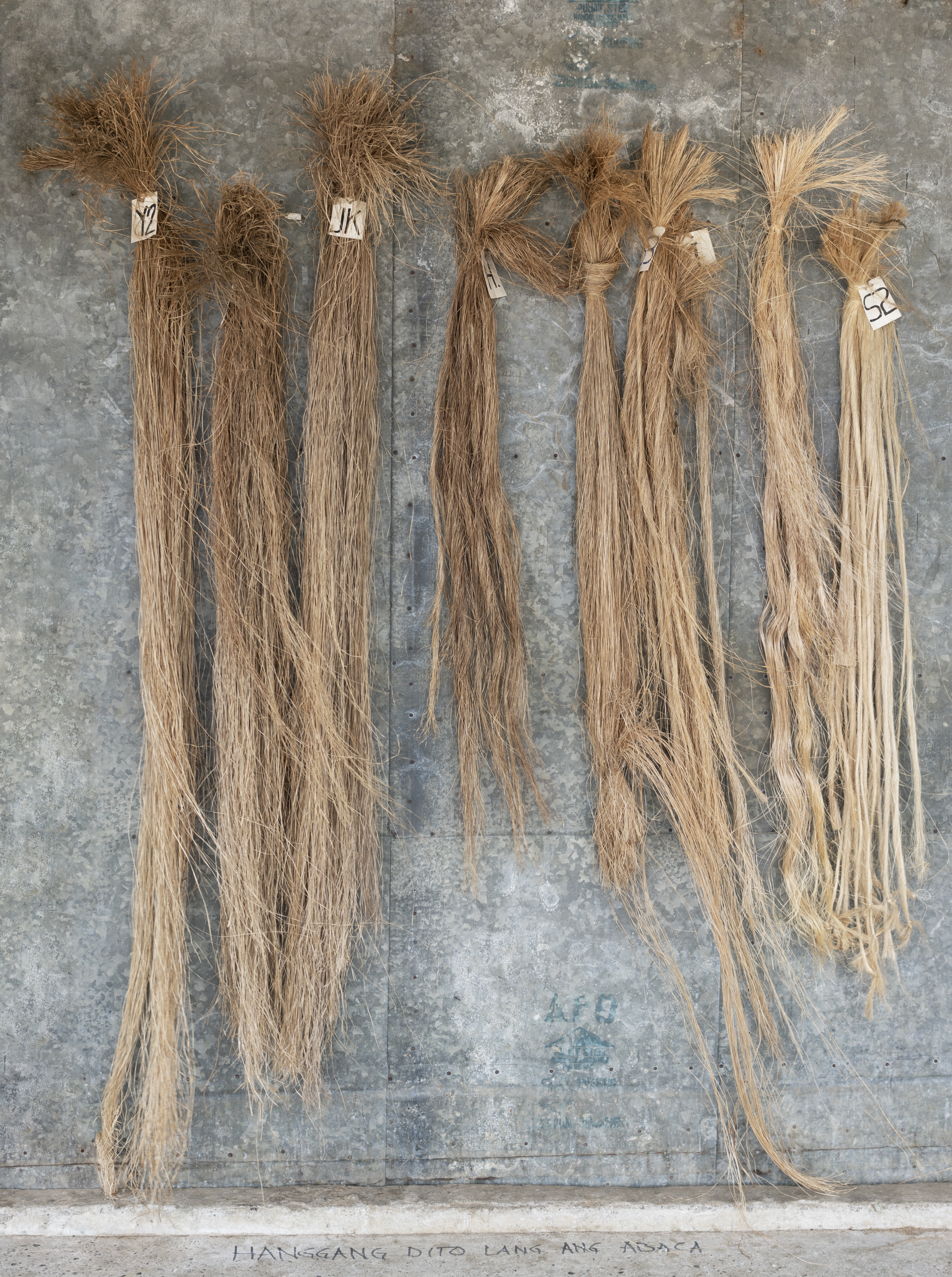
8. There they are sorted by colour grades, with lighter coloured fibres being more expensive due to their rarity.

=== Processing ===
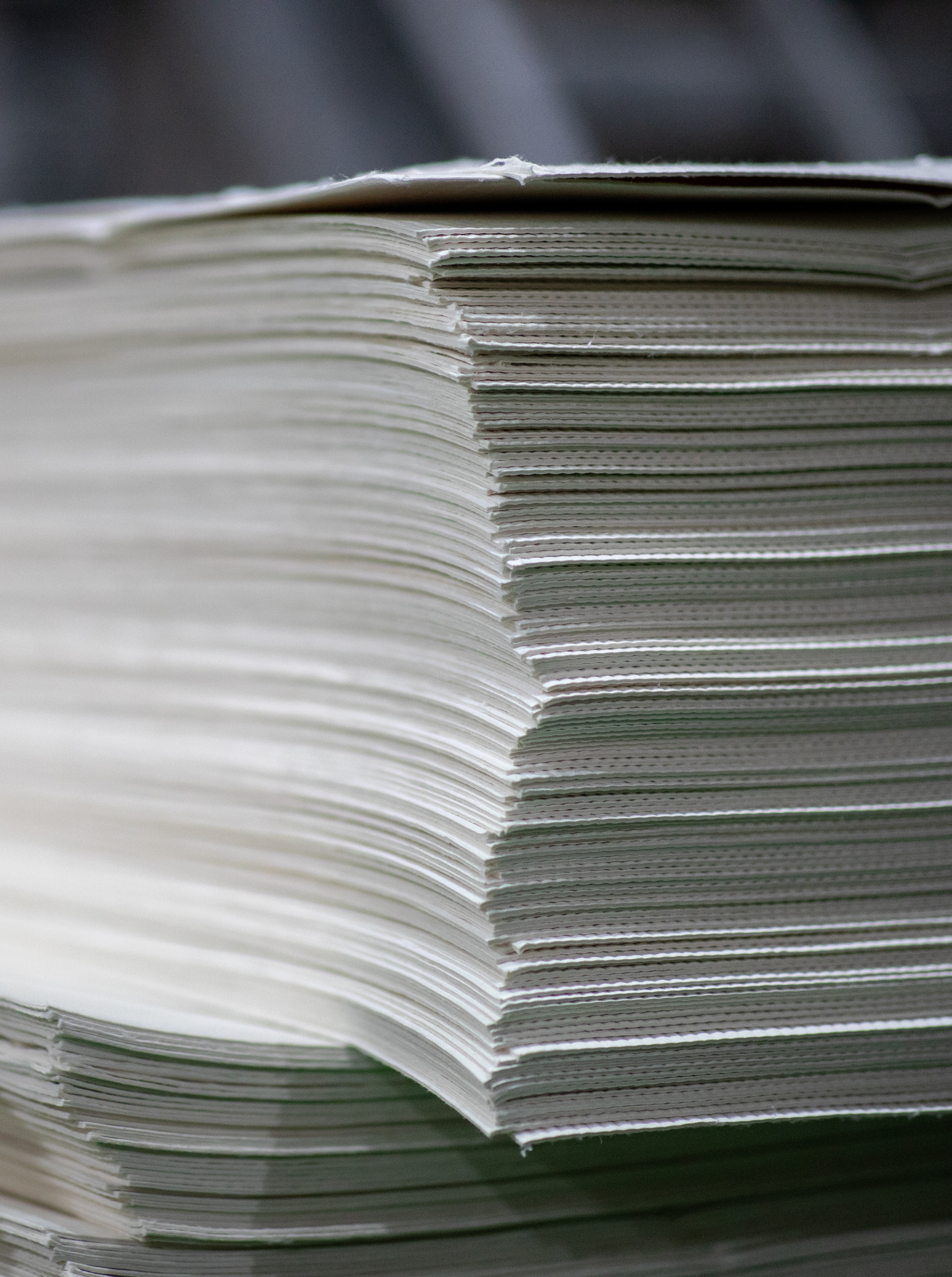
1. The raw fibres are tied with rope and shipped to Mindanao, Philippines, where they are boiled and pressed into cardboard like sheets which are then shipped to Taiwan.

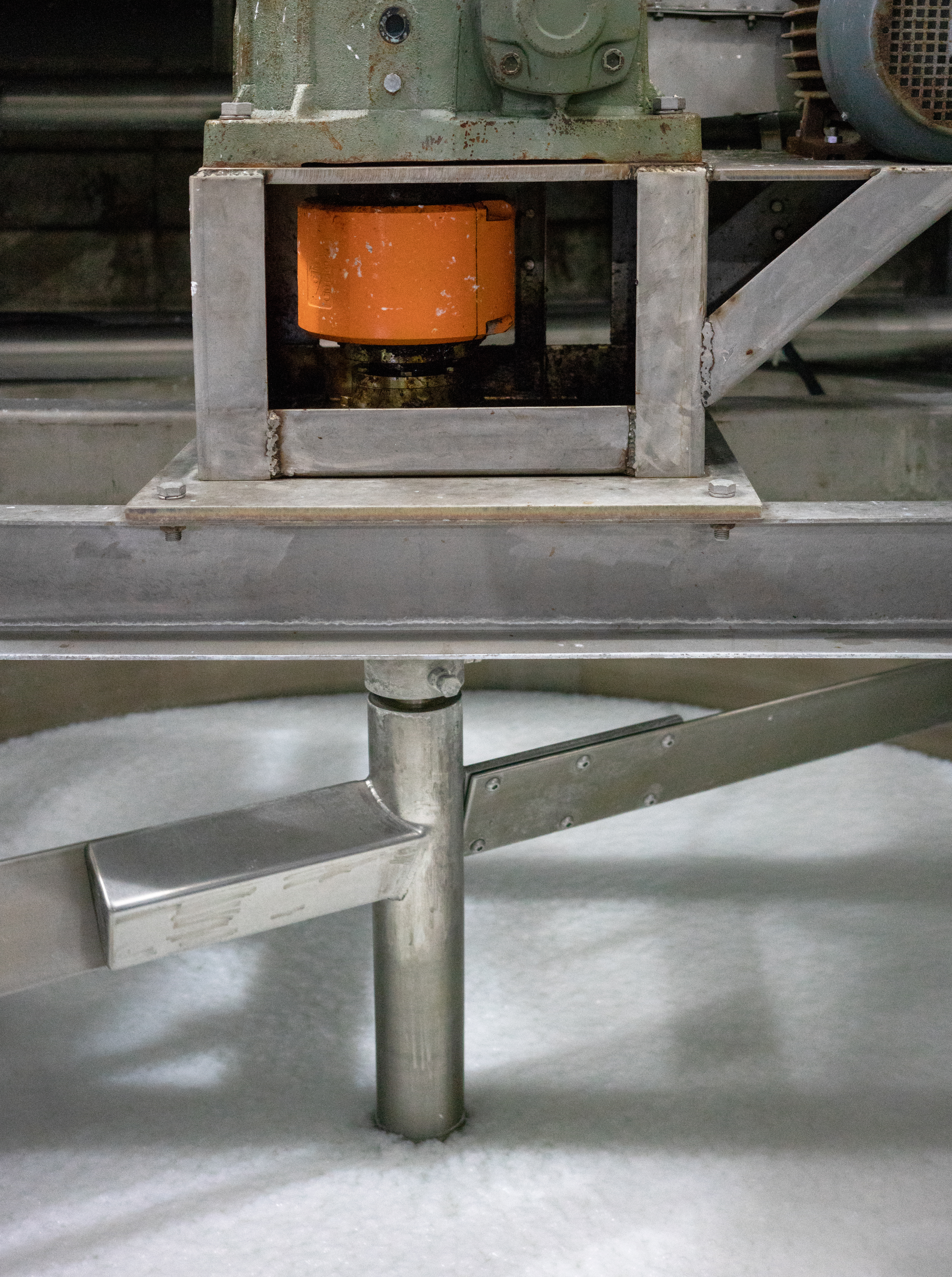
2. The abacá fibre sheets are then soaked in water.

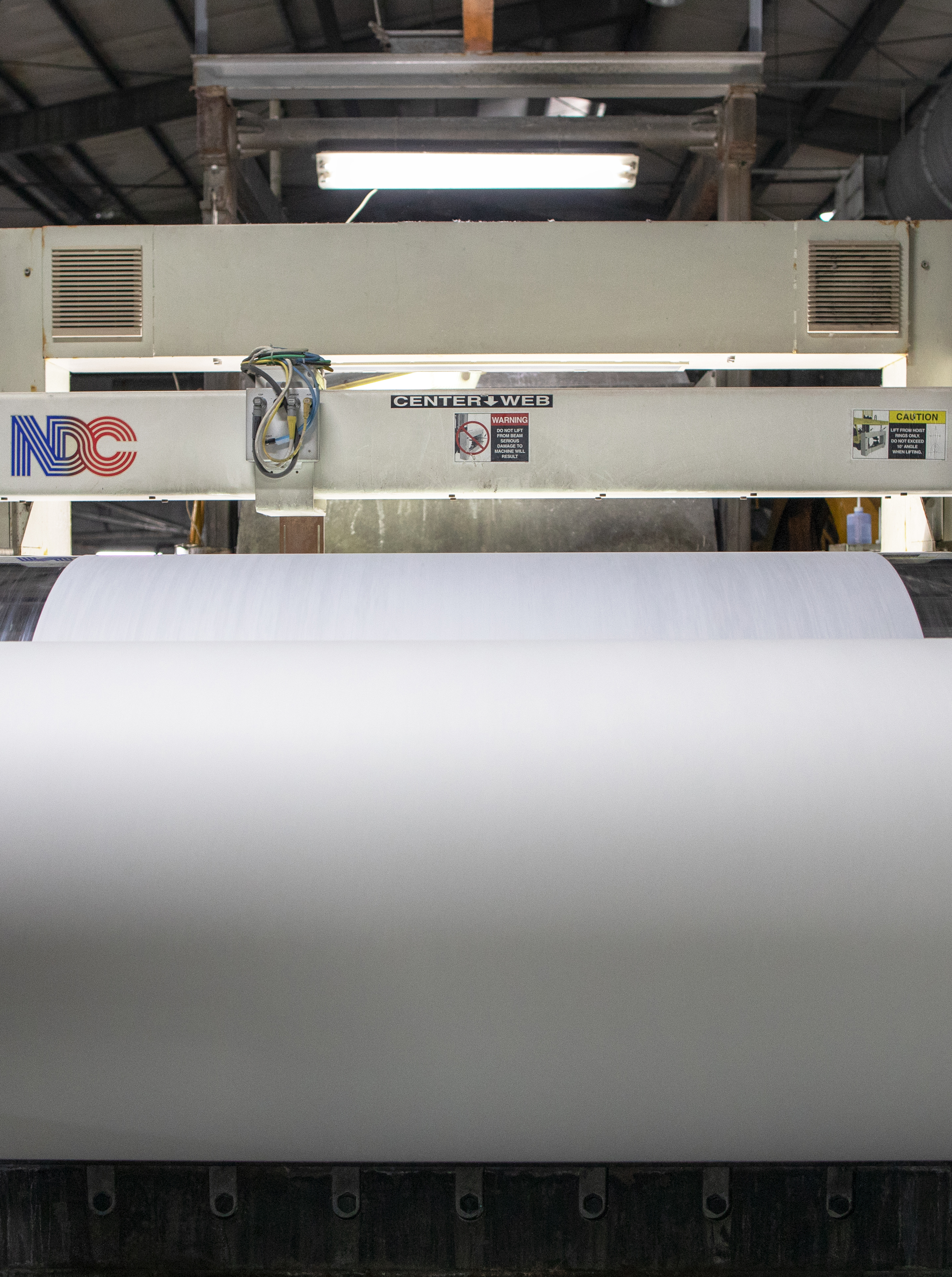
3. They are then made into paper which are then cut into strips.

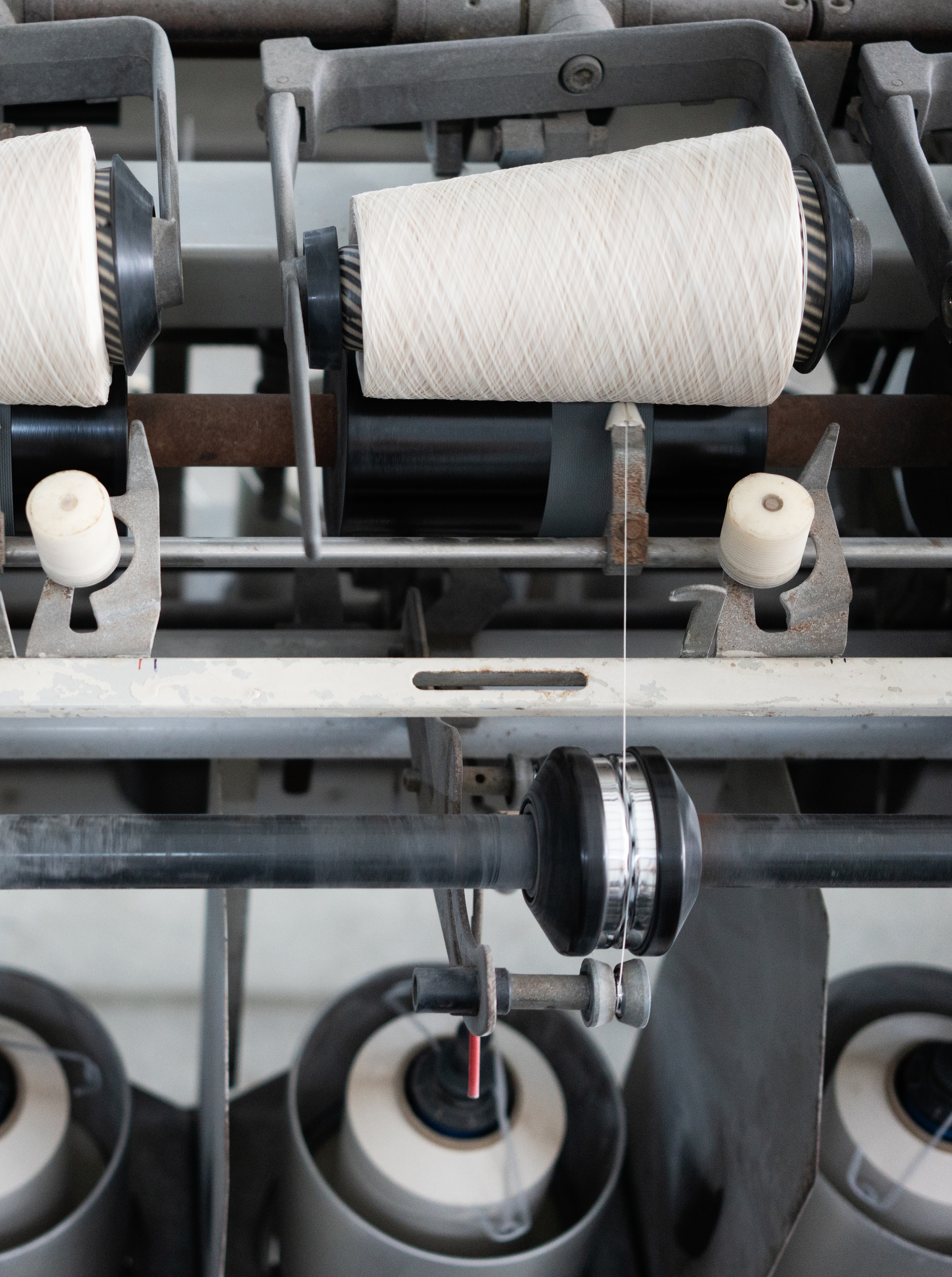
4. The paper strips are then spun into yarn.

=== Dyeing and weaving ===
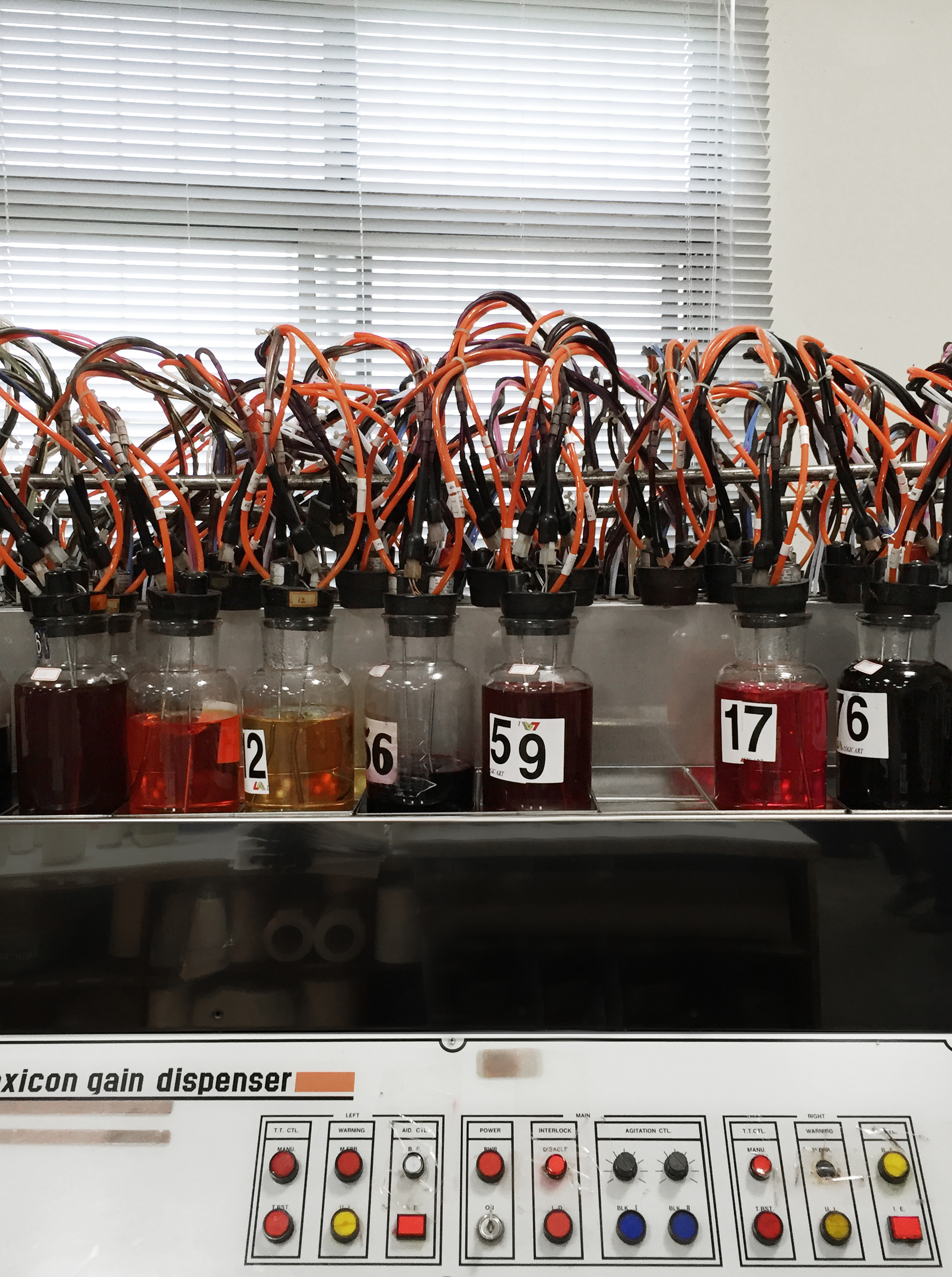
1. The natural white yarn is sent to Qwstion's dyeing and weaving partner in Tainan, Taiwan. They colour the yarn using the yarn dyeing method which is more sustainable than the roll dyeing alternative and certified OekoTex® Standard 100, the highest standard.

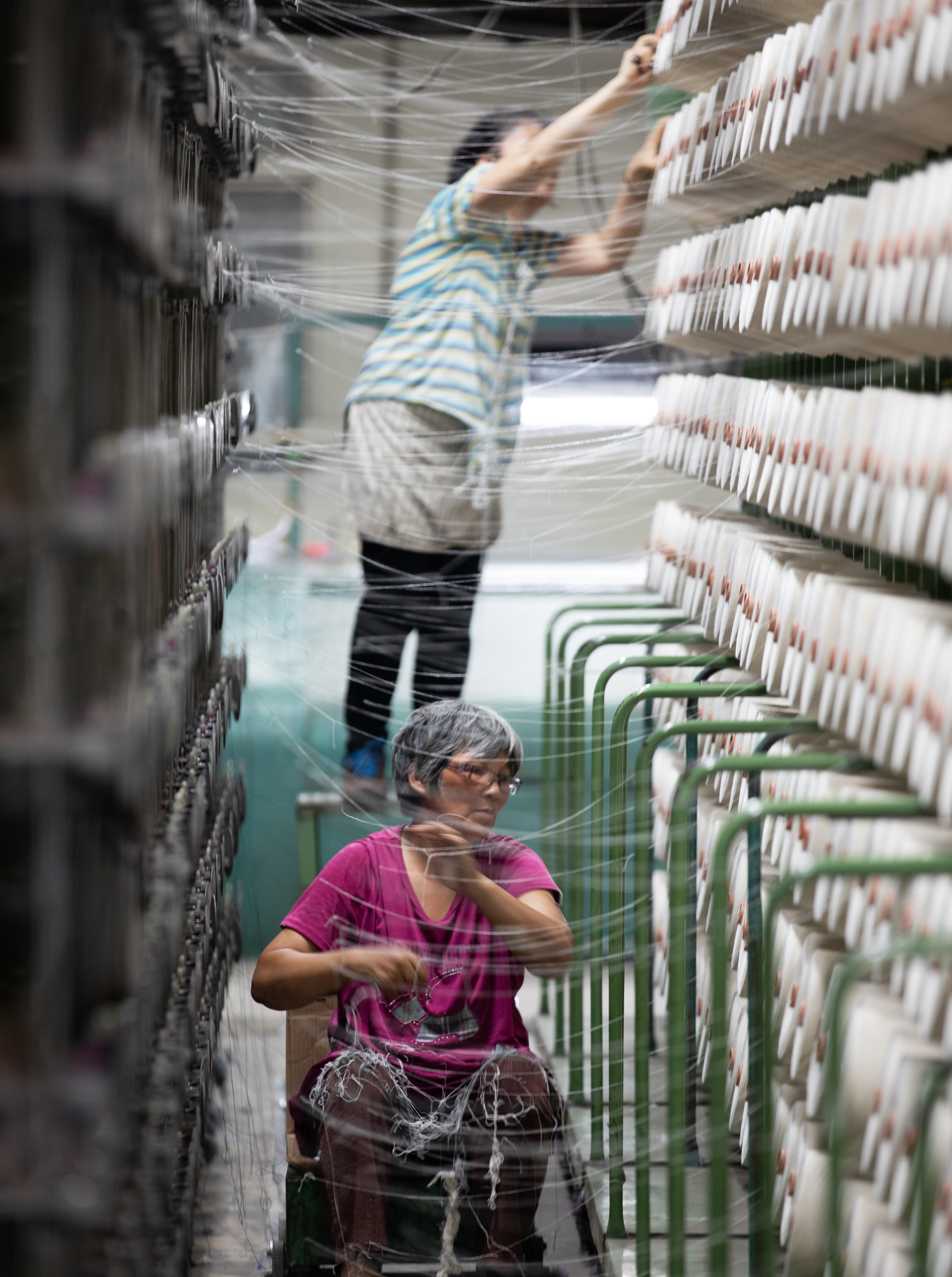
2. The warp yarns are then prepared for weaving.

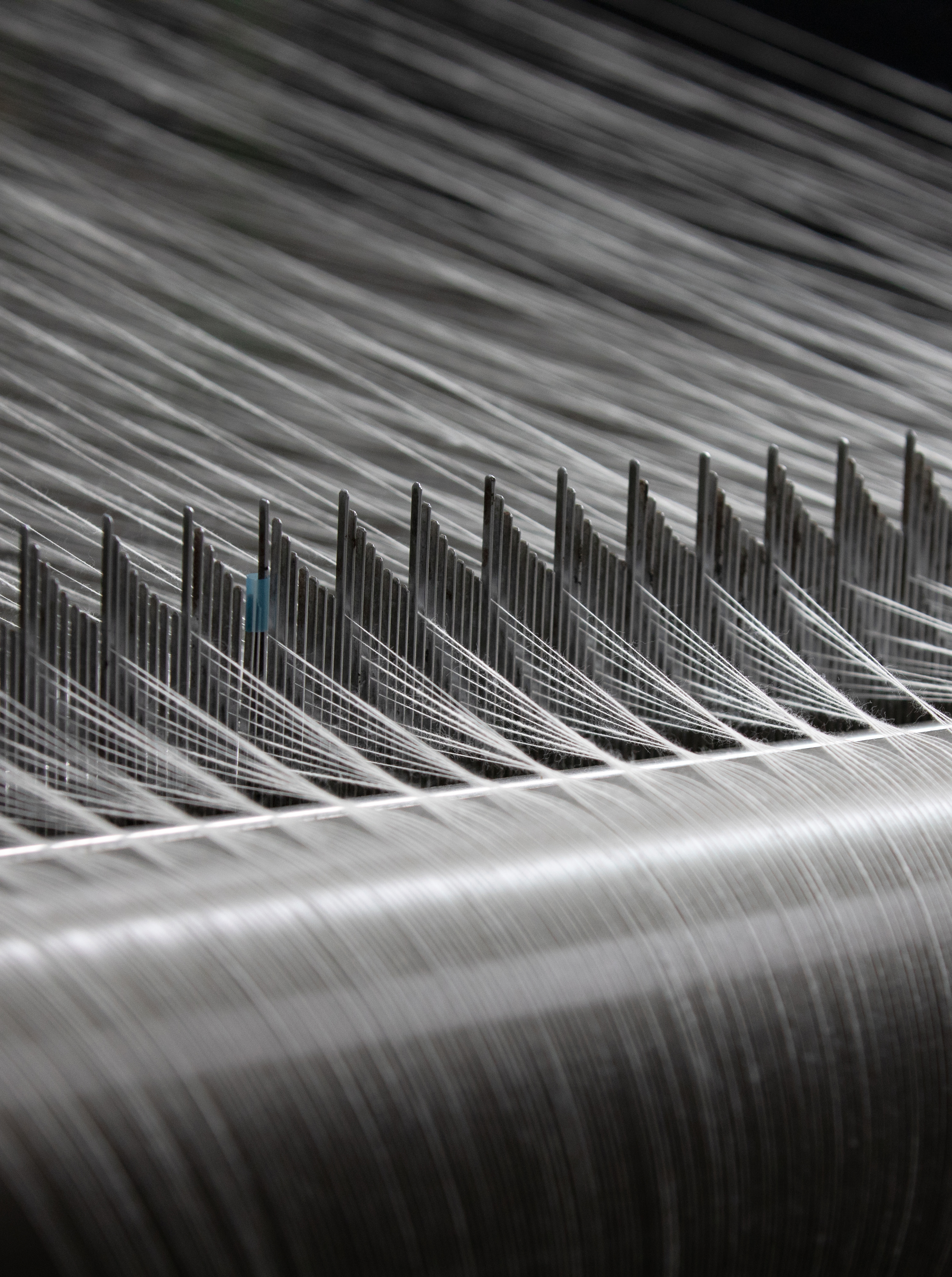
3. The yarn is then woven at extra high density.

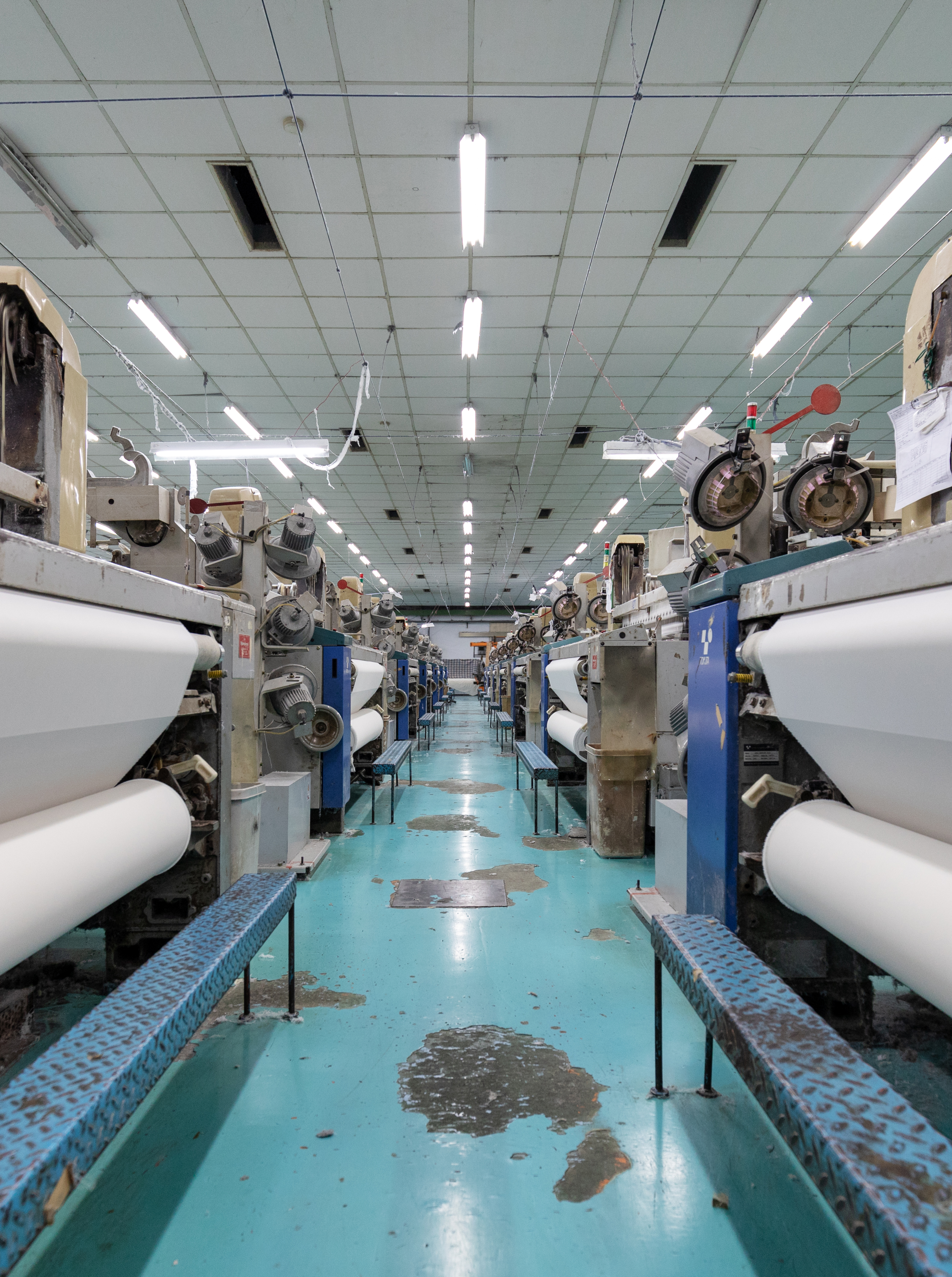
Weaving looms processing the Bananatex fabric.

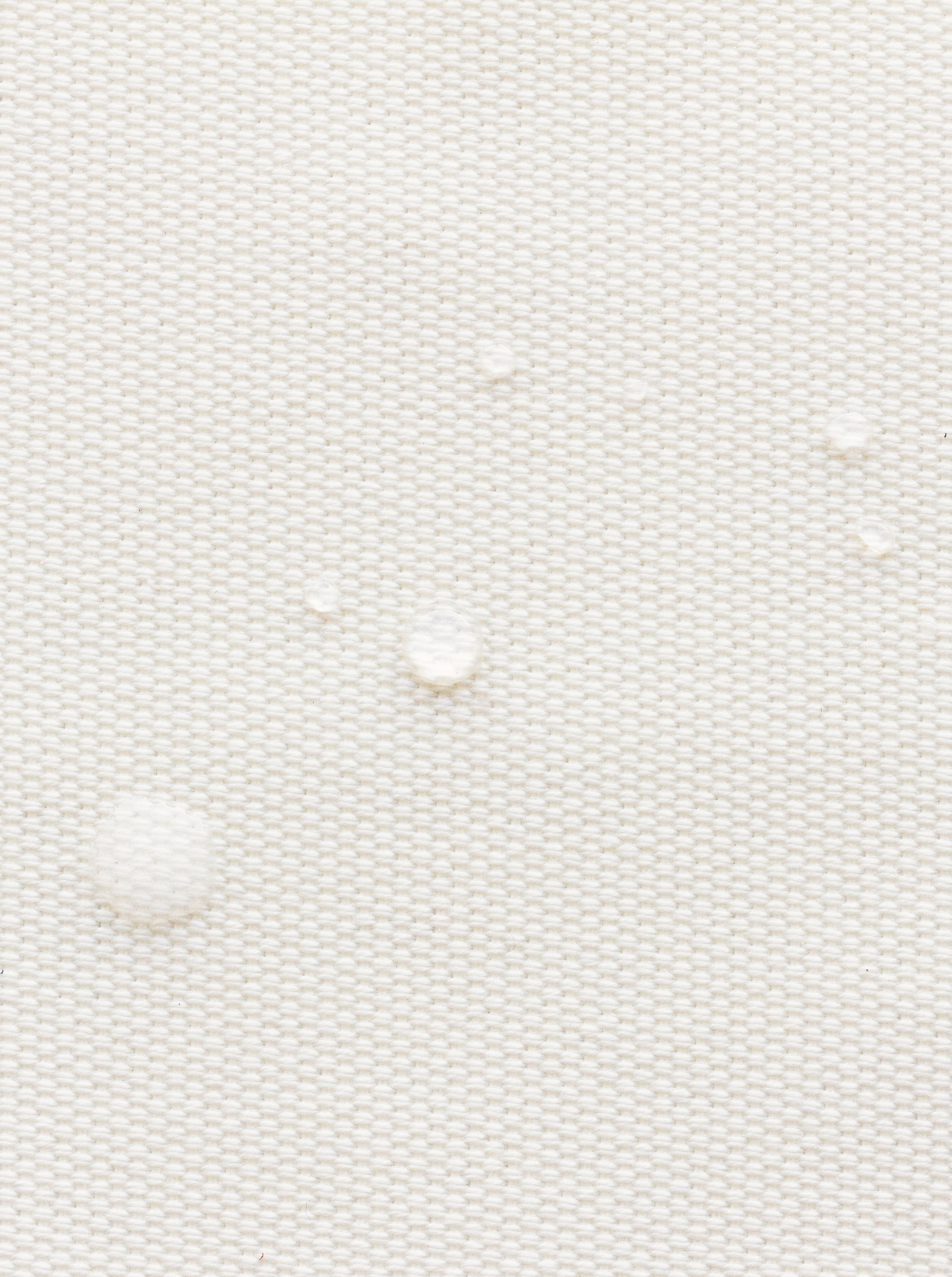
4. A natural beeswax coating is added to make the fabric waterproof.

== Products using Bananatex ==
Several companies use Banantex in their products:

- QWSTION: produce a range of bags and laptop sleeves.
- Good News x H&M: London footwear company Good News and H&M have collaborated on a range of sneakers.
- Magazin x Softline: Magazin and Danish furniture company Softline have produced a daybed with a Bananatex cover.
- PALAIUS: produces the MAE Chair, a handmade steel frame chair with Bananatex fabric.
- ISTO: A Portuguese clothing brand with a strong emphasis on transparency and sustainability have added Bananatex trousers and jackets to their clothing line.

== Material properties ==
The fibre of Abacá hemp has many different industrial applications due to its extremely high mechanical strength and length of 2 to 3 metres. These mechanical properties make Bananatex strong and durable, while also being soft, lightweight and flexible.

== Awards and prizes ==
- 2020: German Sustainability Award Design 2021 Winner (Category: Pioneers)
- 2019: Bundespreis Ecodesign Winner (Category: Product)
- 2019: Design Preis Schweiz Winner (Category: Textile Design)
- 2019: Green Product Award 2019, Category: Material for Bananatex® by QWSTION
- 2019: Cannes Corporate Media and TV Awards 2019, Gold in category: Marketing Communication B2C for Bananatex
- 2018: Goldener Hase, Category: Design for Bananatex by QWSTION
