= First aid room =

Room equipped and staffed for first aid

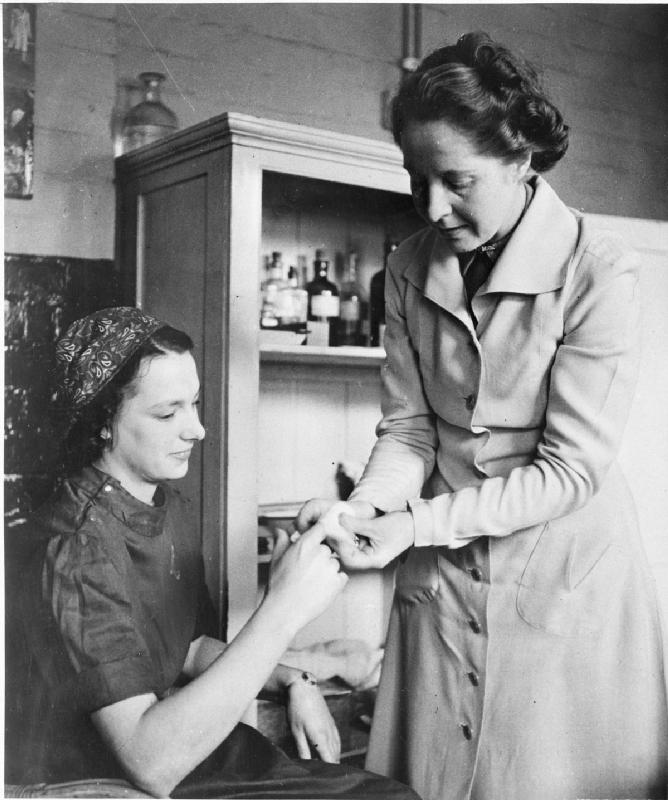
A worker receives first aid for a sore finger in a medical room, circa 1941

A first aid room, also known as an infirmary, medical room, or nurse's office, is a room in an establishment (e.g., a school, factory, sports venue, or airport) to which someone who is injured or taken ill on the premises can be taken for first aid and to await the arrival of professional emergency medical services.

According to guidance issued in 1981 in the UK, a first aid room should be clearly signposted, easily accessible, and contain the following:

- a sink and drinking water
- first aid materials (which may include protective equipment and blankets)
- an examination/medical couch
- a telephone or other communication equipment
- a record book for recording incidents

In the United Kingdom, a first aid room is required in some chemical factories, construction sites, and premises at a distance from medical services. In some cases, the room may be used for other purposes when not required for first aid.

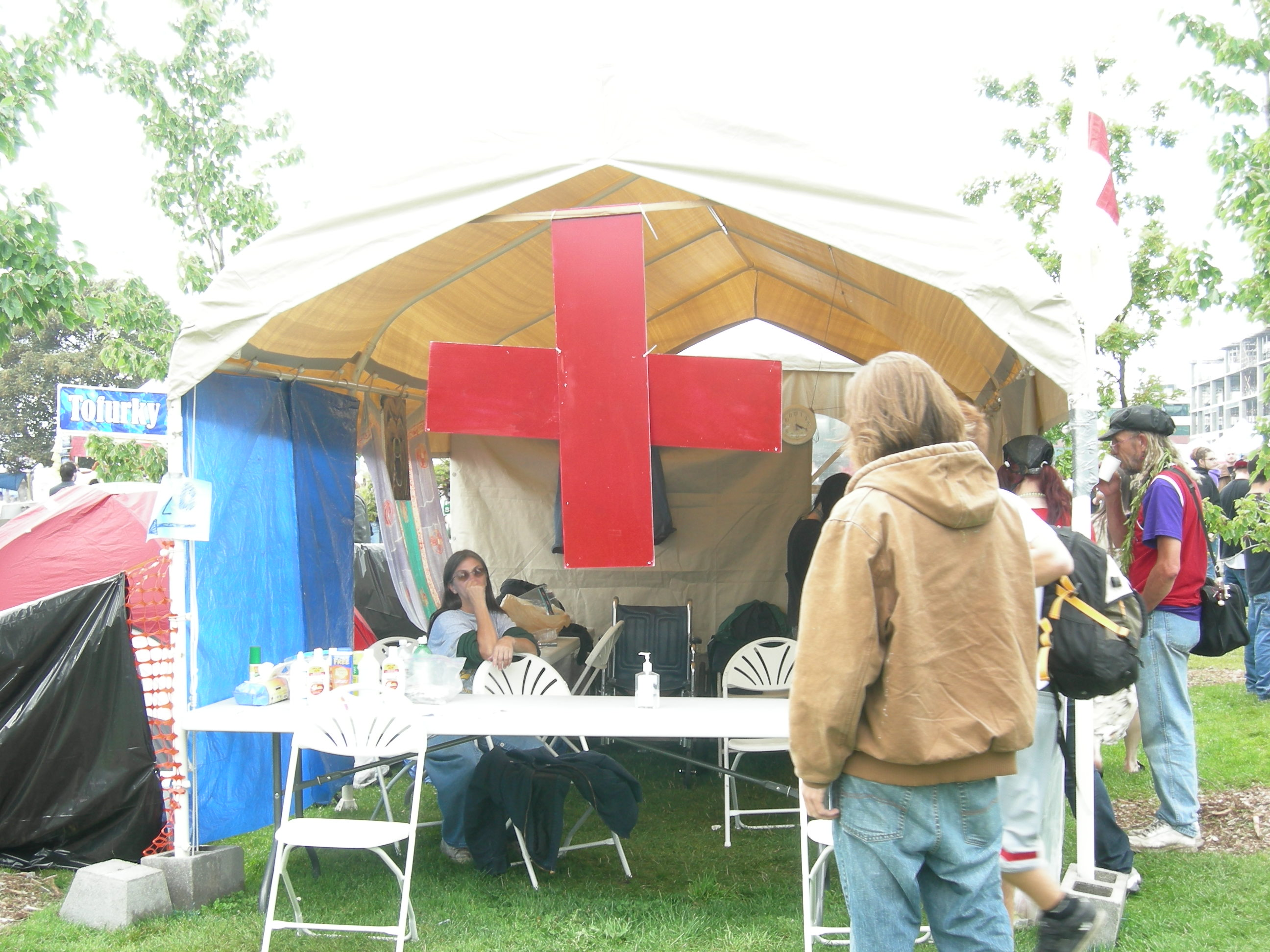
First aid station at a festival (United States, 2007)

A first aid station or first aid post is a staffed first aid room - especially a temporary one at a large gathering of people or an emergency incident.

== See also ==
- Sick bay (on ships)
- Fainting room (a room, used during the Victorian era, where women could go to rest when feeling faint)
- Examination room (a similar room in a medical facility)
- Occupational safety and health
