= Cominos House =

Historic building in Cairns, Queensland

- Cominos House at 27 Greenslopes Street, Cairns
- Interactive map of Cominos House
- 16°54′21.96″S 145°45′0.36″E
- Location: 27 Greenslopes Street, Manunda / Cairns, Queensland, Australia

History
- Built: c. 1880

Site notes
- Architectural style: Queenslander
- Owner: Cairns Regional Council
- Website: www.cominoshouse.com

Cominos House (built c.1880) is a local heritage listed, high set Queenslander originally built in the earliest period of Cairns' settlement, now serving as a publicly owned community Arts and Environment Centre in Cairns, Queensland. It is on the Local Heritage Register for displaying local building construction methods, craftsmanship and techniques now rarely seen in the Cairns area. It is also on the Local Heritage Register for the level of local community attachment and support shown in seeking to preserve this building. Researcher Coral Libke describes Cominos House as "one of the most well-known and best-loved buildings in Cairns".

== History ==
=== Private ownership ===
Cominos House was originally built on a block of land on the corner of Abbot and Florence Streets. The block had been granted in 1877 to Annie Street, whose husband, Alfred Street, was a builder and an elected member on Cairns' first Municipal Council. The Cairns Local Heritage listing estimates the date the building was constructed as being circa 1880.

The first recorded tenant of Cominos House was Mrs Liddle, who managed the building as a boarding house between 1886 and 1888. By 1901, and for the period 1901 to 1910, Cominos House was leased to William Lennon, a Member of the Parliament of Queensland for the Division of Herbert who served three terms as Lieutenant Governor of Queensland.

When the original owner of Cominos House, Annie Street, died in 1921, the house was sold first to a William Forbes, who in 1927 sold it to a Greek migrant, George Comino, who had founded a cafe on Abbott Street that became a prominent Cairns social hub and local catering establishment employing over 100 people. By 1952 George Comino had become ill and closed his cafe, dying in 1962 and leaving the family home to his widow Bylio Comino, who lived there until she died in 1977, after which the house stood vacant until 1986.

=== Public ownership ===
As Cominos House was built on land one block back from the Cairns waterfront, it was sold in 1986 to Girvan/Mur as a prime redevelopment site, and both Girvan/Mur and the Cominos family siblings offered the building to the Cairns City Council for relocation.

By October 1988 the building was relocated to 27 Greenslopes St, Manunda, where – as a result of the combined efforts of the Cairns City Council under Mayor Goodwin, the Cominos family (who donated $100 000 towards the effort) and volunteers (who had formed into the Friends of Cominos House) – the building was lifted to make room for a venue underneath, and the house was fully refurbished.

In December 1990, the refurbished building was being repainted in a traditional old Queenslander colour scheme, and Mayor John Cleland was reported in the local Cairns Post as saying the Cominos House restoration had been a combined community effort to retain a part of Cairns city's "colourful history", and the decision to do this had been "truly vindicated".

The official opening of Cominos House, to be a community Arts and Environment Centre managed by the Friends of Cominos House, was attended by the Queensland State Minister for Environment and Heritage, in 1991. From 1991 to 2025, the Friends of Cominos House maintained the building and managed the house as an Arts and Environment Centre and home for the Cairns and Far North Environment Centre, the Visual Arts Association, a museum display, and a space for community groups to meet and hold workshops.

Following some Council renovations in 2025, and following a competitive tendering process, as of June 2026, Cominos House remains a Cairns community hub until at least June 2036, managed by the Cairns and Far North Environment Centre.
