= Fainting room =

Victorian era room

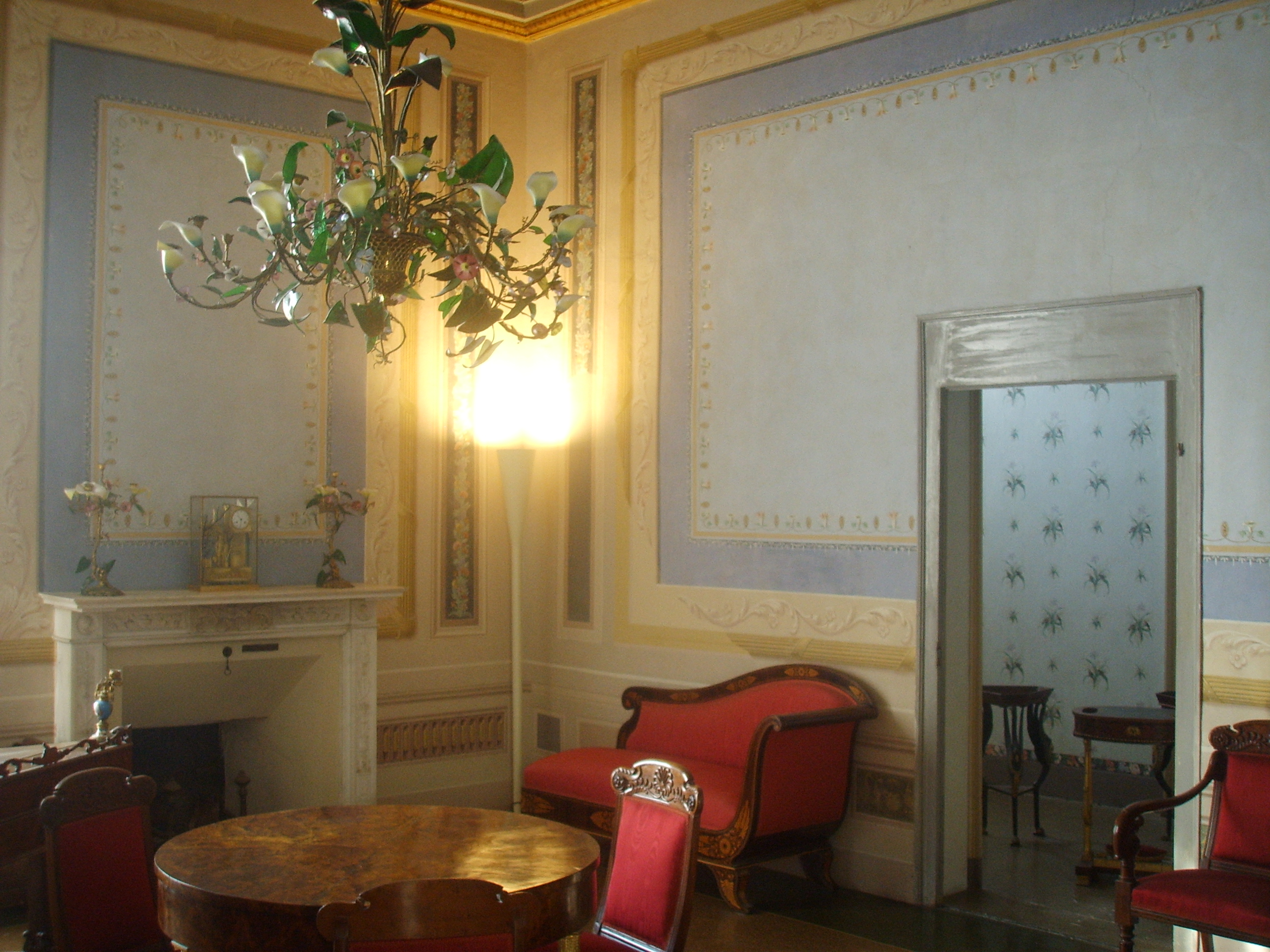
A fainting couch and a low table in Villa di Poggio in Caiano

A fainting room was a private room, common in the Victorian era, which typically contained fainting couches. Such couches or sofas typically had an arm on one side only to permit easy access to a reclining position, similar to its cousin the chaise longue, although the sofa style most typically featured a back at one end (usually the side with the arm) so that the resulting position was not purely supine.

There are also accounts that mention fainting rooms in eighteenth-century America. These rooms, which were also referred to as bedrooms (bedrooms were called chambers), were located in the ground floor and contained a daybed that allowed occupants to rest for brief periods during the day.

== Theories for prevalence ==
One theory for the predominance of fainting couches is that women were actually fainting because their corsets were laced too tightly, thus restricting blood flow. By preventing movement of the ribs, corsets restricted airflow to the lungs and, as a result, if the wearer exerted themselves to the point of needing large quantities of oxygen and was unable to fully inflate the lungs, this could lead to fainting. Hyperventilation for any reason could also potentially result in brief loss of consciousness. Historian Stephanie Celiberti writes that the term "fainting couch" is not documented until the 20th century, that there is nothing to suggest in advertising of the Victorian era that any article of furniture was created for people to use when feeling faint, and this should only be considered a myth.

One book associates Victorian fainting rooms with a claim that they were meant to force women to remain indoors and inactive under the guise of ensuring privacy and class, and are yet another example of how women were seen as inferior, at the time.

== See also ==
- Corset controversy
- Social aspects of clothing
