= Daybed =

Bed used for lounging, reclining, and sitting during the day

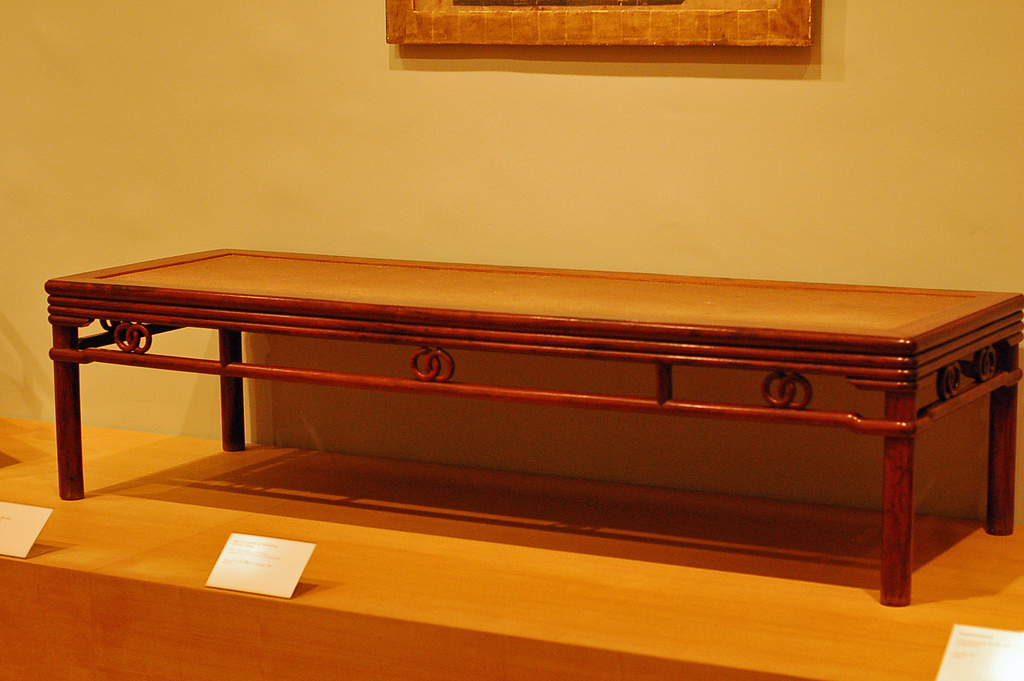
Chinese daybed from the Ming Dynasty

A daybed is an item of furniture used as a bed as well as for lounging, reclining, and seating in a common room. It may be considered a form of multifunctional furniture. Their frames can be made out of wood, metal, or a combination of wood and metal. They are a cross between a chaise longue, a couch, and a bed.

Daybeds typically feature a back and sides and may, for example, come in twin size (100 cm × 190 cm; 39 in × 75 in). Daybeds often feature a trundle to expand sleeping capacity.

== Modern daybeds ==
Many of today's daybeds employ a linkspring as the support system for the mattress. The linkspring is a rectangular metal frame (roughly the footprint of the mattress) with cross supports. A wire or polyester/nylon mesh held in place by a network of springs lies across the top of the linkspring. The linkspring design provides support and creates clearance underneath a daybed for storage.

There are two categories of modern daybeds, indoor and outdoor. Daybeds can be hanging or stable; outdoor day beds usually have a roof-like structure to protect them from sunlight, whereas indoor daybeds are simple.

An infant bed can be converted into a daybed by removing one side.

== See also ==
- Bed size
- Fainting room
- Futon
- Knole sofa
