= Manolo de los Santos =

Bishop

The Most Reverend Manolo de los Santos D.D.
- Bishop Emeritus of Virac
- Diocese: Virac
- Appointed: 12 August 1994
- Installed: 12 September 1994
- Retired: 29 February 2024
- Predecessor: José C. Sorra
- Successor: Luisito Occiano, D.D.

Orders
- Ordination: 7 May 1974
- Consecration: 12 September 1994 by José Tomás Sánchez

Personal details
- Born: August 5, 1947 (age 79) Basud, Camarines Norte
- Residence: 4800 Bishop's Residence, Fiat Village, Cavinitan, Virac, Catanduanes, Philippines.
- Motto: In Nomine Domini
- Coat of arms

Manolo Alarcon de los Santos (born August 5, 1947, in Basud, Camarines Norte) is the current bishop emeritus of the Diocese of Virac.

== Priesthood ==
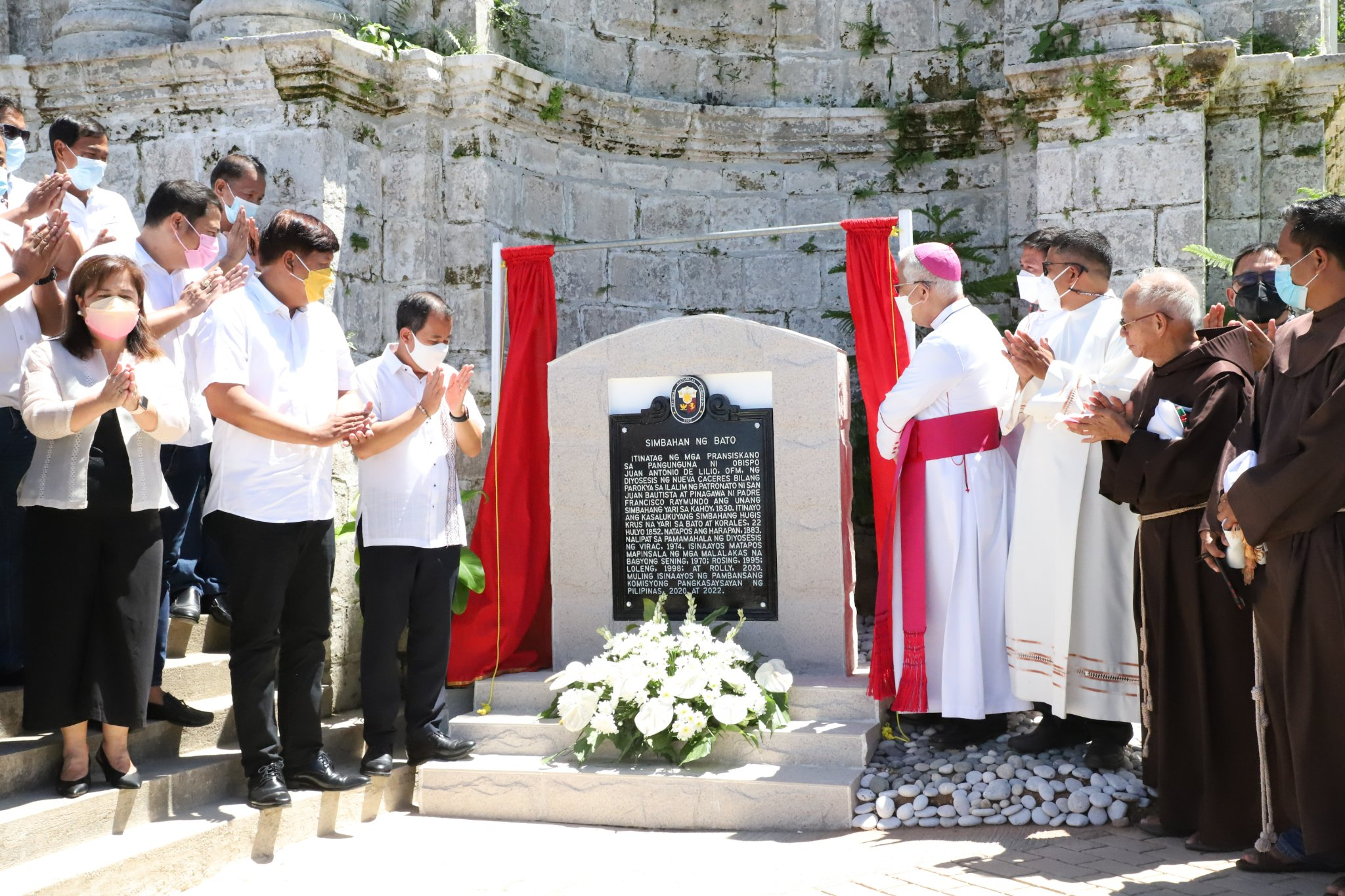
Bishop de los Santos (person immediately to the right of the historical marker with a red zucchetto) unveiling the historical marker for the Parish Church of St. John the Baptist in Bato, Catanduanes in 2022

He was ordained to the priesthood on May 7, 1974, as a priest of the Archdiocese of Caceres. On August 12, 1994, Pope John Paul II appointed him Bishop of Diocese of Virac. The prefect of the Congregation for the clergy, Cardinal Jose Tomas Sanchez, consecrated him on September 12, 1994, as the bishop. His principal co-consecrators were the Apostolic Nuncio to the Philippines, Archbishop Gian Vincenzo Moreni, and the Archbishop of Caceres, Leonard Zamora Legaspi.

== Sources ==
- Manolo de los Santos at catholic-hierarchy.org
