= DZAA =

Double A Padaba FM (DZAA)
- Virac; Philippines
- Broadcast area: Catanduanes, parts of Camarines Sur
- Frequency: 93.3 MHz
- Branding: Double A 93.3 Padaba FM

Programming
- Languages: Bicolano, Filipino
- Format: Contemporary MOR, News, Talk

Ownership
- Owner: Our Lady's Foundation

History
- First air date: 2009

Technical information
- Licensing authority: NTC
- Power: 5 kW

Double A 93.3 Padaba FM (DZAA 93.3 MHz) is an FM station owned and operated by Our Lady's Foundation. Its studios and transmitter are located at Virac, Catanduanes.
