= Catanduanes State University =

Public university in Catanduanes, Philippines

- Pamantasang Pampamahalaan ng Catanduanes (Filipino)
- Former names: Virac National & Agricultural Trade School (1961–1971); Catanduanes State Colleges (1971–2012)
- Motto: Excellence, Commitment and Sustainability
- Type: State Research Non-profit Coeducational Higher education institution
- Established: 1961
- Academic affiliations: PASUC; AACCUP
- President: Dr. Gemma G. Acedo
- Vice-president: Dr. Arthur I. Tabirara (VP for Administration & Finance); Dr. Kristian Q. Aldea (VP for Academic Affairs); Dr. Roberto B. Barba, Jr. (VP for Research, Extension and Production)
- Administrative staff: c. 500
- Students: 15,000
- Location: Virac, Catanduanes, Philippines; 13°35′02″N 124°12′38″E
- Campus: Main: Virac Satellite: Panganiban
- Colors: Blue and gold
- Sporting affiliations: SCUAA
- Website: www.catanduanesstateu.edu.ph
- Location in Catanduanes Location in Luzon Location in the Philippines

Catanduanes State University (CatSU; Filipino: Pamantasang Pampamahalaan ng Catanduanes) is a regional state, research and coeducational higher education institution and a green university in Virac, Catanduanes, Philippines, with external campus in Panganiban. CatSU is an ISO 9001:2015 certified public university.

== History ==
The Catanduanes State University (CatSU) was established in Virac as the Virac National and Agricultural Trade School (VNATS) via the Republic Act 3398 dated June 18, 1961.

Catanduanes congressman José M. Alberto authored Republic Act 6341 which convertedthe VNATS into the Catanduanes State Colleges (CSC) on June 19, 1971. It started functioning as a tertiary education institution on December 1, 1971.

The Catanduanes Agricultural and Industrial College (CAIC) in Panganiban was integrated to CSC on October 31, 1999.

On October 19, 2012, President Benigno S. Aquino III signed Republic Act No. 10299 converting Catanduanes State Colleges (CSC) into Catanduanes State University (CatSU).

This institution is categorized as SUC Level III-A. Catanduanes State University is a comprehensive Higher Education Institution in the island province of Catanduanes and one of the dynamic SUCs in the region, offering a wide range of academic programs.

== Organization and administration ==
Presidents of the Catanduanes State Colleges
Mr. Pedro G. Tabuzo	1971–1972
Dr. Jacinto A. Medallada	1972–1986
Dr. Rodolfo V. Azanza	1986–1990
Dr. Ernestina P. Averilla	1990–1992
Dr. Adolfo S. Bagadiong	1993–2003
Dr. Asuncion V. Asetre	2003–2011
Dr. Minerva I. Morales	2011–2012

Presidents of the Catanduanes State University
Dr. Minerva I. Morales	2013–2020
Dr. Patrick Alain T. Azanza	2021–2025
Dr. Gemma G. Acedo	2025–present

The governance of the university is vested in the Board of Regents, abbreviated as BOR.

The Chairperson of the Commission on Higher Education (CHED) serves as the Board's Chairperson while the President of the Catanduanes State University is the vice-chairman. The Chairpersons of the Committees of Higher Education of the Senate and the House of Representatives are also members of the University Board of Regents which are concurrent with their functions as committee chairpersons.

The university students is represented by a Student Regent, which is also the President of the CatSU Federated College Student Council. While the Faculty Regent is nominated by the faculty members of the CatSU Federated Faculty Union. And the University Alumni are represented by the President of the CatSU Alumni Association.

As of 2021, the members of the Board of Regents of the Catanduanes State University are:

Board of Regents
Chairman	Dr. Shirley C. Agrupis	Chairperson of the Commission on Higher Education
Vice Chairman	Dr. Gemma G. Acedo	President of the Catanduanes State University
Member	Hon. Win Gatchalian	Senator, Chairman – Senate Committee on Education
Member	Hon. Eulogio Rodriguez	Rep. Jude A. Acidre, Chairman – House of Representative Committee on Higher Technical Education
Member	Hon. Edna Cynthia S. Berces	Regional Director, National Economic Development Authority RO5
Member	Hon. Rommel R. Serrano	Regional Director, Department of Science and Technology RO5
Member	Hon. Rosanna S. Abundo	President, Federated Faculty Association Inc.
Member	Hon. Ramil Joselito B. Tamayo	President, Federated Alumni Association
Member	Hon. Alexis Aurea T. Cabrera	Student Regent (OIC)
Member	Hon. Aida A. Dianela	Private Sector Representative
Member	Hon. Luzviminda T. Oropesa	Private Sector Representative
Board Secretary	Atty. Nikko Rey Aicetel Manlangit-Santelices	Interim Board Secretary

=== President of the Catanduanes State University ===
- Dr. Gemma G. Acedo

Vice Presidents of the Catanduanes State University
Academic Affairs	Dr. Kristian Q. Aldea
Administration and Financial Affairs	Dr. Arthur I. Tabirara
Research and Extension and Production Affairs	Dr. Roberto B. Barba, Jr.

== Facilities and services ==
=== Admission and Registration ===
This office facilitates the admission and registration of students during the enrollment period. Other services such as the preparation and issuance of transcript of records, certifications, clearances, honorable dismissals and evaluation of student records are also undertaken by the admission and registration Office (ARO).

=== Guidance and Testing Services ===
This office has a wide range of services such as conducting the CSU College Entrance Examinations (CSUCET), administering English Placement Tests, academic advising and career counseling.

=== Placement and Alumni Services ===
This office informs student and graduates of the Colleges regarding possible employment opportunities. It keeps close contact with CSU graduates and awards annually the most outstanding alumni of the school. It also coordinates the organization of the CSU Alumni Association, the holding of jobs fair and the Special Program for Employment of Students (SPES).

=== CatSU Multi-Purpose Cooperative ===
The CSU Multi-Purpose Cooperative provides wholesome snacks and nutritious meals to students and employees of the CatSU. Catering Services are also rendered upon request. Various items are available at the canteen such as school supplies, groceries, cosmetics and other commodities.

=== Cashiering Services ===
Facilitates collection of school fees and release of scholarship benefits.

=== Catanduanes Internet Network (CATNET) ===
The Catanduanes Internet Network (CATNET) is a test-bed project under the Government Information Sharing Technology Network (GISNET) which is a program within the telecommunications component of the National Information Technology Plan (NITP) 2000. Envisioned to provide the students of Catanduanes improved access to information, the CATNET is managed and operated by the CSU. At present, CATNET serves as the laboratory of CSU Students in the Information Management and Information Technology programs. It is also open to all students conducting research works.

=== CatSU Multi-Purpose Covered Court ===
Situated at the back of the CSU Administration Building. It is also an arena for PE classes, induction balls, election rallies, similar related activities and even graduation ceremonies.

=== Student Center ===
The CSU Student Center provides accommodation to the offices of the Supreme Student Council (SSC) and the Office of the Student Services, respectively.
