= Eulogio Rodriguez (politician born 1959) =

Filipino politician

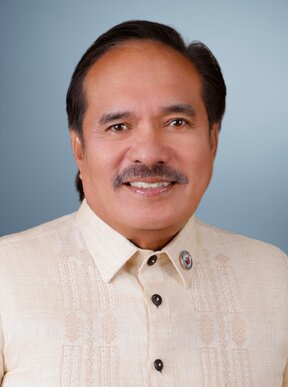
- Official portrait, 2025

Member of the Philippine House of Representatives from Catanduanes's at-large district
- Incumbent
- Assumed office June 30, 2022
- Preceded by: Hector Sanchez

Mayor of Bato, Catanduanes
- In office June 30, 2016 – June 30, 2019
- Preceded by: Juan Rodulfo
- Succeeded by: Juan Rodulfo
- In office June 30, 2010 – June 30, 2013
- Preceded by: Juan Rodulfo
- Succeeded by: Juan Rodulfo

Personal details
- Born: Eulogio Rante Rodriguez; May 10, 1959 (age 67)
- Party: PFP (2024–present)
- Other political affiliations: Independent (2015–2018; 2021–2024); UNA (2018–2021); Liberal (2012–2015); NPC (2009–2012)
- Occupation: Politician

Eulogio Rante "Leo" Rodriguez (born May 10, 1959) is a Filipino politician currently serving as the House representative from Catanduanes' at-large congressional district. He previously served as mayor of Bato, Catanduanes, and has run multiple times for local executive and legislative positions.

== Political career ==
=== Mayor of Bato ===
Rodriguez served as mayor of Bato, Catanduanes in 2010 and 2016. He ran unsuccessfully in 2019 for the same position.

=== House of Representatives ===
In 2022, Rodriguez was elected as the Representative of Catanduanes’ Lone District, succeeding Hector Sanchez. In 2025, he was again elected as Catanduanes Lone District's sole representative.

=== Election-related incidents ===
During the 2022 election campaign, Rodriguez was reportedly the victim of a robbery at his residence in Barangay Batalay, Bato. Armed men allegedly stole ₱20 million in cash and other valuables while he was attending a campaign rally in Virac. A Special Investigation Task Group (SITG) led by the Catanduanes police and the National Bureau of Investigation was formed to probe the incident.

== Personal life ==
Rodriguez is known by the nickname Leo. His daughter Vanessa ran for mayor of Bato, Catanduanes in the 2025 elections, but lost to incumbent mayor Juan Rodulfo.
