= Virac, Catanduanes =

Capital of Catanduanes, Philippines

Virac
- Municipality
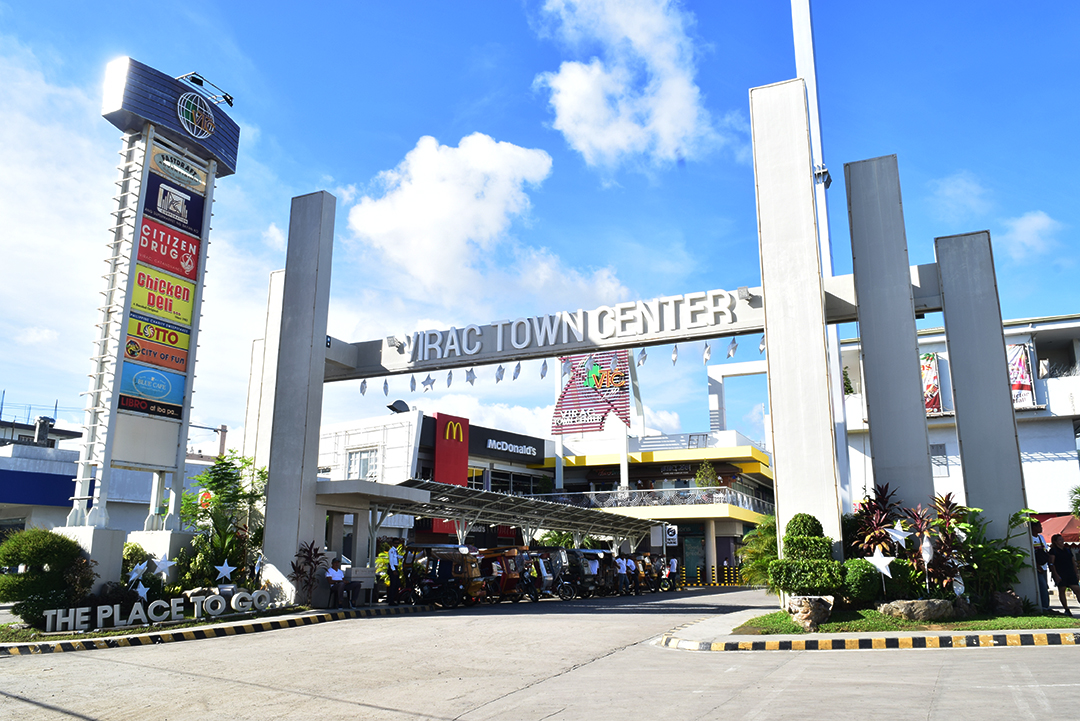
- Virac Town Center

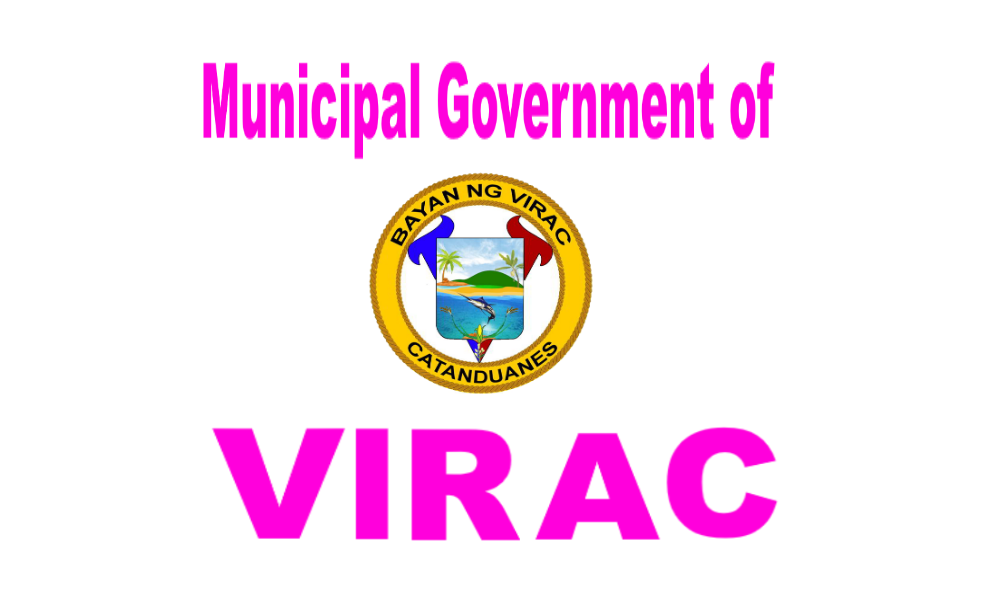
- Flag Seal

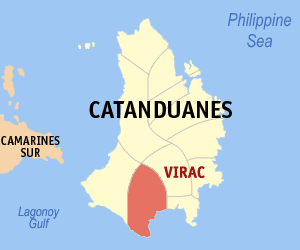
- Map of Catanduanes with Virac highlighted
- Interactive map of Virac
- Location within the Philippines
- Coordinates: 13°35′N 124°14′E
- Country: Philippines
- Region: Bicol Region
- Province: Catanduanes
- District: Lone district
- Founded: 1775
- Barangays: 63 (see Barangays)

Government
  - Type: Sangguniang Bayan
  - Mayor: Sinforoso M. Sarmiento Jr.
  - Vice Mayor: Lemuel P. Surtida
  - Representative: Eulogio R. Rodriguez
  - Municipal Council: Members: Hazel C. Isidoro; Fredeswindo A. Gianan Jr.; Joseph L. Mendoza; Anthony A. Arcilla; Angelo Piolo M. Laynes; Ariel G. Molina; Rafael C. Zuniega; Alexander S. Abundo; Liga ng mga Barangay President; Danilo A. Romero; Sangguniang Kabataan President; Lyle Benson Cabrera
  - Electorate: 51,662 voters (2025)

Area
  - Total: 152.40 km^{2} (58.84 sq mi)
- Elevation: 96 m (315 ft)

Population (2024 census)
  - Total: 75,135
  - Density: 493.01/km^{2} (1,276.9/sq mi)
  - Households: 16,951

Economy
  - Income class: 1st municipal income class
  - Poverty incidence: 14.52% (2023)
  - Revenue: ₱ 355.7 million (2024)
  - Assets: ₱ 1,548 million (2024)
  - Expenditure: ₱ 371.4 million (2024)
  - Liabilities: ₱ 161 million (2024)

Service provider
  - Electricity: First Catanduanes Electric Cooperative (FICELCO)
- Time zone: UTC+8 (PST)
- ZIP code: 4800
- PSGC: 0502011000
- IDD : area code: +63 (0)52
- Native languages: Bicol
- Website: www.virac-catanduanes.gov.ph

Virac, officially the Municipality of Virac, is a municipality and capital of the province of Catanduanes, Philippines. According to the 2024 census, it has a population of 75,135 people.

It is most populous and fifth largest in land area in Catanduanes.

== History ==
=== Pre-Spanish period ===
Civilization first touched the island province of Catanduanes in the thirteenth century, with the arrival of the scions of ten Bornean datus who were then traversing through the islets of the Philippine Archipelago. By the middle of the fourteenth century, organized communities could be seen throughout Catanduanes – a consequence of the rapid development of Southeastern Luzon initiated by the Malay settlers.

Virac, the capital town of the island province of Catanduanes, started its primitive annals in pre-Spanish times when tribal chieftain Lumibao, scion of Datu Dumaguil who came to the Philippines with the 10 Bornean datus and his wife Milbigan settled near Vidak spring and founded the first civilized settlement with a score of servant followers and their wives.

=== Spanish period ===
It was the Spanish conquistador Juan de Salcedo who first brought Spanish galleons to the waters of Catanduanes in 1573. His purpose then was to capture and punish pirates who carried on their nefarious trade in Camarines Sur, Sorsogon and Western Catanduanes. His galleon returned a few weeks later – this time, his mission was to spread the Catholic faith.

While at bay, the port guard saw smoke rising from the mountain Eli. After dropping anchor, the Spaniards tracked down footprints from the shore which reached a sitio called Vidak. They eventually came upon a large kaingin in Timbean, situated between the barangays of Danicop and Calatagan.

The chieftain of the village had his hut built a little above a spring which still exists today. There was a reception hall conveniently shaded by a tree known as sambong. This tree eventually served as the guidon to the couple's place.

It is said that the Spaniards could not approach the hut of the chieftain because of three huge fierce-looking dogs and several guards who had their spears drawn toward the foreigners. However, the Spaniards determined to succeed in their mission, returned the threatening acts of the natives with gesture of friendship.

A piece of "onchita" was offered to the chieftain as a gift; but this was rejected by the chieftain when his wife said “we have many pieces of gold in our kingdom”. A silver piece was next offered, but this was similarly rejected by the chieftain and his wife. Reaching for some refined sugar, the Spaniards let the natives taste the sweetness of the substance. The chieftain's wife liked the taste. Thus begun the “sweet” relation between the natives and the Spaniards.

Soon after the first encounters, the Spaniards started giving the natives provisions not found in the chieftain's hut, such as more sugar and clothing. After the seed of friendship had taken roots, the Spaniards began spreading their message of Christianity. Lumibao was baptized as Jose and Milbigan as Maria. Their son, who lived at the bank of Macacao, was converted to Christianity with the name of Mariano.

Records regarding the Christianization of Virac were lost, reportedly due to vandalism by the Moros. The history of this capital town began to be accurately recorded only from the year 1755. The year 1818 census shows that Virac had 1,581 native families and 91 Spanish-Filipino families.

==== Moro raids ====
Moros from Mindanao conducted raids on Catanduanes. Knowing the strength of the coastal batteries of the Virac harbor, the vintas divided into groups and landed at various places or points farther from the range of the coastal batteries. Some landed at Cadaculaan and others way out to points east and west of Virac.

Don Matias Soliman, a famous Moro fighter, engaged in battle and killed a Moro Datu named Mohammed Abu after a bloody encounter in sitio Hopog of Barrio Santo Domingo, Virac. He was aided by the swift-handed and hoarse voiced Don Alipio Alejandro alias Paas.

The non-Christian invaders were superior in arms and number until Don Alipio, with an exotic force, turned the tide. The Moros could not move further, hence, they retreated in defeat.

On the eastern end of Virac, the Moros succeeded in gaining a beach-head in Catanduanes and from there, attacked the town from the east. The Cabeza de Barangay of Francia, Don Pedro Tolentino alias Pantino, lost no time in giving their all against the enemy. This was the first time the people of Virac totally and successfully resisted an organized invasion.

=== American occupation ===
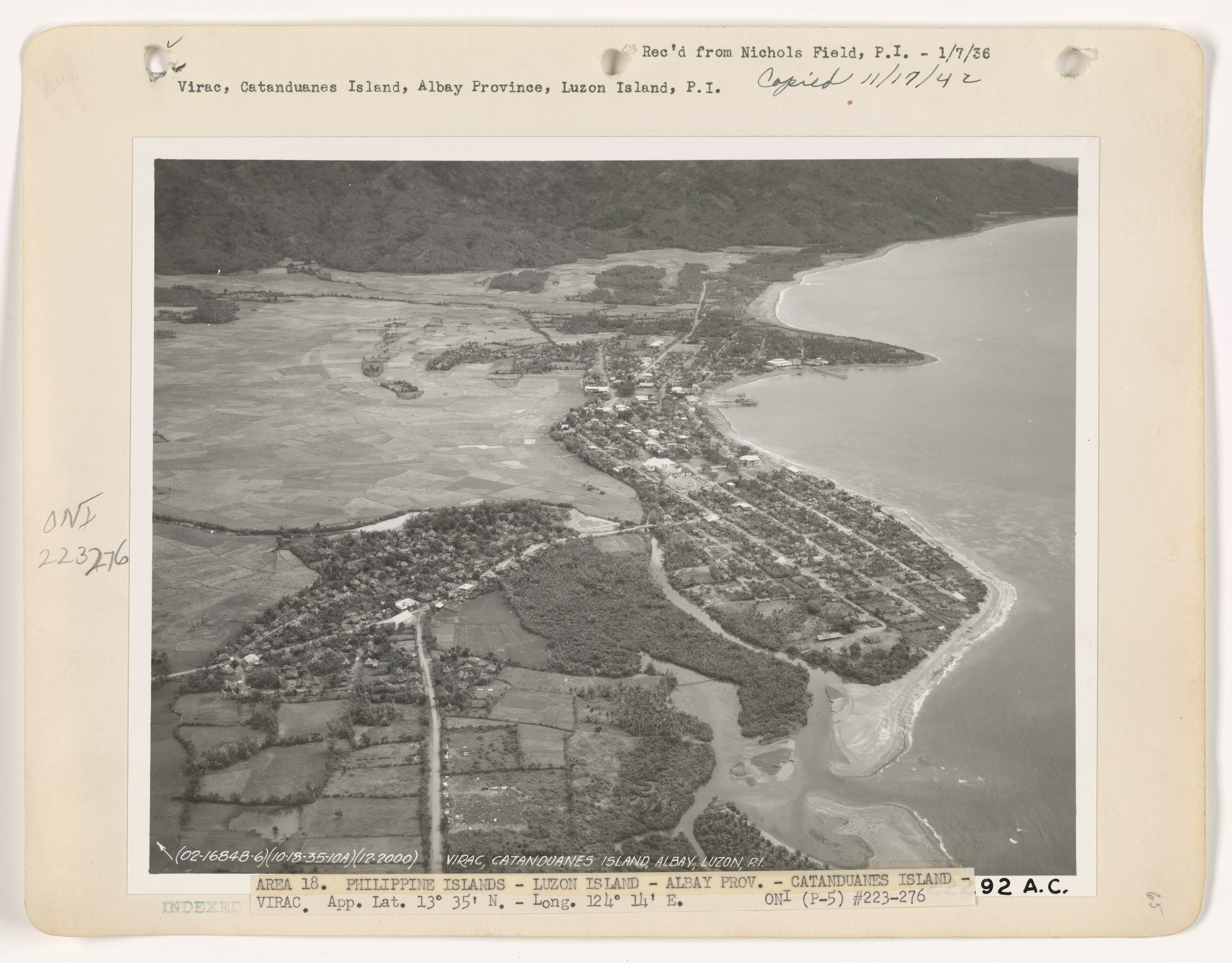
Aerial view of Virac, circa 1930s

A few months after Emilio Aguinaldo, the first president of the First Philippine Republic took his oath of allegiance to America after losing in the Philippine–American War, a battleship dropped anchor in Virac. The American soldiers were on a mission to expedite the surrender of the local Revolutionists or Katipuneros. Not eager to relinquish their hard-fought freedom, the Katipuneros refused to recognize the sovereignty of the United States and fled to the mountains.

In the later part of 1898, when Don Leon Reyes was the incumbent Capitan Municipal [town mayor] of Virac, the revolutionary troops who refused American Administration, came down from the mountains to rally for the common cause. Don Leon Reyes readily welcomed the revolutionists and financed their cause in fighting the Americans. This state of affairs was tactfully handled by the Capitan who spent almost all of his fortunes for the cause. For his patriotic zeal, he was manacled, chained and sentenced to hard labor by the Americans in 1901.

The American occupation ended in 1934 before the establishment of the Philippine Commonwealth in 1935.

=== Japanese Invasion ===
Catanduanes was not spared by the forces of the Kamakura Regiment. Airborne planes were cited at the southern portion of Virac in the morning of December 12, 1941, while vessels dropped anchor near Nagngangang Buaya Point, Cabugao Bay. At 9:30 in the morning of said day, towns were totally evacuated. Bombs were soon strategically dropped.

Later, garrisons were established in town and the municipal building was also used as a garrison. No school was regularly opened during the Japanese Occupation. Guerrilla organizations came and went.

=== Liberation ===
The Liberation of Catanduanes took place in what is now the municipal building and the Virac Parish Church area. On February 8, 1945, the battle started at Km. 4 at Barangay Calatagan at about 12 noon, and ended with the Filipino guerrillas of the Catanduanes Liberation Force taking full control of the Japanese barracks.

On April 20, 1945, Florencio Tacorda, the only three-term municipal president, some two and a half decades before the war, was designated mayor of Virac. He served for six months and twenty-five days during the Philippine Civil Affairs Unit regime.

=== Pre and Martial Law Era ===
From 1958 to 1970, Salvador Surtida took over followed by Jorge Arcilla from 1970 to 1986, two of the longest reigning local executives in the history of Virac. This period witnessed the ascendancy to national prominence of the Alberto brothers, Juan, Jose and Vicente, who brought progress and influenced the massive physical transformation of the municipality when Salvador Surtida and Jorge Arcilla were mayors. Foremost among the many infrastructure projects were the Catanduanes State Colleges and the Eastern Bicol Medical Center which made Virac a major educational and health center in the Bicol Region.

The growth of Virac in terms of governance peaked in 1972. From the original 34 barangays in 1960, Virac was able to establish 29 new communities to upgrade to the present composition of 63 barangays.

=== EDSA Revolution and beyond ===
The EDSA Revolution in 1986 that toppled down the more than two decades of Marcos regime had a domino effect on the political structure of Virac. The replacement of the elected officials by appointed officials was in accordance with the Freedom Constitution which predominated during the revolutionary government from 1986 to 1992. Rodulfo Sarmiento, a doctor by profession, led the municipal government.

The early nineties saw the alternate changing of local governance between Rodulfo Sarmiento and Jose "Cito" Alberto II, the son of Congressman Jose Alberto.

== Geography ==
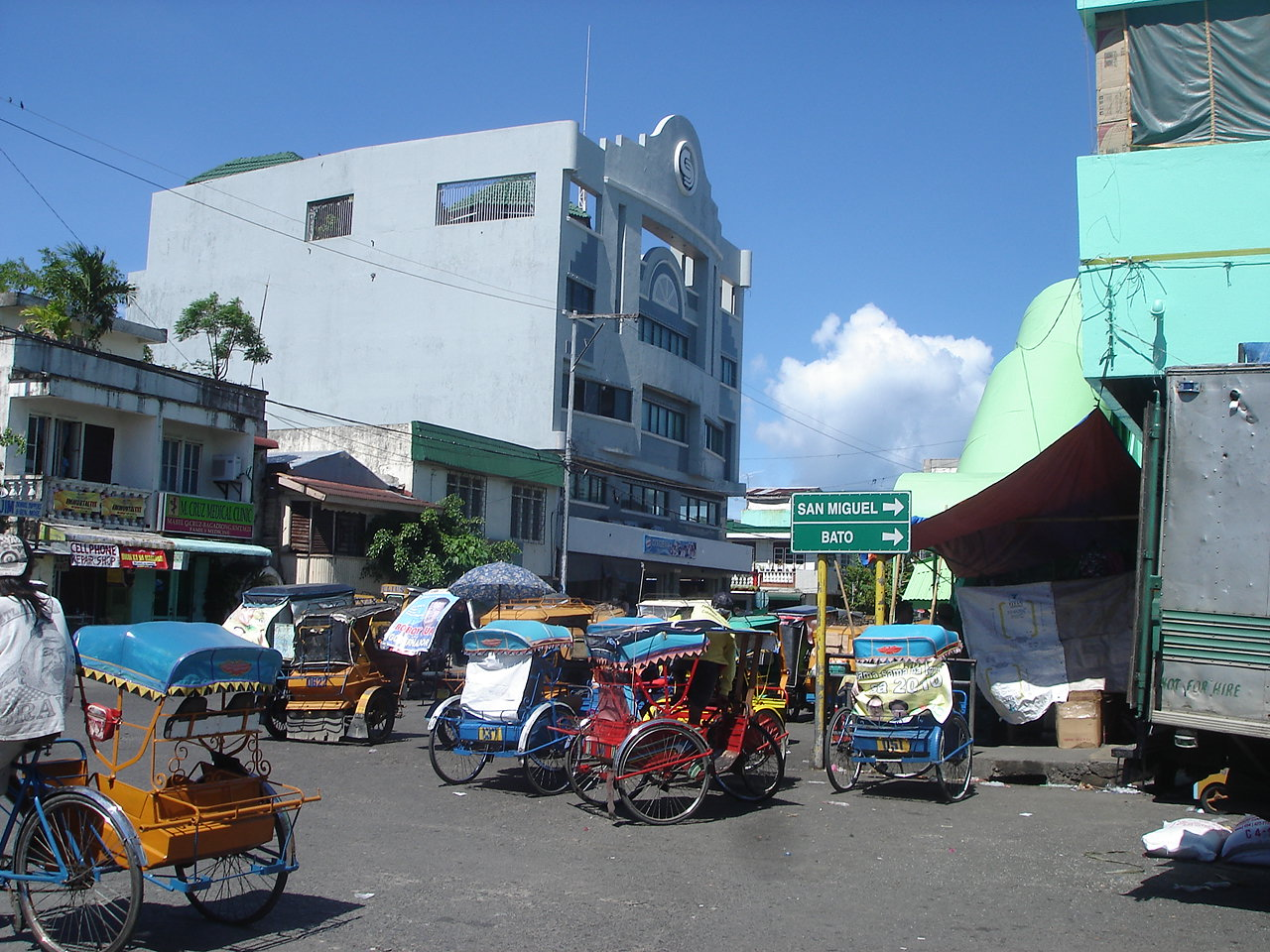
Poblacion of Virac

The municipality of Virac occupies the southern tip of the island province. It has a total land area of 18,778.4 hectares (46,402 acres). Of its total, 9,359.15 hectares (23,127.0 acres) or 49.84% is forestland while 9,419.25 hectares (23,275.5 acres) are classified as alienable and disposable.

Almost half of the area is rugged and mountainous, with hills and plains dotted with marshy land, rocky jutting cliffs and crags.

The town is bounded on the east and south by the Pacific Ocean and Bato town, on the north by high and green mountain ranges of San Miguel, and on the west by the gently rolling hills of San Andres.

=== Climate ===
Climate data for Virac (1991–2020, extremes 1908–2023)
Month	Jan	Feb	Mar	Apr	May	Jun	Jul	Aug	Sep	Oct	Nov	Dec	Year
Record high °C (°F)	34.3 (93.7)	36.6 (97.9)	35.2 (95.4)	35.1 (95.2)	37.2 (99.0)	37.2 (99.0)	36.6 (97.9)	37.8 (100.0)	36.8 (98.2)	36.0 (96.8)	35.0 (95.0)	34.4 (93.9)	37.8 (100.0)
Mean daily maximum °C (°F)	29.0 (84.2)	29.4 (84.9)	30.2 (86.4)	31.2 (88.2)	32.1 (89.8)	32.1 (89.8)	31.6 (88.9)	32.0 (89.6)	31.9 (89.4)	31.0 (87.8)	30.4 (86.7)	29.6 (85.3)	30.9 (87.6)
Daily mean °C (°F)	25.7 (78.3)	25.9 (78.6)	26.4 (79.5)	27.3 (81.1)	28.2 (82.8)	28.4 (83.1)	28.0 (82.4)	28.2 (82.8)	28.1 (82.6)	27.4 (81.3)	27.1 (80.8)	26.4 (79.5)	27.3 (81.1)
Mean daily minimum °C (°F)	22.4 (72.3)	22.4 (72.3)	22.7 (72.9)	23.3 (73.9)	24.4 (75.9)	24.7 (76.5)	24.4 (75.9)	24.5 (76.1)	24.2 (75.6)	23.9 (75.0)	23.7 (74.7)	23.3 (73.9)	23.7 (74.7)
Record low °C (°F)	16.7 (62.1)	15.6 (60.1)	16.9 (62.4)	18.3 (64.9)	19.3 (66.7)	18.4 (65.1)	18.6 (65.5)	19.0 (66.2)	18.0 (64.4)	18.9 (66.0)	18.0 (64.4)	17.2 (63.0)	15.6 (60.1)
Average rainfall mm (inches)	273.5 (10.77)	171.7 (6.76)	177.2 (6.98)	140.5 (5.53)	165.8 (6.53)	220.0 (8.66)	248.4 (9.78)	185.6 (7.31)	264.0 (10.39)	398.5 (15.69)	418.1 (16.46)	524.9 (20.67)	3,188.2 (125.52)
Average rainy days (≥ 1 mm)	15	12	13	12	11	14	16	12	14	19	21	21	180
Average relative humidity (%)	85	85	85	85	85	86	87	86	87	88	88	88	86
Source: PAGASA

Virac has a Type II climate. It has no dry season and an average precipitation of between 2,500 and 3,000 millimetres (98 and 118 in) annually.

Virac's position in the middle of the typhoon belt means that it is heavily affected by typhoons from July to October. The region's dependence on agriculture means that economic development has always been hampered by these weather disturbances.

=== Barangays ===
Virac is politically subdivided into 63 barangays. Each barangay consists of puroks and some have sitios.

The growth of Virac in terms of governance peaked in 1972. From the original 34 barangays in 1960, Virac established 29 new communities to increase the number of barangays to the present 63 barangays.

- Antipolo del Norte
- Antipolo del Sur
- Balite
- Batag
- Bigaa
- Buenavista
- Buyo
- Cabihian
- Calabnigan
- Calampong
- Calatagan Proper
- Calatagan Tibang
- Capilihan
- Casoocan
- Cavinitan
- Gogon Sirangan
- Concepcion (Poblacion)
- Constantino (Poblacion)
- Danicop
- Dugui San Vicente
- Dugui San Isidro
- Dugui Too
- F. Tacorda Village
- Francia (Poblacion)
- Gogon Centro
- Hawan Grande
- Hawan Ilaya
- Hicming
- Igang
- Juan M. Alberto (Poniton)
- Lanao (Poblacion)
- Magnesia del Norte
- Magnesia del Sur
- Marcelo Alberto (Poblacion)
- Marilima
- Pajo Baguio
- Pajo San Isidro
- Palnab del Norte
- Palnab del Sur
- Palta Big
- Palta Salvacion
- Palta Small
- Rawis (Poblacion)
- Salvacion
- San Isidro Village
- San Jose (Poblacion)
- San Juan (Poblacion)
- San Pablo (Poblacion)
- San Pedro (Poblacion)
- San Roque (Poblacion)
- San Vicente
- Ibong Sapa (San Vicente Sur)
- Santa Cruz (Poblacion)
- Santa Elena (Poblacion)
- Santo Cristo
- Santo Domingo
- Santo Niño
- Simamla
- Sogod-Simamla
- Talisoy
- Sogod-Tibgao
- Tubaon
- Valencia

== Demographics ==
Municipal hall of Virac

Population census of Virac

Year	Pop.	±% p.a.
1903	8,945	—
1918	13,486	+2.77%
1939	19,279	+1.72%
1948	22,503	+1.73%
1960	34,417	+3.60%
1970	35,571	+0.33%
1975	38,782	+1.75%
1980	40,102	+0.67%

Year	Pop.	±% p.a.
1990	45,523	+1.28%
1995	49,912	+1.74%
2000	57,067	+2.91%
2007	64,554	+1.71%
2010	66,951	+1.34%
2015	73,650	+1.83%
2020	76,520	+0.81%
2024	75,135	−0.44%

Source: Philippine Statistics Authority

In the 2024 census, the population of Virac was 75,135 people, with a density of 490 inhabitants per square kilometre or 1,300 inhabitants per square mile.

=== Religion ===
Virac Cathedral

Catholicism is a deeply rooted institution in this town with 98% of the people embracing the faith. Virac is the seat of an independent diocese with Bishop Luisito Audal Occiano, D.D., at the helm. The town was once a vicarship of the Archdiocese of Caceres and later, the Diocese of Legazpi. The patron of the town is the Immaculate Concepcion with the feast day celebrated on December 8.

== Economy ==
Poverty incidence of Virac

Source: Philippine Statistics Authority

The economy of Virac is sustained primarily by agriculture - the farming of rice, corn, bananas and root crops. The production of copra and abaca also provide additional income for the people. Its annual income in 1979 was a little more than ₱980,000.00 and the projected income for 1990 is more than a million pesos. Fishing is also an essential industry, together with mining and lumber. Lately, some home industries have been established while other sources of income are business and employment from the government and private sectors.

This capital town has a total land area of 0.30 hectares devoted to industrial undertakings with the exception of the unused 11.2 hectares in Palnab classified as industrial area in the 1978 Official Land Use Plan and the 20-hectare declared site of the proposed Provincial Agro-Industrial Center at Casoocan. Manufacturing and processing activities are dominated by micro-industry enterprises. Of the existing industries, furniture making, being primarily wood-based, faces the gravest threat of extinction due to global concern for forest protection and conservation.

Rice is the single biggest monocrop culture planted in an aggregate area of 1,019 hectares, which is about thirty three percent of the total lowland agricultural land area. Three hundred seventy five hectares are devoted to vegetables production. Upland farms are essentially utilized for cash crops such as abaca, tubers and coconut. Vegetables and other food crops are raised in the low lands on mostly seasonal basis.

For 2011, annual harvests approximate 7,849 MT of palay, 3.00 MT of vegetables, 59.75 MT of corn, 7.98 MT of root crops, 1.6 MT of legumes and other perennial crops 5.445MT. Unprocessed abaca fiber and copra represent the major export products.

In 2012, Virac's locally generated income reached ₱32.6 million, with total income (including IRA) at ₱117.9 million.

The five major income sources:

- Services
- Agriculture
- Tourism
- Cottage Industry
- Manufacturing

== Transportation ==
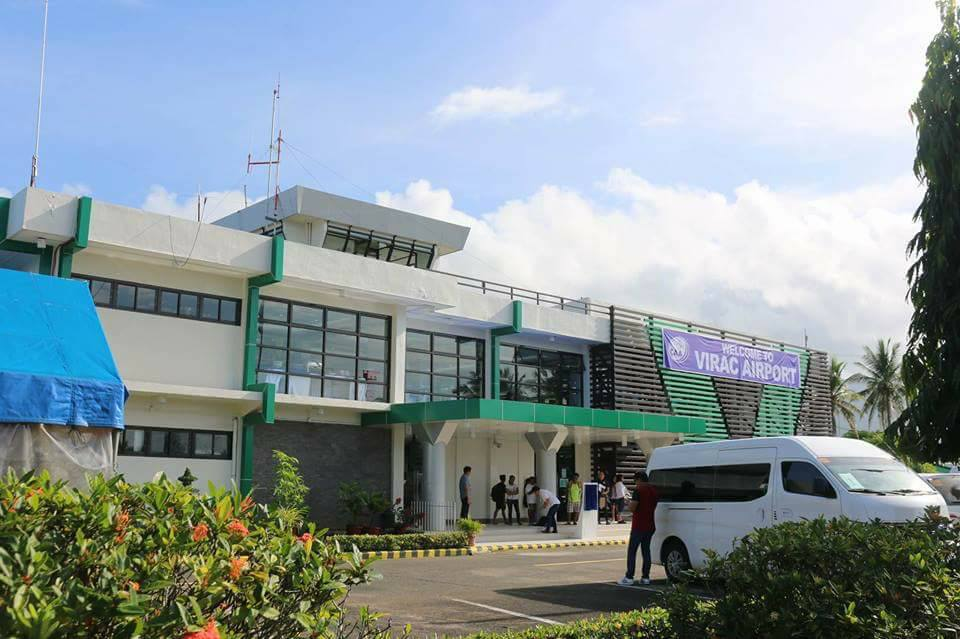
Virac Airport

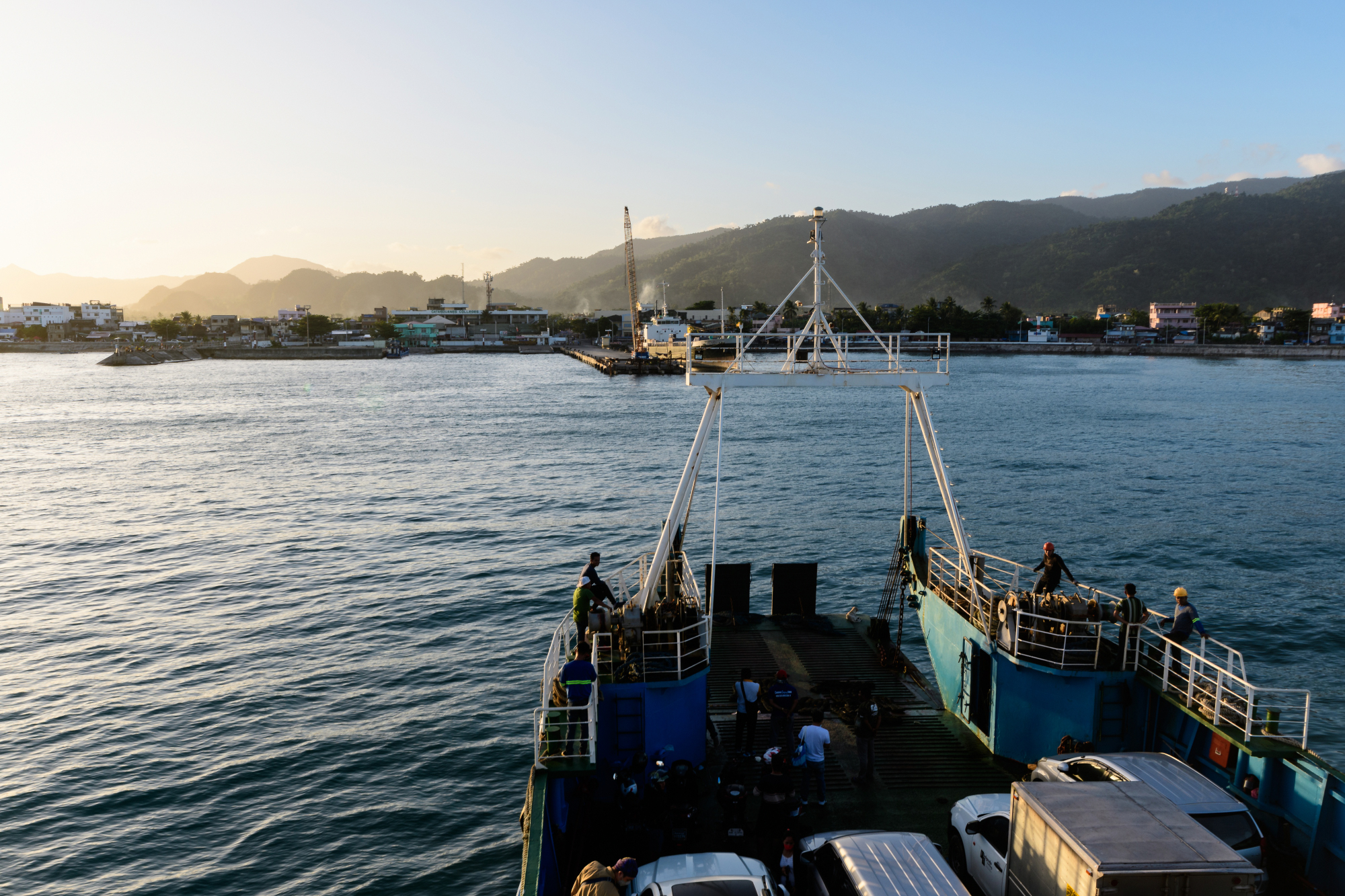
Port of Virac

Virac is served by the Virac Airport. The town also has a seaport, with daily ferry trips from Tabaco City, Albay. Provincial buses coming from Metro Manila often board ferries bound for Catanduanes, either going directly to Virac or passing through neighboring San Andres.

== Education ==
There are two schools district offices which govern all educational institutions within the municipality. They oversee the management and operations of all private and public, from primary to secondary schools. These are the:

- Virac North Schools District
- Virac South Schools District

=== Primary and elementary schools ===
- Antipolo Elementary School
- Balite Elementary School
- Batag Elementary School
- Bigaa Elementary School
- Buenavista Elementary School
- Calabnigan Elementary School
- Calatagan Elementary School
- Calampong Elementary School
- Capilihan Elementary School
- Casoocan Elementary School
- Cavinitan Elementary School
- Danicop Elementary School
- Dr. Guillermo A. Reyes Adventist School
- Dugui San Isidro Elementary School
- Dugui Too Elementary School
- Dugui Wala Elementary School
- F. Tacorda Village Elementary School
- Gogon Elementary School
- Hawan Elementary School
- Hawan Ilaya Elementary School
- Hicming Elementary School
- Igang Elementary School
- Immaculate Concepcion Seminary Academy
- JMA Puniton Elementary School
- Juan M. Alberto Memorial Elementary School
- Magnesia Elementary School
- Marilima Elementary School
- New Hope Learning Center
- Pajo Baguio Elementary School
- Pajo San Isidro Elementary School
- Palnab Elementary School
- Palta Elementary School
- Palta Saday Elementary School
- Reapers Baptist Learning Center
- Rock School of Achievers
- Simamla Elementary School
- San Isidro Village Elementary School
- San Vicente Elementary School
- Sogod Simamla Elementary School
- St. Mary's Learning Center
- Star Learners School
- Sto. Cristo Elementary School
- Sto. Domingo Elementary School
- Sto. Nino Elementary School
- Talisoy Elementary School
- Taytay Elementary School
- The Blooming Child Developmental School
- Valencia Elementary School
- Ville St John School
- Virac Central Elementary School
- Virac Kiddie Smart Learning Center
- Virac Pilot Elementary School

=== Secondary schools ===
- Antipolo National High School
- Buyo Integrated School
- Calatagan High School
- Catanduanes Colleges
- Catanduanes State University Laboratory Schools
- Catanduanes National High School
- Christian Polytechnic Institute
- Christian Polytechnic Institute of Catanduanes International Academy
- Hawan National High School
- Magnesia National High School
- Palta National High School

=== Higher educational institutions ===
- Catanduanes Colleges
- Catanduanes State University
