= Diocese of Virac =

Latin Catholic diocese in the Philippines

Diocese of Virac Dioecesis Viracensis Diyosesis ng Virac

Catholic
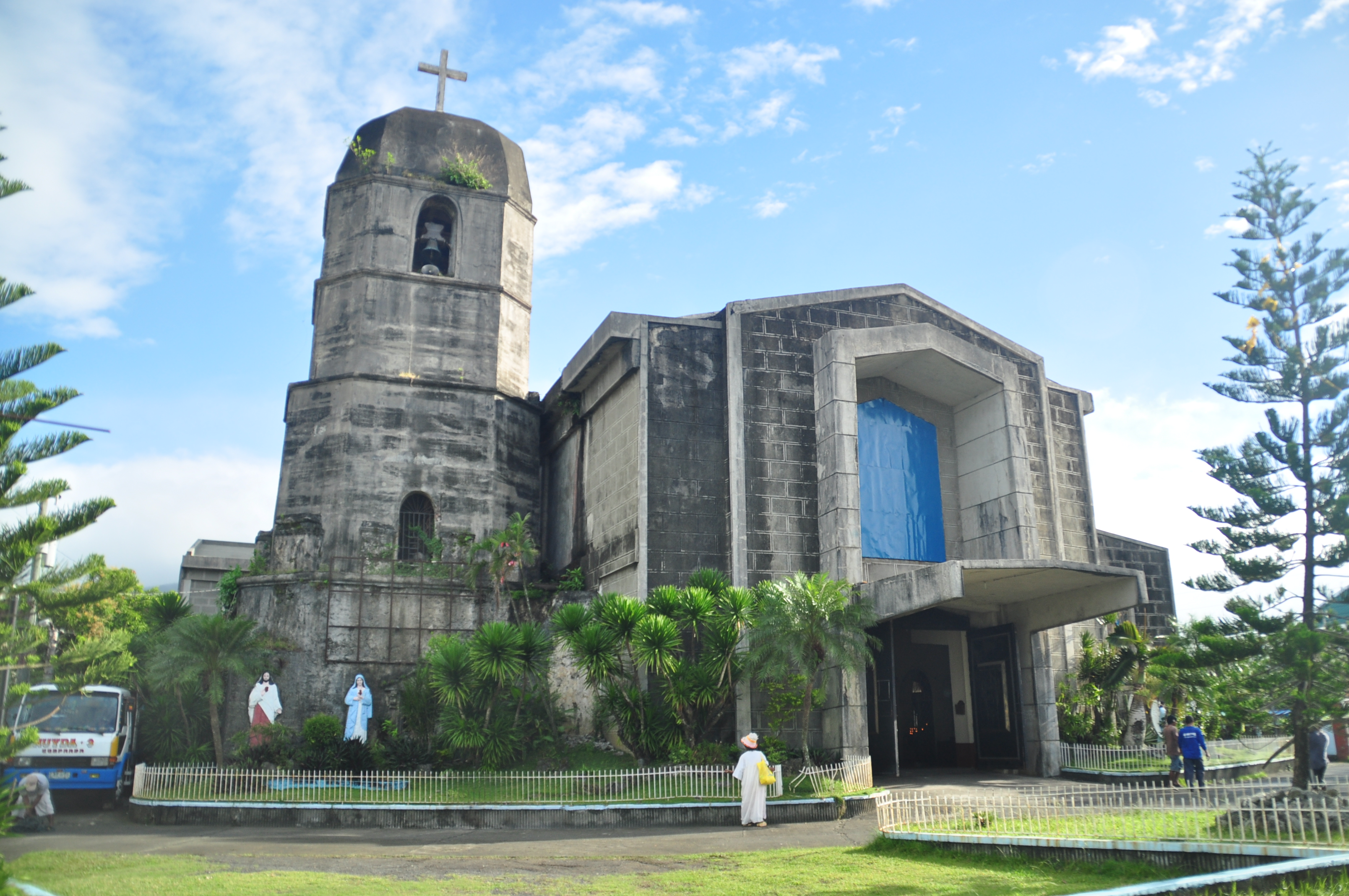
- Virac Cathedral

- Coat of arms

Location
- Country: Philippines
- Territory: Catanduanes
- Ecclesiastical province: Caceres
- Metropolitan: Caceres
- Headquarters: Virac, Catanduanes
- Coordinates: 13°34′45″N 124°13′50″E

Statistics
- Area: 1,511 km^{2} (583 sq mi)
- Population: Total; Catholics: (as of 2021); 277,350; 263,483 (95%)
- Parishes: 50

Information
- Denomination: Catholic Church
- Sui iuris church: Latin Church
- Rite: Roman Rite
- Established: May 27, 1974
- Cathedral: Cathedral of the Immaculate Conception
- Patron saints: Immaculate Conception of the Blessed Virgin Mary; St. Joseph, Patron of the Universal Church
- Language: Bicol

Current leadership
- Pope: Leo XIV
- Bishop: Luisito Occiano
- Metropolitan Archbishop: Rex Andrew Clement Alarcon
- Vicar General: Msgr. Joseph Clarian Gregorio Clarianes
- Episcopal Vicars: Msgr. Constantino Timajo Soriao Msgr. Laudemer Jose Ala Gapaz
- Bishops emeritus: Manolo Alarcon de los Santos

Map
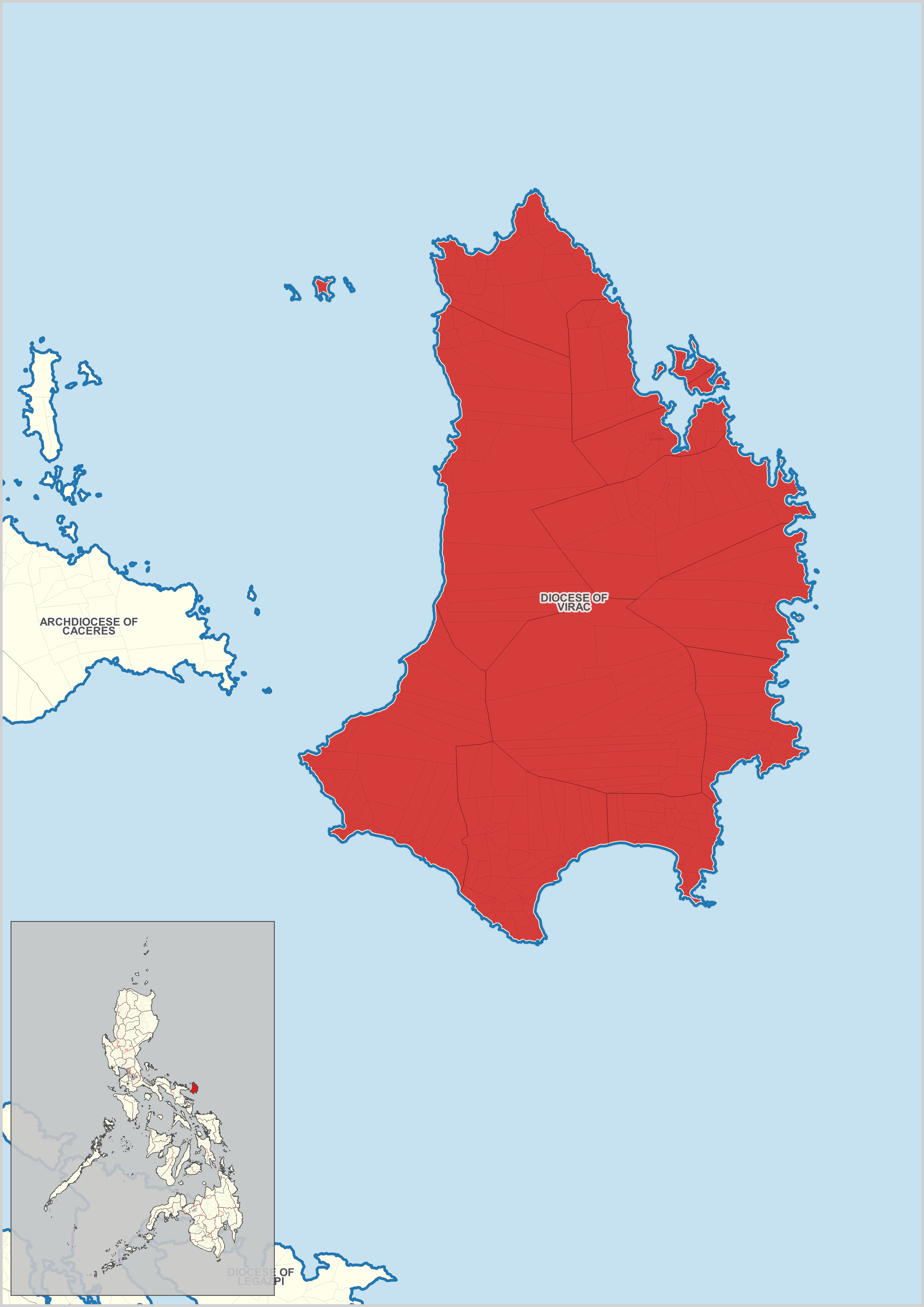
- Territorial jurisdiction of the Diocese of Virac

The Diocese of Virac (Lat: Dioecesis Viracensis) is a diocese of the Latin Church of the Catholic Church in the Philippines. The Diocese of Virac, Catanduanes was established in 1974, from territory in the Diocese of Legazpi and the diocese is a suffragan of the Archdiocese of Caceres.

The diocese is led by Bishop Luisito Audal Occiano who succeeds Bishop Manolo de los Santos.

== History ==
The Diocese of Virac in the islands of Catanduanes was canonically established on August 27, 1974 with Jose Crisologo Sorra, from Virac, as the first bishop. At the start, there were 16 parishes (11 town parishes and 5 barrio parishes) and around 25 priests in the active ministry assigned in the different parishes, diocesan commissions and offices, and in the seminary.

=== Minor Seminary and Pre-College Seminary ===
The Immaculate Conception Minor Seminary, located at the Fiat Compound in Cavinitan, was opened in 1975. The first batch of first year high school seminarians stayed at a dormitory located at the Immaculate Conception Seminary Academy (formerly Immaculate Conception Academy) in downtown Virac, where they also went for their academic studies. In the school year 1975-76, these seminarians were transferred to the Nazareth Homes (west wing) until the seminary was ready to house them. They used the present study hall as their dormitory while the seminary dorm was on its final finishing. The seminary dormitory was finished and used in the school year 1978-1979.

The Minor Seminary attracted many young boys, and many parents, and served as a seedbed for young vocations to the priesthood until the year 1984 when, together with the Immaculate Conception Seminary Academy (ICSA), it had to close due to financial constraints. The closure the Minor Seminary and ICSA was a great loss indeed.

In June 1986, the seminary reopened as a Pre-College Seminary. Those who wish to enter the College Seminary (Philosophy) undergo a one-year training formation at the Pre-College Seminary. This has become an alternative to the Minor Seminary and instead of spending four years of high school studies in the seminary before proceeding to College Seminary, one can opt to study high school outside the seminary and then enter the Pre-College Seminary for one year before proceeding to the College Seminary.

In school year 2005-2006, the diocese opened a Minor Seminary again, together with the revival of the Immaculate Conception Seminary Academy (ICSA), the former Immaculate Conception Academy (ICA), now called Immaculate Conception Academy Students and Alumni School (ICASAS), occupying the Stella Maris building and compound, in Concepcion, downtown Virac. The revived ICA/ICSA is now under the administration of ICA/ICSA Alumni, with the blessing of the Bishop of Virac. The first batch of first year high school seminarians go to this school for their academic training.

=== Bishop's Palace and other buildings at the Fiat Compound ===
The Bishop's Palace was built adjacent to the seminary. The Nazareth Homes, located at the back of the seminary, were originally constructed as quarters for priests which they could use during their monthly clergy meetings, diocesan affairs, and every time they come to Virac. The Nazareth Homes also served as sleeping quarters for retreatants, Marriage Encounterers, Youth Encounterers and visitors. To facilitate retreats, recollections and meetings, an Octagon Hall was constructed between the seminary and Nazareth Homes.

Other buildings followed. Beside the seminary, the Fiat Printing Press. And at the back of the Nazareth Homes, the Rattan Shop. These two establishments catered to the out-of-school youth who were employed at the Press and the Rattan Shop. The Rattan Shop closed in 1993. The Fiat Press continues to function until today.

=== Episcopate ===
Jose Sorra, first Bishop of Virac, served the diocese until 1993 when he was transferred to the Diocese of Legaspi. The diocese was vacant [sede vacante] for almost a year until September 12, 1994 when a new Bishop of Virac was installed: Manolo Alarcon de los Santos, from the Archdiocese of Caceres.

De los Santos, who has served the diocese since 1994, tendered his resignation at the age of 76, following the Catholic canon law that sets the retirement age for a diocesan bishop at 75. His resignation was accepted by Pope Francis, marking the end of an era and the beginning of a new one. In the wake of the retirement of de los Santos, Luisito Occiano, a priest from the Archdiocese of Caceres, has been appointed as the new bishop of Virac. Occiano, who is also the director of the Caceres Commission on Communication, was named the bishop-elect by Pope Francis. Born on June 21, 1971, Occiano completed his philosophy and theology studies at the Holy Rosary Major Seminary in Naga. Occiano was installed on June 26, 2024 – 5 days after his episcopal ordination at the Peñafrancia Basilica on June 21, 2024 by Rolando Tirona with Archbishop Charles John Brown and Archbishop Adolfo Tito Yllana as co-consecrators.

=== Official diocesan seal ===
The seal of the Diocese of Virac consists of a blue field upon which are imposed a red dove carrying on its beak a rose white, and hovering over as if fertilizing, a six-pointed white star flower being tossed by the mighty waves of the Pacific Ocean. At the left side is a figure of the Mayon Volcano; at the right is an island where a wooden cross stands prominent.

The red dove stands for the Holy Spirit, while the white rose at its beak symbolizes the Blessed Virgin Mary, principal patroness of the diocese under the title "Immaculate Conception".

The six-pointed white star flower being fertilized by the dove stands for "Virac", which, according to one legend, comes from the Bikol "burak", meaning "flower". The mighty waves speak of the geographical proximity of the Diocese of Virac to the Pacific Ocean.

The Mayon Volcano stands for the Mother-Diocese of Legazpi, while the island on far right is the province of Catanduanes, with the wooden cross symbolizing the Holy Cross of Batalay - the very first Christian symbol to be planted in the island in the 16th century.

The official name and date of establishment are written in Latin at the outer sides of the seal; while a red miter inscribed with the Greek chi-rho, caps the seal as a fitting symbol of its canonical status as a full-fledged diocese.

== First Diocesan Synod ==
At the silver jubilee of the Diocese of Virac, Bishop de los Santos convoked the First Diocesan Synod from August 28 to September 8, 1999. The diocese used the synod to assess and evaluate what had become of it after 25 years, setting a new direction and vision.

The synod launched and implemented the diocesan thrust called the New Evangelization Pastorale (NEP), authored by tJose Borja Molina, moderator curiae, finance administrator, vicar general, and parish priest of the Cathedral Parish of Our Lady of the Immaculate Conception, Virac. During the synod, he presented the Main Working Paper on Christian Life titled: "Renewing the Christian Life: Agenda for the Third Millennium". As the main document of the synod, it has been adopted as the Principle of the Diocesan Pastoral Plan.

The NEP would be the center of the Diocesan Pastoral Plan intended to give a common goal and direction to all pastoral activities in the entire diocese as expressed in the Diocesan Vision made during the synod. As a diocesan thrust, the NEP would be implemented in all parishes and mission churches in the diocese.

== First Diocesan Pastoral Assembly ==
Five years after the First Diocesan Synod, on August 24–27, 2004 de los Santos called for a Diocesan Pastoral Assembly to see and evaluate the pastoral work of the Local Church and address some relevant issues affecting the Church, in line with the diocesan vision and the diocesan thrust of the New Evangelization Pastorale. The Pastoral Assembly emphasized the urgent implementation of the NEP in all parishes and mission churches, and the immediate creation of the Diocesan Pastoral Plan. In that pastoral assembly, the major diocesan commissions at work presented their statutes, locating and aligning all their existing and future programs and activities with the stages, principles and structures of the NEP.

== Diocesan Pastoral Plan ==
Since the First Diocesan Synod, the Diocesan Pastoral Council (DPC) was created to draft the Diocesan Pastoral Plan. Hence, various discussions, consultations and deliberations had been done in the parish, vicarial, diocesan, and commission levels under the supervision of the DPC. The diocese became ready to launch and implement the 2005 Diocesan Pastoral Plan of the Diocese of Virac.

== Parishes and mission churches ==
As of 26 September 2026, the Diocese of Virac has a total of 50 parishes and mission churches.

Name of Parish/Mission Church	Location	Date of Establishment	Current Parish Priest/ Priest in-charge
Saint John the Baptist Parish	Caramoran, Catanduanes	1600	Avelino O. Sualibio Jr.
Saint Ignatius of Loyola Parish	Pandan, Catanduanes	1650	Nestor Buena
Our Lady of Assumption Parish	Viga, Catanduanes	1661	Felix Mira
Saint James the Greater Parish	Panganiban (Payo), Catanduanes	1683	Hector Del Rosario
Immaculate Conception Cathedral-Parish	Virac, Catanduanes	1755	Allan Martin Basilio
Saint Andrew the Apostle Parish	San Andres, Catanduanes	1798	Joseph A. Dela Providencia
Saint Joseph the Worker Parish	Oco, Viga, Catanduanes	1811	Randulfo de Quiroz
Saint John the Baptist Parish	Bato, Catanduanes	1830	Paul Isorena
Saint Lawrence, Deacon and Martyr Parish	Baras, Catanduanes	1896	Joseph Saratan
Saint Anthony of Padua Parish	Cabugao, Bato, Catanduanes	1911	Salvador Rojas JR.
Saint Anthony of Padua Parish	Bagamanoc, Catanduanes	1929	John Gerard G. Aldave
Saint Isidore the Farmer Parish	Gigmoto, Catanduanes	1951	Jesus Guinging
Our Lady of Mount Carmel Parish	Tambogñon, Viga, Catanduanes	1952	Mark Anthony Tasarra
Saint Michael the Archangel Parish	San Miguel, Catanduanes	1952	Raul Delos Santos
Saint Isidore the Farmer Parish	Manambrag, San Andres, Catanduanes	1953	Reynaldo Pabillian
Our Lady of Salvation Parish	Palta, Virac, Catanduanes	1955	Constantino Soriao
Saint Isidore the Farmer Parish	Magnesia, Virac, Catanduanes	1956	John E. del Valle
San Francisco Carraciolo Parish	Tabugoc, Pandan, Catanduanes	2002	Christian Soriao
Most Holy Trinity Parish	Datag, Caramoran, Catanduanes	2005	Efraim Tariman
Saint John Mary Vianney Parish	Hitoma, Caramoran, Catanduanes	2010	Ernie Tatualla
Pope Saint John Paul II Parish	Agban, Baras, Catanduanes	2014	Joey Tendenilla
Mary, Mother of the Church Parish	Antipolo, Virac, Catanduanes	2015	Sid Jose T. Sanchez
Pope Saint John XXIII Parish	Bugao, Bagamanoc, Catanduanes	2015	Karl Anthony M. Padilla
San Lorenzo Ruiz de Manila Parish	Tubli, Caramoran, Catanduanes	2016	Anthony Ogena
Santa Maria Josefa del Corazon de Jesus Parish	Buyo, Virac, Catanduanes	2016	Raymond Francis Aldave
Saints Louis and Zelie Martin Parish	Mabato, San Miguel, Catanduanes	2016	Arnel Barba
Pope Saint Pius X Parish	Bagong Sirang, San Andres, Catanduanes	2017	Rhodel Abad, OFM
Our Lady of Sorrows Parish and Diocesan Shrine of the Holy Cross	Batalay, Bato, Catanduanes	2020	William Peter Arlegi, O.S.A
Saint Josemaria Escriva Parish	Obo, San Miguel, Catanduanes	2021	Jason C. Macuja
Santa Maria Faustina Kowalska Parish	Bagumbayan, Bato, Catanduanes	2021	Roberto E. Sanchez
Mary, Star of the Sea Parish	Alinawan, Panganiban (Payo), Catanduanes	2021	Efraim M. Tariman
Saint Alfonso Maria Fusco Parish	Lictin, San Andres, Catanduanes	2022	Laudemer Jose A. Gapaz
Saint Padre Pio de Piertrelcina Parish	Mayngaway, San Andres, Catanduanes	2022	Orlando R. Mendoza Jr.
Saint Joseph, Protector of Families Parish	Tilod, Baras, Catanduanes	2023	Rolly D. Rabaca
Saint Pedro Calungsod Parish	Sicmil, Gigmoto, Catanduanes	2023	Laurente O. Dio
Saint Therese of the Child Jesus Mission Church	Pagsanghan, San Miguel, Catanduanes	2018	Raymund T. Teodones
Mary, Health of the Sick Mission Church	Ogbong, Viga, Catanduanes	2020	Mark Angelo Arcilla
Our Lady of the Holy Rosary Mission Church	Cobo, Pandan, Catanduanes	2020	Rico Subion Jr.
Mary, Queen of the Family Mission Church	Hawan Grande, Virac, Catanduanes	2021	Felbert V. Reyes
Mary, Undoer of Knots Mission Church	Oguis, Bato, Catanduanes	2022	Stephen Polo
Mary, Mother of the Good Counsel Mission Church	Tariwara, Pandan, Catanduanes	2022	Joel Teves
Mary, Mother of Divine Love Mission Church	Progresso, San Miguel, Catanduanes	2022	Danilo C. Belaro
Nuestra Señora de la Santisima Trinidad Mission Church	Suchan, Bagamanoc (Panay Island), Catanduanes	2023	Oliver D. Estor, S.O.L.T.
Saint Paul VI Mission Church	Paniquihan, Baras, Catanduanes	2023	Garry Q. Uchi
Mary, Queen of Angels Parish	Bigaa, Virac, Catanduanes	2023	Raymund Fajardo
Mary, the Queen Parish	Calatagan, Virac, Catanduanes	2024	Joseph Clarian Clarianes
Our Lady of Penafrancia Mission Church	Tinago, Viga, Catanduanes	2023	Jambo Valatero

== Ordinaries ==
Bishop		Period in Office	Coat of Arms
1.	José Crisologo Sorra	(27 May 1974 – 1 Mar 1993, appointed Bishop of Legazpi)	
2.	Manolo de los Santos	(12 August 1994 – 29 February 2024)	
3.	Luisito A. Occiano (2 years, 235 days)	(29 February 2024 – Present)	

== See also ==
- Catholic Church in the Philippines
