= Bato, Catanduanes =

Municipality in Catanduanes, Philippines

Bato
- Municipality
- Municipality of Bato
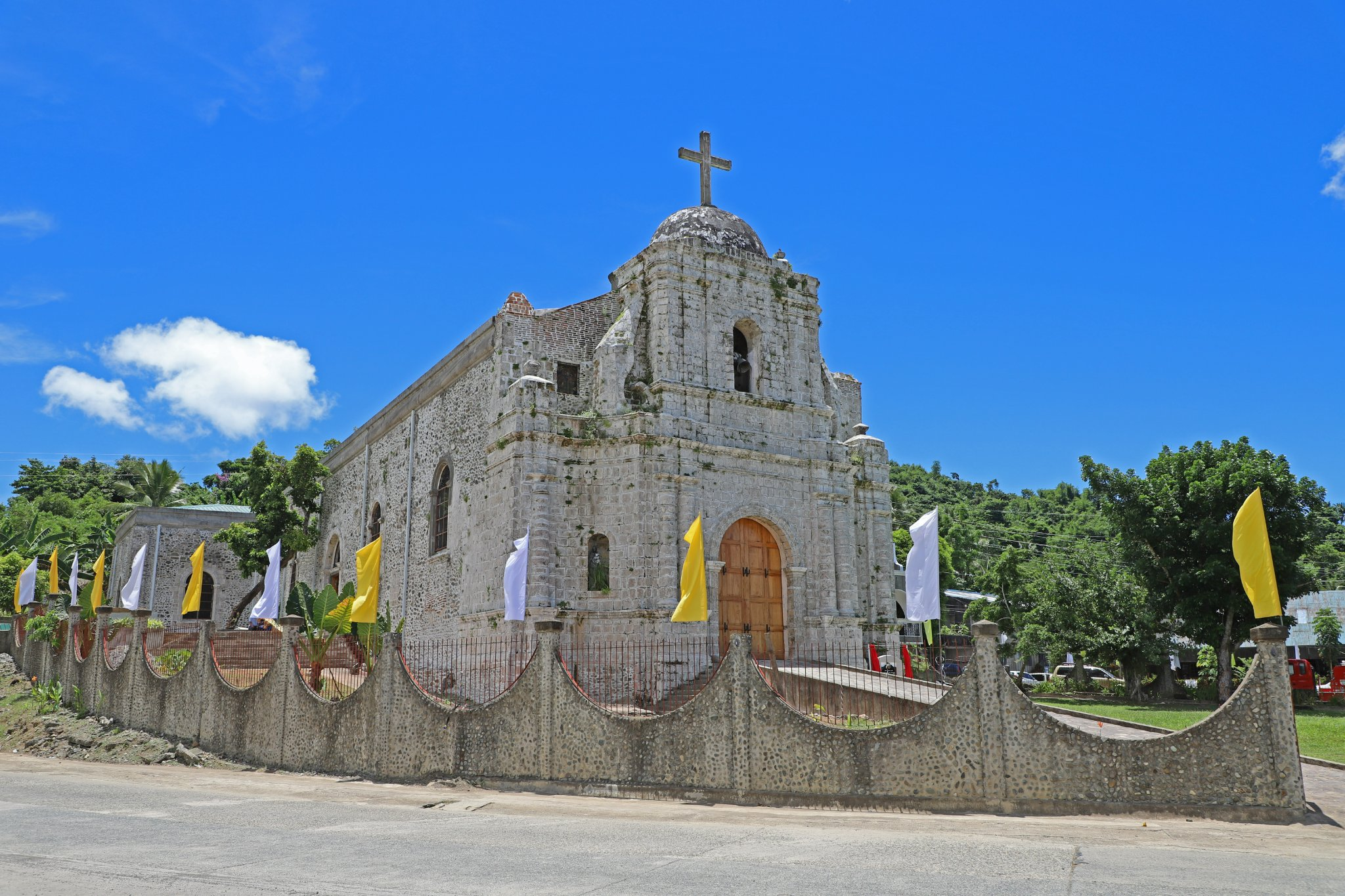
- Bato Church

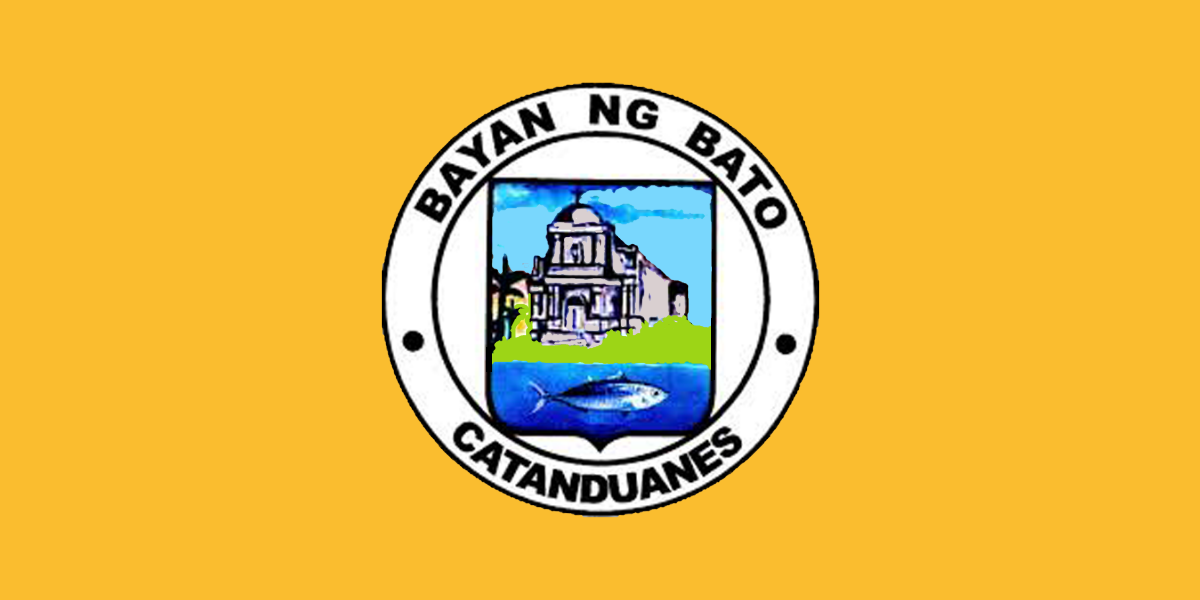
- Flag

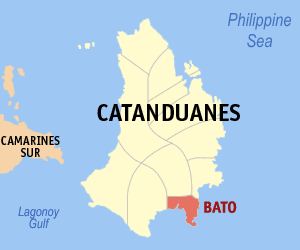
- Map of Catanduanes with Bato highlighted
- Interactive map of Bato
- Location within the Philippines
- Coordinates: 13°36′N 124°18′E
- Country: Philippines
- Region: Bicol Region
- Province: Catanduanes
- District: Lone district
- Founded: 1799
- Barangays: 27 (see Barangays)

Government
  - Type: Sangguniang Bayan
  - Mayor: Juan T. Rodulfo
  - Vice Mayor: Atoy Teston
  - Representative: Eulogio R. Rodriguez
  - Municipal Council: Members: Joevic Bernal; Dennis Timbal; Adoy Toledana; Janice Teope; Renz Tanael; Khominie Rodulfo; Ely Tasarra; Dennis Pereyra
  - Electorate: 16,828 voters (2025)

Area
  - Total: 48.62 km^{2} (18.77 sq mi)
- Elevation: 156 m (512 ft)
- Highest elevation: 722 m (2,369 ft)
- Lowest elevation: 0 m (0 ft)

Population (2024 census)
  - Total: 21,325
  - Density: 438.6/km^{2} (1,136/sq mi)
  - Households: 5,044

Economy
  - Income class: 4th municipal income class
  - Poverty incidence: 21.44% (2023)
  - Revenue: ₱ 121.2 million (2024)
  - Assets: ₱ 295.9 million (2024)
  - Expenditure: ₱ 104.3 million (2024)
  - Liabilities: ₱ 30.13 million (2024)

Service provider
  - Electricity: First Catanduanes Electric Cooperative (FICELCO)
- Time zone: UTC+8 (PST)
- ZIP code: 4801
- PSGC: 0502003000
- IDD : area code: +63 (0)52
- Native languages: Bicol
- Website: www.bato-catanduanes.gov.ph

Bato, officially the Municipality of Bato, is a municipality in the province of Catanduanes, Philippines. According to the 2024 census, it has a population of 21,325 people.

== Etymology ==
before the coming of the Spaniards the town proper or the poblacion of Bato was still thick forest and was inhabited by several pagan and primitive families. There were only a few houses and they were far apart. These primitive people lived on the games of the forest and on the products of the small kaIngins they had. There ways of life were crude. They used bows and arrows and spears to catch the wild animals of the forest and pointed or sharp sticks of wood or bamboo to till the soil. They were hostile and warlike. They did not like to live in groups for they wanted to be free from the associations of people in order to free themselves from enemies. They lived independently without depending on others for their daily needs. When the Spaniards came to the Philippines the island of Catanduanes was one of their objects of conquest. Bato proper at that time was populated by a few hundreds of people. When the natives heard of the sad and hateful coming of the Americans they thought of fighting. All the strong men prepared long spears, arrows fit their bows, and sharpened their bolos and got ready for the fight. The Spaniards on the other hand had shotguns and long sabers and powder. They had better arms than the natives. Shen the Spaniards went to conquer the place, they fired their shotguns In the place now Sipi. They burned some powder and there were loud explosions. The natives were very frightened. They feared they might all be killed. They decided not to fight but fled to the thick forest for safety. There was no fight. The Spaniards entered the town proper and found no enemy. The houses were left abandoned by the natives.

== History ==
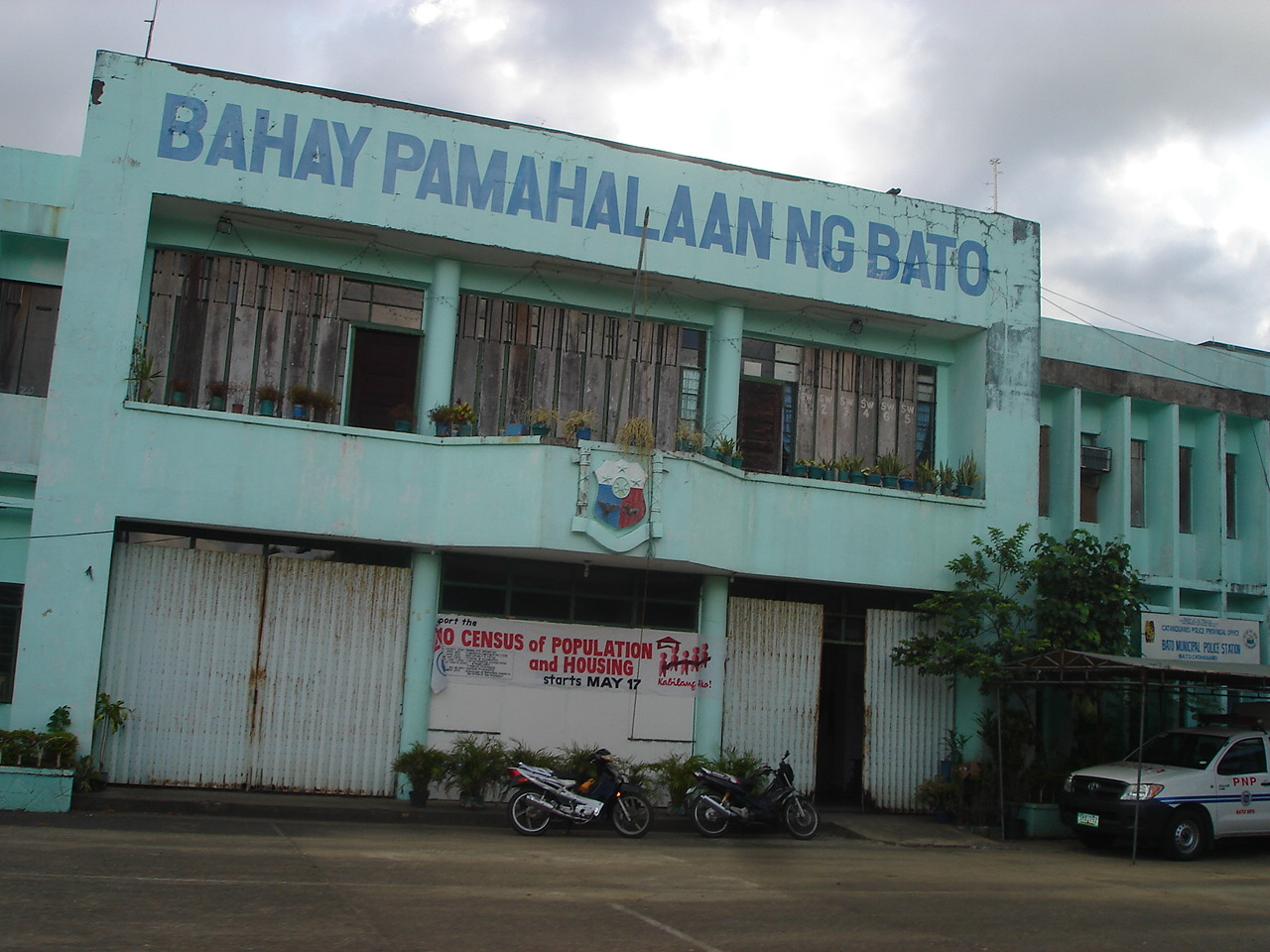
Bato Municipal Hall, 2010.

=== Pre-Colonial Era ===
Little is known about the existence of Bato in the early part of the 13th century. It is believed however, that on the basis of language peculiarities spoken by the natives, the early settlers were Muslim traders from Surigao. Traders who were previously immigrants from Borneo and Malaya. They settled near the shore of Batalay for protection against external threats, and for communal needs, people lived together in groups with elected leaders. Some of these groups retreated from the shores and settled near the Bato River.

=== Story of the Cross of Batalay ===
When the Spaniards came to colonize the .Philippines, one of their ships sailed to the Bicol Region. While the ship was in the Pacific Ocean, a great storm arose and the ship was dashed to pieces. Some of the passengers of the boat were drowned and a few survived, They were dashed to the shores of the present barrio of Batalay, One of those who survived was a Catholic Bishop by the name of Monsigneur Herrera, By that time, this barrio was a flourishing town under a datu who was Padilla whose name was Padilla. When same fishermen went to the shore one day, they saw the Spaniards, including the Bishop, almost dying and still tied to pieces of board from the wrecked Spanish ship. The fishermen were surprised to see the white men for they had not seen white men Before. They brought the Spaniards to the Chief. They were received by Padilia but they became his subjects. They related to the people the whole story about how they came to the shores of Batalay,

Everything went on smoothly. The bishop and his companions worked with the people of Padilla to live. During that time, there was a custom that when mothers were to deliver, they were taken to a small barrio north of the town found along the river now called Musbos", The abdomen of these women were cut open to get the child. This was how the name ’’musbos” was given which means cutting open. Since the people were ignorant about surgery, few mothers survived, only these who could suffer the pain of the Operation did not die. The bishop and the Spaniards heard about this. They told the people that mothers should not be operated that way but instead the mothers should just wait for the time the child will be born. The bishop offered a help to the expectant mothers. He said that he knew how to help a delivering mother. The people then asked his help. He was successful at his few first patients The people were convinced. They then, were happy because there was no more danger of death for the expectant mothers. Then came the turn of the chief's daughter. The bishop then was called, Unfortunately it was a difficult delivery. The mother and child died. The chief became very mad and sad at the mishap. He became angry with the bishop. He ordered the bishop to pay him for the sad fate of his daughter and her child. He was made to pound rice the whole day for several days. He was made to do Herd work for the chief. He was given little food and little water to drink. The bishop did not resist the hand work and he became thin and weak. He was then ordered to dig a hole in the ground with crude tools. When the hole was about six feet deep, the chief ordered his people to bury the bishop alive in the hole which he has dug. The Spaniards were alarmed at the sad fate of the bishop. They became afraid. They might be the next victims of sad fate. They fled and went away. The people then relieved in tranquility without the Spaniards. Not long after that sad even, a calamity came to the people of Batalay. The sea rose high and dashed its strong waves to the land. All of Batalay was in deep water. The water was infested with schools of swordfish which made war upon the drowning people. This kind of fish is called in the vernacular "doqal”. The fish attacked all the people they found. Some people were able to escape. They caught some of the fish and feasted on them. The fish had poison and all the people who ate of the fish died, Where the flourishing town once stood became a swamp. The few people who survived went northward and'made settlements along the banks of the Bato river. It was where the present Poblacion of Bato now stands.

=== Spanish Era ===
When all the corners of the island of Catanduanes were reached by the Spanish soldiers and there were no more traces that the people of the place would wage arms against them they began to establish the government in the place. They placed under a "cabesa de barangay” or barrio lieutenant. The whole island was placed under the "teniente governador" or lieutenant governor. The island was placed under the province of Albay who was headed by a governadorcillo” or a governor. The cabeza de barangay was subjected to the capitan, the capitan to the teniente governador- and the teniente governador to the governadorcillo of Albay. Each organized his own government and has jurisdiction over his followers and subjects. Their organization was under the close supervision of the Spanish soldiers. Some Spanish soldiers held the high positions and the government aet uo was military. The voice of the soldier reigned

People lived under the rule of Spain. The people adopted their mode of living; dressing, learned the Catholic religion and had the benefits of education. The former old church, made of stones, lime and bricks, school building which is near the present church of Bato was once a school house, in the late nineteenth century. The people were contented and happy despite the cruelties of the Spaniards, However, the peace at were at times interrupted by the coming of the Moros who were bandits and who carried away women and children. In order that the town be safe from the enemy, the people planted bamboos around the town which grew thick and strong. No animal or man could pass through the bamboo for they grew close together. There were only three entrances to the town proper, one near the present cemetery of Bato, another near the place where the present school site of Bato is and the third / near the back of the present municipal building of Bato facing the river To guard against the incoming Moros, a watchtower was erected in the seashore of Banyaga. It was a tower for the watchers who served in shifts. A boat was also furnished the watchers. The boat was run by oars. This boat was used to fight the incoming Moro bandirs. They called the watchtower ’’baluwarte” and the boat “pallowa”.'Another tower was built at the top of Banawang Hill, When the guards at the tower in Banawang Hill understood. They too put up signs which are understood by the people of the town. The town then is warned of the enemy. If one wished to become a ”capitan”, or a “mayor” of the town, he must have served in the chasing of the Moros with great bravery and courage for one year. Another tower was built in Cabanglayan. It also was a means of informing of the town of the coming of the Moros. At nights, lights served as signals. In the year 1880, there were only two big stores in town, one was owned by Juan Aznar and his store once stood in the present market place. The other was owned by Miguel Esama and Carlos Llanes, both Spaniards, Their store once stood in the present corner where Andres Tapit now his store

=== Bato during the Revolution ===
There was no great destruction of lives during this war because this town was not a battlefront. During that time the head of the town was a Filipino "Gobernadorcillo". He was called ’’Capitan" for a long time but he only ruled by name. The "Guardia Civil" was the Military Power. They were greatly feared by the people. They could enter any house without permission from its owner. When they felt like having a fiesta, they could go about the town and barrios and took all the chickens and pigs they wanted. However, those were the years when the Philippine Revolution broke out, many soldiers from this place were recruited to serve the Spanish government. When General Emilio Aguinaldo proclaimed the first Philippine Republic, the Spanish soldiers were centralized in Manila. Later on, Filipino soldiers called the "insurgents” came and organized a military government. There was also the "Capitan" but the real powers came from the military officers. The insurgents also took anything they liked from the people. Finally, the Americans came. The Filipinos fled to the forest without knowing the aims of the foreigners. There were some who died in their hiding places because of some contagious diseases. Some died of hunger.

=== American era ===
The first Americans who came to Bato landed at Virac. Some went to Cabugao and lived in the house of Rafael Molina, a businessman, whose house is now in ruins The ruins could still be seen now along the river At the mouth of Gabugao Bay. The people of Bato knew that there were Americans in Virac but no one actually saw one. The rebels planned to fight the Americans man to man. They thought it was easy to kill them with bolos. Two men however, wanted to see the Americans. They were Lucas Rojas and Cayetano Rojas, who was then the chief of police. When they reached Cabatuan, they met the Americans who offered them eats. The two men returned to, Bato and told the people that it was futile to fight the Americans with bolos because they were tall and big and their weapons were guns. The insurgents moved their headquarters to Obo. Cayetano Rojas was suspected of being pro-American. He was then searched and finally he was caught and brought to Obo. while he was a captive of the insurgents, he promised to accompany the soldiers get supplies in Bato, being the chief of police. He was permitted to go with twenty five soldiers. While they were in Tilis Cayetano Rojas fled to the hills of Mintay and Libjo and proceeded to Bote. His companion Lucas also fled for they were both enemies of the Filipinos and Americans

In 1896, a revolutionary government was established in Bato. Municipal officials were inducted to office and there was much merrymaking and a parade. Facundo Teves was chosen the ’’Capitan”. On that day Americans landed in Batalay and proceeded to Bato by foot, others came from Virac by foot. When the Americans were near the town, they fired and fired to frighten the Filipinos. The Filipinos fired only thrice for they had only one gun and a few bullets. Cayetano Rojas and his companion Lucas surrendered to the Americans for they thought that they would be in such a dangerous situation to be enemies of Filipinos and Americans. The Americans then fought with the Filipinos and the Filipinos fled to the northern mountains. That was in 1902. It also was a year when all other islands were ruled by the American sovereignty. The Spaniards, Filipinos and Americans than lived together at peace. The Spanish businessmen continued their trade, so with the other foreigners. The first Chinese merchant of Bato was Jose Lizaso. His store was once in Del Rosario Street where the store of Antonio Que Hang Ko is now located, Domingo Aramburo was another Chinese merchant who opened a store where the present store of Singa is now located. Several other businessmen followed The population increased rapidly. The town was expanded and several streets were added. Salvacion street was the last addition to the town.

The people lived peacefully for more than forty years. Their fields yielded much rice and other crops were abundant. Schools were opened by the Americans and all the children were obliged to enter school at the expense of the government. Roads were built and transportation became easy. Sanitation was improved and the people lived in good health.

=== Japanese Occupation ===
The peace and happiness was disturbed when on December 12, 1941, Japanese troops landed at Batalay. World War II then came to Bato. There were convoy planes that hovered so low that they almost touched the roofs of the houses in Batalay. It was a school day. The Japanese found the teachers in the school house in Batalay. At that time, the school dentist, Dr. Sapin, was in Batalay cleaning the teeth of the school children. The teachers and the dentist fled to town leaving the school children and school building in disorder. The people of the barrio fled to the mountains. The people left the barrio for fear that the place become a battleground. Hearing of the news, the people of the town also left their homes and fled to the hills leaving their houses in disorder and some not even closed. Everybody was in great fright of the Japanese. The people continued to live in the hills and mountains until the Japanese left Batalay for the mainland. There was no battle in Bato for there were no soldiers when the Japanese Military Administration. For four years the island of Catanduanes was governed by the Japanese. The Japanese soldiers ordered the people to render them free labor in the construction of their garrisons in Catamcan and Bababang Bato. 1945 came. The American forces were near. Filipinos organized guerrillas. The guerillas helped the Filipinos in some ways but there waee those who abused the people. When the guerillas had no food, they asked the people to give them carabaos, chickens, rice, etc.

It was in April 1945, in the Philippines when the Commonwealth Government was re-established in the Philippines But still during that period there were still Japanese in the mountains The people then enjoyed once more the benefits of peace.

=== Contemporary Era ===
At early morning on November 1, 2020, Super Typhoon Goni, locally known as Super Typhoon Rolly and the current record holder for the most intense landfalling tropical cyclone in terms of 1-minute maximum sustained winds, made landfall in the municipality and left widespread damage.

=== Past Mayors of Bato ===
CABEZA de BARANGAY (Spanish Era)

1. Capitan Don Mariano (Bantog) Reyes
2. Capitan Don Pablo Rojas
3. Capitan Don Nicolas Guerrero
4. Capitan Don Miguel Triunfante
5. Capitan Don Calixto Torres
6. Capitan Don Juan Rojas
7. Capitan Don Manuel Terrazola
8. Capitan Don Carlos Macapugay
9. Capitan Don Miguel Manlangit

PRESIDENT (American Era)

- 1901 Presidente Pedro Triunfo
- 1901 – 1903 Presidente Nazario Taroy
- 1903 – 1905 Presidente Jose Mendoza
- 1905 – 1907 Presidente Pio Tejada
- 1907 – 1909 Presidente Pedro Chavez
- 1909 – 1911 Presidente Pedro Teves
- 1911 – 1913 Presidente Facundo Teves
- 1913 – 1915 Presidente Vidal Publico
- 1915 – 1917 Presidente Ramon Aguilar
- 1917 – 1919 Presidente Esteban Taroy
- 1919 – 1923 Presidente Severiano Tanteo
- 1923 – 1926 Presidente Teodolo Rojas
- 1926 – 1929 Presidente Esteban Rojas
- 1929 – 1932 Presidente Valentin Torrecampo (Democrata)
- 1932 – 1935 Presidente Felix Reyes (Democrata)
- 1935 – 1938 Presidente Juan E. Rodulfo (Democrata)

MUNICIPAL MAYORS

- 1938 – 1941 Mayor Cenon Traballo
- 1941 – 1943 Mayor Ricardo Rojas

MUNICIPAL MAYORS (Japanese Era)

- 1943 – 1946 Mayor Basilio Soriao (Appointed)

MUNICIPAL MAYORS(Post-Independence)

- 1946 – 1948 Mayor Moises Tarrobal (by Succession)
- 1948 – 1952 Mayor Anacleto Tejada, LP
- 1952 – 1956 Mayor Anacleto Tejada (Re-elected) LP
- 1956 – 1960 Mayor Amando Vergara, NP
- 1960 – 1964 Mayor Amando Vergara, (Re-elected) NP
- 1964 – 1966 Mayor Gil Rojas, LP
- 1966 – 1968 Mayor Adriano Tresvalles (by Succession)
- 1968 – 1971 Mayor Rosaleo Regalado, NP
- 1971 – 1975 Mayor Floro Tresvalles, NP

MUNICIPAL MAYORS (Martial law era)

- 1975 – 1980 Mayor Floro Tresvalles, NP (Martial Law Extended)
- January 4 – March 2, 1980 – Pablo Molina (Officer-in-Charge),NP
- March 3, 1980 – April 30, 1986 – Mayor Andres Torres, KBL

MUNICIPAL MAYORS(Democracy restored)

- May 2, 1986 – August 20, 1986 – Acting Mayor Ely T. Mendoza, UNIDO
- August 21, 1986 – November 30, 1987 – Ely T. Mendoza (OIC Mayor)
- December 18, 1988 – February 2, 1988 – Dr. Loreto T. Rojas (OIC Mayor)

MUNICIPAL MAYORS(Contemporary Era)

- February 2, 1988 – June 30, 1992 – Mayor Felicito T. Tasarra
- June 30, 1992 – June 30, 1998 – Mayor Camilo R. Teope
- June 30, 1998 – June 30, 2004 – Mayor Lorenzo T. Templonuevo Jr.
- June 30, 2007- June 30, 2013 – Mayor Eulogio R. Rodriguez
- June 30, 2013 –June 30, 2016 – Mayor Juan T. Rodulfo
- June 30, 2016 –June 30, 2019 – Mayor Eulogio R. Rodriguez
- June 30, 2019 –Present – Mayor Juan T. Rodulfo

== Geography ==
Bato is located at the south-eastern portion of Catanduanes and is bounded on the north by the municipality of San Miguel; on the north-east by the municipality of Baras; on the east by the Philippine Sea; on the south by Cabugao Bay and on the west of Virac, the capital town of Catanduanes which is just 8 kilometres (5.0 mi) from Bato.

=== Geological feature ===
Stability and permeability of basic rock formation could be seen in the geologic map the existence of fault line along barangays Oguis, Sipi, Binanuahan, Cabugao and San Andres. These areas are considered critical especially in terms of development as urban expansion. Like other municipalities in the province of Catanduanes, Bato has many mineral deposits like gold, manganese, coal and copper.

=== Soil classification ===
The municipality of Bato is composed of five kinds of soils: hydrosol, mountain soil, alimodian clay loam, Louisiana clay, and San Miguel silt loam.

=== Slope ===
The elevation rises from sea level to about 700 metres (2,300 ft) above sea level. The flat lands are mostly found along the coast of Cabugao Bay along the banks of the Bato River. These flat lands with a slope of 0-3% occupies an average area of 25-30% of the entire area of Bato. The Poblacion which is located along the eastern side of the Bato River is among the barangays having this slope, characterized to be level to nearly level land. However, due to its location, the Poblacion together with the adjoining barangays frequently suffer floods. The eastern portion of Bato which faces the Pacific Ocean has a slope ranging between 3-30% slope. These areas shield the lowlands of the municipality from the incoming winds of the Pacific. These areas are mostly planted with orchards, hard wood trees and abaca.

=== Bato River ===
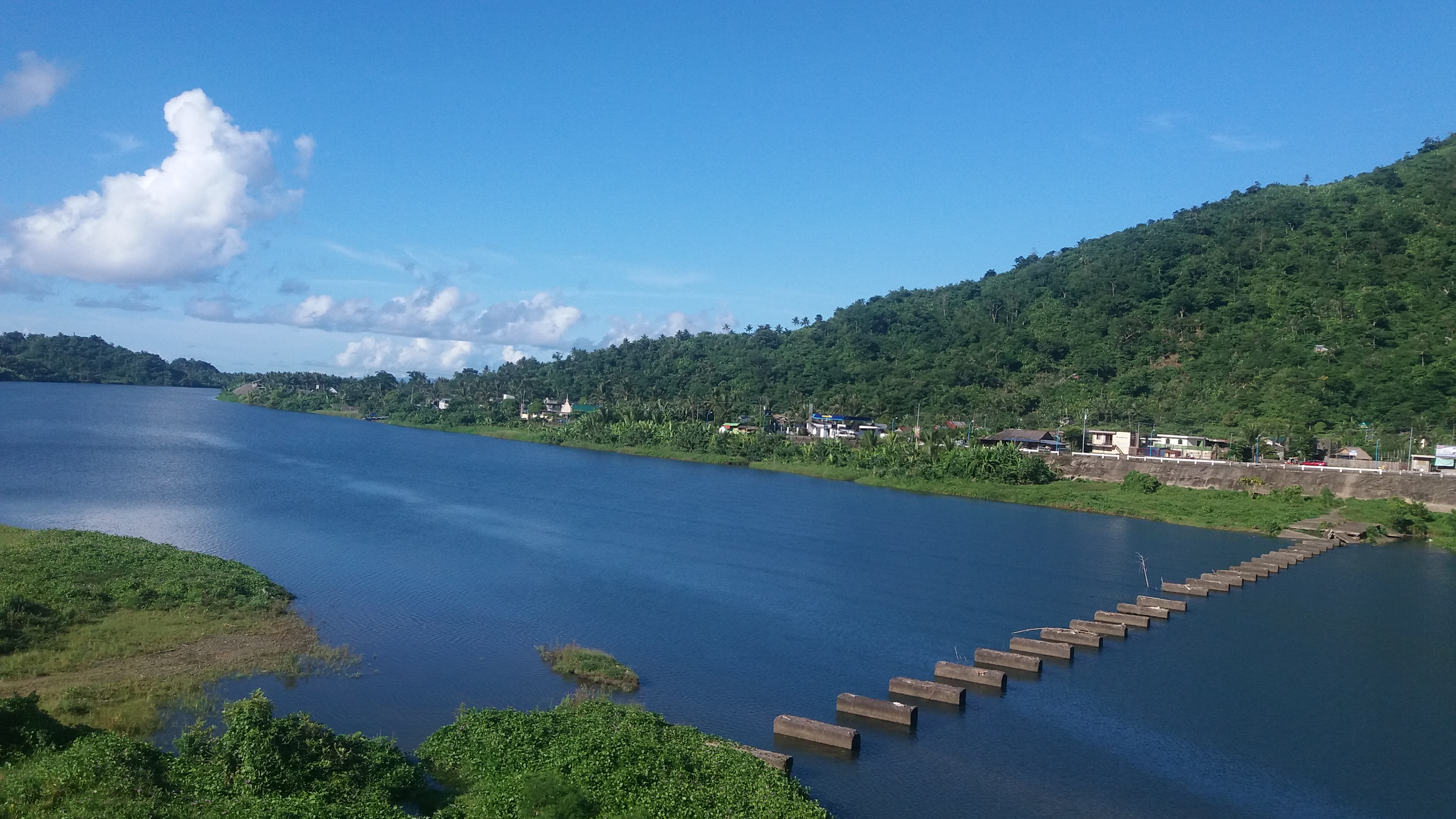
A view of Bato River

The Bato River stretches as far as Viga to Cabugao Bay. Once it was abundant in marine life but due to erosion and consistent flooding, the riverbed has been dumped with soil and this caused the river to get shallow and dry up. In the southern part of the Bato River is a delta, locally known as the Napo. Here farmers grow their agriculture such as peanuts, sweet potatoes, corn, beans, coconuts and palms. It is also the site for settling carabaos.

The river divides Bato into the east and west district. The Bato bridge, the longest in Bicol Region, spans the river from Barangay Tilis to Barangay Sipi. A modern bridge replaced the old bridge in Tilis which was damaged by Typhoon Angela in 1995.

=== Barangays ===
Bato is politically subdivided into 27 barangays. Each barangay consists of puroks and some have sitios.

- Aroyao Pequeño
- Bagumbayan
- Banawang (Poblacion)
- Batalay
- Binanuahan
- Bote
- Buenavista
- Cabugao
- Cagraray
- Carorian
- Guinobatan
- Ilawod (Poblacion)
- Libjo
- Libod (Poblacion)
- Marinawa
- Mintay
- Oguis
- Pananaogan
- San Andres
- San Pedro
- San Roque
- Santa Isabel
- Sibacungan
- Sipi
- Talisay
- Tamburan (Poblacion)
- Tilis

=== Climate ===
Climate data for Bato, Catanduanes
Month	Jan	Feb	Mar	Apr	May	Jun	Jul	Aug	Sep	Oct	Nov	Dec	Year
Mean daily maximum °C (°F)	27 (81)	27 (81)	28 (82)	30 (86)	31 (88)	30 (86)	29 (84)	29 (84)	29 (84)	29 (84)	28 (82)	27 (81)	29 (84)
Mean daily minimum °C (°F)	22 (72)	22 (72)	23 (73)	24 (75)	25 (77)	25 (77)	25 (77)	25 (77)	25 (77)	24 (75)	24 (75)	23 (73)	24 (75)
Average precipitation mm (inches)	138 (5.4)	83 (3.3)	74 (2.9)	50 (2.0)	108 (4.3)	165 (6.5)	202 (8.0)	165 (6.5)	190 (7.5)	186 (7.3)	188 (7.4)	183 (7.2)	1,732 (68.3)
Average rainy days	16.8	11.9	13.5	13.8	20.5	25.2	27.4	26.2	26.1	24.7	20.7	18.5	245.3
Source: Meteoblue

Like other towns in the pacific island, Bato is frequented by typhoons. This can happen up to 20 times per year, with some typhoons developing into really devastating calamities that can level entire towns. Flooding ensues in the Poblacion due to the river overflowing its banks.

Otherwise, the weather is a standard tropical weather, with the dry season settling in as early as January, and the wet season starting on June. Monsoon seasons pick up during the -ber months, in which the locals expect more typhoons to come.

== Demographics ==
Population census of Bato
Year	Pop.	±% p.a.
1903	8,438	—
1918	12,888	+2.86%
1939	17,230	+1.39%
1948	18,716	+0.92%
1960	13,339	−2.78%
1970	13,948	+0.45%
1975	15,415	+2.03%
1980	15,099	−0.41%
1990	15,331	+0.15%
1995	16,535	+1.43%
2000	17,761	+1.55%
2007	18,738	+0.74%
2010	19,984	+2.37%
2015	21,279	+1.20%
2020	21,748	+0.46%
2024	21,325	−0.47%
Source: Philippine Statistics Authority

In the 2024 census, the population of Bato was 21,325 people, with a density of 440 inhabitants per square kilometre or 1,100 inhabitants per square mile.

== Economy ==
Poverty incidence of Bato

Source: Philippine Statistics Authority

== Education ==
There are two schools district offices which govern all educational institutions within the municipality. They oversee the management and operations of all private and public, from primary to secondary schools. These are the:

- Bato East Schools District
- Bato West Schools District

=== Primary and elementary schools ===
- Bagumbayan Elementary School
- Batalay Elementary School
- Bato Central Elementary School
- Buenavista Elementary School
- Cagraray Elementary School
- Carorian Elementary School
- Guinobatan Elementary School
- Libjo Elementary School
- Marinawa Elementary School
- Marian Formation Center (Del Rosario)
- Marian Formation Center (St. Anthony)
- Mindchamps Learning Center
- Mintay Elementary School
- Oguis Elementary School
- Pananaogan Elementary School
- San Pedro Elementary School
- San Roque Elementary School
- Sibacungan Elementary School
- Sipi Elementary School

=== Secondary schools ===
- Bato Rural Development High School
- Bote Integrated School
- Cabugao Integrated School
