= Luisito Occiano =

Philippine bishop (born 1971)

His Excellency, The Most Reverend Luisito Occiano D.D.
- Bishop of Virac
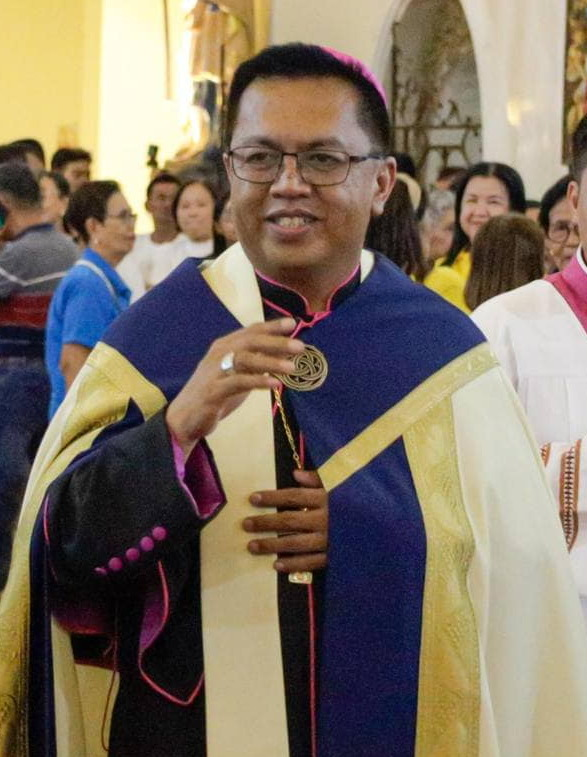
- Occiano in 2024
- Church: Roman Catholic Church
- Diocese: Virac
- Appointed: 29 February 2024
- Installed: 26 June 2024
- Predecessor: Manolo de los Santos

Orders
- Ordination: 10 November 1996
- Consecration: 21 June 2024 by Rolando Tria Tirona

Personal details
- Born: 21 June 1971 (age 55) Nabua, Camarines Sur, Philippines
- Education: Holy Rosary Minor Seminary; Ateneo de Manila University; Ateneo de Naga University (MA)
- Coat of arms

Luisito Audal Occiano (born 21 June 1971) is a Filipino Roman Catholic prelate who is currently the bishop of the Diocese of Virac. He studied philosophy and theology at the Holy Rosary Minor Seminary in Naga, Camarines Sur and was ordained a priest on 10 November 1996. He then attended Ateneo de Manila University, and received a Master of Arts from Ateneo de Naga University. Occiano was appointed the Bishop of Virac on 29 February 2024. He was consecrated bishop by Rolando Tria Tirona on 21 June 2024 and was installed as Bishop of Virac on 26 June.

Catholic Church titles
Preceded by Manolo de los Santos	Bishop of Virac; 26 June 2024 – present	Incumbent
