= Catanduanes's at-large congressional district =

Congressional district in the Philippines

- Constituency for the House of Representatives of the Philippines
- Map
- Location of Catanduanes within the Philippines
- Province: Catanduanes
- Region: Bicol Region
- Population: 261,169 (2024)
- Electorate: 200,804 (2025)
- Area: 1,492.16 km^{2} (576.13 sq mi)

Current constituency
- Created: 1945 (single-member district)
- Representative: Leo Rodriguez
- Political party: PFP
- Congressional bloc: Majority

Catanduanes's at-large congressional district, also known as Catanduanes's lone district, is the sole congressional district of the Philippines in the province of Catanduanes. Catanduanes has been represented in the country's various national legislatures since 1898. Since 1946 when it was reorganized as an independent province separate from Albay, Catanduanes has been entitled to one member in the House of Representatives of the Philippines, elected provincewide at-large, except for the period under the Fourth Philippine Republic between 1978 and 1984 when its representation was absorbed by the regional at-large assembly district of Region V.

The district is currently represented in the 20th Congress by Leo Rodriguez of the Partido Federal ng Pilipinas (PFP).

== Representation history ==
#	Term of office		National Assembly	Seat A				Seat B			
#	Start	End	National Assembly	Image	Member	Party	Electoral history	Image	Member	Party	Electoral history
=== Catanduanes's at-large district for the Malolos Congress ===
District created June 18, 1898.
–	September 15, 1898	March 23, 1901	1st		José Alejandrino	Independent	Appointed.		Marcelino Santos	Independent	Appointed.
#	Term of office		Congress	Single seat				Seats eliminated			
#	Start	End	Congress	Image	Member	Party	Electoral history	Seats eliminated			
=== Catanduanes's at-large district for the House of Representatives of the Philippines ===								Seats eliminated			
District re-created September 26, 1945.								Seats eliminated			
1	May 25, 1946	December 30, 1949	1st		Francisco Perfecto	Nacionalista	Redistricted from Albay's 4th district and re-elected in 1946.	Seats eliminated			
2	December 30, 1949	December 30, 1953	2nd		Severiano de León	Liberal	Elected in 1949.	Seats eliminated			
(1)	December 30, 1953	December 30, 1957	3rd		Francisco Perfecto	Nacionalista	Elected in 1953.	Seats eliminated			
3	December 30, 1957	September 23, 1972	4th		José M. Alberto	Liberal	Elected in 1957.	Seats eliminated			
3	December 30, 1957	September 23, 1972	5th		José M. Alberto	Liberal	Re-elected in 1961.	Seats eliminated			
3	December 30, 1957	September 23, 1972	6th		José M. Alberto	Nacionalista	Re-elected in 1965.	Seats eliminated			
3	December 30, 1957	September 23, 1972	7th		José M. Alberto	Nacionalista	Re-elected in 1969. Removed from office after imposition of martial law.	Seats eliminated			
District dissolved into the twelve-seat Region V's at-large district for the Interim Batasang Pambansa.								Seats eliminated			
#	Term of office		Batasang Pambansa	Single seat				Seats eliminated			
#	Start	End	Batasang Pambansa	Image	Member	Party	Electoral history	Seats eliminated			
=== Catanduanes's at-large district for the Regular Batasang Pambansa ===								Seats eliminated			
District re-created February 1, 1984.								Seats eliminated			
(3)	July 23, 1984	March 25, 1986	2nd		José M. Alberto	KBL	Elected in 1984.	Seats eliminated			
#	Term of office		Congress	Single seat				Seats eliminated			
#	Start	End	Congress	Image	Member	Party	Electoral history	Seats eliminated			
=== Catanduanes's at-large district for the House of Representatives of the Philippines ===								Seats eliminated			
District re-created February 2, 1987.								Seats eliminated			
4	June 30, 1987	November 15, 1987	8th		Moises M. Tapia	Independent	Elected in 1987. Died in office.	Seats eliminated			
5	June 30, 1992	June 30, 2001	9th		Leandro B. Verceles Jr.	Lakas	Elected in 1992.	Seats eliminated			
5	June 30, 1992	June 30, 2001	10th		Leandro B. Verceles Jr.	Lakas	Re-elected in 1995.	Seats eliminated			
5	June 30, 1992	June 30, 2001	11th		Leandro B. Verceles Jr.	Lakas	Re-elected in 1998.	Seats eliminated			
6	June 30, 2001	June 30, 2010	12th		Joseph Santiago	NPC	Elected in 2001.	Seats eliminated			
6	June 30, 2001	June 30, 2010	13th		Joseph Santiago	NPC	Re-elected in 2004.	Seats eliminated			
6	June 30, 2001	June 30, 2010	14th		Joseph Santiago	NPC	Re-elected in 2007.	Seats eliminated			
7	June 30, 2010	June 30, 2019	15th		Cesar Sarmiento	Liberal	Elected in 2010.	Seats eliminated			
7	June 30, 2010	June 30, 2019	16th		Cesar Sarmiento	Liberal	Re-elected in 2013.	Seats eliminated			
7	June 30, 2010	June 30, 2019	17th		Cesar Sarmiento	PDP–Laban	Re-elected in 2016.	Seats eliminated			
8	June 30, 2019	June 30, 2022	18th		Hector S. Sanchez	Lakas	Elected in 2019.	Seats eliminated			
9	June 30, 2022	Incumbent	19th		Eulogio Rodriguez	Independent	Elected in 2022.	Seats eliminated			
9	June 30, 2022	Incumbent	20th		Eulogio Rodriguez	PFP	Re-elected in 2025.	Seats eliminated			

== Election results ==
=== 2025 ===
Candidate	Party	Votes	%
Leo Rodriguez (incumbent)	Partido Federal ng Pilipinas	61,575	37.06
Sammy Laynes	Lakas–CMD	60,598	36.47
Jan Alberto	Independent	42,161	25.38
Cedric Sanchez	Independent	1,325	0.80
Eugenio Salimao Jr.	Independent	484	0.29
Total		166,143	100.00
Valid votes		166,143	95.54
Invalid/blank votes		7,754	4.46
Total votes		173,897	100.00
Registered voters/turnout		200,804	86.60
Partido Federal ng Pilipinas hold			
Source: Commission on Elections

=== 2022 ===
2022 Philippine House of Representatives elections
Party	Candidate	Votes	%
Independent	Leo Rodriguez	75,432	47.1
Lakas	Hector S. Sanchez (incumbent)	48,684	30.4
NUP	Cesar Sarmiento	33,281	20.78
Liberal	Oliver Rodulfo	2,754	1.72
Total votes		160,151	100.00
Independent gain from Lakas			

=== 2019 ===
2019 Philippine House of Representatives elections
Party	Candidate	Votes	%
Lakas	Hector S. Sanchez	56,743	
Nacionalista	Araceli Wong	44,407	
Independent	Jorge Sarmiento	40,970	
NPC	Joseph Santiago	5,630	
Total votes			100.00
Lakas gain from PDP–Laban			

=== 2016 ===
2016 Philippine House of Representatives elections in Catanduanes
Party	Candidate	Votes	%
Liberal	Cesar Sarmiento	86,430	66.31
UNA	Hector Sanchez	37,676	28.91
Independent	Jun Verceles	6,228	4.78
Total votes		130,334	100.00
Liberal hold			
